= Under the Influence Tour =

2023 concert tour by Chris Brown

- Tour by Chris Brown
- Promotional poster for the tour
- Location: United Kingdom, Europe, Ireland, Jamaica
- Associated album: Breezy
- Start date: February 11, 2023
- End date: August 27, 2023
- Legs: 1
- No. of shows: 28

Chris Brown concert chronology
- One of Them Ones Tour (2022); Under the Influence Tour (2023); The 11:11 Tour (2024)

The Under the Influence Tour was a concert tour by American singer Chris Brown to support his tenth studio album, Breezy (2022). The tour was named after his 2019 song "Under the Influence". Mainly staged to Europe, it began in Ireland on February 11, 2023 and ended in Jamaica on August 27, 2023, registering sold out during all the 28 dates scheduled.

It is reported the tour sold 377,412 tickets, and grossed $34,430,592, in its 27 European dates.

== Background ==
On November 26, 2022, Chris Brown announced an official headlining concert tour where he would perform throughout Europe, titled "Under the Influence Tour". The tour began on February 11, 2023, in Dublin, Ireland, at 3Arena, and ended on March 26, in Paris, France, at Accor Arena. Initially, the sole opening act for the tour was announced to be Jamaican rapper Skillibeng, but ended up being South African singer Tyla.

The revised name of the tour is taken from his 2022 single "Under the Influence", released from the expanded edition of his ninth studio album Indigo (2019). The tour marked Brown's first tour in Europe since the 2016 European leg of his One Hell of a Nite Tour. The tour also marked Brown's first concerts in the United Kingdom following the revoking of his ban from entering the country implemented in 2010. The tour was documented and uploaded to Brown's YouTube channel as a 4-part webisodes series.

The tour registered sold out during all the 19 arena dates scheduled, with 8 additional dates being later added, also registering sold out. The tour included six nights at London's O2 Arena, three nights at Accor Arena in Paris, three nights at Ziggo Dome in Amsterdam and more. On May 5, 2023, Brown released the music video for his song "Talm' Bout", shot in Europe while he was touring, featuring footage from the “Under the Influence Tour”.

Brown performed a one-off show of his "Under the Influence Tour" in Kingston, Jamaica at Jamaica National Stadium during Jamaica's "BZR Weekend" event on August 27, 2023. The show was billed as Chris Brown and Friends: Live In Jamaica. Brown shared the stage with Jamaican artists Sean Kingston, Teejay, Ding Dong, and more. This marked Brown's second time in Jamaica. His last appearance on the island was in 2010, when he performed with Elephant Man and Usher at Sumfest.

== Critical reception ==
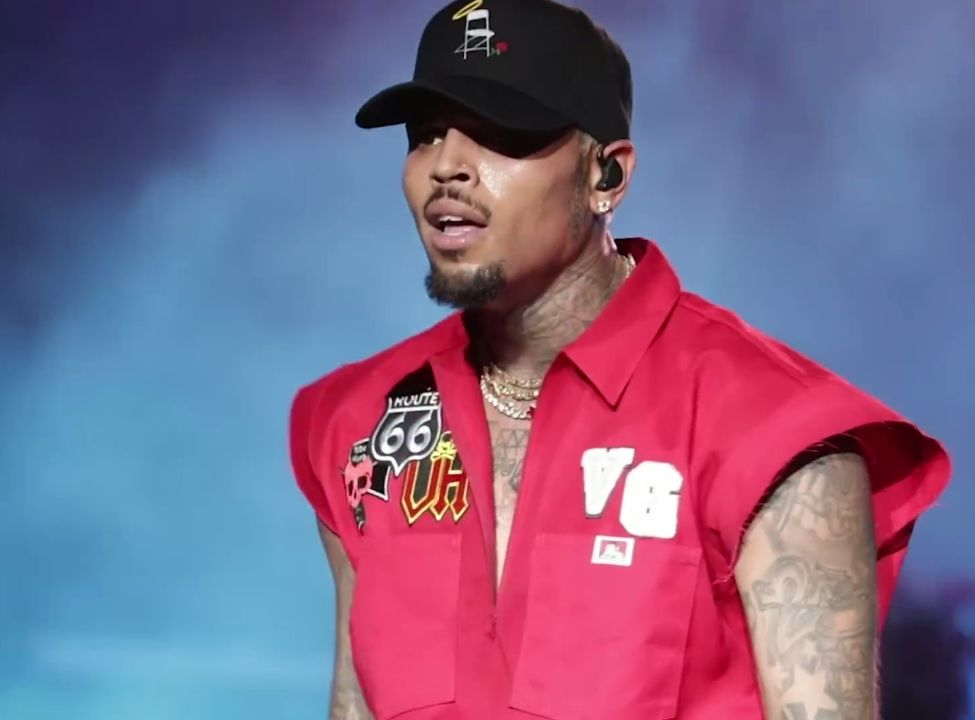
Chris Brown performing during the "Under the Influence Tour", at Jamaica National Stadium

Danielle Roper of Manchester Evening News reviewing the AO Arena concert of March 9, noted that "The crowd chant the lyrics - they really do seem to know every word to every song, no mean feat when we get nearly 50 of them, albeit only snippets of some", also stating that "Whatever you think of Chris Brown’s personal life, he's undeniably a great showman. His vocals, dancing and backing dancers are flawless and the show is perfectly paced." Leonie Projer of 20 Minuten commenting the Zürich concert noted large engagement from the audience. Oor reviewed the Amsterdam concert of March 6, stating that "What is immediately noticeable at the start of the show is that the production is leading. But: what a production! Colorful LED screens, animations, moving LED blocks, grand set pieces and, of course, lots of good dancers. Chris Brown is known as much for his dancing skills as he is for his music. He immediately rolls his body and is also not averse to breakdance moves. 33 years old, he still rocks them". Musikexpress stated that the highlight of the Berlin concert of March 1, was Brown's dancing. Donovan Watkis of World Music Views reviewed the Jamaica's National Stadium concert saying that through a "masterful performance" he proved "why he is a global superstar". Kediesha Perry of Jamaica Observer wrote favorably of the Kingston concert as well, stating that "The cinematic effects complemented the musical journey that supporters were taken on", complimenting the "high-energy choreography" and the amount of songs performed.

== Set list ==
This set list is representative of the show on February 20, 2023, in London. It does not represent all concerts for the duration of the tour. A small part of the setlist varied on every date, with the singer giving the crowd a choice of tracks to pick from on a board.

1. "Indigo"
2. "Beautiful People"
3. "Yeah 3x" (no verses)
4. "Party"
5. "Ayo"
6. "Undecided"
7. "Hope You Do"
8. "Liquor"
9. "Drunk Texting"
10. "No Bullshit"
11. "Come Together"
12. "Don't Judge Me"
13. "Run It!" (2 Verses and Chorus only)
14. "Gimme That" (Chorus only)
15. "Poppin'" (2 Verses and Chorus only)
16. "Wall to Wall" (Chorus only)
17. "With You" (1st Verse and Chorus only)
18. "Kiss Kiss" (Acapella Verse and Chorus only)
19. "Take You Down" (1st Verse and Chorus only with Fan onstage)
20. "Deuces" (1st Verse and Chorus only)
21. "She Ain't You" (1st Verse and Chorus only)
22. "Look at Me Now" (2 Verses and Chorus only)
23. "Don't Wake Me Up" (1st Verse and Chorus only)
24. "Turn Up the Music" (1st Verses and Chorus only)
25. "Pills & Automobiles"
26. "X"
27. "Kevin Hart Intermission Announcement" (Audio Interlude)
28. "Heat"
29. "C.A.B. (Catch a Body)"
30. "Pitch Black"
31. "Psychic"
32. "Passing Time"
33. "WE (Warm Embrace)"
34. "Back to Sleep"
35. "Lady in a Glass Dress (interlude)"
36. "Dream"
37. "Privacy"
38. "Under the Influence"
39. "Call Me Every Day"
40. "Monalisa (Chris' Verse and Chorus only)"
41. "Questions"
42. "Say Goodbye"
43. "Yo (Excuse Me Miss)"
44. "No Air"
45. "Forever"
46. "New Flame"
47. "Iffy"
48. "Loyal"
49. "No Guidance"
50. "Go Crazy"

== Dates ==
Date	City	Country	Venue
Europe
February 11, 2023	Dublin	Ireland	3Arena
February 12, 2023	Dublin	Ireland	3Arena
February 14, 2023	London	England	The O_{2} Arena
February 15, 2023	London	England	The O_{2} Arena
February 16, 2023	London	England	The O_{2} Arena
February 19, 2023	Birmingham	England	Resorts World Arena
February 20, 2023	London	England	The O_{2} Arena
February 23, 2023	Paris	France	Accor Arena
February 24, 2023	Paris	France	Accor Arena
February 26, 2023	Zürich	Switzerland	Hallenstadion
February 28, 2023	Oberhausen	Germany	Rudolf Weber-Arena
March 1, 2023	Berlin	Germany	Mercedes-Benz Arena
March 3, 2023	Brussels	Belgium	Palais 12
March 4, 2023	Munich	Germany	Olympiahalle
March 6, 2023	Amsterdam	Netherlands	Ziggo Dome
March 7, 2023	Amsterdam	Netherlands	Ziggo Dome
March 9, 2023	Manchester	England	AO Arena
March 12, 2023	Manchester	England	AO Arena
March 13, 2023	Manchester	England	AO Arena
March 15, 2023	Dublin	Ireland	3Arena
March 17, 2023	Glasgow	Scotland	OVO Hydro
March 19, 2023	London	England	The O_{2} Arena
March 20, 2023	London	England	The O_{2} Arena
March 21, 2023	Birmingham	England	Resorts World Arena
March 23, 2023	Amsterdam	Netherlands	Ziggo Dome
March 25, 2023	Frankfurt	Germany	Festhalle
March 26, 2023	Paris	France	Accor Arena
Caribbean
August 27, 2023	Kingston	Jamaica	Jamaica National Stadium
