= BET Awards 2023 =

2023 American television program

2023 BET Awards
- Date: June 25, 2023
- Location: Microsoft Theater, Los Angeles, California
- Presented by: Black Entertainment Television

Highlights
- Most awards: Beyoncé and SZA (3 each)
- Most nominations: Drake (7)
- Website: www.bet.com/shows/bet-awards.html

Television/radio coverage
- Network: BET
- Directed by: Glenn Weiss

The 23rd BET Awards took place on June 25, 2023, to celebrate achievements in entertainment and honors music, sports, television, and movies. It was held at the Microsoft Theater in Los Angeles, California, and had no host due to the WGA Strike.

The nominations were announced on June 8. Canadian rapper Drake received the most nominations with seven, followed by GloRilla with six, 21 Savage and Lizzo with five each, and Beyoncé, Burna Boy, Chris Brown, Ice Spice, and SZA, all with four. The Viewer's Choice Award category also returned after not being presented the year prior. The performers were announced on June 15. On June 23, it was announced that rapper Busta Rhymes would receive of the Lifetime Achievement Award, and Patti LaBelle performed a tribute to Tina Turner. The show received mixed reviews; with some praising the performances but criticizing the choice of winners.

== Performers ==
The list of performers was announced on June 15, 2023.

Artist(s)	Song(s)
Main show
Lil Uzi Vert	"Spin Again" "Just Wanna Rock"
The Sugarhill Gang; MC Lyte; D-Nice; Big Daddy Kane	"Rapper's Delight" "Cha Cha Cha" "Call Me D-Nice" "Raw"
Latto	"Put It on da Floor"
Warren G Yo-Yo; Tyga; E-40	"Regulate" "You Can't Play With My Yo-Yo" "Rack City" "Tell Me When To Go"
Coco Jones	"ICU"
Davido	"Feel" "Unavailable"
Quavo; Offset	"Hotel Lobby (Unc & Phew)" "Bad and Boujee"
Trick Daddy; Trina; Uncle Luke	"Nann Nigga" "I Wanna Rock (Doo Doo Brown)"
Chief Keef; Ying Yang Twins	"Faneto" "Wait (The Whisper Song)"
Doechii; Trillville	"Booty Drop" "What It Is (Block Boy)" "Some Cut"
Jeezy; T.I. Master P	"Dey Know" "24's" "Make 'Em Say Uhh!"
Erick Sermon; Keith Murray; Redman	"Music" "The Most Beautifullest Thing in This World"
Doug E. Fresh; Mad Lion; Patra; Vicious	"Take It Easy"
GloRilla	"Lick or Sum"
Mad Skillz	Hip Hop 50 Spoken Word Tribute
Patti LaBelle	Tribute to Tina Turner "The Best"
Fat Joe; Remy Ma; Fabolous; Styles P Ja Rule	"All the Way Up" "Breathe" "Good Times" "Put It On Me"
Ice Spice	"Munch (Feelin' U)" "Princess Diana" "In Ha Mood"
Busta Rhymes; Remy Ma; Coi Leray; BIA; Cutty Ranks; Dexta Daps; M.O.P. Rah Digga; ScarLip; Spice; Super Cat; Swizz Beatz	Medley "Ante Up" "Break Ya Neck" "This is New York" "Touch It" "Put Your Hands Where My Eyes Could See" "Players" "Beach Ball" "Pass the Courvoisier, Part II" "So Mi Like It"
69 Boyz; DJ Unk; Fast Life Yungstaz; Kid 'n Play; Soulja Boy	"Tootsee Roll" "Crank That (Soulja Boy)" "Swag Surfin"
BET Amplified Stage
Lola Brooke	"Don't Play with It"
Kali	"Area Codes"

== Winners and nominees ==
Below is the list of winners and nominees. Winners are listed first and highlighted in bold.

Album of the Year	Video of the Year
**Renaissance – Beyoncé (TIE)**; **SOS – SZA (TIE)**; Anyways, Life's Great – GloRilla; Breezy – Chris Brown; God Did – DJ Khaled; Her Loss – Drake & 21 Savage; Mr. Morale & the Big Steppers – Kendrick Lamar	**"Kill Bill" – SZA**; "WE (Warm Embrace)" – Chris Brown; "2 Million Up" – " Peezy, Jeezy & Real Boston Richey featuring Rob49; "About Damn Time" – Lizzo; "Bad Habit" – Steve Lacy; "First Class" – Jack Harlow; "Tomorrow 2" – GloRilla & Cardi B
Viewer's Choice Award	Best Collaboration
**"Break My Soul" – Beyoncé**; "About Damn Time" – Lizzo; "First Class" – Jack Harlow; "Jimmy Cooks" – Drake featuring 21 Savage; "Kill Bill" – SZA; "Last Last" – Burna Boy; "Super Freaky Girl" – Nicki Minaj; "Wait for U" – Future featuring Drake & Tems	**"Wait for U" – Future featuring Drake & Tems**; "F.N.F. (Let's Go)" – GloRilla & Hitkidd; "Big Energy (Remix)" – Latto & Mariah Carey featuring DJ Khaled; "Call Me Every Day" – Chris Brown featuring Wizkid; "Boy's a Liar Pt. 2" – PinkPantheress & Ice Spice; "Can't Stop Won't Stop" – King Combs featuring Kodak Black; "Creepin'" – Metro Boomin, The Weeknd & 21 Savage; "Tomorrow 2" – GloRilla & Cardi B
Best Male R&B/Pop Artist	Best Female R&B/Pop Artist
**Usher (TIE)**; **Chris Brown (TIE)**; Blxst; Brent Faiyaz; Burna Boy; Drake; The Weeknd	**SZA**; Ari Lennox; Beyoncé; Coco Jones; H.E.R.; Lizzo; Tems
Best Female Hip Hop Artist	Best Male Hip Hop Artist
**Latto**; GloRilla; Cardi B; Coi Leray; Ice Spice; Megan Thee Stallion; Nicki Minaj	**Kendrick Lamar**; 21 Savage; Drake; Future; J. Cole; Jack Harlow; Lil Baby
Best New Artist	Best Group
**Coco Jones**; GloRilla; Ambré; Doechii; FLO; Ice Spice; Lola Brooke	**Drake & 21 Savage**; City Girls; Dvsn; FLO; Maverick City Music & Kirk Franklin; Quavo & Takeoff; Wanmor
BET Her Award	Dr. Bobby Jones Best Gospel/Inspirational Award
**"Break My Soul" – Beyoncé**; "About Damn Time" – Lizzo; "Boy's a Liar Pt. 2" – PinkPantheress & Ice Spice; "Her" – Megan Thee Stallion; "Lift Me Up" – Rihanna & Ludwig Göransson; "Players" – Coi Leray; "Special" – Lizzo	**"Bless Me" – Maverick City Music & Kirk Franklin**; "Finished (Live)" – Tamela Mann; "I've Got Joy" – CeCe Winans; "Kingdom" – Maverick City Music & Kirk Franklin featuring Naomi Raine & Chandler Moore; "New" – Tye Tribbett; "One Moment from Glory" – Yolanda Adams; "The Better Benediction (Pt.2)" – PJ Morton featuring Lisa Knowles-Smith, Le'Andria Johnson, Keke Wyatt, Kierra Sheard & Tasha Cobbs Leonard
Video Director of the Year	Best Movie
**Teyana "Spike Tey" Taylor**; A$AP Rocky for AWGE; Benny Boom; Burna Boy; Cole Bennett; Dave Free x Kendrick Lamar; Director X	**Black Panther: Wakanda Forever**; Creed 3; Emancipation; Nope; The Woman King; Till; Whitney Houston: I Wanna Dance with Somebody
Best Actor	Best Actress
**Damson Idris**; Amin Joseph; Brian Tyree Henry; Daniel Kaluuya; Demetrius Flenory Jr.; Donald Glover; Michael B. Jordan	**Angela Bassett**; Coco Jones; Janelle James; Janelle Monáe; Keke Palmer; Viola Davis; Zendaya
Sportswoman of the Year	Sportsman of the Year
**Angel Reese**; Alexis Morris; Allyson Felix; Candace Parker; Naomi Osaka; Serena Williams; Sha'Carri Richardson	**Jalen Hurts**; Aaron Judge; Bubba Wallace; Gervonta Davis; LeBron James; Patrick Mahomes; Stephen Curry
Best International Act	Best New International Act
**Burna Boy** (Nigeria); Ayra Starr (Nigeria); Aya Nakamura (France); Central Cee (UK); Ella Mai (UK); K.O. (South Africa); L7nnon (Brazil); Stormzy (UK); Tiakola (France); Uncle Waffles (Swaziland)	**Libianca** (Cameroon); Asake (Nigeria); Camidoh (Ghana); FLO (UK); Maureen (France); MC Ryan SP (Brazil); Pabi Cooper (South Africa); Raye (UK); Werenoi (France)
Lifetime Achievement Award	YoungStars Award
**Busta Rhymes**	**Marsai Martin**; Akira Akbar; Alaya High; Demi Singleton; Genesis Denise; Thaddeus J. Mixson; Young Dylan

== In Memoriam ==
- Franco Harris
- Jesse Powers
- David A. Arnold
- Bernard Shaw
- Lamont Dozier
- Roger E. Mosley
- Bill Russell
- Koko Da Doll
- Otis Redding III
- Willis Reed
- Bobby Caldwell
- Ahmad Jamal
- Brandon Smiley
- Gordy Harmon
- Fred White
- Wayne Shorter
- Clay Evans Jr.
- Big Pokey
- Lance Reddick
- Gangsta Boo
- Harry Belafonte
- Tina Turner
