= Back to Love (Chris Brown song) =

2019 song by Chris Brown

Single by Chris Brown

from the album Indigo
- Released: April 11, 2019
- Genre: R&B
- Length: 3:42
- Label: RCA
- Songwriters: Christopher Brown; Cam Wallace; Nathan Pérez; Atia Boggs; Keith Thomas; Mark Pitts
- Producer: Cam Wallace

Chris Brown singles chronology
"Chi Chi" (2019)	"Back to Love" (2019)	"Wobble Up" (2019)

Music video
- "Back to Love" on YouTube

"Back to Love" is a song by American singer Chris Brown. It was released by RCA Records on April 11, 2019, serving as the second single from his ninth studio album Indigo.

The song received positive reviews from music critics who celebrated its lyrical content and production, praising the intention from Brown to bring himself close to his early R&B roots, comparing it to some works from his Grammy Award winning album F.A.M.E., and to Michael Jackson's music from the 1990s as well. Despite the favorable critical reception, the single became the lowest-charting release from Indigo.

== Background ==
Chris Brown teased the song with a post on his Instagram account, while he was performing a choreography for it.

== Composition and lyrics ==
The song was written by Chris Brown and Mark Pitts, and was produced by Cam Wallace. "Back to Love" runs for three minutes and forty two seconds. The instrumentation is dominated by percussive elements and a slapping snare. The song is also bass-heavy while featuring extended guitar chords, riffs, and a woodwind synth that makes an appearance halfway through the track.

The song is about a man that wants to leave his past behind him, apologizing to his girlfriend, for mistreating her, needing to get back to love in the correct way, thanking her for helping him to open his eyes, promising to be a better man.

== Critical reception ==
Andy Kellman of AllMusic defined the song as a "career highlight". Alex Zidel of HotNewHipHop said that the song is "lyrically deep and conscious, while musically has a worldwide and timeless sound", noticing that with "Back to Love", and his previous single "Undecided", Brown is successfully trying to bring himself close to his early R&B roots. Ken Hamm of SoulBounce described the song as "meaningful", saying that the song is a revival of Michael Jackson's music from the 1990s.

== Music video ==
The music video was directed by Brown, and released the same day as the song. The video was shot in Paris, and starts with Brown escaping some paparazzi. The singer is driven to the edge of the Seine, where he shows off various dance moves in front of what appears to be an illuminated well. Groups of dancing children from across the globe make cameos throughout the music video as Chris Brown continues to display his dancing ability in the midst of rows of columns which later morph into striped moving pillars. The visual style and choreography of "Back to Love" drew comparisons to Michael Jackson’s music videos, highlighting him as a clear source of inspiration.

== Credits and personnel ==
Credits adapted from Tidal.

- Chris Brown - vocals, lyrics, composer
- Cameron Wallace - producer, composer
- Mark Pitts - lyrics, composer
- Nathan Perez - composer
- Atia Boggs - composer
- Keith Thomas - composer
- Ben Chang - assistant engineer
- Randy Merril - mastering engineer
- Patrizio Pigliapoco - mixing engineer, recording engineer

== Charts ==
Chart performance for "Back to Love"
Chart (2019)	Peak position
New Zealand (NZ Hot Singles Chart)	12
UK Singles (Official Charts)	82
UK Hip Hop/R&B (Official Charts)	6
US Hot R&B Songs (Billboard)	16

== Release history ==
Region	Date	Format	Label	Ref.
Various	April 14, 2019	Digital download; streaming	RCA	
