= Under the Influence (Chris Brown song) =

2019 single by Chris Brown

- 2022 single cover

Single by Chris Brown

from the album Indigo (Extended)
- Released: September 6, 2022
- Recorded: 2019
- Genre: R&B
- Length: 3:04
- Label: RCA; CBE
- Lyricists: Chris Brown; David Adedeji Adeleke; Tiffany Mckie
- Producer: KDDO

Chris Brown singles chronology
"Call Me Every Day" (2022)	"Under the Influence" (2022)	"Nasty" (2022)

Music video
- "Under the Influence" on YouTube

"Under the Influence" is a song by American singer-songwriter Chris Brown. It is the third track on the extended edition of his ninth studio album Indigo, which was released on October 4, 2019, by RCA Records. The song was composed by Brown along with Nigerian singer Davido, producer Kiddominant and Tiffany Mckie. "Under the Influence" became a sleeper hit in 2022, becoming viral on the TikTok platform. Afterwards, it was officially released as a single, roughly three years following its original release.

"Under the Influence" received great success internationally, reaching the top ten in more than twenty countries between 2022 and 2023, including United Kingdom, Australia, India, New Zealand and South Africa, while peaking at number 12 on the US Billboard Hot 100. Among the certifications it gained, it was most notably certified diamond by the National Syndicate of Phonographic Publishing (SNEP), quintuple platinum by the Recording Industry Association of America (RIAA), quadruple platinum by the Australian Recording Industry Association (ARIA), triple platinum by the Canadian Recording Industry Association (MC), and double platinum by the British Phonographic Industry (BPI). The song's title became the name of Brown's 2023 European tour.

== Development and composition ==
"Under the Influence" is an R&B song, written by Chris Brown, Nigerian singer Davido and Tiffany Mckie, while its production was handled by Nigerian producer KDDO. The song was included on the expanded edition of Brown's ninth studio album Indigo (2019). The song marks the third collaboration between Brown and Davido, following Davido's 2019 single "Blow My Mind", and their duet "Lower Body", also contained on the expanded version of Indigo. Lyrically, in the song Brown expresses his desires while having a passionate sexual encounter, being under the influence of codeine. According to Billboard, Brown on the record "turns the tempo down several notches". Marc Griffin of Vibe magazine, said that the song's lyrics "are coated in temptation, delivering his [second] verse lustfully, rattling off things he would like to do with (and to) his lover".

== Critical reception ==
Billboard listed "Under the Influence" among "The 10 Best R&B Songs of 2022".

== Music video ==
The music video for "Under the Influence" was directed by visual artist Child, and released on October 20, 2022. The clip was recorded in an abandoned warehouse, and features Brown surrounded by female dancers, that perform sexually suggestive moves around him. Vibe, said that the music video shows the singer "deep in contemplation, sorting through his need for her, while other shots feature a gaggle of dancers with glowing eyes seductively enticing Brown with desire". HotNewHipHop noted that in the "sensual" video, Brown "kept his choreography to a minimum", despite his music videos usually featuring complex choreographies performed by the singer himself.

== Commercial performance ==
Despite not being initially released as a single, "Under the Influence" became a viral sleeper hit in 2022 via TikTok. During the summer of 2022, the song entered the charts in many countries for the first time, reaching the top ten in Australia, Luxembourg, Greece, Malaysia, New Zealand, South Africa, Philippines, Singapore, Slovakia, Switzerland, and the United Kingdom. It debuted at number 36 on the US Billboard Hot 100 on the September 24, 2022 week, three years following its release. With "Under the Influence", Brown became the first R&B singer in history to have over fifty top-40 hits on the Billboard Hot 100. The song peaked at number 3 on the Billboard Global 200, making it Brown's first top ten on the Global 200 chart since the chart was introduced in 2020. The song topped the R&B/Hip-Hop Airplay chart, making it Brown's tenth number-one song on the chart. "Under the Influence" first reached No. 1 on Apple Music's Top 100: Global chart in mid-September 2022.

On May 17, 2023, "Under the Influence" became Brown's second longest-charting song, without a feature, at 35 weeks. The song surpassed the 33 week tenancy of 2008's "Forever". The song is also Brown's longest charting single since his 2005 debut single "Run It!" (which ran on the Hot 100 for 38 weeks). "Under the Influence" was the tenth most-heard song on U.S. radio in the first half of 2023, with a cumulative 1.142 billion audience impressions across all formats monitored by Luminate. “Under The Influence” is Brown's first song to ever reach one billion streams on Spotify.

== Tour ==
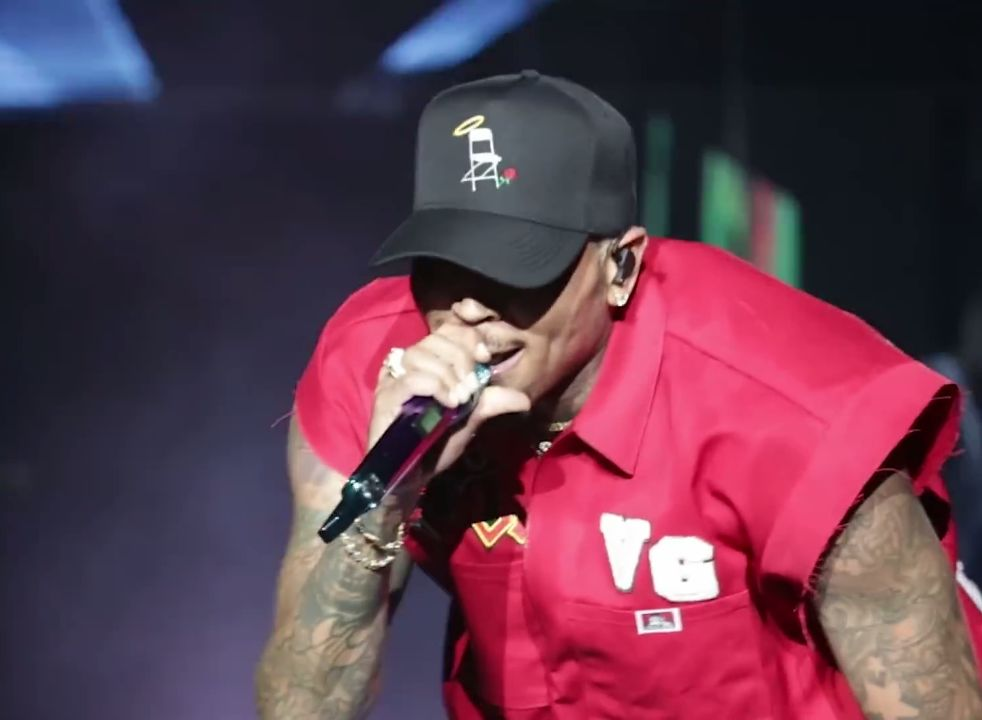
Chris Brown performing during the Under the Influence Tour, at Jamaica National Stadium

Following the global success of the song, Brown named a concert tour after it. The "Under the Influence Tour" was a tour to support Brown's tenth studio album, Breezy (2022). The opening act for the tour was South African singer Tyla. It began in Ireland on February 11, 2023, and ended in Jamaica on August 27, 2023. The tour included shows in United Kingdom, Europe, Ireland and Jamaica, registering sold out during all the 28 dates scheduled.

== Charts ==
=== Weekly charts ===
Weekly chart performance for "Under the Influence"
Chart (2022–2023)	Peak position
Australia (ARIA)	5
Austria (Ö3 Austria Top 40)	16
Belgium (Ultratop 50 Wallonia)	48
Canada Hot 100 (Billboard)	13
Czech Republic Singles Digital (ČNS IFPI)	16
Denmark (Tracklisten)	17
France (SNEP)	20
Germany (GfK)	12
Global 200 (Billboard)	3
Greece International (IFPI)	2
Hungary (Single Top 40)	8
Hungary (Stream Top 40)	19
Iceland (Tónlistinn)	24
India International Singles (IMI)	1
Ireland (IRMA)	14
Italy (FIMI)	66
Lebanon (OLT20)	10
Lithuania (AGATA)	21
Luxembourg (Billboard)	7
Malaysia International (RIM)	2
MENA (IFPI)	12
Netherlands (Single Top 100)	24
New Zealand (Recorded Music NZ)	2
Nigeria (TurnTable Top 100)	25
Norway (VG-lista)	31
Philippines (Billboard)	3
Poland Airplay (ZPAV)	45
Portugal (AFP)	5
Romania (Billboard)	19
Romania TV Airplay (Media Forest)	3
Singapore (RIAS)	7
Slovakia (Singles Digitál Top 100)	6
South Africa Streaming (TOSAC)	2
Suriname (Nationale Top 40)	14
Sweden (Sverigetopplistan)	29
Switzerland (Schweizer Hitparade)	4
UAE (IFPI)	19
UK Singles (Official Charts)	7
UK Hip Hop/R&B (Official Charts)	2
US Billboard Hot 100	12
US Adult R&B Songs (Billboard)	19
US Adult Pop Airplay (Billboard)	38
US Dance Airplay (Billboard)	29
US Hot R&B/Hip-Hop Songs (Billboard)	3
US Pop Airplay (Billboard)	10
US R&B/Hip-Hop Airplay (Billboard)	1
US Rhythmic Airplay (Billboard)	1
Vietnam (Vietnam Hot 100)	52

=== Year-end charts ===
2022 year-end chart performance for "Under the Influence"
Chart (2022)	Position
Australia (ARIA)	52
Belgium (Ultratop Wallonia)	196
Canada (Canadian Hot 100)	89
Denmark (Tracklisten)	82
France (SNEP)	149
Germany (Official German Charts)	63
Global 200 (Billboard)	95
Hungary (Single Top 40)	93
Hungary (Stream Top 40)	55
Lithuania (AGATA)	95
Netherlands (Single Top 100)	84
New Zealand (Recorded Music NZ)	19
Switzerland (Schweizer Hitparade)	41
UK Singles (OCC)	45
US Hot R&B/Hip-Hop Songs (Billboard)	46
US Streaming Songs (Billboard)	67

2023 year-end chart performance for "Under the Influence"
Chart (2023)	Position
Australia (ARIA)	83
Global 200 (Billboard)	24
New Zealand (Recorded Music NZ)	32
Switzerland (Schweizer Hitparade)	92
UK Singles (OCC)	69
US Billboard Hot 100	17
US Hot R&B/Hip-Hop Songs (Billboard)	9
US Mainstream Top 40 (Billboard)	34
US Rhythmic (Billboard)	6

== Certifications ==
Certifications for "Under the Influence"
Region	Certification	Certified units/sales
Australia (ARIA)	4× Platinum	280,000^{‡}
Austria (IFPI Austria)	Gold	15,000^{‡}
Canada (Music Canada)	3× Platinum	240,000^{‡}
Denmark (IFPI Danmark)	Platinum	90,000^{‡}
France (SNEP)	Diamond	333,333^{‡}
Germany (BVMI)	Gold	200,000^{‡}
Hungary (MAHASZ)	4× Platinum	16,000^{‡}
Italy (FIMI)	Platinum	100,000^{‡}
New Zealand (RMNZ)	5× Platinum	150,000^{‡}
Nigeria (TCSN)	Gold	50,000^{‡}
Poland (ZPAV)	2× Platinum	100,000^{‡}
Portugal (AFP)	3× Platinum	30,000^{‡}
Spain (Promusicae)	Gold	30,000^{‡}
Switzerland (IFPI Switzerland)	2× Platinum	40,000^{‡}
United Kingdom (BPI)	2× Platinum	1,200,000^{‡}
United States (RIAA)	5× Platinum	5,000,000^{‡}
Streaming
Greece (IFPI Greece)	3× Platinum	6,000,000^{†}
Sweden (GLF)	Platinum	8,000,000^{†}
^{‡} Sales+streaming figures based on certification alone.^{†} Streaming-only figures based on certification alone.

== Release history ==
Release dates and formats for "Under the Influence"
Region	Date	Format(s)	Label	Ref.
Various	September 6, 2022	Digital download; streaming	CBE; RCA	
United States	September 20, 2022	Rhythmic contemporary radio	RCA	
United States	October 18, 2022	Hot adult contemporary radio	RCA	
United States	October 18, 2022	Contemporary hit radio	RCA	
United States	January 10, 2023	Urban contemporary radio	RCA	
