= Nasty (Tyga and Chris Brown song) =

2022 single by Tyga and Chris Brown

Single by Tyga and Chris Brown
- Released: December 16, 2022
- Genre: R&B; West Coast hip-hop
- Length: 3:28; 3:32 (clean version)
- Label: Last Kings; Empire
- Songwriters: Micheal Stevenson; Christopher Brown; Huakeem Green; Ebby Marango; Alexander Edwards
- Producers: Murphy Kid; ManMan

Tyga singles chronology
"Booty Dancer" (2022)	"Nasty" (2022)	"Let's Get Busy" (2023)

Chris Brown singles chronology
"Under the Influence" (2022)	"Nasty" (2022)	"Do You Mind" (2023)

Music video
- "Nasty" on YouTube

"Nasty" is a single by American rapper Tyga and American singer Chris Brown, released on December 16, 2022, with an accompanying music video. It was produced by Murphy Kid and ManMan.

== Composition ==
The song has been described as "club-ready" and combines elements of West Coast hip hop into R&B, with Tyga performing in a melodic style similar to that of Chris Brown.

== Music video ==
The music video, described as "futuristic", contains shots of women and "provocative outfits”, was released on December 15, 2022.

== Charts ==
Chart performance for "Nasty"
Chart (2023)	Peak position
New Zealand Hot Singles (RMNZ)	6
US R&B/Hip-Hop Airplay (Billboard)	24
US Rhythmic Airplay (Billboard)	11
