= Chi Chi (Trey Songz song) =

Single by Trey Songz featuring Chris Brown
- Released: February 4, 2019
- Recorded: January 2019
- Length: 2:19
- Label: Songbook; Atlantic
- Songwriters: Tremaine Neverson; Chris Brown
- Producers: Smash David; CuBeatz

Trey Songz singles chronology
"Shootin' Shots" (2018)	"Chi Chi" (2019)	"Big Rich Town (Remix)" (2019)

Chris Brown singles chronology
"Undecided" (2019)	"Chi Chi" (2019)	"Back to Love" (2019)

"Chi Chi" is a song by American R&B singers Trey Songz and Chris Brown, released as a standalone single on February 4, 2019.

== Track listing ==
Digital download
No.	Title	Length
1.	"Chi Chi" (featuring Chris Brown)	2:19

Digital download – radio edit
No.	Title	Length
1.	"Chi Chi [Hikeii Remix]" (featuring Chris Brown)	2:57

== Charts ==
Chart performance for "Chi Chi"
Chart (2019)	Peak position
New Zealand Hot Singles (RMNZ)	9
US Hot R&B Songs (Billboard)	17
US R&B/Hip-Hop Airplay (Billboard)	32

== Certifications ==
Certifications for "Chi Chi"
Region	Certification	Certified units/sales
New Zealand (RMNZ)	Gold	15,000^{‡}
^{‡} Sales+streaming figures based on certification alone.
