= No Statements =

2023 single by ScarLip

Single by ScarLip
- Released: September 15, 2023
- Length: 2:38
- Label: Broken Child; Epic
- Songwriters: Sierra Lucas; Bilall Ukshini; Ermal Ademi; Osman Osmani
- Producer: Pluto Spazzin

ScarLip singles chronology
"This Is New York" (2023)	"No Statements" (2023)	"Blick" (2023)

Music video
- "No Statements" on YouTube

"No Statements" is a song by American rapper ScarLip, released on September 15, 2023, alongside a music video. Produced by Pluto Spazzin, it is her first song to chart, debuting at number 40 and peaking at number 23 on the Billboard Mainstream R&B/Hip-Hop Airplay chart.

== Content ==
In the song, ScarLip condemns the practice of "snitching". Performing in her usual aggressive style, she claims "I'm from place where we don't do no rattin'". ScarLip emphasizes that she and her crew will not participate in such activity and warns others not to do so either. At one point, she also reflects on being "signed for four million".

== Music video ==
The music video was directed by Sarah McColgan. It finds ScarLip and her crew in a mob and taking over a prison bus. The clip features a cameo from Swizz Beatz.

== Charts ==
Chart performance for "No Statements"
Chart (2023–2024)	Peak position
US Mainstream R&B/Hip-Hop Airplay (Billboard)	23
