= Breezy (album) =

- Standard cover. Deluxe cover features negative colors of the standard one.

Studio album by Chris Brown
- Released: June 24, 2022
- Recorded: 2019–2022
- Genres: R&B; soul; trap
- Length: 80:10
- Labels: CBE; RCA
- Producers: 3ddy; Joel Anguita; The Audibles; Roark Bailey; Blaisebeatz; The Breed; Shaun Carrington; Nick Cassidy; Chizzy; Coop the Truth; Dejuan Cross; DannyProdThis; Deafh Beats; Don City; DonnyBravo; Dre Moon; Emack; Dylan Graham; Benjamin Harry; KanielTheOne; Keyz; Kifa; Albrecht Lange; Musik MajorX; Nami; Mohammed Nasrollahnejad; Nellz; Pearl Lion; Queen Sixties; Relyt; Nate Rhoads; RoccStar; RockBoy; Gabriel Roland; Frank Rose; Travis Sayles; Sefru; Seoul; Smash David; SprngBrk; Teezio; Upstrz; Riley Urick; Nile Waves; Orlando Williamson; XZ; Ye Ali; Jovan J Dawkins; Yng Josh; Yonni

Chris Brown chronology
Slime & B (2020)	Breezy (2022)	11:11 (2023)

Singles from Breezy
- 1. "Iffy" Released: January 14, 2022; 2. "WE (Warm Embrace)" Released: April 1, 2022; 3. "Call Me Every Day" Released: June 17, 2022

Breezy is the tenth studio album by the American singer Chris Brown, released on June 24, 2022, as the follow-up to his 2019 album Indigo. The artists featured on the album are Lil Wayne, Anderson .Paak, Blxst, Lil Baby, H.E.R., EST Gee, Wizkid, Jack Harlow, Tory Lanez, Fivio Foreign, Ella Mai, Yung Bleu, Capella Grey, Lil Durk, Davido, and Bryson Tiller.

An R&B album blended with trap music and soul, Breezy predominantly explores romantic, sexual, swaggering and melancholic themes. The album debuted at number four on the US Billboard 200 and was certified gold by the Recording Industry Association of America (RIAA). Breezy was preceded by three singles; "Iffy", "WE (Warm Embrace)" and "Call Me Every Day", with the latter achieving the highest commercial success among them. At the 65th Grammy Awards, the deluxe edition of Breezy was nominated for Best R&B Album.

== Background and recording ==
Chris Brown started working on Breezy simultaneously with the release of his ninth studio album Indigo. The singer said in July 2021, while working on Breezy, that he wanted to make some "really endearing music" that "talk to women's soul". In February 2022, he stated on his Instagram account that the album would contain some pure R&B material. Brown later expressed his desire to portray "a different type of love mixed with heartbreak" in some of Breezy’s songs. The recording sessions for Breezy ended during the first days of June 2022. According to Brown, during the album's work he recorded almost 250 songs. The title of the album makes a reference to his stage nickname. During an interview with Big Boy, one week before Breezy's release, the singer said that the project is more targeted towards his female audience.

== Composition ==
Breezy is an R&B record, containing a trap-driven first half, that includes most of the album's guest appearances, and a second half channelled into a soul soundscape, where Brown delivers the majority of the album's solo performances. The standard edition of Breezy, featuring 23 tracks, marks a departure from the singer's previous, more extensive double-disc projects Heartbreak on a Full Moon and Indigo.

Breezy opens with the hip hop track "Till the Wheels Fall Off", featuring Lil Durk and Capella Grey, that runs for 5 minutes and 14 seconds, having a chorus that Brown delivers with a lower vocal register and "intense" harmonies. Lyrically, on the song the artists give a hopeful introspection over their emotional struggles caused by their personal life's harshest challenges. The second track "Catch a Body", featuring Fivio Foreign, mixes R&B and drill music, containing swaggering lyrics. The following track, "Pitch Black", is an R&B mid-tempo with sexual content, with an uncredited intro performed by Anderson .Paak. On "Possessive" Yung Bleu, Lil Wayne and Brown explore themes of jealousy, breakup and lovesickness, through a tone that was described by Miracle Oyedeji of The Inquirer as a "mixture of loving and nagging". "Need You Right Here", "Hmhmm", and "Addicted" are trap-influenced R&B tracks with hedonistic themes. "Survive the Night" is an alternative R&B track that explores the theme of drug addiction. In the song, Brown personifies drugs as a toxic lover—one who continually inflicts pain yet remains an inseparable part of his emotional landscape.

The thirteenth track, the slow-jam "Sleep at Night", introduces a tonal shift in the album, transitioning into a more "soulful" soundscape. The track was noted for showcasing the singer's falsetto. "Passing Time" is an "80's inspired" mid-tempo where the singer is conversing with his lover asking for reassurance. "WE (Warm Embrace)" is an R&B slow-jam, that contains an interpolation of Guy's 1991 single "Let's Chill". Keithan Samuels of Rated R&B commented its lyrical content saying that it "shows the tender side of Brown as he aims to sexually please his stressed-out partner the best way he can". "Forbidden" is an up-tempo pop-funk song, drawing musical inspiration from the works of Michael Jackson. "Bad Then A Beach" is an hip hop and trap influenced R&B song that features Tory Lanez. On the R&B and soul tracks "Dream", "Slide" and "Harder" the lyrics explore romance and sexual intimacy. The album's standard edition ends with "Luckiest Man", a song where Brown croons his confidence of wanting to spend the rest of his life with his loved one.

== Artwork ==
Breezy's artwork was revealed on May 18, 2022. The cover art consists of a black and white image of the back of Brown's head, with the album's title shaved into his hair. The haircut was done by American artist and barber Rob the Original. According to the barber, the haircut of the album's cover was designed by Brown and himself, and was inspired by works of Italian artist and barber Nto Hair Mugen. Shawn Grant of The Source found the artwork to be "minimal" compared to those of Brown's latest projects.

== Release and promotion ==
On November 4, 2019, Brown posted on his Instagram account three videos featuring snippets from songs that he had recently written and recorded, supposedly called "Get Naked", "Hit My Line" and "Stressed". On December 22, 2019, Brown announced that he was working on new material for his next album, posting an Instagram story where he wrote "2020, what do you think my 10th album is going to be called?". A couple months following the release of his collaborative mixtape with Young Thug, Slime & B, on July 9, 2020, he announced that the name of his tenth album would be Breezy, making a reference to his stage nickname. On October 22, 2020 he shared through his social media a snippet of a song supposedly called "On Some New Shit", in a video that showed him working and recording the song in a hotel room in London, also suggesting the possibility of releasing the album in 2021 in the video's caption. In November, Brown created an OnlyFans account, where he posted snippets from the songs "Sleep at Night" and "Warm Embarce", during his travel in Tulum, Mexico. Two days before Christmas 2020, Brown posted on his Instagram account a picture that showed a pen and a piece of paper, captioning it with "My heart on this pen and pad. A SIDE B SIDE. Hope y'all f**k with my frequency. No time soon", hinting the possibility of Breezy being his third consecutive double-album, following Heartbreak on a Full Moon and Indigo. On January 8, 2021 Forbes published an article that listed Breezy among the most anticipated R&B albums of 2021. In June 2021 he said that he was not in a rush to release his new album, by posting an Instagram story where he wrote "I ain't dropping my album until I'm ready. I need to give y'all a chance to miss me". On August 2, 2021, Brown announced on his Instagram that his Breezy album would be accompanied by a short film of the same name, however the short film ended up never being released.

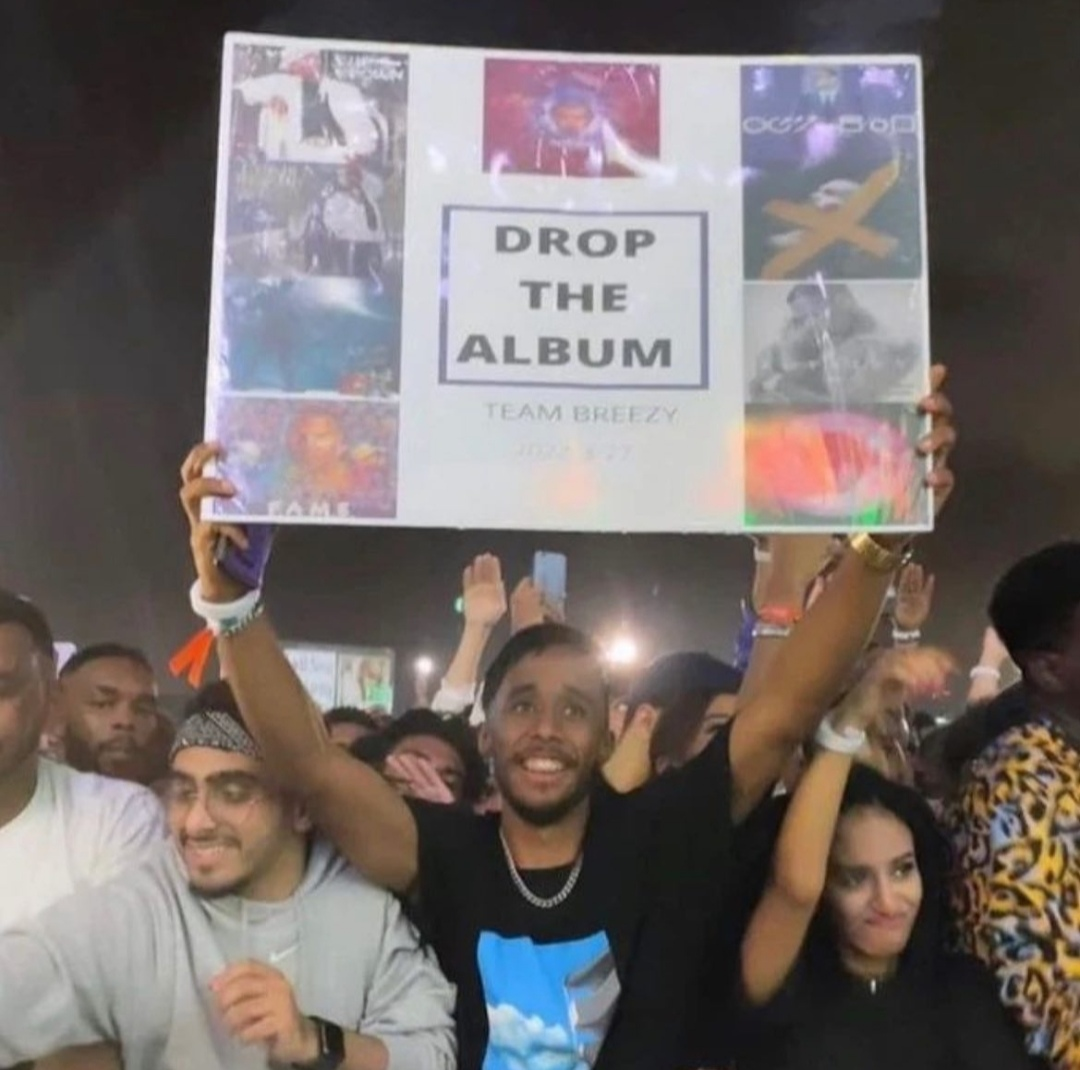
A fan holding up a sign encouraging Brown to release Breezy, during his concert in Saudi Arabia in March 2022

Months later, on December 18, he announced the release of the lead single of Breezy for January 2022. On the first day of 2022 he announced the title of the single, "Iffy", through a teaser of its music video, announcing its release for January 14, while also revealing that Breezy would have the same amount of songs of his debut album, because he wanted to "keep it classic". In March he announced that the already previewed song "Warm Embrace" would be the second single, announcing its release date for April 1, and teasing a joint tour for Summer 2022 with a mystery co-headliner. Two days before the release of the single, he revealed that Breezy would be released during summer 2022. In late April he announced his "One of Them Ones Tour" with rapper Lil Baby as a co-headlining act. On May 9 he announced that the album would be released in June. Nine days later he revealed Breezy's release date, June 24, along with its cover art, and a list of features including Lil Wayne, Blxst, H.E.R., Ella Mai, Jack Harlow, Tory Lanez, Fivio Foreign, Yung Bleu, EST Gee and Wizkid, hinting that more features could be on the album.

Brown unveiled the album's track listing on June 7, while also posting a video of him dancing to a snippet of "Possessive". Two weeks before the album's release, Brown has debuted the track "Wheels Fall Off", performing the track for the first time for the "4ShootersOnly" music platform, in a video portraying himself alone with a microphone in his backyard, while he smokes a blunt and executes the song. That same day he posted a snippet of "Call Me Every Day", featuring Nigerian artist WizKid, on his Instagram account. On June 21, he released the music video for "WE (Warm Embrace)", starring Normani and directed by Arrad. Few days prior to the album's release, Brown promoted it doing various radio interviews and podcasts located at his Los Angeles house. The singer revealed its deluxe edition's track listing two days before the album's release.

Breezy was released on June 24, 2022, by RCA Records and CBE with a standard version of 23 tracks, and another version where the lead single "Iffy" is contained as a bonus track. On July 8, the deluxe edition of the album, featuring nine new songs, was released. Later on September 2, the album was released in the CD format. On November 18, Brown released a Christmas version of the album, featuring two new Christmas-themed tracks: "It's Giving Christmas" and "No Time Like Christmas".

The album was further promoted with Brown embarking the co-headlining 2022 tour with rapper Lil Baby, "One of Them Ones Tour" in the U.S., and his European headlining concert tour in 2023, titled "Under the Influence Tour".

== Critical reception ==
Professional ratings
Review scores
Source	Rating
AllMusic	2.5/5 stars
The Inquirer	4/5 stars
HipHopDX	2.8/5

Miracle Oyedeji of The Inquirer stated that the album consists of "24 solid songs" with Brown doing "amazingly well vocally and lyrically". AllMusic editor Andy Kellman praised Breezy's "soulful" side, stating that it "contains some of the smoothest R&B he has made", but was dissatisfied with its "boastful" hip hop-infused side. Lauren Floyd of HipHopDX expressed a mixed response, stating that on the album "certain songs sway from trend to trend or the preferences of its features mask more than advertising Brown's individuality".

=== Awards and nominations ===
Awards and nominations for Breezy
Year	Ceremony	Category	Result	Ref.
2022	Soul Train Music Awards	Album of the Year	Nominated	
2023	Grammy Awards	Best R&B Album	Nominated	
2023	NAACP Image Awards	Outstanding Album	Nominated	
2023	Urban Music Awards	Best Album	Won	
2023	BET Awards	Album of the Year	Nominated	

== Commercial performance ==
In the United States, Breezy debuted at number four on the US Billboard 200 with 72,000 album-equivalent units, which included 5,000 pure album sales in its first week. This marks his 11th top-ten album in the country. The album also accumulated 87.36 million on-demand audio streams in the United States for its track list of 24 songs. Five songs from Breezy charted on the Billboard Hot 100 during its debut week, making Chris Brown surpass Elvis Presley as the eighth artist with the most entries on the Hot 100, for a total of 112 entries on the chart. In its second week, the album remained in the top ten and fell to number eight, earning 35,000 album-equivalent units. The album spent three consecutive weeks in the top ten of the Billboard 200. In 2024, the album was certified gold by the Recording Industry Association of America (RIAA).

== Track listing ==
Credits are adapted from Tidal.

Breezy track listing
No.	Title	Writer(s)	Producer(s)	Length
1.	"Till the Wheels Fall Off" (featuring Lil Durk and Capella Grey)	Chris Brown; Durk Banks; Brian Brown; Curtis Anthony Jackson II; Yacoub Kawaja; Francis Leblanc; Patrizio Pigliapoco; Jerome Phillips; Kifano Reque; Leon Youngblood	Kifa; RoccStar; Teezio^{[p]}; Fridayy^{[a]}	5:11
2.	"C.A.B. (Catch a Body)" (featuring Fivio Foreign)	C. Brown; Roark Bailey; Eric Bellinger; Nelson Bridges; Dejuan Cross; Quinton Ellis; Brandon Hesson; Nelson Kyle; Vurdell Muller; Pigliapoco; Maxie Lee Ryles III	Bailey; Cross; Deafh Beats; Keyz; Nellz; Teezio^{[v]}	4:23
3.	"Pitch Black"	C. Brown; Brandon Paak Anderson; Yusuf Ali El; Chris Bivins; Larry Gashi; Pigliapoco; Frank Rose	Rose; Ye Ali; Teezio^{[v]}	2:54
4.	"Possessive" (featuring Lil Wayne and Yung Bleu)	C. Brown; Jeremy Biddle; Dwayne Carter; Nate Rhoads	Rhoads; Teezio^{[v]}	3:53
5.	"Addicted" (featuring Lil Baby)	C. Brown; Daniel Delgado-Hernandez; Dominique Jones; Nile Waves; Youngblood	DannyProdThis; Waves; Teezio^{[v]}	3:38
6.	"Call Me Every Day" (featuring Wizkid)	C. Brown; Michael Adeyinka; Marcel Akunwata; Thierry Augustin-Lohier; Ayodeji Balogun; Youngblood	RoccStar; Blaisebeatz; Gabriel Roland^{[a]}; Teezio^{[v]}	2:26
7.	"Closure" (featuring H.E.R.)	C. Brown; Floyd Bentley; Jovan Dawkins; Ronald Ferebee Jr.; Adonis Gree; H.E.R.; Mayila Jones; Pigliapoco; Cassidy Wilmot; Joi Wynn	Yonni; Jovan J Dawkins^{[v]}	3:03
8.	"Need You Right Here" (featuring Bryson Tiller)	C. Brown; Leblanc; Pigliapoco; Reque; Bryson Tiller; Youngblood	Kifa; RoccStar; Teezio^{[v]}	3:11
9.	"Sex Memories" (featuring Ella Mai)	C. Brown; Omari Akinlolu; Jimmy Giannos; Dominic Jordan; Ella Mai; Pigliapoco; Steven Tolson	The Audibles; Teezio^{[v]}	3:31
10.	"Hmhmm" (featuring EST Gee)	C. Brown; Floyd Bentley; Pigliapoco; Deundraeus Portis; Andre Proctor; Jabreh Shaw; George Stone III; Bobby Joseph Turner, Jr.	Dre Moon; SprngBrk; Upstrz; Teezio^{[v]}	3:24
11.	"Psychic" (with Jack Harlow)	C. Brown; Nick Cassidy; Jack Harlow; Raynford Humphrey; Albrecht Lange; Anthony Leslie; Mohammed Nasrollahnejad; Okinlolu; Pigliapoco; Justin Smith	Cassidy; Lange; Nasrollahnejad; Preme; Teezio^{[v]}	3:40
12.	"Show It" (featuring Blxst)	C. Brown; Miles Barker; Matthew Burdette; John Concepcion; Jamal Gaines; Jayde Hamilton; Jeffrey Holmes; Mark Hudson; Quinton Lamar; Ellery McKinney; Pigliapoco; Charles Stephens III	Chizzy; Emack; Musik MajorX; RockBoy; Teezio^{[v]}	3:10
13.	"Sleep at Night"	C. Brown; Darius Coleman; Joshua Conerly; Gaines; Leonard E. Lowman; Thomas Lumpkins; Cooper McGill; Travis Sayles; Dylan Teixeira	Coop the Truth; Nami; Sayles; Teezio^{[v]}	3:39
14.	"Passing Time"	C. Brown; Daecolm Holland; Tyler Hotston; Gaines; Joseph Gosling; Amish Patel	Relyt; Teezio^{[v]}	3:24
15.	"WE (Warm Embrace)"	C. Brown; Derrick D. Beck; Bernard Belle; Gaines; Donameche Jackson; Wilbart McCoy III; McKinney; Pigliapoco; Teddy Riley; Keith Sweat	Don City; Teezio^{[v]}	3:54
16.	"Forbidden"	C. Brown; Travis Bruce; Gaines; Donye'a Goodin; McKinney; Matthew Montanez; Pigliapoco; Nathan J. Reyes; Stephens; Bradley Thomas Jr.	Chizzy; Teezio^{[v]}	3:38
17.	"Bad Then a Beach" (featuring Tory Lanez)	C. Brown; Samuel Jimenez; Joseph Karnes; Daystar Peterson; Pigliapoco; Jeremy Ruzumna; Jared Scharff	Pearl Lion; Queen Sixties; Smash David; Teezio^{[v]}	3:00
18.	"Survive the Night"	C. Brown; DonnyBravo; Michael Jiminez; Kawaja; Pigliapoco; Christopher Townsend; Riley Urick; Youngblood	RoccStar; DonnyBravo; Urick; XZ; Teezio^{[a]}^{[v]}	3:07
19.	"Dream"	C. Brown; Eddy Bizimana; David Burgess; Kaniel Castaneda; Concepcion; Arnold Dudley Jr.; Gaines; William Gittens; Dylan Graham; Rashad Johnson; Joseph Moses; Tristan Rice; Aaron Rogers; Nigel Sparkes	3ddy; The Breed; Graham; KanielTheOne; Teezio^{[v]}	3:10
20.	"Slide"	C. Brown; Gaines; Lance Hunter; Pigliapoco; Julian B. Ray; Wilbert Richardson; David Sampson	Sefru; Teezio^{[v]}	2:33
21.	"Harder"	C. Brown; Michael Archer; Shaun Carrington; Coleman; Conerly; Gaines; Lumpkins; Raphael Saadiq; Sayles; Teixeira	Nami; Sayles; Carrington; Yng Josh; Teezio^{[v]}	3:08
22.	"On Some New Shit"	C. Brown; Coleman; Conerly; Gaines; Lowman; Lumpkins; Pigliapoco; Sayles	Sayles; Yng Josh; Teezio^{[v]}	2:50
23.	"Luckiest Man"	C. Brown; Joel Anguita; Angel Brinks; Benjamin Harry; Kevin Kessee; Chul Lee; Gabriel Roland; Orlando Williamson; Youngblood	RoccStar; Roland; Anguita; Harry; Seoul; Williamson; Teezio^{[v]}	2:30
Total length:				77:40

Breezy bonus track
No.	Title	Writer(s)	Producer(s)	Length
24.	"Iffy"	C. Brown; Bellinger; Lumidee Cedeño; Michael Elizondo; Gaines; Curtis Jackson; M. Jiminez; S. Jimenez; Dominique Logan; Steven Marsden; Teddy Mendez; Joshua Parker; Edwin Perez; Pigliapoco; Andre Young	Blaq Tuxedo; OG Parker; Smash David	2:53
Total length:				80:10

Breezy (Deluxe) additional tracks
No.	Title	Writer(s)	Producer(s)	Length
25.	"Hit My Line"	C. Brown; Paul Momberger; Sean Momberger; Pigliapoco	S. Momberger; Teezio^{[v]}	2:38
26.	"Inner Peace" (featuring Anderson .Paak)	C. Brown; Anderson; Anthony Clemons Jr.; Uforo Ebong	BongoByTheWay; Teezio^{[v]}	4:46
27.	"Talm' Bout"	C. Brown; Brian Bates; Gaines; Torin Martinez; Pigliapoco; Terence Thomas; Tre'Von Waters	Killah B; Teezio^{[v]}	3:03
28.	"Hate Me Tomorrow"	C. Brown; Bentley; Dominique Logan	SprngBrk; Blaq Tuxedo; Teezio^{[v]}	3:35
29.	"Hate Being Human"	C. Brown; Gregory Hein; Pigliapoco; Peter Rycroft	Lostboy; Teezio^{[v]}	2:35
30.	"Nobody Has to Know" (featuring Davido)	C. Brown; Christopher Dotson; Kevin Hissink; Orkhan Orujov; Pigliapoco; Jamie Sanderson	Hissink; Okan; Sermstyle; Shizzi^{[a]}; Teezio^{[v]}	2:59
31.	"Special Delivery"	C. Brown; Burgess; Johnson; Muhssiah Lott; Pigliapoco; Rogers; Sparkes	The Breed; Teezio^{[v]}	2:50
32.	"Petty"	C. Brown; Gaines; McKinney; Pigliapoco; B. Thomas; Elliott Trent; Ryan Williamson	Rykeyz; Teezio^{[v]}	3:03
33.	"In the City"	C. Brown; Yonatan Ayal; Gaines; Darius Logan; Dominique Logan; Pigliapoco; Patrick Smith; Yonatan Watts; Dewain Whitmore Jr.	Blaq Tuxedo; xSDTRK; Watts; Teezio^{[v]}	4:21
Total length:				110:00

Breezy – It's Giving Christmas additional tracks
No.	Title	Writer(s)	Producer(s)	Length
1.	"It's Giving Christmas"	C. Brown; Rayan El-Hussein Goufar; Johnson; Holland; Nima Jahanbin; Paimon Jahanbin; Pigliapoco; Rayo; Rogers; Sparkes; Aaron Strickland	The Breed; Wallis Lane; Teezio^{[v]}	3:16
2.	"No Time Like Christmas"	C. Brown; Omololu Akinlolu; Dotson; Xeryus Gittens; Pigliapoco; Corey Stampley; Christian Ward	Chrishan; CS Keys; Hitmaka; Teezio^{[v]}	3:19
Total length:				116:35

=== Notes ===
- ^{^[p]} indicates a primary and vocal producer.
- ^{^[a]} indicates an additional producer.
- ^{^[v]} indicates a vocal producer.

=== Sample credits ===
- "Psychic" contains a sample from "Me & U", written by Ryan Leslie, as performed by Cassie.
- "WE (Warm Embrace)" contains a portion of the composition "Let's Chill", written by Bernard Belle, Teddy Riley, Keith Sweat, as performed by Guy.
- "Dream" contains a sample from "What They Want", written by Joe Moses, Kaniel Castaneda, as performed by Joe Moses.
- "Harder" contains a portion of the composition "Untitled (How Does It Feel)", written by D'Angelo, Raphael Saadiq, as performed by D'Angelo
- "Iffy" contains a sample from "Drag Rap" by The Showboys and contains interpolations of "In da Club", written by Curtis Jackson, Andre Young, and Mike Elizondo, as performed by 50 Cent & "Never Leave You (Uh Oooh, Uh Oooh)", written by Lumidee Cedeño, Teddy Mendez, Edwin Perez, Steven Marsden, as performed by Lumidee.

== Personnel ==
Credits are adapted from Tidal.

=== Musicians ===
- Chris Brown – vocals
- Anderson .Paak – vocals (track 3)
- Tyler James Hotston – bass, drums, keyboards, strings (14)
- Brandon Brown – bass (15)
- Adam Tahere – vocal effects (15)
- Wilbert Richardson – background vocals (20)
- Blaq Tuxedo – programming (24)
- OG Parker – programming (24)
- Smash David – programming (24)
- Ant Clemons – vocals (26)
- William Wesson – violin (27)
- Aldae – background vocals (29)
- Lostboy – background vocals (29)

=== Technical ===
- Connor Hedge – engineering (1–24)
- Justin Gibson – engineering (1)
- Ben "Bengineer" Chang – engineering (6, 9)
- Ignacio Portales – engineering assistance (1–7, 10–17, 19–23, 25–33)
- Katie Harvey – engineering assistance (15, 24–33)
- Ashley Marie Jackson – engineering assistance (18)
- Patrizio "Teezio" Pigliapoco – recording, mixing
- Justina Bryce – recording (1)
- Manny Galvez – recording (4)
- Nathaniel Alford – recording (4)
- Angie Randisi – recording (5)
- Mattazik Muzik – recording (5)
- Aidan Duncan – recording (6)
- Leandro Hidalgo – recording (6)
- Miki Tsutsumi – recording (7)
- Nickie Jon Pabón – recording, mixing (11)
- Blxst – recording (12)
- Johann Chavez – recording (17)
- Sebastian Romero – recording (17)
- Bainz – mixing (1)
- Eric "Vekz" Fernandez – mixing (10)
- Jhair Lazo – mixing (26)
- Dale Becker – mastering

== Charts ==
=== Weekly charts ===
Weekly chart performance for Breezy
Chart (2022)	Peak position
Australian Albums (ARIA)	6
Australian Hip Hop/R&B Albums (ARIA)	3
Austrian Albums (Ö3 Austria)	30
Belgian Albums (Ultratop Flanders)	37
Belgian Albums (Ultratop Wallonia)	58
Canadian Albums (Billboard)	7
Danish Albums (Hitlisten)	22
Dutch Albums (Album Top 100)	6
French Albums (SNEP)	39
German Albums (Offizielle Top 100)	25
Irish Albums (Official Charts)	41
Japanese Download Albums (Billboard Japan)	58
New Zealand Albums (RMNZ)	2
Nigerian Albums (TurnTable)	35
Norwegian Albums (VG-lista)	10
Swiss Albums (Schweizer Hitparade)	9
UK Albums (Official Charts)	6
UK R&B Albums (Official Charts)	4
US Billboard 200	4
US Top R&B/Hip-Hop Albums (Billboard)	2

=== Year-end charts ===
2022 year-end chart performance for Breezy
Chart (2022)	Position
US Billboard 200	147
US Top R&B/Hip-Hop Albums (Billboard)	50

== Certifications ==
Certifications for Breezy
Region	Certification	Certified units/sales
New Zealand (RMNZ)	Platinum	15,000^{‡}
United Kingdom (BPI)	Silver	60,000^{‡}
United States (RIAA)	Gold	500,000^{‡}
^{‡} Sales+streaming figures based on certification alone.

== Release history ==
Release dates and formats for Breezy
Region	Date	Label(s)	Edition(s)	Format(s)
Various	June 24, 2022	CBE; RCA	Standard	Digital download; streaming
Various	July 8, 2022	CBE; RCA	Deluxe	Digital download; streaming
Various	September 2, 2022	CBE; RCA	Standard	CD
Various	November 18, 2022	CBE; RCA	It's Giving Christmas	Digital download; streaming
