= No Time Like Christmas =

Song by Chris Brown

from the album Breezy - It's Giving Christmas
- A-side: "It's Giving Christmas"
- Released: November 18, 2022
- Recorded: November 2022
- Genre: Soul; R&B
- Length: 3:19
- Label: CBE; RCA
- Lyricists: Chris Brown; Christopher Dotson; Omari Akinlolu
- Producers: Hitmaka; CS Keys; Xeryus Gittens; Patrizio Pigliapoco

Music video
- "No Time Like Christmas" on YouTube

"No Time Like Christmas" is a song by American singer Chris Brown, released on November 18, 2022 as a promotional single, alongside the song "It's Giving Christmas", from the Christmas edition of the singer's tenth solo studio album, titled Breezy - It's Giving Christmas.

== Background and release ==
During the first days of November 2022, Brown stated that he was making one new Christmas song, titled “It’s Giving Christmas”, a play on the popular African American colloquial phrase. On November 14, 2022, Brown revealed the release of two Christmas songs, writing on his Instagram story “2 Christmas (Songs) Dropping The 17th”: “It’s Giving Christmas” and “No Time Like Christmas”. The song was written by Chris Brown, Christopher Dotson and Omari Akinlolu, while its production was handled by Hitmaka and CS Keys, with additional production from guitarist Xeryus Gittens. "No Time Like Christmas" was recorded in November 2022 by Jenso "JP" Plymouth, and mixed by Patrizio Pigliapoco. The tracks marked Brown's fourth and fifth Christmas songs, following his 2007 cover versions of "This Christmas" and "Try a Little Tenderness, and his 2017 track "This X-Mas" featuring Ella Mai, contained in the Cuffing Season: 12 Days of Christmas edition of his eighth studio album Heartbreak on a Full Moon.

== Composition ==
"No Time Like Christmas" was described as a "piano-laced" and "soulful" R&B and soul ballad, that lyrically takes on a romantic and sexual feel with Brown singing to his lover: “Wrappin’ all my love in a box / your name’s written at the top / how I want to feel you come closer, girl, don’t stop / I know you wanna get your gift / I’m crossin’ off your Christmas list”. The track also features electric guitar chords played by Xeryus Gittens.

== Critical reception ==
According to The Telegraph, "The song plays on Brown’s R&B strengths" while also "revelling in the merry Christmas spirit". Rated R&B stated that the song, in comparison to “It’s Giving Christmas”, "sets the mood for another type of gift exchange — one that happens between the sheets". Rap Up commented that "with a pair of seasonal tunes, “It’s Giving Christmas” and “No Time Like Christmas”, Breezy spreads comfort and joy with his festive two-pack, which is sure to put you in the Christmas spirit." HipHopDX wrote that "“No Time Like Christmas” hears Breezy serenading the object of his affection with a sultry, slow jam featuring a mix of suggestive and romantic lyrics".

== Music video ==
The visual for "No Time Like Christmas" was released on December 9, 2023, alongside the one for "It's Giving Christmas". Both clips show Brown performing with his band in a room with starry effects, matching the Christmas theme from both songs.

== Track listing ==
- Digital download and streaming
1. "It's Giving Christmas" – 3:16
2. "No Time Like Christmas" – 3:19

== Charts ==
Chart performance for "No Time Like Christmas"
Chart (2022)	Peak position
US Holiday Digital Song Sales (Billboard)	12
