= 2022 Soul Train Music Awards =

Music awards ceremony in Las Vegas, US

Soul Train Music Awards
- Date: November 26, 2022
- Location: Orleans Arena, Las Vegas, Nevada
- Country: United States
- Hosted by: Deon Cole
- Most awards: Beyoncé (3)
- Most nominations: Beyoncé; Mary J. Blige; (7 each)
- Website: www.bet.com/shows/soul-train-awards/

Television/radio coverage
- Network: BET, BET Her, VH1, MTV2

The 2022 Soul Train Music Awards took place on November 26, 2022, recognizing the best in soul, R&B and Hip-Hop music. The ceremony aired on BET, BET Her, Vh1 and MTV2, with comedian and writer Deon Cole hosting the ceremony. On October 20, 2022, BET announced the nominees, Mary J. Blige and Beyoncé lead with seven nominations each; followed by Ari Lennox with six; and Lizzo and Chris Brown each having received five nominations.

== Special awards ==
Honorees are as listed below:

=== Legend Award ===
Morris Day & the Time

=== Lady of Soul Award ===
Xscape

== Winners and nominees ==
Nominees are listed after the winner.

Album of the Year	Song of the Year
Renaissance – Beyoncé: An Evening with Silk Sonic – Bruno Mars, Anderson .Paak, Silk Sonic; Away Message – Ari Lennox; Breezy – Chris Brown; Good Morning Gorgeous – Mary J. Blige; Heaux Tales, Mo' Tales: The Deluxe – Jazmine Sullivan; R&B Money – Tank; Special – Lizzo	"Break My Soul" – Beyoncé: "About Damn Time" – Lizzo; "Bad Habit" – Steve Lacy; "Good Morning Gorgeous" – Mary J. Blige; "Hrs and Hrs" – Muni Long; "Last Last" – Burna Boy; "Pressure" – Ari Lennox
Best R&B/Soul Female Artist	Best R&B/Soul Male Artist
Jazmine Sullivan: Ari Lennox; Beyoncé; H.E.R.; Lizzo; Mary J. Blige; SZA; Tems	Chris Brown: Babyface; Brent Faiyaz; Burna Boy; Charlie Wilson; Giveon; Lucky Daye; PJ Morton
Best New Artist	Soul Train Certified Award
Tems: CKay; Coco Jones; DIXSON; Doechii; Fireboy DML; Muni Long; Steve Lacy	Mary J. Blige: Chaka Khan; Charlie Wilson; Diana Ross; Maxwell; PJ Morton; Ronald Isley & The Isley Brothers; T-Pain
Best Gospel/Inspirational Award	Video of the Year
Maverick City Music X Kirk Franklin: Cece Winans; Erica Campbell; Fred Hammond; MAJOR.; Marvin Sapp; Tamela Mann; Tasha Cobbs Leonard	"Smokin out the Window" – Bruno Mars, Anderson .Paak, Silk Sonic: "About Damn Time" – Lizzo; "Bad Habit" – Steve Lacy; "Good Morning Gorgeous" – Mary J. Blige; "Have Mercy" – Chlöe; "Hrs and Hrs" – Muni Long; "Last Last" – Burna Boy; "Pressure" – Ari Lennox
Best Dance Performance	Best Collaboration
"About Damn Time" – Lizzo: "Call Me Every Day" – Chris Brown featuring Wizkid; "Have Mercy" – Chlöe; "Persuasive" – Doechii; "Pressure" – Ari Lennox; "Smokin out the Window" – Bruno Mars, Anderson .Paak, Silk Sonic; "WE (Warm Embrace)" – Chris Brown; "Woman" – Doja Cat	"Make Me Say It Again, Girl" – Ronald Isley & The Isley Brothers featuring Beyoncé: "Amazing" – Mary J. Blige featuring DJ Khaled; "Be Like Water" – PJ Morton featuring Stevie Wonder & Nas; "Call Me Every Day" – Chris Brown featuring Wizkid; "Gotta Move On" – Diddy featuring Bryson Tiller; "Hate Our Love" – Queen Naija & Big Sean; "Move" – Beyoncé featuring Grace Jones and Tems; "Slow" – Tank featuring J. Valentine
The Ashford & Simpson Songwriter's Award
"Hrs and Hrs" – Written and performed by Muni Long: "Bad Habit" – Written by Steve Lacy, Diana Gordon, John Kirby, Britanny Fousheé and Matthew Castellanos (Steve Lacy); "Break My Soul" – Written by Beyoncé, Terius Nash, Christopher Stewart, Jens Christian Isaken, Shawn Carter, Freddie Ross, Adam Pigott, Allen George and Fred McFarlane (Beyoncé); "Church Girl" – Written by Beyoncé, Terius Nash, Ernest Wilson, Elbernita Clark, Jimi Payton, Dion Norman, Derrick Ordogne, James Brown, Orville Hall, Phillip Price, Ralph MacDonald and William Salter (Beyoncé); "Good Morning Gorgeous" – Written by Mary J. Blige, D'Mile, H.E.R., David D. Brown and Tiara Thomas (Mary J, Blige); "I Hate U" – Written by SZA, Robert Bisel, Cody Fayne, Carter Lang and Dylan Patrice (SZA); "Last Last" – Written by Burna Boy, LaShawn Daniels, Harvey Mason Jr., Fred Jerkins III, Rodney Jerkins, Mikael Haataja, Samuel Haataja, James Olagundoye, Santeri Kauppinen and Robert Laukkanen (Burna Boy); "Pressure" – Written by Ari Lennox, Anthony Parrino, Jai'Len Josey, Bryan-Michael Cox, Jermaine Dupri and Johntá Austin (Ari Lennox)
