= Don't Check on Me =

2019 promotional single by Chris Brown featuring Justin Bieber and INK

Promotional single by Chris Brown featuring Justin Bieber and Ink

from the album Indigo
- Released: June 25, 2019
- Genre: R&B; soul; acoustic pop
- Length: 3:25
- Label: RCA
- Songwriters: Christopher Brown; Justin Bieber; Atia "Ink" Boggs; Sheldon Ferguson; Jason Boyd; Donny Flores; Mark A. Pitts; Keith Thomas
- Producer: Ferguson

Audio video
- "Don't Check on Me" on YouTube

"Don't Check on Me" is a song by American singer Chris Brown, featuring vocals from Canadian singer Justin Bieber and American singer Ink. It was released as a promotional single from Brown's ninth studio album, Indigo, on June 25, 2019.

== Background and composition ==
The song features an acoustic guitar riff, similar to past songs such as Brown's "With You" and Bieber's "Love Yourself". It is the first collaboration between the two artists since 2011's "Next to You". The song's lyrical content concerns moving on from a past relationship, with both Brown, Bieber, and Ink advising their former lovers to stop checking in on them and that the relationship ended for a reason.

== Charts ==
Chart performance for "Don't Check on Me"
Chart (2019)	Peak position
Australia (ARIA)	20
Austria (Ö3 Austria Top 40)	58
Canada Hot 100 (Billboard)	48
Czech Republic Singles Digital (ČNS IFPI)	79
Denmark (Tracklisten)	23
Germany (GfK)	93
Greece (IFPI)	43
Ireland (IRMA)	40
Lithuania (AGATA)	40
Netherlands (Single Top 100)	70
New Zealand (Recorded Music NZ)	13
Norway (VG-lista)	18
Portugal (AFP)	61
Scotland Singles (Official Charts)	81
Sweden (Sverigetopplistan)	52
Switzerland (Schweizer Hitparade)	48
UK Singles (Official Charts)	29
UK Hip Hop/R&B (Official Charts)	15
US Billboard Hot 100	67
US Rolling Stone Top 100	23

== Certifications ==
Certifications for "Don't Check on Me"
Region	Certification	Certified units/sales
Australia (ARIA)	Gold	35,000^{‡}
Canada (Music Canada)	Gold	40,000^{‡}
Denmark (IFPI Danmark)	Gold	45,000^{‡}
New Zealand (RMNZ)	Platinum	30,000^{‡}
United Kingdom (BPI)	Silver	200,000^{‡}
United States (RIAA)	Gold	500,000^{‡}
^{‡} Sales+streaming figures based on certification alone.
