= Wobble Up =

2019 single by Chris Brown

Single by Chris Brown featuring Nicki Minaj and G-Eazy

from the album Indigo
- Released: April 18, 2019
- Recorded: 2019
- Genre: Bounce
- Length: 3:42
- Label: RCA
- Songwriters: Chris Brown; Onika Tanya Maraj; Gerald Earl Gillum; J. R. Rotem; Theron Thomas; Renetta Lowe; Byron Thomas; Billie Calvin
- Producer: J. R. Rotem

Chris Brown singles chronology
| "Back to Love" (2019) | "Wobble Up" (2019) | "Light It Up" (2019) |

Nicki Minaj singles chronology
| "Dumb Blonde" (2019) | "Wobble Up" (2019) | "BAPS" (2019) |

G-Eazy singles chronology
| "West Coast" (2019) | "Wobble Up" (2019) | "Blank Marquee" (2019) |

Music video
- "Wobble Up" on YouTube

"Wobble Up" is a song by American singer Chris Brown featuring Trinidadian rapper Nicki Minaj and American rapper G-Eazy. "Wobble Up" is a bounce track, and its production samples “Monkey on the D$ck” (1996), originally produced by Mannie Fresh and performed by Magnolia Shorty. “Wobble Up” was released on April 18, 2019, as the third single from Brown's ninth studio album Indigo.

== Background and composition ==
The song was written by its performers, and produced by J. R. Rotem. "Wobble Up" contains a sample of "Monkey on tha D$ck" (1997) by the late Cash Money rap artist Magnolia Shorty, for which its composers are credited as writers. The song marks Chris Brown's seventh collaboration with Nicki Minaj and third with G-Eazy, and the first between Minaj and G-Eazy.

"Wobble Up" is a bounce track about twerking. HotNewHipHop described its lyrical content as "hedonistic fun" and "x-rated". Brown performs the song's chorus and its first and last verse, Nicki Minaj raps the second verse with an up-tempo flow, while G-Eazy raps the third verse with lyrics about buying women several material gifts.

== Music video ==
Chris Brown released the music video for "Wobble Up" on May 20, 2019. American rapper Tyga and internet celebrity Dan Rue make cameos in the video. The video was directed by Brown and Arrad Rahgoshay. One day following its release, the team behind the video was accused by German artist Marius Sperlich for stealing and copying his artworks.

Billboard and Rap-Up praised the dancing in the video, while Complex commended its "computer-generated tropical backdrops" and the visuals' "vibrant color contrast".

== Credits and personnel ==
Credits adapted from Tidal.

- J. R. Rotem – production, lyrics
- Chris Brown – vocals, lyrics
- Nicki Minaj – vocals, lyrics
- G-Eazy – vocals, lyrics
- Magnolia Shorty – background vocals, lyrics
- Billie Calvin – lyrics
- Theron Thomas – lyrics
- Byron O. Thomas – lyrics
- Randy Merrill – mastering engineer
- Ben "Bengineer" Chang – assistant engineer
- Patrizio Pigliapoco – mixing, recording engineer
- Aubry "Big Juice" Delaine – misc. producer

== Charts ==
=== Weekly charts ===
Weekly chart performance for "Wobble Up"
| Chart (2019) | Peak position |
|---|---|
| New Zealand Hot Singles (RMNZ) | 15 |
| US Bubbling Under Hot 100 (Billboard) | 3 |
| US Hot R&B/Hip-Hop Songs (Billboard) | 46 |
| US R&B/Hip-Hop Airplay (Billboard) | 22 |
| US Rhythmic Airplay (Billboard) | 18 |

=== Year-end charts ===
2019 year-end chart performance for "Wobble Up"
| Chart (2019) | Position |
|---|---|
| US Hot R&B Songs (Billboard) | 36 |

== Certifications ==
Certifications for "Wobble Up"
| Region | Certification | Certified units/sales |
|---|---|---|
| New Zealand (RMNZ) | Gold | 15,000^{‡} |
| United States (RIAA) | Gold | 500,000^{‡} |
^{‡} Sales+streaming figures based on certification alone.
