= Indigo (Chris Brown song) =

Song by Chris Brown

from the album Indigo
- Released: June 28, 2019
- Studio: Calabasas Sound, Los Angeles
- Genre: R&B; trap
- Length: 3:12
- Label: RCA; CBE
- Songwriters: Christopher Brown; Eric Bellinger
- Producers: OG Parker; Scott Storch; Romano; Soundz

Audio video
- "Indigo" on YouTube

"Indigo" is a song by American singer Chris Brown. It serves as the opening track of his ninth studio album of the same name (2019). Despite not being released as a single, the song was certified Platinum by the Recording Industry Association of America (RIAA).

== Development and composition ==
"Indigo" was written by Brown and frequent collaborator Eric Bellinger, and produced by OG Parker, Scott Storch, Romano and Soundz. The song was recorded by Patrizio Pigliapoco at Calabasas Sound in Los Angeles. Musically, "Indigo" is an R&B and trap song. The track's lyrics mix spiritual awakening with sexuality, referring to body chakras and colors' emotions.

== Live performances ==
"Indigo" was performed by Brown as the first track from the setlists of his Indigoat Tour (2019) and Under the Influence Tour (2023).

== Charts ==
Chart performance for "Indigo"
Chart (2019)	Peak position
New Zealand (NZ Hot Singles Chart)	7
US Bubbling Under Hot 100 (Billboard)	10
US Hot R&B/Hip-Hop Songs (Billboard)	48

== Certifications ==
Certifications for "Indigo"
Region	Certification	Certified units/sales
New Zealand (RMNZ)	Gold	15,000^{‡}
United States (RIAA)	Platinum	1,000,000^{‡}
^{‡} Sales+streaming figures based on certification alone.
