= WE (Warm Embrace) =

2022 single by Chris Brown

Single by Chris Brown

from the album Breezy
- Released: April 1, 2022
- Recorded: 2020–22
- Genre: R&B; hip hop soul
- Length: 3:55
- Label: RCA; CBE
- Songwriters: Chris Brown; Ellery "EMack" McKinney; Wilbart McCoy III; Bernard Belle; Teddy Riley
- Lyricists: Christopher Brown; Ellery "EMack" McKinney; Wilbart McCoy III
- Producer: Don City

Chris Brown singles chronology
"Iffy" (2022)	"WE (Warm Embrace)" (2022)	"Monalisa (Remix)" (2022)

Music video
- "Warm Embrace" on YouTube

"WE (Warm Embrace)", also known by the simplified title "Warm Embrace", is a song by American singer and songwriter Chris Brown, released by RCA Records as the second single from his tenth studio album, Breezy, on April 1, 2022. Brown co-wrote the song with Ellery McKinney and Wilbart McCoy III and contains an interpolation of Guy's 1991 single "Let's Chill". The song garnered positive reviews from critics, that praised the singer's vocal performance and the track's content. "Warm Embrace" debuted and peaked at numbers 22 and 79 on both the Billboard Hot R&B/Hip-Hop Songs and Hot 100 charts respectively, and was certified Gold by the Recording Industry Association of America (RIAA). An accompanying music video for the single was directed by Arrad and features American singer Normani.

== Background ==
In November 2020, Brown created an OnlyFans account, where he previewed snippets of two songs, titled "Sleep at Night" and "Warm Embarce", off his then-upcoming Breezy album. Following the release of "Iffy", in March 2022 he announced that "Warm Embrace" would be the second single from Breezy, announcing its release date for April 1, alongside teasing a joint tour for Summer 2022 with a mystery co-headliner. On March 15, 2022, Brown shared a snippet of the song on his Instagram account with the caption "Is this the BREEZY you've been waiting for?". The song was released on April 1, 2022, as the second single from his tenth studio album, Breezy.

== Composition ==
"Warm Embrace" is an R&B slow-jam, that contains an interpolation of Guy's 1991 single "Let's Chill". According to Vibe the "romantic" content of the song "eases away from his recent trajectory of hyper-sexual music" being part of the crooner's "soft side". Brown starts the song's second verse by singing: "Take my chance and dive into your ocean, yeah / Tried my best to give you all that you want / Girl, before you leave, let me love every part of your anatomy / And I want you to pour your pain on me". Keithan Samuels of Rated R&B commented "Warm Embrace"'s lyrical content saying that it "shows the tender side of Brown as he aims to sexually please his stressed-out partner the best way he can".

== Critical reception ==
"WE (Warm Embrace)" received critical acclaim. Vibe's reviewer Mya Abraham praised the track as "endearing", and stated its sound is reminiscent of ’80s R&B. Keithan Samuels of Rated R&B found the song to be "sweet-sounding". HotNewHipHop called it a "sensual slow jam", and complimented its "clever interpolation". The song was listed among the top 5 best R&B songs of 2022 by Vibe: "["Warm Embrace"] will go down in history as one of Chris Brown’s most timeless songs".

== Commercial performance ==
On the week of July 9, 2022, "WE (Warm Embrace)" debuted and peaked at numbers 22 and 79 on both the Billboard Hot R&B/Hip-Hop Songs and Hot 100 charts respectively.

== Music video ==
The song's accompanying music video was released on June 21, 2022, and features a cameo by American singer Normani. Additionally, it was directed by Arrad. The video was nominated for "Video of the Year" at BET Awards 2023, and for "Best Dance Performance" at 2022 Soul Train Music Awards.

=== Synopsis ===
The video starts with Brown falling into a dark-turned-multicolor abyss as a sneak peek of his track "Sleep at Night" soundtracks his dreamy descent. Brown abruptly wakes up, finding his girl, interpreted by American singer Normani, wearing a silk bustier slip dress that sweeps the floor she and Brown waltz on. The two slip out of their titular warm embrace and have an underwater kiss as he croons, “Take my chance and dive into your ocean”. The video continues alternating visuals of Brown performing the song with a band on a seafront, his shadow dancing in a yellow-neon-lighted scenario, the crooner singing the song in a room full of kaleidoscopical mirrors, and the two lovers expressing their mutual sentiment on the frontseat of a vintage Mercedes-Benz until a mysterious light makes them float into a UFO.

== Charts ==
Chart performance for "WE (Warm Embrace)"
Chart (2022)	Peak position
New Zealand Hot Singles (RMNZ)	4
South Africa Streaming (TOSAC)	59
US Billboard Hot 100	79
US Adult R&B Songs (Billboard)	27
US Hot R&B/Hip-Hop Songs (Billboard)	22
US R&B/Hip-Hop Airplay (Billboard)	13

== Certifications ==
Certifications for "WE (Warm Embrace)"
Region	Certification	Certified units/sales
New Zealand (RMNZ)	Gold	15,000^{‡}
United States (RIAA)	Gold	500,000^{‡}
^{‡} Sales+streaming figures based on certification alone.
