= Indigo (Chris Brown album) =

Studio album by Chris Brown
- Released: June 28, 2019
- Recorded: 2018–19
- Studios: Calabasas Sound, Los Angeles; CBE, Tarzana
- Genres: R&B; pop
- Length: 123:08
- Labels: Black Pyramid; CBE; RCA
- Producers: J-Louis; 40; A1; Allen Ritter; Almatic; Amadeus; Andre Harris; Avedon; Ayo; Boi-1da; Cam Wallace; Cardiak; Chizzy; Clint Ford; D. A. Doman; Damon Thomas; Dave Sava6e; Dem Jointz; DiMuro; Don City; EVO; DY; Frank Dukes; Gezin; Goldy, Jr.; Hitmaka; Ink; ISM; J. R. Rotem; Jack Jones; July the Producer; Kevin Cossom; Keyz; Los Da Mystro; Marco Mavy; Mike Gonek; Nick Fouryn; OG Parker; Onlyxne; Oligee; Preme; Rich Skillz; RoccStar; Romano; Scott Storch; Sheldon Ferguson; Shndō; Smash David; Snipe Young; Teddy Walton; The Rascals; Troy Ambroff; Soundz; Vinylz; Wallis Lane; Xeryus G

Chris Brown chronology
Heartbreak on a Full Moon (2017)	Indigo (2019)	Slime & B (2020)

Singles from Indigo
- 1. "Undecided" Released: January 4, 2019; 2. "Back to Love" Released: April 11, 2019; 3. "Wobble Up" Released: April 18, 2019; 4. "No Guidance" Released: June 8, 2019; 5. "Heat" Released: August 27, 2019

Deluxe edition cover
- Indigo (Extended)

Singles from Indigo (Extended)
- 1. "Under the Influence" Released: September 6, 2022

Indigo is the ninth studio album by the American singer Chris Brown, released on June 28, 2019, by RCA Records. His second double album, it is a follow-up to his eighth album Heartbreak on a Full Moon (2017). Brown worked with several producers, including Smash David, Soundz, Hitmaka, Boi-1da, Scott Storch, OG Parker and many others. The album also features several guest appearances, including Nicki Minaj, G-Eazy, Tory Lanez, Tyga, Justin Bieber, Juicy J, Juvenile, H.E.R., Tank, Davido, Rich the Kid, Yella Beezy, Sage the Gemini, DaniLeigh, Lil Jon, Lil Wayne, Joyner Lucas, Ink, Gunna, Trey Songz and Drake.

The recording sessions for the album began in 2018 and ended in May 2019. Musically, Indigo is an R&B album that incorporates a diverse range of genres including pop, Afrobeats, dancehall, trap and bounce music. The lyrical content explores themes of spiritual love, sex, energy and vibrations. The album features a supernatural and spiritual imagery conceived by Brown, and handled by graffiti artist Saturno, visual artist Jeff Cole, and 3D artists Circle Circle Math and Sarper Baran. Indigo garnered mixed-to-positive reviews from critics, who praised Brown's vocal performances as well as the album's production and sound, but criticized its structure.

The album debuted at number 1 on the US Billboard 200, making it his third number-one album in the US, and first in seven years, since Fortune (2012). Indigo is certified triple Platinum by the Recording Industry Association of America (RIAA), which makes this Brown's sixth multi-platinum selling album. Five official singles were released from Indigo, including: "Undecided", "Back to Love", "Wobble Up", featuring Nicki Minaj and G-Eazy, "No Guidance", featuring Drake, and "Heat", featuring Gunna. "No Guidance" was certified Diamond by the Recording Industry Association of America (RIAA), and became the highest-charting song from the album on the Billboard Hot 100, peaking at number 5, and topping the Rhythmic Airplay chart, until being unseated by the following single, "Heat", at the top spot. In 2022, the song "Under the Influence", featured in the extended edition of the album, emerged as a sleeper hit, achieving significant international success. The song was officially released as a single roughly three years following its first appearance.

== Background and recording ==
In December 2017, soon after releasing his first double-disc, Heartbreak on a Full Moon, Brown started to work on new material. At the start of 2018, he worked on two collaborative mixtapes, that ultimately went unreleased—one with R&B singer Jacquees and the other with rapper Joyner Lucas. During this time, he was also recording new material for his upcoming solo project, which was rumored to be titled Indigo.

The official recording sessions for the project, after the drafting of its concept, began in August 2018, at the end of the "Heartbreak on a Full Moon tour", with "Undecided" being the first song composed following the idealization of the album. Two songs from the extended edition, which was released three months after the original album, were composed a few years earlier: "Technology" was recorded in 2016, while "Going at It" in December 2017. The album was fully recorded and mixed at Calabasas Sound in Los Angeles, with the exception of "Undecided", being recorded and mixed at Brown's home studio, named CBE Studios.

Prior to its release the singer said that Indigo would focus on "energy, love, light, and happiness", saying that it reminded him of his previous albums Chris Brown, Graffiti and F.A.M.E.. Brown revealed during an Instagram live that the album's title is connected to the color indigo being a symbol of spirituality and inner awakening, as well as being tied in with the concept of indigo children.

== Music and lyrics ==
Indigo is an R&B album, which tends to a slightly more pop sound than its predecessor Heartbreak on a Full Moon, also containing elements of dancehall and Afrobeats. Barry Walters of Spin found some songs of the album, such as "Indigo", "BP" and "Heat", to be a merge of "classic R&B sound and stylistic, with late 2010s trap influences". The album showcases a variety of productions that incorporate the percussive elements of dancehall and bounce music, evident in tracks such as "You Like That", "Need a Stack", "Juice", "Wobble Up", "Back to Love" and "Lurkin'". Exclaim!'s Mike Juliano highlighted the "distinctive use of pitch shifted background vocals" on several tracks.

The first section of Indigo features different tracks named after colors, each crafted to depict the emotions associated with those hues. The album includes four two-part songs: "Emerald/Burgundy," "Natural Disaster/Aura," "Trust Issues/Act In," and "BP/No Judgment". Some of Indigo's themes reflect a hopeful transformation that emerges after a challenging phase in a person's life. In many parts of the album, the singer explores how love intertwines with his spiritual awakening. According to A.D. Amorosi of The Inquirer, the album's themes mix spiritual enlightenment with sexuality. In contrast to Brown's previous album Heartbreak on a Full Moon, Indigo shifts away from the raw and personal songwriting, and dark and sultry mood, embracing a more lighthearted sound and tone, still having few introspective songs like "All on Me" and "Don't Check on Me" that give a closer look at Brown's trials and tribulations.

== Artwork ==
The cover art for the album was revealed on May 14, 2019, along with the back cover. The front cover artwork was designed by graffiti artist Saturno and features a purple-haired Chris Brown's face in space, surrounded by fictional monsters and flying saucers, while the back cover, designed by visual artist Jeff Cole, continues the supernatural theme with a levitating body over a pyramid. The interior illustrations of the CD were created by 3D artists and concept designers Circle Circle Math and Sarper Baran, who collaborated on a photoshoot by Jake Miosge, Brown's official tour photographer. Saturno explained in 2021 that Brown wanted to convey "The Indigo Generation" as the concept with crystal glass text. "On the cover, you can see human consciousness, religion, political powers, greed, indoctrination, obsolete education, and new era awakening. I placed Pisces and Aquarius constellations, ... a mythological being with armor that represents the superior intelligence, ...aliens in flying saucers, ... 11:11 the number of the angel.... All of the details and figures of the artwork are connected to that world and have a meaning".

== Release and promotion ==
In December 2017, Brown showed that he was working on new songs teasing a "Michael Jackson-inspired" song on his Instagram profile, filming a video from his studio and playing the song supposedly called "Afterlife". During the first months of 2018, he posted snippets of unreleased tracks, indicating that he was working on two collaborative mixtapes, one with Jacquees, and another one with Joyner Lucas, as well as working on his album, rumored to be called Indigo.

In January 2019, Brown announced a new deal with his label RCA Records, becoming one of the youngest artists to own his masters at age 29. Indigo was announced as the first album on this deal, with the release of the first single "Undecided" on January 4, 2019. Three days later Brown stated in an Instagram post that his new album would not be as lengthy as Heartbreak on a Full Moon.

He later previewed and released the second official single from the album, "Back to Love", on April 11, 2019. The following week he released the third single from the album, "Wobble Up", featuring Nicki Minaj and G-Eazy, announcing that the album would be released in June, also confirming a summer tour with Nicki Minaj, that ended up never happening. On May 2, 2019, Brown announced the list of artists featured on the album, including Tory Lanez, Sage the Gemini, Tyga, Justin Bieber, Juicy J, Juvenile, H.E.R., Tank, Lil Jon, Lil Wayne, Joyner Lucas, Gunna and Drake. Some of these collaborations garnered significant media attention, especially the one with Drake, due to the public feud that had persisted between the two artists for several years. Two days later the singer revealed that Indigo would be a 30-track album, in reference to his 30th birthday.

During Brown's birthday party on May 5, 2019, the singer previewed several songs from the album, and announced its release for June 21, 2019, later admitting a possible postponement to a week later, on June 28. He later revealed the artwork of the album and its track list between May and June 2019. On June 8, Brown released "No Guidance" featuring Drake as a single. It debuted at number nine on the US Billboard Hot 100, making it Chris Brown's 15th top-ten song, and becoming his highest-charting song as a lead artist since 2013's "Loyal" as well.

Indigo was released on June 28, 2019. Following its release, the album did not receive any promotion through interviews or television appearances, making it Brown's first album to be promoted without any public appearances, outside his social media accounts. In August, he hinted an upcoming deluxe version of the album, which he officially confirmed on September 27. On October 4, 2019, Brown released an expanded version of Indigo entitled Indigo Extended, which included 10 additional songs, making the extended version a total of 42 songs.

In January 2020 Brown announced on his Instagram profile that the album was about to get a "mini movie" visual version. Later on March 9, 2020, he confirmed its working posting a short video snippet of futuristic graphics accompanied by the song "Red". He captioned the video with "INDIGO MOVIE STARTS PRODUCTION SOON". However the mini movie ended up never happening, with speculations that it didn't because of the starting of COVID-19 pandemic.

== Tour ==
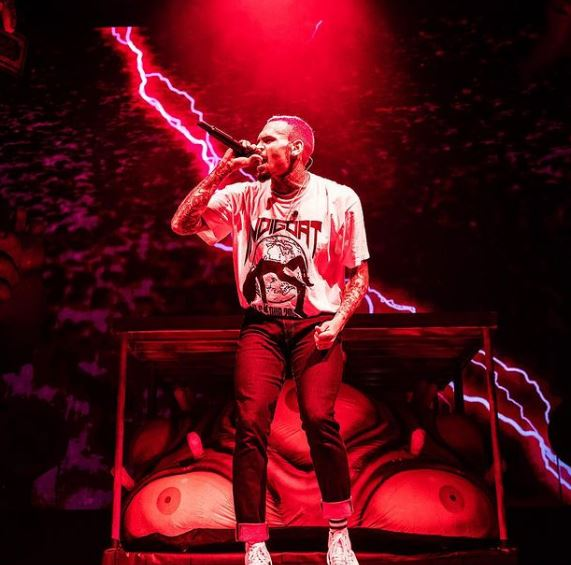
Brown performing "Burgundy" during his "Indigoat Tour"

On June 10, 2019, Chris Brown announced an official headlining concert tour where he performed the album throughout United States, titled "Indigoat Tour". The tour began on August 20 in Portland, Oregon, at Moda Center, and ended on October 19 in Anaheim, California, at the Honda Center. The opening acts for the tour were Tory Lanez, Ty Dolla $ign, Joyner Lucas and Yella Beezy.

=== Reception ===
Jay Cridlin of Tampa Bay Times said that the concert was "a guilty pleasure", wondering if enjoying his stage presence should be wrong, considering the controversies surrounding his public figure, expressing "At what point do we -- can we, should we -- forget about the blowups and restraining orders, and just marvel at the way Brown splits into a backflip and kick-spins a 360 during 'Drunk Texting'?".

The tour was considered a success, grossing over $30,100,000 in its 37 shows, selling out most of the venues, and being the third most successful hip-hop tour of 2019, after Travis Scott's "Astroworld – Wish You Were Here Tour" and Eminem's "Rapture 2019"

== Critical reception ==
Professional ratings
Review scores
Source	Rating
AllMusic	2.5/5 stars
HipHopDX	2.9/5
The Inquirer	3/5 stars

Indigo received a mixed to positive critical reception upon its release. Andy Kellman of AllMusic stated that "Not quite as extravagant as the preceding Heartbreak on a Full Moon, Chris Brown's ninth album is merely two hours in length. That still allows more than enough space for the singer to sufficiently cover each one of his modes. Pleasure-seeking club tracks, entitled slow jams, tormented ballads, and yearning pop-R&B love songs—the last of which still match up best with his voice, virtually unchanged during the last decade—are all plentiful."

In a positive review, Urban Islandz wrote that the singer "elevated himself to R&B king status" with the album. The Inquirer while reviewing Indigo stated that: "Brown knows how to craft cleverly innovative soul and market his notoriety". HipHopDX ranked it fourth best R&B album of 2019, praising the album's sound, Brown's performances and numerous collaborations, but criticizing its duration, and perceived disorganization, writing that the album features "Brown laying down A1 vocals all across its gross two-hour runtime" continuing by saying that the album is a "whiteboard of ideas and nobody bothered to find the dry eraser". Rated R&B also ranked it among the best R&B albums of the year. Danny Schwartz of HotNewHipHop defined Indigo and its predecessor Heartbreak on a Full Moon as "late-decade leviathans".

=== Awards and nominations ===
Awards and nominations for Indigo
Year	Ceremony	Category	Result	Ref.
2019	Soul Train Music Awards	Album of the Year	Nominated	
2019	American Music Awards	Favorite Soul/R&B Album	Nominated	
2020	Billboard Music Awards	Top R&B Album	Nominated	

== Commercial performance ==
In the United States, Indigo debuted at number one on the US Billboard 200 with 108,000 album-equivalent units, which included 28,000 pure album sales in its first week, making it his third number-one album in the country. The album also accumulated 97.95 million on-demand audio streams in the United States for its track list of 32 songs. In its second week, the album remained in the top ten and fell to number three, earning just under 50,000 album-equivalent units. In its third week, the album dropped to number five on the chart, earning 42,000 album-equivalent units that week. Just over a month after its release, Indigo generated over 1 billion streams. On December 9, 2019, the album was certified Platinum by the Recording Industry Association of America (RIAA) for combined sales and album-equivalent units of over a million units in the United States. Indigo was the nineteenth best-selling album of the year according to Hits, moved a total of 903,000 album-equivalent units by the end of 2019, including 84,000 pure album sales, 378,000 song sales, 1,029 billion audio-on-demand streams, and 112 million video-on-demand streams. In 2024, it was certified triple Platinum by the RIAA, which makes this Brown's sixth multi-platinum selling album. Indigo became Chris Brown's longest-running album on the Billboard 200, spending over more than three years on the chart.

In Australia, the album opened at number three on the ARIA Albums Chart, becoming Brown's sixth top-ten album in the country. In the United Kingdom, the album debuted at number seven on the UK Albums Chart, Brown's seventh top-ten album on the chart.

== Track listing ==
Disc 1 track listing
No.	Title	Writer(s)	Producer(s)	Length
1.	"Indigo"	Chris Brown; Eric Bellinger	OG Parker; Storch; Romano; Soundz	3:12
2.	"Back to Love"	Brown; Atia "Ink" Boggs; Mark Pitts	Cam Wallace; Happy Perez^{[b]}	3:41
3.	"Come Together" (featuring H.E.R.)	Brown; Gabi Wilson	Cardiak; Hitmaka; EVO^{[d]}; Isaac Wriston^{[b]}	3:54
4.	"Temporary Lover" (featuring Lil Jon)	Brown; Jonathan Smith; Bellinger; Kevin McCord	Dem Jointz	3:17
5.	"Emerald / Burgundy" (featuring Juvenile and Juicy J)	Brown; Yusuf Ali Il; Felicia Ferraro; Bellinger; Omari Akinlolu; Terius Gray; Jordan Houston; Christopher Dotson	Part 1: Storch; The Rascals; Soundz^{[b]} Part 2: OG Parker; Hitmaka; Romano	6:39
6.	"Red"	Brown	Oligee; Wallis Lane; Goldy, Jr.^{[a]}; Shndō^{[a]}; Soundz^{[b]}; Xeryus G^{[b]}; Todd Norman^{[b]}; Nicholas Carter^{[b]}	3:38
7.	"All I Want" (featuring Tyga)	Brown; Michael Nguyen-Stevenson	Wallis Lane; Preme	3:33
8.	"Wobble Up" (featuring Nicki Minaj and G-Eazy)	Brown; Onika Maraj; Gerald Gillum	J.R. Rotem	3:41
9.	"Need a Stack" (featuring Lil Wayne and Joyner Lucas)	Brown; Kaan Güneşberk; Akinlolu; Dwayne Carter; Gary Lucas	Boi-1da; Frank Dukes; Ritter	5:28
10.	"Heat" (featuring Gunna)	Brown; Sergio Kitchens	Buddah Bless	3:52
11.	"No Guidance" (featuring Drake)	Brown; Aubrey Graham; Travis Walton; Nija Charles; Tyler Bryant	Vinylz; J-Louis; 40; Walton^{[a]}	4:22
12.	"Girl of My Dreams"	Brown; Gabrielle Nowee	Snipe Young	3:22
13.	"Natural Disaster / Aura"	Brown	Part 1: OG Parker; Smash David; Romano; Soundz Part 2: Don City; Soundz^{[b]}	5:03
14.	"Don't Check on Me" (featuring Justin Bieber and Ink)	Brown; Poo Bear; Justin Bieber; Boggs	Ink; Sheldon Ferguson	3:24
15.	"Sorry Enough"	Brown; Terius Nash	Hitmaka; Los Da Mystro	4:25
Total length:				61:28

Disc 2 track listing
No.	Title	Writer(s)	Producer(s)	Length
16.	"Juice"	Brown; Antonio Stith	Zalezy; Gonek	3:25
17.	"You Like That"	Brown	A1; Chizzy; Soundz	3:04
18.	"Troubled Waters"	Brown; Dewain Whitmore, Jr.; Pitts	RoccStar; Harris; Almatic	3:13
19.	"Take a Risk"	Brown	Amadeus; DiMuro	3:32
20.	"Lurkin'" (featuring Tory Lanez)	Brown; Daystar Peterson	Rich Skillz	2:49
21.	"Trust Issues / Act In"	Brown; Dominic Woods	Part 1: Ayo; Keyz; Marco Mavy; Ford Part 2: Cossom; July the Producer	4:58
22.	"Cheetah"	Brown; Floyd "A1" Bentley; Ellaina Joseph; Bobby Turner, Jr.; Jordan George; Lyrica Anderson	A1; Chizzy	2:35
23.	"Undecided"	Brown; Ferraro; Stith	Storch; Avedon^{[a]}	3:05
24.	"BP / No Judgement"	Brown; Orlando Williamson; Akinlolu; Michael Gomez	Part 1: DY; Gezin; Onlyxne Part 2: Williamson; Thomas	6:20
25.	"Side Nigga"	Brown	Wallis Lane; Smash David; Nick Fouryn^{[a]}; Ambroff^{[a]}; Angelo Arce ^{[b]}; Michael Washington^{[b]}; Ervin Garcia ^{[b]}	3:55
26.	"Throw It Back"	Brown	J.R. Rotem	3:06
27.	"All on Me"	Brown	Snipe Young; Soundz	3:51
28.	"Sexy" (featuring Trey Songz)	Brown; Christina Gandy-Rogers; Tremaine Neverson	D. A. Doman; Matthew Haze^{[a]}	4:18
29.	"Let’s Smoke" (Physical Edition bonus track)	Brown	Rich Skillz	3:08
30.	"Early 2K" (featuring Tank)	Brown; Bellinger; Durrell Babbs	Storch; Avedon^{[a]}	3:46
Total length:				51:57

Bonus tracks
No.	Title	Writer(s)	Producer(s)	Length
31.	"Dear God"	Brown	Smash David	4:02
32.	"Part of the Plan"	Brown; Turner, Jr.; Anderson	A1; Chizzy; ISM; Jones	3:03
33.	"Play Catch Up"	Brown	Smash David; Soundz^{[a]}; Dave Sava6e^{[c]}	3:00
Total length:				62:02

Extended edition track listing
No.	Title	Writer(s)	Producer(s)	Length
1.	"Lower Body" (featuring Davido)	Brown; David Adeleke; Tiffany McKie	Kiddominant	3:03
2.	"Overtime"	Brown; Sean Small; Martin Aiono; Theron Thomas; Timothy Thomas	Sam Sumser	4:35
3.	"Under the Influence"	Brown; Adeleke; McKie	Kiddominant	3:04
4.	"Outy When I Drive / Blamed" (featuring Rich the Kid, Yella Beezy and Sage the Gemini)	Brown; Aaron Rogers; Alex Petit; Dimitri Roger; Dominic Woods; Michael Hernandez; Nigel Sparkes; Rashad Johnson	Foreign Teck; CashMoneyAP; Cubeatz; the Breed	6:30
5.	"Nose Dive" (featuring DaniLeigh)	Brown; Danielle Leigh Curiel; Omari Massenburg	Caleb "Khemasis" Nordelus; Ellery "EMack" McKinney	3:18
6.	"Flashbacks"	Brown; Elliott Trent; Lyndsey Haze; Michael Holmes; Omololu Akinlolu	DZL; RyKeyz	2:52
7.	"Problem with You"	Brown; Adele Elysee; Justin Thomas	D.A. Doman	2:14
8.	"Going at It"	Brown	D.A. Doman	2:48
9.	"Technology"	Brown; Bobby Joseph Turner, Jr.	Ashley Valentine; Melvin Moore; A1	3:28
10.	"Tell Me How You Feel" (featuring Tory Lanez)	Brown; Andre Robertson; Cardell McManus; Daystar Peterson; Kenneth Coby	Th3ory; Bizness Boi; Ye Ali	3:29
Total length:				35:21

Notes

- ^{^[a]} signifies a co-producer
- ^{^[b]} signifies an additional producer
- ^{^[c]} signifies an uncredited co-producer
- ^{^[d]} signifies an uncredited additional producer
- "Let's Smoke" was not included on streaming versions of the album internationally nor on Apple Music in the US; the track listing totaled 32 songs (42 in the extended edition).

Sample credits

- "Come Together" contains a sample from "Don't Stop", written by Albert Hudson, as performed by One Way.
- "Temporary Lover" contains a sample from "I Want To Thank You", written by Kevin McCord, as performed by Alicia Myers.
- "Emerald" contains a portion of the composition "Drag Rap (Triggerman)", written by Orville Hall, and Phillip Price, as performed by the Showboys.
- "All I Want" contains a sample from "How's It Goin' Down", written by Anthony Fields, and Earl Simmons, as performed by DMX.
- "Wobble Up" contains samples from "Monkey on the D$CK", written by Renetta Lowe, and Byron Thomas, as performed by Magnolia Shorty and "Wishing on a Star ("Dancin" Danny D Remix)", written by Billie Calvin, as performed by Fresh Four.
- "Need a Stack" contains a portion of the composition "Back That Azz Up", written by Dwayne Carter, Terius Gray, and Byron Thomas, as performed by Juvenile.
- "No Guidance" contains an uncredited sample from "Before I Die", written and performed by Che Ecru.
- "Sorry Enough" contains a sample from "Grindin'", written by Charles Hugo, Gene Thornton, Terrance Thornton, and Pharrell Williams, as performed by Clipse.
- "Undecided" contains a sample from "I Love Your Smile", written by Jarvis Barker, Sylvester Jackson, Shanice Knox, and Narada Walden, as performed by Shanice.
- "Throw It Back" contains a sample from "Back & Forth", written by Robert Kelly, George Clinton III, George Clinton Jr., William Collins, Garry Shider, David Spradley, Bernard Worrell, and Philippé Wynn, as performed by Aaliyah.
- "Let's Smoke" contains a sample from "Back Pocket", written by Christine Hucal and Theo Katzman, as performed by Vulfpeck.
- "Troubled Waters" contains a sample from "Get Me Back on Time (Engine Number 9)", written and performed by Wilson Pickett.

== Personnel ==
Instrumentation

- Lee England Jr – violin (track 24, 27, 32)
- Happy Perez – guitar (track 2)
- Xeryus Gittens – guitar (track 6)
- Todd Norman – percussion (track 6)
- Nicholas Carter – percussion (track 6)
- Isaac Wriston – bass (track 3)
- Johnathan Smith – keyboards (track 3)
- Angelo Arce – keyboards (track 25)
- Michael Washington – keyboards (track 25)
- Ervin Garcia – guitar (track 25)
- Giancarlo "EVO" Evola – guitar (track 3)

Technical

- Patrizio Pigliapoco – recording (tracks 1–4, 6–8, 10–32), mixing (tracks 1–8, 10, 12–32)
- Josh Gudwin – recording (track 14), mixing (track 14)
- Samuel Kalandjian – recording (track 26)
- Michael "Crazy Mike" Foster – recording for Juicy J (track 5)
- Christian "CQ" Quinonez – recording and mixing for Tyga (track 7)
- Aubry "Big Juice" Delaine – recording and mixing for Nicki Minaj (track 8)
- Dakarai – recording and mixing for G-Eazy (track 8)
- Matthew Testa – recording for Lil Wayne (track 9)
- Brian Eisner – recording for Joyner Lucas (track 9)
- Noel Cadastre – recording for Drake (track 11)
- Josh Gudwin – recording and mixing for Justin Bieber (track 16)
- Ruben Rivera – recording for Tank (track 29)
- Noah "40" Shebib – mixing (track 11)
- Chris Athens – mastering (tracks 1, 3–7, 9–22, 24–32)
- Randy Merrill – mastering (tracks 2, 8, 23)
- Sauce Miyagi – engineering (tracks 3, 15)
- Ben "Bengineer" Chang – engineering assistant (tracks 2, 8)
- Sourwavez – engineering assistant (track 20)
- Ashley Jackson – engineering assistant (tracks 4–6, 10, 12–19, 21–28, 31)
- Brian Chew – engineering assistant (tracks 1, 3, 30, 32)
- Elijah Marett-Hitch – engineering assistant (track 16)
- Todd Robinson – additional engineering (track 23)
- Omar Loya – vocal engineering for H.E.R. (track 3)
- Miki Tsutsumi – vocal engineering for H.E.R. (track 3)
- Alex Pyle – vocal engineering assistant for H.E.R. (track 3)

Managerial

- Chris Brown – creative direction
- Courtney Walter – creative direction, art direction, design
- Ryan Latrell Johnson – creative direction, songwriting
- Miosge – creative direction, photography
- Javon Drake - Styling
- Saturno – cover illustration
- Jeff Cole – back cover illustration
- Circle Circle Math – inside illustrations
- Sarper Baran – inside illustrations

== Charts ==
=== Weekly charts ===
2019 weekly chart performance for Indigo
Chart (2019)	Peak position
Australian Albums (ARIA)	3
Australian Urban Albums (ARIA)	1
Austrian Albums (Ö3 Austria)	31
Belgian Albums (Ultratop Flanders)	22
Belgian Albums (Ultratop Wallonia)	101
Canadian Albums (Billboard)	2
Danish Albums (Hitlisten)	8
Dutch Albums (Album Top 100)	11
Finnish Albums (Suomen virallinen lista)	47
French Albums (SNEP)	29
German Albums (Offizielle Top 100)	31
Irish Albums (IRMA)	23
Italian Albums (FIMI)	60
Japanese Digital Albums (Oricon)	29
Japanese Download Albums (Billboard Japan)	30
Japanese Hot Albums (Billboard Japan)	81
Lithuanian Albums (AGATA)	33
New Zealand Albums (RMNZ)	3
Norwegian Albums (VG-lista)	13
Portuguese Albums (AFP)	11
Scottish Albums (Official Charts)	37
South Korean Albums (Circle)	76
Spanish Albums (Promusicae)	23
Swiss Albums (Schweizer Hitparade)	9
UK Albums (Official Charts)	7
UK R&B Albums (Official Charts)	1
US Billboard 200	1
US Top R&B/Hip-Hop Albums (Billboard)	1

2022 weekly chart performance for Indigo
Chart (2022)	Peak position
Nigerian Albums (TurnTable)	24

=== Year-end charts ===
2019 year-end chart performance for Indigo
Chart (2019)	Position
Australian Albums (ARIA)	69
Australian Urban Albums (ARIA)	16
New Zealand Albums (RMNZ)	33
US Billboard 200	37
US Top R&B/Hip-Hop Albums (Billboard)	18

2020 year-end chart performance for Indigo
Chart (2020)	Position
New Zealand Albums (RMNZ)	40
US Billboard 200	51
US Top R&B/Hip-Hop Albums (Billboard)	35

2021 year-end chart performance for Indigo
Chart (2021)	Position
US Billboard 200	154

2022 year-end chart performance for Indigo
Chart (2022)	Position
US Billboard 200	189
US Top R&B/Hip-Hop Albums (Billboard)	80

2023 year-end chart performance for Indigo
Chart (2023)	Position
US Billboard 200	102
US Top R&B/Hip-Hop Albums (Billboard)	56

=== Decade-end charts ===
Decade-end chart performance for Indigo
Chart (2010–2019)	Position
US Billboard 200	180

== Certifications ==
Certifications for Indigo
Region	Certification	Certified units/sales
Australia (ARIA)	Gold	35,000^{‡}
Brazil (Pro-Música Brasil)	2× Platinum	80,000^{‡}
Canada (Music Canada)	Gold	40,000^{‡}
Denmark (IFPI Danmark)	Platinum	20,000^{‡}
France (SNEP)	Gold	50,000^{‡}
New Zealand (RMNZ)	4× Platinum	60,000^{‡}
Poland (ZPAV)	Gold	10,000^{‡}
United Kingdom (BPI)	Gold	100,000^{‡}
United States (RIAA)	3× Platinum	3,000,000^{‡}
^{‡} Sales+streaming figures based on certification alone.
