= Heat (Chris Brown song) =

Single by Chris Brown featuring Gunna

from the album Indigo
- Released: August 27, 2019
- Genre: R&B; trap
- Length: 4:22
- Label: RCA
- Songwriters: Christopher Brown; Sergio Kitchens; Tyron Douglas; Aaron Lamont; Mark Pitts
- Producer: Buddah Bless

Chris Brown singles chronology
"Blow My Mind" (2019)	"Heat" (2019)	"Did You?" (2019)

Gunna singles chronology
"Speed It Up" (2019)	"Heat" (2019)	"On Time" (2019)

Music video
- "Heat" on YouTube

"Heat" is a song by American singer Chris Brown featuring American rapper Gunna. It was released digitally on June 20, 2019, as a promotional single from Brown's ninth studio album, Indigo (2019). "Heat" was then released as the album's fifth official single on August 27, 2019.

"Heat" is an R&B and trap song with lyrics mixing themes of luxury and lust. The song peaked at number 36 on the US Billboard Hot 100 chart, and topped the Rhythmic Airplay chart, unseating Brown's previous single, "No Guidance", at the top spot. The song was certified quadruple platinum by the Recording Industry Association of America (RIAA).

The music video for "Heat" was released on August 30, 2019, and was directed by Brown and Edgar Esteves. The video features Brown and Gunna as retail associates at a high-end clothing designer's shop, and was praised for its visuals and choreographies.

== Background and release ==
"Heat" was unexpectedly teased one day before its release on Chris Brown's Instagram account. The song was released on June 20, 2019, as a promotional single from Brown's ninth studio album, Indigo, and then sent to mainstream urban radio as the album's fifth single on August 27, 2019.

== Composition ==
"Heat" is a mid-tempo R&B song, produced by American record producer Buddah Bless. The lyrics blend themes of luxury and lust, combining high-fashion and sex appeal. Brown makes use of the lingo "drip", which is a term to describe good-looking outfits. Its instrumental was described as "a sleek, minimalist beat characterized by its steady bassline, shimmering synths, and crisp percussion", while the artists provide "smooth vocal delivery" suggesting "a laid-back yet seductive vibe". "Heat"'s musicality blends the stylistic of R&B music with strong trap influences. The chorus speaks to a female character and reveals her and Brown’s sexual intentions.

== Critical reception ==
Urban Islandz commended both artists' performances on the track, stating "Chris Brown as usual graces the beat with smooth vocals and impeccable melodic runs. Gunna‘s performance did not disappoint either as he gave us the perfect second verse to complement Breezy’s flow and storyline." P.M. News called it a "captivating" track. Billboard described "Heat" as a "four-minute braggadocious ballad". Vibe praised Gunna's "hard-hitting yet fluent lyrics".

== Music video ==
The image shows Brown dancing in a display case, while several girls are motionless observing him.

The music video for "Heat" was released on August 30, 2019, and was directed by Brown and Edgar Esteves. The music video features Brown and Gunna as retail associates at a high-end clothing designer's shop called ‘Indigo’, where an eager line of women are clamoring to shop for clothes. Brown and Gunna assist them with apparel, ending up in a sexual situation, alternating scenes where Brown and his dancing crew are executing complex choreographies. According to The List, the "sentiments of lust and luxury are amplified in the video, with its stark color palette of mostly black, white, and silver, with blazes of hot pink and red". The video's choreography features some Kappa Alpha Psi and Phi Beta Sigma dance moves.

=== Critical reception ===
Billboard commented that "Brown’s typically fluid choreography juxtaposes the perfectly lined up silhouette of the ladies, a visual reminiscent of a Kanye West fashion show". The List commented that "The clean lines, and bright lights evoke fashion week as much as a car show, especially when the women are all dressed up and standing in a grid that Brown and Gunna move through, admiring the display. Urban Islandz praised Brown's acting in the video, and its "incredible choreography". Rated R&B described the video as "cinematic", and complimented the "slick dance moves" The Source said that Brown in the video "is seen perfectly coiffed dressed to the nines as he stepped right out of GQ". Rap-Up called it a "stylish" video, praising Brown's footwork.

== Accolades ==
Accolades for "Heat"
Year	Ceremony	Award	Result	Ref.
2021	ASCAP Pop Music Awards	Most Performed Songs	Won	
2021	ASCAP Rhythm & Soul Awards	Award-Winning R&B/Hip-Hop & Rap Songs	Won	
2021	BMI R&B/Hip-Hop Awards	Most Performed R&B/Hip-Hop Songs	Won	
2021	iHeartRadio Music Awards	R&B Song of the Year	Nominated	

== Chart performance ==
"Heat" debuted at number 77 on the US Billboard Hot 100 chart, on the week of September 14, 2019. After climbing the chart for ten weeks, the song eventually peaked at number 36 on the chart. "Heat" also topped the US Rhythmic Airplay chart. This became Brown's 11th number one on the chart, and his second during 2019, having previously logged four non-consecutive weeks in the top spot in 2019 with "No Guidance". "Heat" moved Brown up to fourth-equal on the list of artists with most number-one songs on the chart. This also became Gunna's first number one on the chart.

== Personnel ==
Credits adapted from the album's liner notes.

- Chris Brown – lead vocals
- Gunna – featured vocals
- Buddah Bless – production
- Patrizio Pigliapoco – recording, mixing engineer, mastering engineer, vocal engineer

== Charts ==
=== Weekly charts ===
Weekly chart performance for "Heat"
Chart (2019)	Peak position
US Billboard Hot 100	36
US Hot R&B/Hip-Hop Songs (Billboard)	15
US R&B/Hip-Hop Airplay (Billboard)	3
US Rhythmic Airplay (Billboard)	1
US Rolling Stone Top 100	76

=== Year-end charts ===
2019 year-end chart performance for "Heat"
Chart (2019)	Position
US Hot R&B/Hip-Hop Songs (Billboard)	83

2020 year-end chart performance for "Heat"
Chart (2020)	Position
US Hot R&B/Hip-Hop Songs (Billboard)	71
US Rhythmic (Billboard)	49

== Certifications ==
Certifications for "Heat "
Region	Certification	Certified units/sales
New Zealand (RMNZ)	Platinum	30,000^{‡}
United Kingdom (BPI)	Silver	200,000^{‡}
United States (RIAA)	4× Platinum	4,000,000^{‡}
^{‡} Sales+streaming figures based on certification alone.

== Release history ==
Country	Date	Format	Label
Various	June 20, 2019	Digital download	RCA
United States	August 27, 2019	Mainstream urban radio	RCA
