= Come Together (Chris Brown song) =

Song by Chris Brown featuring H.E.R.

from the album Indigo
- Studio: Calabasas Sound, Los Angeles
- Length: 3:54
- Label: RCA; CBE
- Songwriter(s): Chris Brown; Gabi Wilson
- Producer(s): Cardiak; Hitmaka; EVO; Isaac Wriston

Audio video
- "Come Together" on YouTube

"Come Together" is a song by American singer Chris Brown featuring vocals from R&B singer H.E.R., taken from his ninth studio album Indigo (2019). The song was certified gold by the Recording Industry Association of America (RIAA).

== Charts ==
Chart performance for "Come Together"
Chart (2019)	Peak position
New Zealand Hot Singles (RMNZ)	6
US Bubbling Under R&B/Hip-Hop Singles (Billboard)	1
US Hot R&B Songs (Billboard)	15

== Certifications ==
Certifications for "Come Together"
Region	Certification	Certified units/sales
New Zealand (RMNZ)	Gold	15,000^{‡}
United States (RIAA)	Gold	500,000^{‡}
^{‡} Sales+streaming figures based on certification alone.
