= This Is New York =

2023 single by ScarLip

Single by ScarLip
- Released: April 10, 2023
- Genre: East Coast hip hop; hardcore hip hop; drill
- Length: 2:17
- Label: Broken Child; Epic
- Songwriter: Sierra Lucas
- Producer: NY Bangers

ScarLip singles chronology
"Glizzy Gobbler" (2022)	"This Is New York" (2023)	"No Statements" (2023)

Music video
- "This Is New York" on YouTube
- "This Is Cali" on YouTube

Alternate cover

"This Is New York" is a song by American rapper ScarLip, released in April 2023. Considered her breakout hit, it gained popularity on the video-sharing app TikTok.

== Background ==
In an interview with Complex, ScarLip spoke about her inspiration behind the song:

Yo son, I'll make up mad music. And then I was just like, "Yo, I have always been inspired by DMX." So I'm like, "Yo, I need to bring some hard shit to the table." I was like, I ain't tap into that lately. And then I was just already mad because I'm like, "His niggas just doing boss shit and shit like that." So I was just like, God got in the booth, I was just like, "Something make me want to tell a nigga, back the fuck up." Something just make me want to grab a nigga up. And that's what I do to niggas. I grab their little ass up. So I had to let these niggas know, they always in your face playing with you, "Back the fuck up." And then I started talking that shit, "This is New York," 'cause that's where I'm from.

The song was originally released on April 2, 2023. It was subsequently released to streaming services twice, on April 10 and April 11, 2023.

== Composition and lyrics ==
The production of the song combines boom bap and drill elements and uses a "stomping, warped bassline", over which ScarLip raps in a raspy voice and aggressive and threatening manner, directing at anyone who brings trouble to her. She also delivers tongue-in-cheek lines such as "This is New York, fuck I look like tellin' a nigga good morning?" In the hook, she tells others to "back the fuck up".

== Release and promotion ==
The song began to gain traction across Twitter, Instagram and TikTok upon release, leading to ScarLip receiving cosigns from rappers including Cardi B. Rapper Busta Rhymes collaborated with ScarLip for a remix to the song, which they teased on social media.

== Music video ==
The music video was directed by WhoTheWizz. It sees ScarLip mobbing in different places in Harlem, including on Frederick Douglass Boulevard and the nearby St. Nicholas Houses.

== Remix ==
On May 11, 2023, ScarLip revealed a DM exchange with rapper Snoop Dogg on Instagram, in which he agreed to collaborate with her on a remix to "This Is New York". The official remix, featuring Snoop Dogg and released on May 18, 2023, is titled "This is Cali".
