= Call Me Every Day =

Single by Chris Brown featuring Wizkid

from the album Breezy
- Released: June 17, 2022
- Recorded: 2021–22
- Genre: Afro-fusion
- Length: 2:29
- Label: RCA; CBE
- Songwriters: Chris Brown; Ayodeji Balogun; Thierry Augustin Lohier
- Producers: Blaise Beatz; DJ Tunez; RoccStar

Chris Brown singles chronology
"Monalisa (Remix)" (2022)	"Call Me Every Day" (2022)	"Under the Influence" (2022)

Wizkid singles chronology
"Mood" (2022)	"Call Me Every Day" (2022)	"Majo" (2022)

Music video
- "Call Me Every Day" on YouTube

"Call Me Every Day" is a duet by American singer Chris Brown and Nigerian singer Wizkid, released by RCA Records as the third official single from Brown's tenth studio album, Breezy, on June 17, 2022.

== Background and release ==
Brown and WizKid had previously collaborated on two songs: the 2016 remix of the song "Shabba", also featuring R&B singer Trey Songz and rapper French Montana, and the single "African Bad Gyal", contained in WizKid's 2017 album Sounds from the Other Side. In November 2021, Brown made an appearance on Wizkid's "Made in Lagos tour", performing his song "Go Crazy" in London, marking his first performance in the UK in 11 years, following the revocation of his ban from entering the country implemented in 2010. In June 2022, during an interview with radio host Big Boy, Brown said that he and WizKid share a longtime friendship relationship outside of music, and that they previously did various studio sessions together where he felt like they ended up doing "fun songs", but with "Call Me Every Day" he accomplished his desire of making a "real record" with the Nigerian artist.

On June 10, 2022, Brown posted a snippet of "Call Me Every Day" on his Instagram account, in a video showing him and his dancing crew executing a choreography for the song, using moves created by Jamaican dancehall dancers. The track was released seven days later as the album's official third single.

== Composition ==
"Call Me Every Day" is a mid-tempo Afrobeats song. The singers trade their vocals on the song's verses and choruses, with Brown starting his first part singing “Girl, I love you, plus I’ll never make you minus / If I let you smoke, is you gon’ lose my lighter? / If you paranoid, then I’ma spend the night”. According to Rap-Up magazine, the song's instrumental is characterized by Afrobeats rhythm and a saxophone outro.

== Music video ==
The music video for the song, directed by Child, was released on August 24, 2022 through Brown's YouTube channel.

== Critical reception ==
The song received critical praise with several music journalists hailing the production. HotNewHipHop praised the track's musicality, writing that the single offers Wizkid's "smooth" soundscape. Rap-Up defined "Call Me Every Day" as an "infectious" and "groovy" track. HipHop-N-More commended the song's "solid production". Carl Lamarre of Billboard highlighted the track as a standout on Breezy.

=== Accolades ===
Awards and nominations for "Call Me Every Day"
Organization	Year	Category	Result	Ref.
African Entertainment Awards USA	2022	Best Collaboration	Nominated	
Soul Train Music Awards	2022	Best Collaboration	Nominated	
Soul Train Music Awards	2022	Best Dance Performance	Nominated	
NAACP Image Awards	2023	Outstanding Duo, Group or Collaboration (Contemporary)	Won	
BET Awards	2023	Best Collaboration	Nominated	

== Charts ==
Chart performance for "Call Me Every Day"
Chart (2022)	Peak position
Global 200 (Billboard)	103
New Zealand Hot Singles (RMNZ)	10
Nigeria (TurnTable Top 100)	12
South Africa Streaming (TOSAC)	16
UK Singles (Official Charts)	53
UK Hip Hop/R&B (Official Charts)	18
US Billboard Hot 100	76
US Adult R&B Songs (Billboard)	27
US Hot R&B/Hip-Hop Songs (Billboard)	20
US R&B/Hip-Hop Airplay (Billboard)	11
US World Digital Song Sales (Billboard)	6

== Certifications ==
Certifications for "Call Me Every Day"
Region	Certification	Certified units/sales
Canada (Music Canada)	Platinum	80,000^{‡}
New Zealand (RMNZ)	Platinum	30,000^{‡}
Nigeria (TCSN)	Gold	50,000^{‡}
Switzerland (IFPI Switzerland)	Gold	10,000^{‡}
United Kingdom (BPI)	Silver	200,000^{‡}
United States (RIAA)	Platinum	1,000,000^{‡}
^{‡} Sales+streaming figures based on certification alone.

== Release history ==
Release dates and formats for "Call Me Every Day"
Region	Date	Format(s)	Label	Ref.
Various	June 17, 2022	Digital download; streaming	RCA; CBE	
United States	September 20, 2022	Urban contemporary radio	RCA; CBE	
