= Magnolia Shorty =

American rapper (1982–2010)

Background information
- Also known as: Magnolia $horty
- Born: Renetta Yemika Lowe; September 30, 1982; Baton Rouge, Louisiana, U.S.
- Died: December 20, 2010 (aged 28) Little Woods, New Orleans, Louisiana, U.S.
- Genre: Hip hop (New Orleans bounce music)
- Occupations: Rapper
- Instruments: Vocals
- Years active: 1994–2010
- Label: Cash Money

Renetta Yemika Lowe-Bridgewater (September 30, 1982 – December 20, 2010), known by the stage name Magnolia Shorty, was an American rapper in the New Orleans–based bounce music scene.

== Music career ==
Magnolia Shorty and Ms. Tee (Trishell Williams) were the first women signed to Cash Money Records. Her 1997 debut album Monkey on the D$ck (often stylized Monkey On Tha D$ck) is considered a bounce classic, and she "was already considered a legend of bounce music" at the time of her death. Offbeat said the album exemplifies "the eccentric New Orleans elements of sexuality, comedy and hard edged dance rhythms." In his 2007 book Triksta, Nik Cohn credits Magnolia Shorty with his own discovery of bounce, and the third chapter of that book is named after her debut album. She was sampled on Fort Worth, Texas rapper Bone's hit “Homegurl” as well as "In My Feelings" by Drake and "Wobble Up" by Chris Brown.

Magnolia Shorty was discovered by Birdman. She received her nickname from Soulja Slim, also known as Magnolia Slim, because both had grown up in New Orleans' dangerous Magnolia Projects. Nicknamed "Queen of Bounce," she collaborated with many Cash Money artists beginning in the 1990s, including Juvenile and Hot Boys. She was first featured on Juvenile's 1997 song "3rd Ward Solja." In 2009 she appeared at the SXSW music festival and won Best Bounce Song at the Underground Hip-Hop Awards in New Orleans. She was a member of Lil Wayne's Cash Money crew in the early 1990s, and she was collaborating as well as working on her second album on the Cash Money/Young Money label in 2010.

== Death ==
On December 20, 2010, Magnolia was going back to her apartment to get something before heading to Miami, Florida to perform at a bounce-type genre festival. When she pulled in through the gate, another car came in behind her car and circled around her and blocked her in. Two men got out of the car and started shooting through the windows. She was hit with 26 bullets and was killed in the car with Jerome Hampton in a double homicide in the parking lot of the gated apartment complex where she lived, called the Georgetown of New Orleans, in the New Orleans East neighborhood of Edgelake. Police described the crime as a drive-by shooting. Her funeral was held on December 30, 2010, at the Fifth African Baptist Church in her hometown of New Orleans. Lil Wayne, B.G., Juvenile, Mack Maine and Birdman were among the more than 100 mourners at the funeral. She was buried at Mount Olivet Cemetery in New Orleans. On November 18, 2011, Magnolia's widower, Carl Bridgewater (31), was shot dead. He had recently gotten out of prison and lived with his pregnant girlfriend.

=== Murder investigation and trial ===
In August 2014, an Orleans Parish grand jury indicted four suspected gang members on murder charges in the slaying of New Orleans rapper Magnolia Shorty and a rival gang member. The indictment came as a result of a federal investigation by the New Orleans FBI's Gang Task Force. On February 22, 2017, the jury in the federal trial of ten men accused of being part of the "39ers" gang found all ten guilty of a racketeering charge. At least seven of the defendants were found guilty of conspiracy to use firearms to further drug trafficking crimes and crimes of violence. Two of the defendants, McCoy "Rat" Walker and Terrioues "T-Red" Owney, were found guilty of the murder.

== See also ==
- List of murdered hip hop musicians
