= Iffy (song) =

2022 single by Chris Brown

Single by Chris Brown

from the album Breezy
- Released: January 14, 2022
- Genre: R&B; bounce; trap
- Length: 2:53
- Label: RCA; CBE
- Songwriters: Chris Brown; Eric Bellinger; Michael "PopGod" Jiminez
- Producers: OG Parker; Smash David; Blaq Tuxedo

Chris Brown singles chronology
"Goodbye" (2021)	"Iffy" (2022)	"WE (Warm Embrace)" (2022)

Music video
- "Iffy" on YouTube

"Iffy" is a song by American singer Chris Brown, released by RCA Records as the lead single from his tenth studio album Breezy on January 14, 2022.

== Background ==
On the first day of 2022, Brown announced that "Iffy" would be released as the lead single from his upcoming tenth studio album Breezy, posting a teaser clip on Instagram with the caption "Breezy Season Coming! 2022 New Era Unlocked". The song ended up being included as the album's bonus track on the standard edition.

== Content ==
According to British radio station Capital Xtra, lyrically the song has Brown "discussing cars, jewellery, and other lavish items". The song contains an interpolation of 50 Cent’s 2003 hit song "In da Club".

== Music video ==
An accompanying music video was released on January 14, 2022, and directed by Joseph Kahn. The video was described by Trent Clark of HipHopDX as taking place in a "Fast & Furious–type drag racing underworld".

== Charts ==
=== Weekly charts ===
Weekly chart performance for "Iffy"
Chart (2022)	Peak position
Global 200 (Billboard)	148
South Africa Streaming (TOSAC)	73
UK Singles (Official Charts)	75
UK Hip Hop/R&B (Official Charts)	38
US Billboard Hot 100	71
US Hot R&B/Hip-Hop Songs (Billboard)	25
US R&B/Hip-Hop Airplay (Billboard)	12
US Rhythmic Airplay (Billboard)	3

=== Year-end charts ===
2022 year-end chart performance for "Iffy"
Chart (2022)	Position
US Hot R&B/Hip-Hop Songs (Billboard)	94
US Rhythmic (Billboard)	26

== Release history ==
"Iffy" release history
Region	Date	Format(s)	Label(s)	Ref.
United States	January 18, 2022	Rhythmic contemporary radio	RCA	
United States	January 18, 2022	Urban contemporary radio	RCA	
