= ScarLip =

American rapper

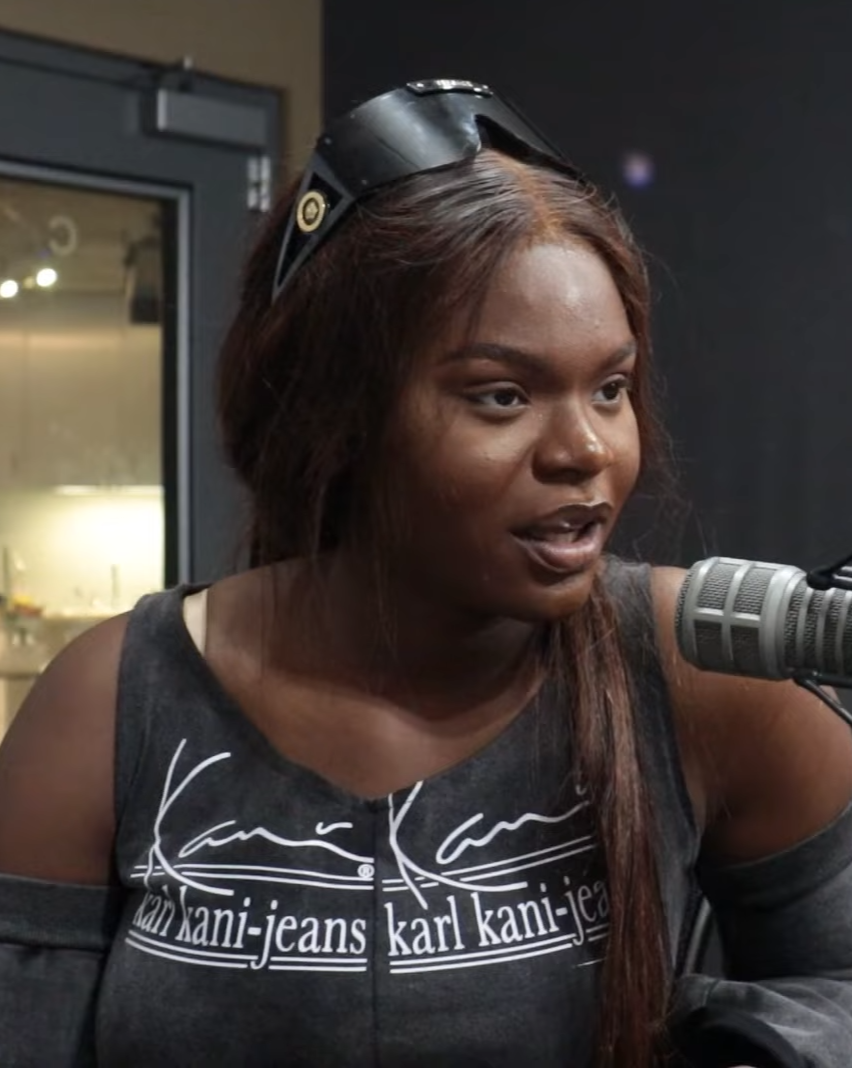
- ScarLip in 2023

Background information
- Also known as: Scar Lip
- Born: Sierra Lucas; December 12, 2000 (age 25); Bronx, New York City, U.S.
- Origin: Brooklyn, New York City, U.S.
- Genres: New York hip hop; drill rap
- Occupation: Rapper
- Years active: 2018–present
- Labels: Broken Child; Epic Records

Sierra Lucas (born December 12, 2000), known professionally as ScarLip (also known as Scar Lip), is an American rapper. Her 2022 single "Glizzy Gobbler" went viral on TikTok and she signed a distribution deal with Epic Records the following year after releasing her breakout single "This is New York".

== Life and career ==
Sierra Lucas was born on December 12, 2000, at the Bronx-Lebanon Hospital Center in Bronx, New York City and raised in Brooklyn, New York City. She began writing poetry from a young age. At age 12, her mother died after getting into a hit and run car accident. At age 16, she got a scar on her lip after her brother punched her in the mouth while she tried to enter her house; the scar later became the basis for her stage name. According to Lucas, her aunt and uncle abused her while she was living with them. She was eventually kicked out of her aunt's house and put into foster care, which led to her often moving between foster homes and detention centers in places such as Wilkes-Barre, Pennsylvania and Coney Island. She attended G.A.R Memorial Junior Senior High School located in Wilkes-Barre, Pennsylvania. During this time she moved frequently. She was first inspired to pursue music by her admiration for rapper DMX and posted her first rap video online in 2018, which went viral online the following year. Her first three songs, "Therapy", "Suicide Awareness", and "Foster Care", were recorded from 2019 to 2020.

ScarLip first gained popularity with her 2022 single "Glizzy Gobbler", which went viral on TikTok as a meme. Her single "This is New York" was produced by NY Bangers and was released in April 2023, the same month that she was featured on the Swizz Beatz, Jadakiss, and Benny the Butcher song "Take 'Em Out" from Swizz Beatz's extended play (EP) Hip Hop 50: Vol. 2. "This is New York" became popular on TikTok and soon became her breakout hit, while a remix featuring Snoop Dogg titled "This is Cali" was released in May 2023. She was signed to Epic Records in June 2023. On September 15, 2023, ScarLip released her single "No Statements", which became her first song to reach the Billboard chart, debuting at number 40 on Mainstream R&B/Hip-Hop Airplay and peaking at number 23. ScarLip's upcoming debut EP, Scars & Stripes, will be produced entirely by Swizz Beatz.

== Musical style ==
ScarLip's music is primarily New York hip hop and gangsta rap. She has listed DMX, Raekwon, the hip hop group Onyx, and rapper Cardi B as influences on her music and described her sound as "hardcore aggression".

== Discography ==
Extended plays

- Scars & Stripes (TBA)

=== Singles ===
==== As lead artist ====
List of singles, with year released and album name shown
Title	Year	Album
"Therapy"	2019	Non-album singles
"Foster Care"	2019	Non-album singles
"Suicide Awareness"	2020	Non-album singles
"Loose Control"	2020	Non-album singles
"Solus"	2021	Non-album singles
"Glizzy Gobbler"	2022	Non-album singles
"This is New York"	2023	Non-album singles
"No Statements"	2023	Non-album singles
"Blick" (solo or remix featuring NLE Choppa)	2024	Non-album singles
"Have You Seen My Boyfriend" (featuring Zeddy Will)	2024	Non-album singles
"She's Hot"	2024	Non-album singles

==== As featured artist ====
List of singles, with year released and album name shown
Title	Year	Album
"Take 'Em Out" (Swizz Beatz, Jadakiss, and Benny the Butcher featuring Scar Lip)	2023	Hip Hop 50: Vol. 2
