= Psychic (song) =

Song by Chris Brown featuring Jack Harlow

from the album Breezy
- Released: June 24, 2022
- Studio: Calabasas Sound, Los Angeles
- Genre: R&B; trap
- Length: 3:40
- Label: RCA; CBE
- Songwriters: Chris Brown; Jackman Thomas Harlow; HoodyBaby
- Producers: Albi; Preme; DeeJayM0; Nick Cassidy

Music video
- "Psychic" on YouTube

"Psychic" is a song by American singer Chris Brown, taken from his tenth studio album Breezy (2022). The song features vocals from American rapper Jack Harlow.

== Development and composition ==
"Psychic" was written by Brown, Harlow and rapper HoodyBaby, and produced by Albi, Preme, DeeJayM0 and Nick Cassidy. Musically, "Psychic" is a trap-driven R&B song. The track's instrumental contains a sample from the 2006 single "Me & U" by Cassie. "Psychic" marks the second collaboration between Brown and Harlow following 2020's "Already Best Friends".

== Music video ==
The music video for "Psychic" was directed by Cameron Dean, executive produced by Shayna Gianelli, and released on February 20, 2023. It features Brown and his dancing crew executing complex choreographies in numerous scenarios, taking place in a futuristic city. The video also has scenes showcasing Brown dancing along with singer Cassie, who also previously appeared in the former's 2009 "Crawl" music video.

== Commercial performance ==
Despite not being released as a single, “Psychic” peaked at number 4 on the NZ Hot Singles Chart, 21 on the Hot R&B/Hip-Hop Songs chart, 52 in Australia, 64 in the UK, 78 on the Billboard Hot 100 chart, and 85 in Canada.

== Charts ==
Chart performance for "Psychic"
Chart (2022)	Peak position
Australia (ARIA)	52
Canada Hot 100 (Billboard)	85
Global 200 (Billboard)	122
New Zealand Hot Singles (RMNZ)	4
South Africa Streaming (TOSAC)	41
UK Singles (OCC)	64
UK Hip Hop/R&B (OCC)	21
US Billboard Hot 100	78
US Hot R&B/Hip-Hop Songs (Billboard)	21

== Certifications ==
Certifications for "Psychic"
Region	Certification	Certified units/sales
New Zealand (RMNZ)	Gold	15,000^{‡}
^{‡} Sales+streaming figures based on certification alone.
