= Undecided (Chris Brown song) =

2019 song by Chris Brown

Single by Chris Brown

from the album Indigo
- Released: January 4, 2019
- Recorded: August 2018
- Studio: CBE (Tarzana, Los Angeles)
- Genre: R&B; pop
- Length: 3:08
- Label: RCA
- Songwriters: Chris Brown; Scott Storch; Vincent Van den Ende; Antonio Stith; Patrizio Pigliapoco; Felicia Ferraro; Jarvis Barker; Sylvester Jackson; Shanice Wilson-Knox; Narada Walden
- Lyricists: Chris Brown; Antonio Stith; Felicia Ferraro
- Producers: Scott Storch; Avedon (co-producer)

Chris Brown singles chronology
"Buss It" (2018)	"Undecided" (2019)	"Chi Chi" (2019)

Music video
- "Undecided" on YouTube

"Undecided" is a song by American singer Chris Brown. It was released as a single on January 4, 2019, by RCA Records. The song serves as the lead single from Brown's ninth studio album Indigo.

The song was written by Chris Brown, Felicia Ferraro and Antonio Stith, while its production was handled by Scott Storch and Avedon. "Undecided" is a midtempo R&B and pop song in which Brown reflects on his hesitation to fully commit to a woman.

The single was certified Platinum by the Recording Industry Association of America (RIAA), gold by the British Phonographic Industry (BPI) and Canadian Recording Industry Association (MC). The music video for "Undecided" was released alongside the song. It was filmed at Santa Monica Pier and stars Brown and American actress Serayah.

== Background and composition ==
According to Brown's mixing engineer Patrizio Pigliapoco, "Undecided" was recorded in August 2018, right after the end of the "Heartbreak on a Full Moon Tour", at Brown's home studio. It was the first song composed for the Indigo album following the creation of its concept. The song was written by Chris Brown, Antonio Stith and Felicia Ferraro, and produced by Scott Storch, who previously worked with Brown on his singles "Run It!" (2005) and "Gimme That" (2006), as well as on his albums Exclusive (2007) and Heartbreak on a Full Moon (2017).

"Undecided" is a "melodic" midtempo R&B and pop song, with a "mellow, tropical-leaning" instrumental. The song runs for three minutes and eight seconds, containing a sample of American R&B singer Shanice's 1991 single "I Love Your Smile". ThisisRnB described it as a "sweet-sounding" song with romantic content. Lyrically, "Undecided" finds Brown reflecting on his hesitation to fully commit to a woman, realizing that he loves her too much to not do so.

== Critical reception ==
Vibe praised "Undecided" and ranked it seventh best R&B song of 2019. HotNewHipHop defined it "a love song that shows off all of the notes Brown is famous for hitting".

== Music video ==
On January 4, 2019, Brown uploaded the music video for "Undecided" on his YouTube account. The music video was directed by Chris Brown and Arrad, and features Serayah as Brown's love interest.

=== Synopsis ===
The video opens with Brown trespassing onto the Santa Monica Pier at night. He spots a girl, played by Serayah, through a magical portal created by the thread of a blue balloon. Brown enters the portal and a magical dream sequence unfolds, with the couple riding the roller coaster, playing carnival games, and dancing under an indigo starry sky, decorated with a giant full moon, as the ocean’s waves crash on the shore, before ending the magical dream sequence with a kiss. The video ends with Brown suddenly returning to reality, running away from the magic balloon.

=== Reception ===
Rap-Up praised the video for being "dance-heavy" and "cinematic". HypeBeast stated that in the video "the two showcase their dance moves alongside their respective crews throughout a bright and lively carnival". Urban Islandz commented that "the fun-filled music video comes with the exact creative energy that Chris Brown is known for".

== Commercial performance ==
"Undecided" debuted at number 35 on the US Billboard Hot 100, serving as the singer's 91st entry on the chart. With the song, Chris Brown tied James Brown's eighth most Hot 100 entries of all-time. "Undecided" marked his first Hot 100 entry since "Freaky Friday" with Lil Dicky in April 2018, which peaked at number eight.

== Charts ==
=== Weekly charts ===
Weekly chart performance for "Undecided"
Chart (2019)	Peak position
Australia (ARIA)	58
Belgium (Ultratip Bubbling Under Flanders)	29
Belgium (Ultratip Bubbling Under Wallonia)	20
Canada Hot 100 (Billboard)	57
France (SNEP)	150
Germany (GfK)	94
Ireland (IRMA)	46
Japan Hot 100 (Billboard)	92
Netherlands (Dutch Top 40 Tipparade)	7
Netherlands (Single Top 100)	43
New Zealand (Recorded Music NZ)	15
Scottish Singles Sales (Official Charts)	32
Sweden Heatseeker (Sverigetopplistan)	15
Switzerland (Schweizer Hitparade)	47
UK Singles (Official Charts)	15
UK Hip Hop/R&B (Official Charts)	6
US Billboard Hot 100	35
US Adult R&B Songs (Billboard)	4
US Hot R&B/Hip-Hop Songs (Billboard)	15
US R&B/Hip-Hop Airplay (Billboard)	4
US Rhythmic Airplay (Billboard)	10

=== Year-end charts ===
2019 year-end chart performance for "Undecided"
Chart (2019)	Position
US Hot R&B/Hip-Hop Songs (Billboard)	77

== Certifications ==
Certifications for "Undecided"
Region	Certification	Certified units/sales
Canada (Music Canada)	Gold	40,000^{‡}
New Zealand (RMNZ)	Platinum	30,000^{‡}
United Kingdom (BPI)	Gold	400,000^{‡}
United States (RIAA)	Platinum	1,000,000^{‡}
^{‡} Sales+streaming figures based on certification alone.

== Release history ==
Region	Date	Format	Label	Ref.
Various	January 4, 2019	Digital download; streaming	RCA	
