= List of awards and nominations received by Chris Brown =

Chris Brown awards and nominations
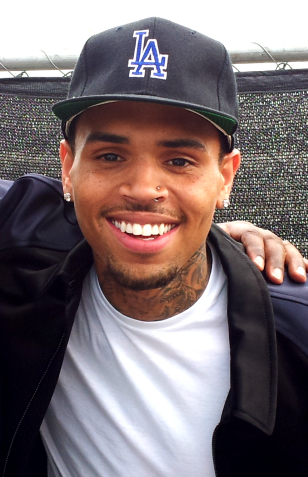
- Brown at BET Awards 2013
Awards and nominations
Award	Wins	Nominations
American Music Awards	5	25
BET Awards	21	65
BET Hip Hop Awards	4	10
Billboard Music Awards	5	40
Grammy Awards	2	28
iHeartRadio Music Awards	4	18
MOBO Awards	2	8
MTV Video Music Awards	3	23
MuchMusic Video Awards	0	4
NAACP Image Awards	12	28
Nickelodeon Kids' Choice Awards	1	2
People's Choice Awards	2	9
Soul Train Music Awards	14	61
Teen Choice Awards	7	23

Totals (Note: Certain award groups do not simply award one winner. They acknowledge several different recipients, have runners-up, and have third place. Since this is a specific recognition and is different from losing an award, runner-up mentions are considered wins in this award tally. For simplification and to avoid errors, each award in this list has been presumed to have had a prior nomination.)
- Wins: 224
- Nominations: 578

Chris Brown is an American R&B singer-songwriter and actor. In 2006, Chris Brown received thirty-seven nominations and won eleven, including Viewer's Choice for "Yo (Excuse Me Miss)" at the BET Awards; Male Artist of the Year, New Artist of the Year and Artist of the Year at the Billboard Music Awards; Outstanding New Artist at the NAACP Image Awards, Choice Breakout Male at the Teen Choice Awards; Best R&B/Soul New Artist at the Soul Train Music Awards; Fake ID Award at the TRL Awards; Best R&B Video for "Run It!" at the MTV Australia Awards.

In 2007, he received fourteen nominations and won two. In 2008, Brown has received fifty nominations and won nineteen, including Favorite Pop/Rock Male Artist, Favorite Soul/R&B Male Artist and Artist of the Year at the American Music Awards; Best Male R&B Artist at the BET Awards; Best Heartbreak Video for "No Air" at the BET Pre-Awards; Best International Act and Best R&B/Soul at the MOBO Awards; Best Male Video for "With You" at the MTV Video Music Awards; Outstanding Male Artist at the NAACP Image Awards; Favorite Male Singer at the Nickelodeon Kids' Choice Awards; Best R&B Artist at the Ozone Awards; Choice Music Hookup for "No Air", Choice Music: Male Artist, Choice Music: R&B Artist, Choice Music: R&B Track for "Forever" and Choice Music: Rap/Hip Hop Track for "Shawty Get Loose" at the Teen Choice Awards. In 2010, he won the AOL Fandemonium Award at the BET Awards.

== African Entertainment Awards ==
The African Entertainment Awards is an annual awards ceremony established in 2015. Brown has won two awards from 9 nominations.

Year	Nominee / work	Award	Result
2020	"Blow My Mind" (with Davido)	Best Collaboration	Nominated
2022	"Call Me Every Day" (with Wizkid)	Best Collaboration	Nominated
2022	"Monalisa (Remix)" (with Lojay & Sarz)	Best Collaboration	Nominated
2022	"Monalisa (Remix)" (with Lojay & Sarz)	Song of the Year	Nominated
2022	Chris Brown	International Artist of the Year	Nominated
2023	Chris Brown	International Artist of the Year	Won
2024	"Hmmm" (with Davido)	Best Collaboration	Nominated
2024	Chris Brown	International Artist of the Year	Won
2024	Chris Brown	Best Afro-fusion Artist	Won

== African Arts Entertainment Awards ==
The East Africa Arts Entertainment Awards (EAEA) recognize outstanding achievements in East African arts and entertainment.

Year	Nominee / work	Award	Result
2025	"Hmmm" (with Davido)	Best International/Global Collaboration	Won

== American Music Awards ==
The American Music Awards is an annual awards ceremony created by Dick Clark in 1973. Brown has won five awards from twenty-five nominations.

Year	Nominee / work	Award	Result
2006	Chris Brown	Favorite Soul/R&B Male Artist	Nominated
2008	Chris Brown	Artist of the Year	Won
2008	Chris Brown	Favorite Pop/Rock Male Artist	Won
2008	Chris Brown	Favorite Soul/R&B Male Artist	Won
2010	Chris Brown	Favorite Soul/R&B Male Artist	Nominated
2011	Chris Brown	Favorite Soul/R&B Male Artist	Nominated
2011	F.A.M.E.	Favorite Soul/R&B Album	Nominated
2012	Chris Brown	Favorite Soul/R&B Male Artist	Nominated
2012	Fortune	Favorite Soul/R&B Album	Nominated
2014	Chris Brown	Favorite Soul/R&B Male Artist	Nominated
2015	Chris Brown	Favorite Soul/R&B Male Artist	Nominated
2015	X	Favorite Soul/R&B Album	Nominated
2016	Chris Brown	Favorite Soul/R&B Male Artist	Won
2019	Chris Brown	Favorite Soul/R&B Male Artist	Nominated
2019	Indigo	Favorite Soul/R&B Album	Nominated
2020	Chris Brown	Favorite Soul/R&B Male Artist	Nominated
2020	"No Guidance" (with Drake)	Favorite Soul/R&B Song	Nominated
2021	Chris Brown	Favorite Soul/R&B Male Artist	Nominated
2021	"Go Crazy" (with Young Thug)	Collaboration of the Year	Nominated
2021	"Go Crazy" (with Young Thug)	Favorite Soul/R&B Song	Nominated
2022	Chris Brown	Favorite Soul/R&B Male Artist	Won
2025	Chris Brown	Favorite Soul/R&B Male Artist	Nominated
2025	"Residuals"	Favorite Soul/R&B Song	Nominated
2026	Chris Brown	Favorite Soul/R&B Male Artist	Nominated
2026	"It Depends" (with Bryson Tiller)	Favorite Soul/R&B Song	Nominated

== ARIA Music Awards ==
The ARIA Music Awards is an annual awards show from the Australian Recording Industry Association. Brown received one nomination.

Year	Nominee / work	Award	Result
2011	Chris Brown	Most Popular International Artist	Nominated

== ASCAP Awards ==
The ASCAP Awards are held annually by the American Society of Composers, Authors and Publishers.

=== ASCAP Latin Awards ===
Year	Nominee / work	Award	Result
2015	"Control" (with Wisin & Pitbull)	Pop Song of the Year	Won
2023	"Nostálgico" (with Rvssian & Rauw Alejandro)	Award-Winning Songs	Won

=== ASCAP Pop Awards ===
The ASCAP Pop Music Awards honors the songwriters and publishers of the most performed pop songs.

Year	Nominee / work	Award	Result
2007	"Run It!" (with Juelz Santana)	Most Performed Songs	Won
2008	"Say Goodbye"	Most Performed Songs	Won
2008	"Shortie Like Mine" (with Bow Wow & Johntá Austin)	Most Performed Songs	Won
2009	"With You"	Most Performed Songs	Won
2009	"No Air" (with Jordin Sparks)	Most Performed Songs	Won
2009	"Forever"	Most Performed Songs	Won
2013	"Don't Wake Me Up"	Most Performed Songs	Won
2016	"Post to Be" (with Omarion & Jhené Aiko)	Most Performed Songs	Won
2020	"No Guidance" (with Drake)	Most Performed Songs	Won
2021	"Go Crazy" (with Young Thug)	Most Performed Songs	Won
2021	"Heat" (with Gunna)	Most Performed Songs	Won
2024	"Under the Influence"	Most Performed Songs	Won
2026	"Residuals"	Most Performed Songs	Won

=== ASCAP Rhythm & Soul Awards ===
ASCAP honors its top members in a series of annual awards shows in seven different music categories: pop, rhythm and soul, film and television, Latin, country, Christian, and concert music.

Year	Nominee / work	Award	Result
2007	"Yo (Excuse Me Miss)"	Award-Winning R&B/Hip-Hop Songs	Won
2012	"Look at Me Now" (with Busta Rhymes & Lil Wayne)	Top Rap Song	Won
2012	"Look at Me Now" (with Busta Rhymes & Lil Wayne)	Award-Winning R&B/Hip-Hop Songs	Won
2012	"Make a Movie" (with Twista)	Award-Winning R&B/Hip-Hop Songs	Won
2012	"No Bullshit"	Award-Winning R&B/Hip-Hop Songs	Won
2012	"She Ain't You"	Award-Winning R&B/Hip-Hop Songs	Won
2012	"Wet the Bed"	Award-Winning R&B/Hip-Hop Songs	Won
2012	"My Last" (with Big Sean)	Award-Winning R&B/Hip-Hop Songs	Won
2012	"My Last" (with Big Sean)	Award-Winning Rap Songs	Won
2013	"Another Round" (with Fat Joe)	Award-Winning R&B/Hip-Hop Songs	Won
2013	"Birthday Cake" (with Rihanna)	Award-Winning R&B/Hip-Hop Songs	Won
2013	"Strip"	Award-Winning R&B/Hip-Hop Songs	Won
2013	"Take It to the Head" (with DJ Khaled, Rick Ross, Nicki Minaj & Lil Wayne)	Award-Winning R&B/Hip-Hop Songs	Won
2014	"Beat It" (with Sean Kingston & Wiz Khalifa)	Award-Winning R&B/Hip-Hop Songs	Won
2014	"Fine China"	Award-Winning R&B/Hip-Hop Songs	Won
2014	"Love More" (with Nicki Minaj)	Award-Winning R&B/Hip-Hop Songs	Won
2015	"Hold You Down" (with DJ Khaled, August Alsina, Future & Jeremih)	Award-Winning R&B/Hip-Hop Songs	Won
2015	"It Won't Stop" (Remix) (with Sevyn Streeter)	Award-Winning R&B/Hip-Hop Songs	Won
2015	"Love More" (with Nicki Minaj)	Award-Winning R&B/Hip-Hop Songs	Won
2015	"Main Chick" (with Kid Ink)	Award-Winning R&B/Hip-Hop Songs	Won
2015	"New Flame" (with Usher & Rick Ross)	Award-Winning R&B/Hip-Hop Songs	Won
2015	"Show Me" (with Kid Ink)	Award-Winning R&B/Hip-Hop Songs	Won
2015	"Show Me" (with Kid Ink)	Top Rap Song	Won
2015	"Main Chick" (with Kid Ink)	Award-Winning Rap Songs	Won
2016	"All Eyes On You" (with Meek Mill & Nicki Minaj)	Award-Winning R&B/Hip-Hop Songs	Won
2016	"Ayo" (with Tyga)	Award-Winning R&B/Hip-Hop Songs	Won
2016	"Hold You Down" (with DJ Khaled, August Alsina, Future & Jeremih)	Award-Winning R&B/Hip-Hop Songs	Won
2016	"How Many Times" (with DJ Khaled, Lil Wayne & Big Sean)	Award-Winning R&B/Hip-Hop Songs	Won
2016	"Liquor"	Award-Winning R&B/Hip-Hop Songs	Won
2016	"New Flame" (with Usher & Rick Ross)	Award-Winning R&B/Hip-Hop Songs	Won
2016	"Only" (with Nicki Minaj, Drake & Lil Wayne)	Award-Winning R&B/Hip-Hop Songs	Won
2016	"Post to Be" (with Omarion & Jhené Aiko)	Award-Winning R&B/Hip-Hop Songs	Won
2017	"Back to Sleep"	Award-Winning R&B/Hip-Hop Songs	Won
2017	"Play No Games" (with Big Sean & Ty Dolla $ign)	Award-Winning R&B/Hip-Hop Songs	Won
2018	"Party" (with Usher & Gucci Mane)	Award-Winning R&B/Hip-Hop Songs	Won
2018	"Privacy"	Award-Winning R&B/Hip-Hop Songs	Won
2018	"Whatever You Need" (with Meek Mill & Ty Dolla $ign)	Award-Winning R&B/Hip-Hop Songs	Won
2019	"Pills & Automobiles" (with Yo Gotti, A Boogie wit da Hoodie & Kodak Black)	Award-Winning R&B/Hip-Hop Songs	Won
2020	"No Guidance" (with Drake)	Award-Winning R&B/Hip-Hop Songs	Won
2020	"Undecided"	Award-Winning R&B/Hip-Hop Songs	Won
2021	"No Guidance" (with Drake)	Top R&B/Hip-Hip & Rap Song of the Year	Won
2021	"Heat" (with Gunna)	Award-Winning R&B/Hip-Hop & Rap Songs	Won
2021	"Go Crazy" (with Young Thug)	Award-Winning R&B/Hip-Hop & Rap Songs	Won
2022	"Go Crazy" (with Young Thug)	Top R&B/Hip-Hip & Rap Song of the Year	Won
2022	"Baddest" (with Yung Bleu & 2 Chainz)	Award-Winning R&B/Hip-Hop & Rap Songs	Won
2022	"Come Through" (with H.E.R.)	Award-Winning R&B/Hip-Hop & Rap Songs	Won
2023	"Under the Influence"	Award-Winning R&B/Hip-Hop & Rap Songs	Won
2024	"Superhero (Heroes & Villains)" (with Metro Boomin & Future )	Award-Winning R&B/Hip-Hop & Rap Songs	Won
2025	"IDGAF" (with Tee Grizzley & Mariah the Scientist)	Award-Winning R&B/Hip-Hop & Rap Songs	Won
2025	"Residuals"	Award-Winning R&B/Hip-Hop & Rap Songs	Won
2025	"Sensational" (with Davido & Lojay)	Award-Winning R&B/Hip-Hop & Rap Songs	Won
2026	"It Depends" (with Bryson Tiller)	Award-Winning R&B/Hip-Hop & Rap Songs	Won

== BET Awards ==
=== BET Awards ===
The BET Awards were established in 2001 by the Black Entertainment Television (BET) network to celebrate African Americans and other minorities in music, acting, sports, and other fields of entertainment. The awards are presented annually and broadcast live on BET. Brown has won 21 awards from 65 nominations.

Year	Nominee / work	Award	Result
2006	Chris Brown	Best New Artist	Won
2006	Chris Brown	Best Male R&B Artist	Nominated
2006	"Yo (Excuse Me Miss)"	Viewer's Choice	Won
2007	"Shortie Like Mine" (with Bow Wow & Johntá Austin)	Viewer's Choice	Nominated
2008	Chris Brown	Best Male R&B Artist	Won
2008	"Kiss Kiss" (with T-Pain)	Best Collaboration	Nominated
2008	"Kiss Kiss" (with T-Pain)	Viewer's Choice	Nominated
2008	"No Air" (with Jordin Sparks)	Viewer's Choice	Nominated
2010	Chris Brown	Best Male R&B Artist	Nominated
2010	Chris Brown	AOL Fandemonium Award	Won
2011	Chris Brown	Best Male R&B Artist	Won
2011	Chris Brown	Best Actor	Nominated
2011	Chris Brown	FANdemonium Award	Won
2011	"Look at Me Now" (with Busta Rhymes & Lil Wayne)	Video of the Year	Won
2011	"Look at Me Now" (with Busta Rhymes & Lil Wayne)	Best Collaboration	Won
2011	"Look at Me Now" (with Busta Rhymes & Lil Wayne)	Coca-Cola Viewer's Choice	Won
2011	"Deuces" (with Tyga & Kevin McCall)	Best Collaboration	Nominated
2012	Chris Brown	Best Male R&B Artist	Won
2012	Chris Brown	Video Director of the Year	Nominated
2012	Chris Brown	FANdemonium Award	Won
2012	"Turn Up the Music"	Coca-Cola Viewer's Choice	Nominated
2013	Chris Brown	Best Male R&B Artist	Nominated
2013	Chris Brown	FANdemonium Award	Won
2014	Chris Brown	Best Male R&B Artist	Nominated
2014	Chris Brown	Video Director of the Year	Nominated
2014	"Fine China"	Video of the Year	Nominated
2015	Chris Brown	Best Male R&B/Pop Artist	Won
2015	Chris Brown	Fandemonium Award	Won
2015	"Loyal" (with Lil Wayne & Tyga)	Video of the Year	Nominated
2015	"Loyal" (with Lil Wayne & Tyga)	Best Collaboration	Nominated
2015	"New Flame" (with Usher & Rick Ross)	Video of the Year	Nominated
2015	"New Flame" (with Usher & Rick Ross)	Best Collaboration	Nominated
2015	"Only" (with Nicki Minaj, Drake & Lil Wayne)	Coca-Cola Viewer's Choice Award	Won
2016	Chris Brown	Best Male R&B/Pop Artist	Nominated
2016	Chris Brown	Video Director of the Year	Nominated
2016	"Play No Games" (with Big Sean & Ty Dolla $ign)	Best Collaboration	Nominated
2016	"Back to Sleep"	Coca-Cola Viewer's Choice Award	Nominated
2017	Chris Brown	Best Male R&B/Pop Artist	Nominated
2017	"Party" (with Usher & Gucci Mane)	Best Collaboration	Nominated
2018	Chris Brown	Best Male R&B/Pop Artist	Nominated
2018	Chris Brown	Video Director of the Year	Nominated
2018	"Melanin Magic" (with Remy Ma)	BET Her Award	Nominated
2019	Chris Brown	Best Male R&B/Pop Artist	Nominated
2020	Chris Brown	Best Male R&B/Pop Artist	Won
2020	"No Guidance" (with Drake)	Video of the Year	Nominated
2020	"No Guidance" (with Drake)	Best Collaboration	Won
2020	"No Guidance" (with Drake)	Coca-Cola Viewer's Choice Award	Nominated
2021	Chris Brown	Best Male R&B/Pop Artist	Won
2021	Chris Brown & Young Thug	Best Group	Nominated
2021	"Go Crazy" (with Young Thug)	Video of the Year	Nominated
2021	"Go Crazy" (with Young Thug)	Coca-Cola Viewer's Choice Award	Nominated
2022	Chris Brown	Best Male R&B/Pop Artist	Nominated
2023	Chris Brown	Best Male R&B/Pop Artist	Won
2023	Breezy	Album of the Year	Nominated
2023	"WE (Warm Embrace)"	Video of the Year	Nominated
2023	"Call Me Every Day" (with Wizkid)	Best Collaboration	Nominated
2024	Chris Brown	Best Male R&B/Pop Artist	Nominated
2024	11:11	Album of the Year	Nominated
2024	"Sensational" (with Davido & Lojay)	Viewer's Choice Award	Nominated
2025	Chris Brown	Best Male R&B/Pop Artist	Won
2025	11:11 (Deluxe)	Album of the Year	Nominated
2025	"Residuals"	Viewer's Choice Award	Won
2026	Chris Brown	Best Male R&B/Pop Artist	Nominated
2026	"It Depends" (The Remix) (with Bryson Tiller & Usher)	Best Collaboration	Nominated
2026	"It Depends" (with Bryson Tiller)	Viewer's Choice Award	Nominated

=== BET Pre-Awards ===
The BET Pre-Awards were established in 2001 by the Black Entertainment Television network to celebrate African Americans and other minorities in music, acting, sports, and other fields of entertainment. These annually presented awards are presented before the BET Awards and broadcast live on BET. Brown has won one award.

Year	Nominee / work	Award	Result
2008	"No Air" (with Jordin Sparks)	Best Heartbreak Video	Won

=== BET Hip Hop Awards ===
The BET Hip Hop Awards are hosted annually by BET for hip hop performers, producers, and music video directors. Brown has been nominated ten times and won four awards.

Year	Nominee / work	Award	Result
2008	"Get Like Me" (with David Banner & Yung Joc)	Best Hip Hop Video	Nominated
2008	"Get Like Me" (with David Banner & Yung Joc)	Best Hip Hop Collaboration	Nominated
2011	"My Last" (with Big Sean)	Best Hip Hop Video	Nominated
2011	"Look at Me Now" (with Busta Rhymes & Lil Wayne)	Best Hip Hop Video	Won
2011	"Look at Me Now" (with Busta Rhymes & Lil Wayne)	Reese's Perfect Combo Award	Won
2011	"Look at Me Now" (with Busta Rhymes & Lil Wayne)	Verizon People's Champ Award	Won
2015	"Play No Games" (with Big Sean & Ty Dolla $ign)	Best Hip Hop Video	Nominated
2020	Chris Brown & Young Thug	Best Duo or Group	Won
2021	Chris Brown & Young Thug	Best Duo or Group	Nominated
2021	"Go Crazy" (with Young Thug)	Best Hip Hop Video	Nominated

== Billboard Awards ==
=== Billboard Music Awards ===
The Billboard Music Awards are sponsored by Billboard magazine and is held annually in December. The awards are based on sales data by Nielsen SoundScan and radio information by Nielsen Broadcast Data Systems. Brown has won five awards.

Year	Nominee / work	Award	Result
2006	Chris Brown	Artist of the Year	Won
2006	Chris Brown	New Artist of the Year	Won
2006	Chris Brown	Male Artist of the Year	Won
2006	Chris Brown	Male Hot 100 Artist of the Year	Nominated
2006	Chris Brown	Video Clips Artist of the Year	Nominated
2006	Chris Brown	New R&B/Hip-Hop Artist of the Year	Nominated
2006	Chris Brown	Male R&B/Hip-Hop Artist of the Year	Nominated
2006	Chris Brown	R&B/Hip-Hop Songs Artist of the Year	Nominated
2012	Chris Brown	Top Male Artist	Nominated
2012	Chris Brown	Top R&B Artist	Won
2012	F.A.M.E.	Top R&B Album	Nominated
2012	"She Ain't You"	Top R&B Song	Nominated
2013	Chris Brown	Top R&B Artist	Nominated
2013	Fortune	Top R&B Album	Nominated
2013	"Algo Me Gusta de Ti" (with Wisin & Yandel and T-Pain)	Top Latin Song	Nominated
2015	Chris Brown	Top R&B Artist	Nominated
2015	X	Top R&B Album	Nominated
2015	"Loyal" (with Lil Wayne, French Montana, Too Short & Tyga)	Top R&B Song	Nominated
2016	Chris Brown	Top R&B Artist	Nominated
2016	Royalty	Top R&B Album	Nominated
2016	"Post to Be" (with Omarion & Jhené Aiko)	Top R&B Song	Nominated
2018	Chris Brown	Top R&B Artist	Nominated
2019	"Freaky Friday" (with Lil Dicky)	Top R&B Song	Nominated
2020	Chris Brown	Top R&B Artist	Nominated
2020	Chris Brown	Top R&B Male Artist	Nominated
2020	Indigo	Top R&B Album	Nominated
2020	"No Guidance" (with Drake)	Top R&B Song	Nominated
2020	"No Guidance" (with Drake)	Top Collaboration	Nominated
2020	"No Guidance" (with Drake)	Top Streaming Song	Nominated
2021	Chris Brown	Top R&B Artist	Nominated
2021	Chris Brown	Top R&B Male Artist	Nominated
2021	Slime & B (with Young Thug)	Top R&B Album	Nominated
2021	"Go Crazy" (with Young Thug)	Top R&B Song	Nominated
2021	"Go Crazy" (with Young Thug)	Top Collaboration	Nominated
2021	"Go Crazy" (with Young Thug)	Top Hot 100 Song	Nominated
2021	"Go Crazy" (with Young Thug)	Top Radio Song	Nominated
2023	Chris Brown	Top R&B Artist	Nominated
2023	Chris Brown	Top R&B Male Artist	Nominated
2024	Chris Brown	Top R&B Touring Artist	Nominated
2024	11:11	Top R&B Album	Won

=== Billboard Latin Music Awards ===
The Billboard Latin Music Awards are awarded annually by the Billboard magazine in the United States. Brown has received four nominations.

Year	Nominee / work	Award	Result
2013	Chris Brown	Crossover Artist of the Year	Nominated
2013	"Algo Me Gusta de Ti" (with Wisin & Yandel and T-Pain)	Song of the Year, Vocal Event	Nominated
2013	"Algo Me Gusta de Ti" (with Wisin & Yandel and T-Pain)	Latin Pop Song of the Year	Nominated
2022	Chris Brown	Crossover Artist of the Year	Nominated

=== Billboard R&B/Hip-Hop Awards ===
The Billboard R&B/Hip-Hop Awards reflect the performance of recordings on the Hot R&B/Hip-Hop Songs and Hot Rap Tracks. Brown has been nominated three times.

Year	Nominee / work	Award	Result
2006	"Run It!" (with Juelz Santana)	Hot R&B/Hip-Hop Songs Sales	Nominated
2006	Chris Brown	Top R&B/Hip-Hop Songs Artist	Nominated
2006	Chris Brown	Top R&B/Hip-Hop Artist - New	Nominated

=== Billboard.com Mid-Year Music Awards ===
Year	Nominee / work	Award	Result
2011	Chris Brown at Good Morning America	Most Memorable Meltdown	Won
2012	Drake vs Chris Brown	Most Memorable Feud	Nominated
2012	Chris Brown/Rihanna Remixes	Most Shocking Moment	Nominated
2013	Drake vs Chris Brown	Most Memorable Feud	Nominated

== BMI Awards ==
=== BMI Pop Awards ===
Year	Nominee / work	Award	Result
2007	"Run It!" (with Juelz Santana)	Award-Winning Songs	Won
2009	"Forever"	Award-Winning Songs	Won
2009	"Kiss Kiss" (with T-Pain)	Award-Winning Songs	Won
2009	"No Air" (with Jordin Sparks)	Award-Winning Songs	Won
2009	"With You"	Award-Winning Songs	Won
2010	"Disturbia"	Award-Winning Songs	Won
2012	"Yeah 3x"	Award-Winning Songs	Won
2013	"International Love" (with Pitbull)	Award-Winning Songs	Won
2014	"Don't Wake Me Up"	Award-Winning Songs	Won

=== BMI R&B/Hip-Hop Awards ===
Year	Nominee / work	Award	Result
2006	"Run It!" (with Juelz Santana)	Award-Winning Songs	Won
2007	"Gimme That" (Remix) (with Lil Wayne)	Award-Winning Songs	Won
2008	"Kiss Kiss" (with T-Pain)	Award-Winning Songs	Won
2009	"Get Like Me" (with David Banner & Yung Joc)	Award-Winning Songs	Won
2009	"No Air" (with Jordin Sparks)	Award-Winning Songs	Won
2009	"Take You Down"	Award-Winning Songs	Won
2009	"With You"	Award-Winning Songs	Won
2011	"Deuces" (with Tyga & Kevin McCall)	Award-Winning Songs	Won
2012	"Look at Me Now" (with Busta Rhymes & Lil Wayne)	Award-Winning Songs	Won
2012	"My Last" (with Big Sean)	Award-Winning Songs	Won
2012	"She Ain't You"	Award-Winning Songs	Won
2013	"Strip" (with Kevin McCall)	Most Performed R&B/Hip-Hop Songs	Won
2013	"Birthday Cake" (with Rihanna)	Most Performed R&B/Hip-Hop Songs	Won
2014	"Fine China"	Most Performed R&B/Hip-Hop Songs	Won
2014	"Love More" (with Nicki Minaj)	Most Performed R&B/Hip-Hop Songs	Won
2015	"Main Chick" (with Kid Ink)	Most Performed R&B/Hip-Hop Songs	Won
2015	"New Flame" (with Usher & Rick Ross)	Most Performed R&B/Hip-Hop Songs	Won
2015	"Show Me" (with Kid Ink)	Most Performed R&B/Hip-Hop Songs	Won
2016	Chris Brown	Songwriter of the Year	Won
2016	"All Eyes On You" (with Meek Mill & Nicki Minaj)	Most Performed R&B/Hip-Hop Songs	Won
2016	"Ayo" (with Tyga)	Most Performed R&B/Hip-Hop Songs	Won
2016	"Fun" (with Pitbull)	Most Performed R&B/Hip-Hop Songs	Won
2016	"Hold You Down" (with DJ Khaled, August Alsina, Future & Jeremih)	Most Performed R&B/Hip-Hop Songs	Won
2016	"Post to Be" (with Omarion & Jhené Aiko)	Most Performed R&B/Hip-Hop Songs	Won
2017	"Back to Sleep"	Most Performed R&B/Hip-Hop Songs	Won
2017	"Do You Mind" (with DJ Khaled, Nicki Minaj, August Alsina, Jeremih, Future & Rick Ross)	Most Performed R&B/Hip-Hop Songs	Won
2020	"No Guidance" (with Drake)	Most Performed R&B/Hip-Hop Songs	Won
2021	"Heat" (with Gunna)	Most Performed R&B/Hip-Hop Songs	Won
2023	Chris Brown	Songwriters of the Year	Won
2023	"Baddest" (with Yung Bleu & 2 Chainz)	Most Performed R&B/Hip-Hop Songs	Won
2023	"Come Through" (with H.E.R.)	Most Performed R&B/Hip-Hop Songs	Won
2023	"Under the Influence"	Most Performed R&B/Hip-Hop Songs	Won
2024	"Superhero (Heroes & Villains)" (with Metro Boomin & Future )	Most Performed R&B/Hip-Hop Songs	Won
2026	"It Depends" (with Bryson Tiller)	Most Performed R&B/Hip-Hop Songs	Won
2026	"Mutt" (Remix) (with Leon Thomas)	Most Performed R&B/Hip-Hop Songs	Won
2026	"Residuals"	Most Performed R&B/Hip-Hop Songs	Won

=== BMI London Awards ===
Year	Nominee / work	Award	Result
2009	"With You"	Award-Winning Songs	Won
2009	"With You"	Urban Award	Won
2012	"Look at Me Now" (with Busta Rhymes & Lil Wayne)	Award-Winning Songs	Won
2013	"Don't Wake Me Up"	Award-Winning Songs	Won
2013	"I Can Only Imagine" (with David Guetta & Lil Wayne)	Award-Winning Songs	Won
2017	"How Many Times" (with DJ Khaled, Lil Wayne & Big Sean)	Award-Winning Songs	Won
2019	"Freaky Friday" (with Lil Dicky)	Award-Winning Songs	Won
2022	"Provide" (with G-Eazy & Mark Morrison)	Award-Winning Songs	Won

== Bravo Otto ==
The Bravo Otto award is a German accolade honoring excellence of performers in film, television and music. Presented annually since 1957, winners are selected by the readers of Bravo magazine. The award is presented in gold, silver and bronze.

Year	Nominee / work	Award	Result
2013	Chris Brown & Justin Bieber	Super-BFFs	Silver

== Global Awards ==
The Global Awards are held by Global and reward music played on British radio stations including Capital, Capital XTRA, Heart, Classic FM, Smooth, Radio X, LBC and Gold, with the awards categories reflecting the songs, artists, programmes and news aired on each station.

Year	Nominee / work	Award	Result
2020	Chris Brown	Best Hip-Hop or RnB	Nominated

== Golden Raspberry Awards ==
The Golden Raspberry Awards is an award ceremony that honors the worst in film. Brown received one nomination.

Year	Nominee / work	Award	Result
2014	Battle of the Year	Worst Supporting Actor	Nominated

== Grammy Awards ==
The Grammy Awards are awarded annually by the National Academy of Recording Arts and Sciences. Brown has been nominated twenty eight times and won two Grammy Awards for Best R&B Album.

Year	Nominee / work	Award	Result
2007	Chris Brown	Best New Artist	Nominated
2007	Chris Brown	Best Contemporary R&B Album	Nominated
2008	"Kiss Kiss" (with T-Pain)	Best Rap/Sung Collaboration	Nominated
2009	"No Air" (with Jordin Sparks)	Best Pop Collaboration with Vocals	Nominated
2009	"Take You Down"	Best Male R&B Vocal Performance	Nominated
2011	Graffiti	Best Contemporary R&B Album	Nominated
2011	"Take My Time" (with Tank)	Best R&B Performance by a Duo or Group with Vocals	Nominated
2011	"Deuces" (with Tyga & Kevin McCall)	Best Rap/Sung Collaboration	Nominated
2012	F.A.M.E.	Best R&B Album	Won
2012	"Look at Me Now" (with Lil Wayne & Busta Rhymes)	Best Rap Performance	Nominated
2012	"Look at Me Now" (with Lil Wayne & Busta Rhymes)	Best Rap Song	Nominated
2013	Fortune	Best Urban Contemporary Album	Nominated
2015	X	Best Urban Contemporary Album	Nominated
2015	"New Flame" (with Usher & Rick Ross)	Best R&B Performance	Nominated
2015	"New Flame" (with Usher & Rick Ross)	Best R&B Song	Nominated
2016	"Only" (with Nicki Minaj, Drake & Lil Wayne)	Best Rap/Sung Collaboration	Nominated
2020	"No Guidance" (with Drake)	Best R&B Song	Nominated
2022	Back of My Mind (as featured artist and songwriter)	Album of the Year	Nominated
2022	Donda (as featured artist and songwriter)	Album of the Year	Nominated
2023	Breezy (Deluxe)	Best R&B Album	Nominated
2024	"Summer Too Hot"	Best R&B Performance	Nominated
2025	11:11 (Deluxe)	Best R&B Album	Won
2025	"Residuals"	Best R&B Performance	Nominated
2025	"Sensational" (with Davido & Lojay)	Best African Music Performance	Nominated
2026	"It Depends" (with Bryson Tiller)	Best R&B Performance	Nominated
2026	"It Depends" (with Bryson Tiller)	Best R&B Song	Nominated
2027	Brown (The Chocolate Edition)	Best R&B Album	Pending
2027	"Fallin'" (with Leon Thomas)	Best R&B Collaboration or Duo/Group Performance	Pending

== iHeartRadio Music Awards ==
The iHeartRadio Music Awards is a music awards show, founded by iHeartRadio in 2014, to recognize the most popular artists and music over the past year as determined by the network's listeners.

Year	Nominee / work	Award	Result
2015	"Loyal" (with Lil Wayne & Tyga)	Hip Hop/R&B Song of the Year	Nominated
2015	"New Flame" (with Usher & Rick Ross)	Hip Hop/R&B Song of the Year	Nominated
2015	Teem Breezy	Best Fan Army	Nominated
2016	Chris Brown	R&B Artist of the Year	Won
2016	"Post to Be" (with Omarion & Jhené Aiko)	R&B Song of the Year	Nominated
2019	"Freaky Friday" (with Lil Dicky)	Best Music Video	Nominated
2020	Chris Brown	R&B Artist of the Year	Nominated
2020	"No Guidance" (with Drake)	R&B Song of the Year	Won
2021	Chris Brown	R&B Artist of the Year	Nominated
2021	Go Crazy" (with Young Thug)	Best Collaboration	Nominated
2021	Go Crazy" (with Young Thug)	R&B Song of the Year	Won
2021	"Heat" (with Gunna)	R&B Song of the Year	Nominated
2024	Chris Brown	R&B Artist of the Year	Nominated
2025	Chris Brown	R&B Artist of the Year	Nominated
2025	"Sensational" (with Davido & Lojay)	R&B Song of the Year	Nominated
2026	Chris Brown	Artist of the Year	Nominated
2026	Chris Brown	R&B Artist of the Year	Won
2026	"Residuals"	R&B Song of the Year	Nominated

== iHeartRadio Titanium Awards ==
iHeartRadio Titanium Awards are awarded to an artist when their song reaches 1 Billion Spins across iHeartRadio Stations.

Year	Nominee/Work		Result	Ref
2020	"No Guidance" (with Drake)	1 Billion Total Audience Spins on iHeartRadio Stations	Won	

== International Dance Music Awards ==
The International Dance Music Awards are an awards show for the dance and electronic music industry. Brown has been nominated six times.

Year	Nominee / work	Award	Result
2007	"Run It!" (with Juelz Santana)	Best R&B/Urban Dance Track	Nominated
2009	"Forever"	Best R&B/Urban Dance Track	Nominated
2012	"Beautiful People" (with Benny Benassi)	Best R&B/Urban Dance Track	Nominated
2012	"Look at Me Now" (with Lil Wayne & Busta Rhymes)	Best Rap/Hip Hop Dance Track	Nominated
2013	"International Love" (with Pitbull)	Best Latin Dance Track	Won
2015	"Loyal" (with Lil Wayne & Tyga)	Best R&B/Urban Dance Track	Nominated

== Kora Awards ==
The Kora Awards are music awards given annually for musical achievement in sub-Saharan Africa. Brown has won one award.

Year	Nominee / work	Award	Result
2013	Chris Brown	Best Male Artist of Diaspora USA	Won

== Lo Nuestro Awards ==
The Lo Nuestro Awards are awarded annually by television network Univision in the United States. Brown has received three nominations.

Year	Nominee / work	Award	Result
2014	"Algo Me Gusta de Ti" (with Wisin & Yandel and T-Pain)	Collaboration of the Year	Nominated
2014	"Algo Me Gusta de Ti" (with Wisin & Yandel and T-Pain)	Urban Song of the Year	Nominated
2023	"Nostálgico" (with Rvssian & Rauw Alejandro)	Crossover Collaboration of the Year	Nominated

== Meteor Music Awards ==
The Meteor Music Awards are an annual awards show from Irish Recording Music Association. Brown received one nomination.

Year	Nominee / work	Award	Result
2009	Chris Brown	Best International Male	Nominated

== MOBO Awards ==
The MOBO Awards (an acronym for "Music of Black Origin") were established in 1996 by Kanya King. They are held annually in the United Kingdom to recognize artists of any race or nationality performing music of black origin. Brown has won two awards from eight nominations.

Year	Nominee / work	Award	Result
2006	Chris Brown	Best International Male	Nominated
2006	"Run It!" (with Juelz Santana)	Best Video	Nominated
2008	Chris Brown	Best International Act	Won
2008	Chris Brown	Best R&B/Soul	Won
2011	"Champion" (with Chipmunk)	Best Video	Nominated
2014	Chris Brown	Best International Act	Nominated
2015	"Body on Me" (with Rita Ora)	Best Video	Nominated
2022	Chris Brown	Best International Act	Nominated

== MTV Awards ==
=== MTV Video Music Awards ===
The MTV Video Music Awards were established in 1984 by MTV to celebrate the top music videos of the year. Brown has won three awards from twenty three nominations.

Year	Nominee / work	Award	Result
2006	"Run It!" (with Juelz Santana)	Best New Artist	Nominated
2006	"Run It!" (with Juelz Santana)	Viewer's Choice	Nominated
2006	"Yo (Excuse Me Miss)"	Best R&B Video	Nominated
2007	"Wall to Wall"	Best Choreography in a Video	Nominated
2008	"Forever"	Video of the Year	Nominated
2008	"Forever"	Best Dancing in a Video	Nominated
2008	"Forever"	Best Choreography	Nominated
2008	"Kiss Kiss" (with T-Pain)	Best Choreography	Nominated
2008	"With You"	Best Male Video	Won
2008	"No Air" (with Jordin Sparks)	Best Female Video	Nominated
2011	"Look at Me Now" (with Lil Wayne & Busta Rhymes)	Best Hip-Hop Video	Nominated
2011	"Look at Me Now" (with Lil Wayne & Busta Rhymes)	Best Collaboration	Nominated
2012	"Turn Up the Music"	Best Male Video	Won
2012	"Turn Up the Music"	Best Choreography	Won
2013	"Fine China"	Best Choreography	Nominated
2014	"Loyal" (with Lil Wayne & Tyga)	Best Collaboration	Nominated
2016	Royalty	Breakthrough Long Form Video	Nominated
2021	"Go Crazy" (with Young Thug)	Best R&B	Nominated
2021	"Come Through" (with H.E.R.)	Best R&B	Nominated
2023	"How Does It Feel" (with Chlöe)	Best R&B	Nominated
2024	"Sensational" (with Davido & Lojay)	Best Afrobeats	Nominated
2025	"Residuals"	Best R&B	Nominated
2026	"It Depends" / "Obvious"	Best R&B	Nominated

=== MTV Australia Awards ===
The MTV Australia Awards were established in 2005 and is Australia's first awards show to celebrate both local and international acts. Brown has won one award from six nominations.

Year	Nominee / work	Award	Result
2006	Chris Brown	Best New Artist	Nominated
2006	"Yo (Excuse Me Miss)"	Best R&B Video	Nominated
2006	"Run It!" (with Juelz Santana)	Best R&B Video	Won
2006	"Run It!" (with Juelz Santana)	Viewer's Choice	Nominated
2009	"No Air" (with Jordin Sparks)	Best Collaboration	Nominated
2009	"Forever"	Best Moves	Nominated

=== MTV Europe Music Awards ===
The MTV Europe Music Awards were established in 1994 by MTV Europe to celebrate the most popular music videos in Europe. Brown has been nominated seven times.

Year	Nominee / work	Award	Result
2006	Chris Brown	Artist's Choice	Nominated
2008	Chris Brown	Best Male Act	Nominated
2008	Chris Brown	Ultimate Urban	Nominated
2012	"International Love" (with Pitbull)	Best Song	Nominated
2012	Chris Brown	Worldwide Act: North America	Nominated
2018	"Freaky Friday" (with Lil Dicky)	Best Video	Nominated
2023	Chris Brown	Best R&B	Won

=== MTV Video Music Awards Japan ===
The MTV Video Music Awards Japan were established in 2002 to celebrate the most popular music videos from Japanese and international artists. Brown has been nominated five times.

Year	Nominee / work	Award	Result
2008	"Kiss Kiss" (with T-Pain)	Best Male Video	Nominated
2008	"Kiss Kiss" (with T-Pain)	Best R&B Video	Nominated
2010	"Crawl"	Best R&B Video	Nominated
2012	"Yeah 3x"	Best Choreography	Nominated
2013	"Turn Up the Music	Best Choreography	Nominated

=== MTV Movie Awards ===
The MTV Movie Awards were established in 1992 and is a film awards show presented annually on MTV. Brown has been nominated once.

Year	Nominee / work	Award	Result
2008	This Christmas	Best Breakthrough Performance	Nominated

=== TRL Awards ===
The TRL Awards were established in 2006 by MTV Italy to celebrate the most popular artists and music videos in Italy. Brown has won one award.

Year	Nominee / work	Award	Result
2006	Chris Brown	Fake ID Award	Won

== MuchMusic Video Awards ==
The MuchMusic Video Awards are annual awards presented by the Canadian music video channel MuchMusic to honor the year's best music videos. Chris has been nominated four times.

Year	Nominee / work	Award	Result
2008	"Kiss Kiss" (with T-Pain)	Best International Video - Artist	Nominated
2012	"Look at Me Now" (with Busta Rhymes & Lil Wayne)	Video of the Year	Nominated
2012	"Next 2 You" (with Justin Bieber)	International Artist Video of the Year	Nominated
2012	"International Love" (with Pitbull)	Most Streamed Video of the Year	Nominated

== NAACP Image Awards ==
The NAACP Image Awards is an award presented annually by the American National Association for the Advancement of Colored People (NAACP) to honor outstanding people of color in film, television, music and literature. Brown has won twelve awards from twenty eight nominations.

Year	Nominee / work	Award	Result
2006	Chris Brown	Outstanding New Artist	Won
2007	Chris Brown	Outstanding Male Artist	Nominated
2008	Chris Brown	Outstanding Male Artist	Won
2008	Exclusive	Outstanding Album	Nominated
2009	Chris Brown	Outstanding Male Artist	Nominated
2009	"No Air" (with Jordin Sparks)	Outstanding Duo or Group	Nominated
2012	Chris Brown	Outstanding Male Artist	Nominated
2012	F.A.M.E.	Outstanding Album	Nominated
2020	"No Guidance" (with Drake)	Outstanding Duo, Group or Collaboration	Nominated
2020	"No Guidance" (with Drake)	Outstanding Music Video/Visual Album	Nominated
2022	"Go Crazy (Remix)" (with Young Thug, Future, Lil Durk & Mulatto)	Outstanding Duo, Group or Collaboration (Contemporary)	Nominated
2022	"Come Through" (with H.E.R.)	Outstanding Duo, Group or Collaboration (Contemporary)	Nominated
2023	Chris Brown	Outstanding Male Artist	Won
2023	Breezy	Outstanding Album	Nominated
2023	"Call Me Every Day" (with Wizkid)	Outstanding Duo, Group or Collaboration (Contemporary)	Won
2023	"Diana" (with Fireboy DML & Shenseea)	Outstanding International Song	Nominated
2024	Chris Brown	Outstanding Male Artist	Nominated
2024	"How We Roll" (with Ciara)	Outstanding Duo, Group or Collaboration (Traditional)	Won
2024	"How We Roll" (with Ciara)	Outstanding Music Video	Nominated
2024	"Sensational" (with Davido & Lojay)	Outstanding Music Video	Won
2024	"Sensational" (with Davido & Lojay)	Outstanding Duo, Group or Collaboration (Contemporary)	Won
2025	Chris Brown	Outstanding Male Artist	Won
2025	"Residuals"	Outstanding Soul/R&B Song	Won
2025	"Hmmm" (with Davido)	Outstanding International Song	Won
2026	Chris Brown	Outstanding Male Artist	Nominated
2026	"It Depends" (with Bryson Tiller)	Outstanding Soul/R&B Song	Won
2026	"It Depends" (The Remix) (with Bryson Tiller & Usher)	Outstanding Duo, Group or Collaboration (Contemporary)	Won
2026	"Mutt" (Remix) (with Leon Thomas)	Outstanding Duo, Group or Collaboration (Contemporary)	Nominated

== Nickelodeon Kids' Choice Awards ==
The Nickelodeon Kids' Choice Awards were established in 1988 and is an annual awards show that honors the year's biggest television, film and music acts, as voted by the people who watch the Nickelodeon cable channel. Brown has won one award from two nominations. Chris was nominated in 2009, but his nomination was withdrawn following his domestic violence case.

Year	Nominee / work	Award	Result
2007	Chris Brown	Favorite Male Singer	Nominated
2008	Chris Brown	Favorite Male Singer	Won
2009	Chris Brown	Favorite Male Singer	Eliminated
2009	"Kiss Kiss" (with T-Pain)	Favorite Song	Eliminated

=== Nickelodeon Australian Kids' Choice Awards ===
Year	Nominee / work	Award	Result
2006	Chris Brown	Fave International Artist	Nominated
2008	Chris Brown	Fave International Artist	Nominated
2008	"No Air" (with Jordin Sparks)	Fave Song	Nominated

=== Nickelodeon UK Kids' Choice Awards ===
The Nickelodeon UK Kids' Choice Awards is an annual awards show, similar to the American and Australian versions. Brown has won one award.

Year	Nominee / work	Award	Result
2008	Chris Brown	Favorite Singer	Won

== NRJ Music Awards ==
Year	Nominee / work	Award	Result
2009	Chris Brown	International Male Artist of the Year	Nominated

== Ozone Awards ==
The Ozone Awards is an awards show focused on Southern musicians. Brown has won one award of two nominations.

Year	Nominee / work	Award	Result
2008	Chris Brown	Best R&B Artist	Won
2008	"Get Like Me" (with David Banner & Yung Joc)	Ozone Awards for Best Rap/R&B Collaboration	Nominated

== People's Choice Awards ==
The People's Choice Awards is an annual award show from pop culture on Movie, television, and Music. Brown received two awards from nine nominations.

Year	Nominee / work	Award	Result
2009	Chris Brown	Favorite Male Artist	Won
2009	Chris Brown	Favorite Star Under 25	Nominated
2009	"No Air" (with Jordin Sparks)	Favorite Pop Song	Nominated
2009	"No Air" (with Jordin Sparks)	Favorite Combined Forces	Won
2009	"With You"	Favorite R&B Song	Nominated
2012	Chris Brown	Favorite R&B Artist	Nominated
2013	Chris Brown	Favorite Male Artist	Nominated
2015	Chris Brown	Favorite R&B Artist	Nominated
2016	Chris Brown	Favorite R&B Artist	Nominated

== Pollstar Awards ==
The Pollstar Awards is an annual award ceremony to honor artists and professionals in the concert and live music industry.

Year	Nominee / work	Award	Result
2021	Chris Brown	Hip-Hop/R&B Touring Artist of the Decade	Nominated
2026	Breezy Bowl XX	R&B Tour of the Year	Nominated

== Premios Juventud ==
The Premios Juventud are awarded annually by the television network Univision in the United States. Brown has received four nominations.

Year	Nominee / work	Award	Result
2012	"International Love" (with Pitbull)	La Combinación Perfecta (The Perfect Combination)	Nominated
2012	"International Love" (with Pitbull)	Mi Ringtone (My Ringtone)	Nominated
2013	"Algo Me Gusta de Ti" (with Wisin & Yandel and T-Pain)	La Combinación Perfecta (The Perfect Combination)	Nominated
2022	"Nostálgico" (with Rvssian & Rauw Alejandro)	Collaboration OMG	Nominated

== Premios Tu Mundo ==
The Premios Tu Mundo are presented annually by the television network Telemundo in the United States. Brown received two nominations.

Year	Nominee / work	Award	Result
2013	"Algo Me Gusta de Ti" (with Wisin & Yandel and T-Pain)	Most Popular Song of the Year	Nominated
2013	"Algo Me Gusta de Ti" (with Wisin & Yandel and T-Pain)	Best Music Video	Nominated

== Premios Tu Música Urbano ==
The Premios Tu Música Urbano are presented annually by the television network Telemundo in the United States.

Year	Nominee / work	Award	Result
2022	"Nostálgico" (with Rvssian & Rauw Alejandro)	Top Latin Crossover Song	Nominated

== Radio Disney Music Awards ==
First held in 2002, the Radio Disney Music Awards is an annual awards show which is operated and governed by Radio Disney. Brown received two nominations.

Year	Nominee / work	Award	Result
2006	Chris Brown	Best Male Artist	Nominated
2006	Chris Brown	Best Dance Style	Nominated

== Soul Train Music Awards ==
The Soul Train Music Awards is an annual awards show aired in national broadcast syndication that honors the best in African American music and entertainment established in 1987. Brown has won 14 awards from 61 nominations.

Year	Nominee / work	Award	Result
2006	Chris Brown	Best R&B/Soul New Artist	Won
2007	Chris Brown	Best R&B/Soul Album	Nominated
2007	"Yo (Excuse Me Miss)"	Best R&B/Soul Single	Nominated
2011	Chris Brown	Best R&B/Soul Male Artist	Nominated
2011	F.A.M.E.	Album of the Year	Won
2011	"She Ain't You"	Song of the Year	Nominated
2011	"She Ain't You"	Best Dance Performance	Nominated
2011	"Look at Me Now" (with Busta Rhymes & Lil Wayne)	Best Hip-Hop Song of the Year	Nominated
2012	"Turn Up the Music"	Best Dance Performance	Nominated
2013	Chris Brown	Best R&B/Soul Male Artist	Nominated
2013	"Fine China"	Song of the Year	Nominated
2013	"Fine China"	Video of the Year	Nominated
2013	"Fine China"	Best Dance Performance	Nominated
2013	"Put It Down" (with Brandy)	Best Collaboration	Nominated
2014	Chris Brown	Best R&B/Soul Male Artist	Nominated
2014	"Loyal" (with Lil Wayne & Tyga)	Song of the Year	Nominated
2014	"Loyal" (with Lil Wayne & Tyga)	Best Hip-Hop Song of the Year	Won
2014	"Loyal" (with Lil Wayne & Tyga)	Best Dance Performance	Won
2014	"Loyal" (with Lil Wayne & Tyga)	Best Collaboration	Won
2014	"New Flame" (with Usher & Rick Ross)	Best Collaboration	Nominated
2014	"New Flame" (with Usher & Rick Ross)	Video of the Year	Nominated
2015	Chris Brown	Best R&B/Soul Male Artist	Nominated
2015	X	Album of the Year	Nominated
2015	"Ayo" (with Tyga)	Best Dance Performance	Nominated
2015	"Post to Be" (with Omarion & Jhené Aiko)	Best Collaboration	Won
2017	Chris Brown	Best R&B/Soul Male Artist	Nominated
2017	"Party" (with Usher & Gucci Mane)	Video of the Year	Nominated
2017	"Party" (with Usher & Gucci Mane)	Best Dance Performance	Nominated
2018	Heartbreak on a Full Moon	Album/Mixtape of the Year	Nominated
2018	"Tempo"	Best Dance Performance	Nominated
2019	Chris Brown	Best R&B/Soul Male Artist	Nominated
2019	Indigo	Album/Mixtape of the Year	Nominated
2019	"No Guidance" (with Drake)	Song of the Year	Won
2019	"No Guidance" (with Drake)	Video of the Year	Nominated
2019	"No Guidance" (with Drake)	Best Dance Performance	Won
2019	"No Guidance" (with Drake)	Best Collaboration	Won
2019	"No Guidance" (with Drake)	The Ashford & Simpson Songwriter's Award	Nominated
2019	"Easy (Remix)" (with DaniLeigh)	Best Dance Performance	Nominated
2020	Chris Brown	Best R&B/Soul Male Artist	Won
2020	Slime & B (with Young Thug)	Album of the Year	Nominated
2020	"Go Crazy" (with Young Thug)	Song of the Year	Won
2020	"Go Crazy" (with Young Thug)	Video of the Year	Nominated
2020	"Go Crazy" (with Young Thug)	Best Dance Performance	Won
2020	"Go Crazy" (with Young Thug)	Best Collaboration	Won
2020	"Go Crazy" (with Young Thug)	The Ashford & Simpson Songwriter's Award	Nominated
2021	Chris Brown	Best R&B/Soul Male Artist	Nominated
2021	"Go Crazy (Remix)" (with Young Thug, Future, Lil Durk & Mulatto)	Video of the Year	Nominated
2021	"Go Crazy (Remix)" (with Young Thug, Future, Lil Durk & Mulatto)	Best Collaboration	Nominated
2021	"Come Through" (with H.E.R.)	Best Collaboration	Nominated
2021	"Come Through" (with H.E.R.)	The Ashford & Simpson Songwriter's Award	Nominated
2021	"City Girls" (with Young Thug)	Best Dance Performance	Nominated
2022	Chris Brown	Best R&B/Soul Male Artist	Won
2022	Breezy	Album of the Year	Nominated
2022	"WE (Warm Embrace)"	Best Dance Performance	Nominated
2022	"Call Me Every Day" (with Wizkid)	Best Dance Performance	Nominated
2022	"Call Me Every Day" (with Wizkid)	Best Collaboration	Nominated
2023	Chris Brown	Best R&B/Soul Male Artist	Nominated
2023	"How We Roll" (with Ciara)	Best Dance Performance	Nominated
2023	"Summer Too Hot"	Best Dance Performance	Nominated
2023	"Under the Influence"	Best Dance Performance	Nominated
2026	"It Depends" (with Bryson Tiller)	R&B/Soul Song of the Year	Pending

== Spotify Awards ==
Year	Nominee / work	Award	Result
2020	"No Guidance" (with Drake)	Spotify Awards	Nominated

== Teen Choice Awards ==
The Teen Choice Awards were established in 1999 to honor the year's biggest achievements in music, movies, sports and television, as voted for by young people aged between 13 and 19. Brown has won seven awards from twenty three nominations.

Year	Nominee / work	Award	Result
2006	Chris Brown	Choice Music: Male Artist	Nominated
2006	Chris Brown	Choice Music: R&B Artist	Nominated
2006	Chris Brown	Choice Music: Male Breakout Artist	Won
2006	Chris Brown	Choice Male Hottie	Nominated
2007	Stomp the Yard	Choice Movie: Breakout Male	Nominated
2007	Chris Brown	Choice Music: R&B Artist	Nominated
2007	"Wall to Wall"	Choice Music: R&B Track	Nominated
2008	Chris Brown	Choice Music: Male Artist	Won
2008	Chris Brown	Choice Music: R&B Artist	Won
2008	Chris Brown	Choice Male Hottie	Nominated
2008	Chris Brown	Choice Red Carpet Fashion Icon Male	Nominated
2008	Chris Brown	Post Show: Best Acceptable Speech	Nominated
2008	Chris Brown	Post Show: Spontaneously Crazy Moment	Nominated
2008	Chris Brown	Post Show: Best Dressed Male	Nominated
2008	Chris Brown	Post Show: Celebrity Cameo	Won
2008	"With You"	Choice Music: Single	Nominated
2008	"Forever"	Choice Music: R&B Track	Won
2008	"Forever"	Choice Music: Summer Song	Nominated
2008	"No Air" (with Jordin Sparks)	Choice Music: Love Song	Nominated
2008	"No Air" (with Jordin Sparks)	Choice Music: Hook Up	Won
2008	"Shawty Get Loose" (with Lil Mama & T-Pain)	Choice Music: Hook Up	Nominated
2008	"Shawty Get Loose" (with Lil Mama & T-Pain)	Choice Music: Rap/Hip Hop Track	Won
2016	"Something New" (with Zendaya)	Choice Music: R&B/Hip-Hop Song	Nominated

== Urban Music Awards ==
The Urban Music Awards is an annual awards show that recognizes the achievements of hip-hop, R&B and soul artists. Chris Brown has won eight.

Year	Nominee / work	Award	Result
2011	Chris Brown	International Artist of the Year	Won
2011	"Champion" (with Chipmunk)	Best Collaboration	Won
2012	Chris Brown	International Artist of the Year	Won
2015	Chris Brown	Best International Artist	Nominated
2015	"Body On Me" (with Rita Ora)	Best Video	Nominated
2015	"Body On Me" (with Rita Ora)	Best Collaboration	Nominated
2017	Chris Brown	Artist of the Year (USA)	Won
2017	Chris Brown	Best International Act	Nominated
2018	Chris Brown	Artist of the Year (USA)	Won
2018	Chris Brown	Best International Artist	Nominated
2020	Chris Brown	Artist of the Year (USA)	Won
2023	Chris Brown	Artist of the Year (USA)	Won
2023	Chris Brown	Most Inspiring Act	Nominated
2023	Breezy	Best Album	Won
2023	"Call Me Every Day" (with Wizkid)	Best Collaboration	Nominated
2023	"Monalisa (Remix)" (with Lojay & Sarz)	Best Single	Nominated

== Vevo Certified Award ==
Vevo Certified Award honors artists with over 100 million views on Vevo and its partners (including YouTube) through special features on the Vevo website. It was launched in June 2012.

Year	Nominee/Work	Certified videos	Ref.
2026	Chris Brown	45	
As of October 23, 2026

== WatsUp TV Africa Music Video Awards ==
WatsUp TV Africa Music Video Awards is an award presented by the TV channel WatsUp TV to honor the best in the African music videos scene. Chris Brown has received one nomination.

Year	Nominee / work	Award	Result
2016	"Little More (Royalty)"	Best International Video	Nominated

== World Music Awards ==
The World Music Awards were established in 1989 and is an international awards show that annually honors musicians based on their worldwide sales figures, which are provided by the International Federation of the Phonographic Industry. Brown has won one award from seventeen nominations.

Year	Nominee / work	Award	Result
2006	Chris Brown	World's Best R&B Artist	Nominated
2008	Chris Brown	World's Best Male R&B Artist	Won
2014	Chris Brown	World's Best Male Artist	Nominated
2014	Chris Brown	World's Best Live Act	Nominated
2014	Chris Brown	World's Best Entertainer of the Year	Nominated
2014	Fortune	World's Best Album	Nominated
2014	"Don't Wake Me Up"	World's Best Song	Nominated
2014	"Don't Think They Know" (with Aaliyah)	World's Best Song	Nominated
2014	"Fine China"	World's Best Song	Nominated
2014	"It Won't Stop" (Remix) (with Sevyn Streeter)	World's Best Song	Nominated
2014	"Love More" (with Nicki Minaj)	World's Best Song	Nominated
2014	"Show Me" (with Kid Ink)	World's Best Song	Nominated
2014	"Don't Wake Me Up"	World's Best Video	Nominated
2014	"Don't Think They Know" (with Aaliyah)	World's Best Video	Nominated
2014	"Fine China"	World's Best Video	Nominated
2014	"It Won't Stop" (Remix) (with Sevyn Streeter)	World's Best Video	Nominated
2014	"Love More" (with Nicki Minaj)	World's Best Video	Nominated

== The Headies ==
The Headies (originally called the Hip Hop World Awards) is a music awards show established in 2006 by the Hip Hop World Magazine of Nigeria to recognize outstanding achievements in the Nigerian music industry. Brown won international artiste of the year in 2022, beating Bieber, Beyoncé, Drake, Ed Sheeran and Nas. The category is designed for non-African artists or groups with outstanding achievements and impact on Afrobeats.

Year	Nominee / work	Award	Result
2022	Chris Brown	International Artiste of the Year	Won
2025	"Hmmm" (with Davido)	International Artiste of the Year	Nominated

== Youth Rock Awards ==
The Youth Rock Awards is an award event held in 2011, honoring stars in Music and Movie. Brown received one nomination.

Year	Nominee / work	Award	Result
2011	"Next 2 You" (with Justin Bieber)	Rockin' Music Video of the Year	Nominated
