= Autumn Leaves (Chris Brown song) =

Song by Chris Brown featuring Kendrick Lamar

from the album X
- Released: September 16, 2014
- Recorded: 2013
- Genre: Soul; alternative hip hop
- Length: 4:28
- Label: RCA
- Songwriters: Chris Brown; Kendrick Duckworth
- Producers: B.A.M.; RoccStar

Music video
- "Autumn Leaves" on YouTube

"Autumn Leaves" is a song by American singer Chris Brown, featuring American rapper Kendrick Lamar, taken from his sixth studio album X (2014). It was written by Brown and Lamar, while its production was handled by B.A.M. and RoccStar. Musically, "Autumn Leaves" is a soul track that features alternative hip hop parts. The song contains lyrics about a lover’s departure and internal conflict, while Lamar's verse coaches Brown through his emotional challenges. "Autumn Leaves" received critical praise from music critics, which praised the artists' performances and its lyrical content. "Autumn Leaves" earned Gold certification by the Recording Industry Association of America (RIAA).

== Background ==
The track was revealed by Brown on March 26, 2013, during an interview for Rolling Stone. The singer told Rolling Stone that the evocative guitar spirals and passionate vocals driving “Autumn Leaves” turned it into “a real emo record”. Brown also spoke about Lamar's appearance on the track: “I picked Kendrick because his subject matter as a lyricist is beyond everybody else’s.” Brown told Billboard in 2013 that the song was "a potential second single" from X, following its lead single "Fine China"; however the track ended up not being released as a single.

== Composition and lyrics ==
"Autumn Leaves" is a "quiet" soul ballad, that features an "aggressive, emotional" rap verse by Kendrick Lamar. Its production was described as "guitar-driven" and "Asian-inspired". The "reflective" lyrical content of the track features Brown comparing a lover’s departure with summer’s, in time for fall: “It seems that all the autumn leaves are falling/ I feel like you’re the only reason for it”, while Lamar raps on Brown’s behalf, mood-swinging from thoughtful to vicious: “And they won’t let me live/ Even when it’s remorse that I give/ When are they gon’ rejoice and forgive/ Tell me how [do] I stay positive?”.

== Reception ==
"Autumn Leaves" received critical acclaim from music critics. Complex called the track "solemn", writing that "Brown examines a fleeting love with splendid gloominess". The A.V. Club wrote that the song is an example of X "[giving] itself over to deeper emotions in its second half". Miranda J. of XXL gave a positive review saying that "the chemistry between the two on the track is undeniable", calling Lamar's part "the best rap verse on the album". Brad Wete of Billboard found "Autumn Leaves" to be part of Brown's vulnerable side of his discography. Slant Magazine's Alexa Camp described its lyrical content as "soul-baring".

== Music video ==
The music video for the song, filmed in late August 2013, was released on January 22, 2015, and was directed by Colin Tilley. The video is "samurai-themed", and was filmed in a lush rainforest in Hawaii, showcasing cherry blossoms and Buddha statues. In the video Brown appears dressed as a samurai, crossing paths with his beloved, played by the singer's ex-girlfriend, Karrueche Tran. Kendrick Lamar does not appear in the video.

== Charts ==
Chart performance for "Autumn Leaves"
Chart (2014)	Peak position
UK R&B (Official Charts Company)	24
UK Singles (Official Charts Company)	143
US Bubbling Under Hot 100 (Billboard)	10
US Hot R&B/Hip-Hop Songs (Billboard)	36

== Certifications ==
Certifications for "Autumn Leaves"
Region	Certification	Certified units/sales
New Zealand (RMNZ)	Gold	15,000^{‡}
United States (RIAA)	Gold	500,000^{‡}
^{‡} Sales+streaming figures based on certification alone.
