= X (Chris Brown song) =

Promotional single by Chris Brown

from the album X
- Released: August 25, 2014
- Genre: Alternative R&B; soul; EDM
- Length: 4:20
- Label: RCA
- Songwriters: Chris Brown; Thomas Pentz; Andrew Swanson; Leon Youngblood; Dewain Whitmore; Amber Streeter
- Producer: Diplo

Audio video
- "X" on YouTube

"X" is a song by American singer Chris Brown, taken from his sixth homonym studio album of the same name (2014), and was released as an instant-gratification track alongside the album pre-order on iTunes on August 25, 2014. It was written by Brown, Diplo, Djemba Djemba, RoccStar, Dewain Whitmore and Sevyn Streeter. Musically, "X" is a song that unites R&B and soul vocals with a dance beat. The song contains lyrics about Brown forgetting a failed relationship with a woman. "X" received critical praise from music critics, which praised the maturity of the lyrics and his production. Following the release of X, as a result of the strong digital downloads, the song charted on multiple charts worldwide; it peaked at number 98 on the US Billboard Hot 100, number 26 on the US Hot R&B/Hip-Hop Songs chart, number 63 on the French Singles Chart, number 12 on the UK Singles R&B Chart, number 81 on the UK Singles Chart and number 75 on the Australian Singles Chart.

== Composition and lyrics ==
"X" is a song that unites R&B and soul vocals with an EDM beat, with an instrumentation provided by a roland TR-808 and synthesizers. In the song Brown sings over a soft beat before transitioning into a more up-tempo sound. In the song, Brown says that he's forgetting a failed relationship with a woman, as he sings, "I swear to god i'm moving on!", admitting his past errors singing "I deal with my pain like a lonely child". Alex Camp of Slant Magazine speculated that the lyrics were about Brown's former relationship with recording artist Rihanna.

== Reception ==
"X" received critical praise from music critics. Miranda J. of XXL gave a positive review saying that in the song Brown "speaks of maturing and accepts his role in recent events, over the soft beat before transitioning into a more up-tempo sound". Brad Wete of Billboard called the song "Brown's most honest song", saying also that "it's safe to say that this is a man who knows he's got to get his life together and has to prove to himself and others". Slant Magazine's Alexa Camp felt that "X" was "an admirable attempt to take responsibility for his anger-management issues" from Brown, speculating that the lyrics were about Brown's relationship with Barbadian recording artist Rihanna. Marcus Dowling of HipHopDX wrote that "Brown emphatically stating that “[he] swears to god he’s moving on!” is either an amazing kiss-off to well documented on again/off again flame Rihanna.

== Charts ==
Chart performance for "X"
Chart (2014)	Peak position
Australia (ARIA)	75
France (SNEP)	63
Lebanon (Lebanese Top 20)	9
UK Singles (OCC)	91
UK Hip Hop/R&B (OCC)	12
US Billboard Hot 100	98
US Hot R&B/Hip-Hop Songs (Billboard)	26
