= X (Chris Brown album) =

- Standard cover. Deluxe cover features a golden X.

Studio album by Chris Brown
- Released: September 16, 2014
- Recorded: 2012–2014
- Studios: Glenwood Place (Burbank, California); Allure (Hollywood, California); Record Plant (Los Angeles, California); Chalice (Hollywood, California)
- Genre: R&B
- Length: 60:16
- Labels: Black Pyramid; CBE; RCA
- Producers: Ambiance; Anonymous; B.A.M.; Babydaddy; Count Justice; Daniel Coriglie; Danja; Dennis-Manuel Peters; Diplo; Free School; Freshm3n III; Glass John; Hey DJ; Mario Bakovic; Mel & Mus; Nic Nac; PK; R. Kelly; Razihel; RoccStar; Soundz; Steven Franks; TBHits; Tra Beats

Chris Brown chronology
Fortune (2012)	X (2014)	Fan of a Fan: The Album (2015)

Singles from X
- 1. "Fine China" Released: March 29, 2013; 2. "Don't Think They Know" Released: June 17, 2013; 3. "Love More" Released: July 16, 2013; 4. "Loyal" Released: December 19, 2013; 5. "New Flame" Released: June 30, 2014

X is the sixth studio album by American singer Chris Brown. It was released on September 16, 2014, by CBE and RCA Records. The album serves as the follow-up to his fifth album Fortune (2012). Brown for the album worked with several producers, including RoccStar, Danja, Nic Nac, Diplo and others. The album also features guest appearances by various urban artists, including Kendrick Lamar, R. Kelly, Akon, Nicki Minaj, Usher, Trey Songz, Tyga, Rick Ross, Brandy, Lil Wayne, Jhené Aiko and Aaliyah.

The release date of the album was delayed several times due to RCA's choices and the singer's legal problems throughout the last months of 2013 and the first half of 2014. Initially, the album release was set for July 16, 2013, then for August 20, 2013, then for May 5, 2014, and finally released on September 16, 2014. X was preceded by five singles: "Fine China", "Don't Think They Know", "Love More", "Loyal" and "New Flame". The album's fourth single "Loyal" became its most successful, by peaking at number nine on the US Billboard Hot 100 and at number 10 in the United Kingdom. Pushing the promotion for X further, Brown performed and appeared at several televised music events and music festivals across the United States. The album's aesthetics feature a black and white imagery.

X is an R&B album that also incorporates elements of disco, soul, pop and hip-hop. Its lyrics mostly explore themes of falling in love, internal conflict and sexual desire. The album received generally positive reviews from critics, who celebrated Brown's performances and the record's diverse sound, but were ambivalent towards its lyrical content. Critics considered X a major improvement compared to its critically panned predecessor Fortune. At the 2015 Grammy Awards, X was nominated for the Best Urban Contemporary Album, while "New Flame" was nominated for Best R&B Performance and Best R&B Song.

Commercially, the album debuted at number two on the US Billboard 200 selling 146,000 copies in its first week, becoming his first album to miss the summit of the chart since Graffiti (2009) and his third album to go to number two on the chart overall following Exclusive (2007). It also became his sixth consecutive top ten debut in the United States. By the end of 2015, the album had sold 404,000 copies in the United States. It has been certified double platinum by the Recording Industry Association of America (RIAA).

== Background ==
On November 8, 2012, during an interview with Power 106's (KPWR) in Los Angeles, California, Brown premiered the dance-pop track titled "Nobody's Perfect." The song was intended to serve as the lead single for his upcoming sixth album, under the working title of Carpe Diem, which was due to be released in 2013. However, the single was ultimately never released. Brown decided to revise the concept for the album, and following the conclusion of his Carpe Diem Tour in the last days of 2012, the singer's next studio album started to develop. The singer said that Carpe Diem was “about seizing the day, living in the moment. We had maybe 15 or 16 songs done for that album, and I did a Carpe Diem tour overseas. But when I got back from that tour, I kind of switched the album concept”. MTV News confirmed the development of the album, with Brown collaborating with producers, such as Timbaland, Danja and Diplo, among others.

On March 26, 2013, Brown announced the release of X, in various interviews and listening sessions. In an interview with Ebony, Brown spoke of taking his music in a different direction and changing his sound from the pop-infused and sexually explicit one of the previous album Fortune, to a more mature, soulful and vulnerable theme for the album. He said during an interview for Rolling Stone:

I tried to stay away from the Euro beats, and not go totally pop. I wanted to put that classic essence of R&B and soul with the new age of music now. There's a lot of live instruments, and a lot less Auto-Tune. I really wanted to demonstrate my vocal ability, creating the vibe of me singing along with a band.

Brown stated during a 2013 interview with Billboard that X was his "most personal album to date", explaining: "I've been going through my own trials and tribulations, overcoming a lot of stuff and persevering through things. And my release is the studio", wanting to bring on the album "songs about real life that people can identify with". In a 2022 interview, the singer reflected that during the period he was working on X, he experienced numerous instances where fans shared how his music had helped them through life-changing situations, making him realize that he was making music for an "actual purpose". Brown told Rolling Stone: “Whether it’s personal or life experiences – my girl, my exes, love in general, or just reality – I’m putting all that into this album”, also explaining the significance of the title:

It's the Roman numeral for 10. 5/5/89 is my birthday: 5 plus 5 is 10, and this is my tenth year since I got into music. 'X' is the 24th letter in the alphabet, and I will turn 24 when this album comes out. 'X' is also a metaphor, as in 'ex-girlfriend': it implies you're progressing and moving on in life, not holding on to the past and your old ways.

== Recording and production ==
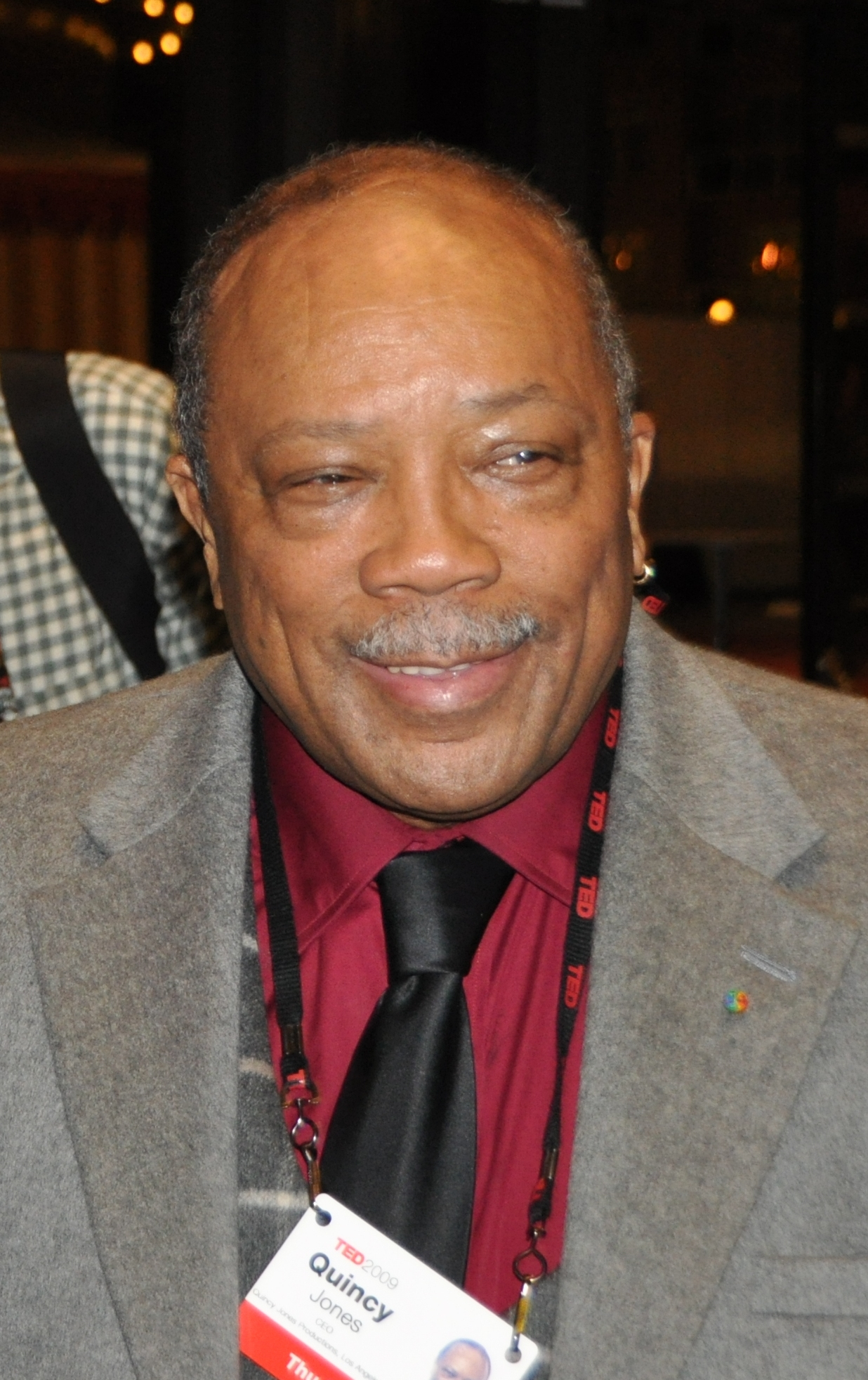
American record producer Quincy Jones (pictured) was the inspiration behind the recording process for X.

In March 2013, Brown spoke about working with artists and producers, such as Pharrell Williams, Ariana Grande, Kendrick Lamar, Ludacris, Rihanna, Nicki Minaj, Wiz Khalifa, Timbaland, Diplo, Danja and RoccStar. On July 4, 2013, Brown confirmed different guest features on the album, including Nicki Minaj, Kendrick Lamar, Rihanna, Wiz Khalifa, B.o.B and Kelly Rowland, among others. However, various artists who were announced didn’t make the cut for X. At the same time, the production would be confirmed by Timbaland, Diplo, Polow da Don, Danja, Pharrell and Drumma Boy.

Brown said that, while making the record, he wanted to "take the Quincy Jones approach" to his music, trying to hear what was in rotation on the radio as little as possible and locking himself in a recording studio with the producers so that the album could be as authentic as possible. Because of RCA's choices and the singer's legal problems, the release of X suffered several delays in 2013 and 2014, which prolonged the making of the album. On August 5, 2014, Brown said that he ended the recording sessions for the album, and that he had "about 50 songs" to sift through and perfect for X.

== Music and lyrics ==
"Time for Love"
A sample of "Time for Love"'s chorus, featuring Brown's harmonization and melisma over a disco-influenced instrumental.

X is an R&B album recognized for its "polished" and "diverse" sound, as noted by Andy Kellman of AllMusic. The record features prominent disco influences in tracks like "Add Me In," "Time for Love," "Lost in Ya Love," "Fine China," and "No Lights." Additionally, the album incorporates hip-hop elements, with productions characterized by heavy bass, double snare drums, and "neon" synths, as heard in songs such as "Loyal," "Came to Do," and "Love More." Critics praised Brown's vocal performances for highlighting his distinctive timbre, with songs like "X," "Lady in a Glass Dress," "Autumn Leaves," and "Do Better" showcasing his soul-driven delivery. Lyrically, "X" explores themes of falling in love, internal conflict and sexual desire. Ivan Rytlewski of The A.V. Club described the album as a "loveful and reflective record," infused with some of Brown's signature bad boy aesthetics. According to Kyle Denis of Billboard, "X found Brown surveying every pocket of contemporary R&B. Through it all, he balances his cavalier bad boy persona with more mature, soulful moments".

The album's opener "X", produced by Diplo, is a "progressive R&B" track that starts with Brown singing over a soft beat before transitioning into a more up-tempo sound with an electronic beat drop. In the title-track, Brown says that he is forgetting a failed relationship with a woman, as he sings, "I swear to God I’m moving on!", while also admitting his faults, and expressing his desire to prove his growth. On "Autumn Leaves", according to Brad Wete of Billboard, Brown "examines a fleeting love with gloominess and a high level of sensitivity", comparing a lover's departure with summer's, in time for fall: "It seems that all the autumn leaves are falling/ I feel like you're the only reason for it", while the guest Kendrick Lamar, raps on Brown's behalf, mood-swinging from thoughtful to vicious: "And they won’t let me live/ Even when it’s remorse that I give/ When are they gon' rejoice and forgive/ Tell me how [do] I stay positive?". "Do Better" was described by Wete as "a sparse and pensive duet" where Brown and Brandy play the two sides of a relationship where both feel like scorned lovers that do not know how to deal with their emotions, singing: "I learn more and more each day that I don't know me / It's like I can't get out of my own way". "Add Me In" is an up-tempo disco and R&B song with math-tinged lyrics about subtracting a girl's boyfriend to "add me in".

"Songs On 12 Play" is an R&B slow-jam, duetted with Trey Songz, featuring sexual content, with its lyrics paying homage to R. Kelly's works, mentioning many of his songs, as well as his debut studio album 12 Play. The track is followed by the interlude "101", where the singer expresses his sexual desire to the directly concerned lady, and subsequently by a collaboration with R. Kelly himself on the lustful "Drown In It". Both "Loyal" and "Stereotype" are centered on unfaithful women, while "Time for Love" and "Lady in a Glass Dress" talk about falling in love, with the last one being a promise to a girl recovering from a rough breakup that he "can make your dreams come true". Los Angeles Times's writer Mikael Wood defined "Lost In Ya Love" as a "melodious, sweet mid-tempo" where the singer expresses "the beauty of being romantically in love" to his woman. On the album's standard edition closing track, "Drunk Texting", Brown and Jhené Aiko play the role of two people who try to numb the pain of their heartbreak drinking alcohol, but end up texting their loved one while they are drunk.

== Release and promotion ==
On February 15, 2013, the singer unofficially released the song "Home", with an official videoclip, where he expresses a reflection on the bitter price of fame, and on how the only moment of respite from that thought is when he returns to the neighborhood where he grew up with people who knew him from the start. On March 26, 2013, Brown officially confirmed the title and release of X. In an interview with Rolling Stone, he revealed that the album would feature songs such as "X" with Diplo, "Autumn Leaves" with Kendrick Lamar, the soulful track "Lady in the Glass Dress," the rap song "Feel That," and "Add Me In," which blends R&B and disco. He also announced that the previously unofficially released song "Home" would be included as an official bonus track. Additionally, Brown mentioned the possibility of including an R&B collaboration with Rihanna titled "Put It Up," which he had written entirely himself..

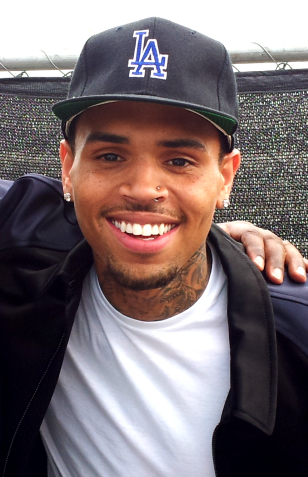
Brown backstage at the BET Awards 2013, where he performed three songs from X live.

On April 29, 2013, Brown announced a release date of July 16 for X, also unofficially releasing a song called "I Can't Win". In July, Brown previewed several unreleased songs through his social media accounts, also announcing that the album's release date was pushed back to August 20, 2013. However, it was later revealed that the album has been pushed back again to November 19, 2013. In the same month, Brown stated that the album will be a double disc album with 10 songs on each disc, and was now due on December 3.

On November 20, 2013, Brown was sentenced to an anger management rehabilitation center for three months, putting the December 2013 release of X in jeopardy. To "hold [fans] over until [the X album] drops," Brown released a mixtape, titled X Files on November 19, 2013, which consists of six tracks and features guest appearances from Busta Rhymes, Ludacris and Kid Ink, including the song "Main Chick". On February 22, 2014, it was announced that the album would be released on Brown's birthday, May 5, 2014. On April 14, 2014, Brown released a teaser of new track "Don't Be Gone Too Long" featuring Ariana Grande, however, the song and album were again delayed due to Brown's prison sentence. On August 3, 2014, Chris announced via Instagram that the album's release date will be on September 16, 2014. On August 6, 2014, the album cover shot by Eliot Lee Hazel was revealed. The title track "X" was released as an instant-gratification track alongside the album pre-order on iTunes on August 25, 2014.

The album was officially released on September 16, 2014, and was subsequently promoted through radio and magazine interviews, as well as live performances of its tracks on various televised shows. To further support the release of X, Brown embarked on his 2015 Between the Sheets Tour, alongside R&B singer Trey Songz and rapper Tyga.

== Singles ==
The album's lead single, titled "Fine China", was released on March 29, 2013, and it was sent to US rhythmic contemporary radio the following day. The production on the song was handled by RoccStar and PK. The song has since peaked at number 31 on the US Billboard Hot 100.

The album's second single, titled "Don't Think They Know", was released on June 17, 2013, and it was sent to rhythmic contemporary radio in the United States on July 1, 2013. The song features a posthumous appearance from R&B singer Aaliyah, while the production on the song was handled by Mel & Mus. The music video was shot, and filmed in Los Angeles, California and was released on June 17, 2013. Aaliyah appears as a hologram which are actually scenes from Aaliyah's 2000 video "Try Again" and 1996's "If Your Girl Only Knew". The song has since peaked at number 81 on the US Billboard Hot 100.

The album's third single, titled "Love More" featuring Nicki Minaj, was announced, which Brown performed the song along with Minaj at the 2013's BET Awards. On July 19, he released its cover artwork. On July 16, the song was released for digital download and a week later, the song was sent to rhythmic contemporary radio. The music video was officially released on August 17, 2013. The song has since peaked at number 23 on the US Billboard Hot 100.

On December 19, 2013, the album's fourth single, titled "Loyal", was released for digital download on iTunes. There are two versions to the song, the "West Coast Version" featuring Lil Wayne and Too Short, while the "East Coast Version" featuring Lil Wayne, and another rapper French Montana. In March 2014, the third and final version officially was released, featuring Lil Wayne and Tyga. The song has been commercially successful, reaching at number nine on the US Billboard Hot 100 and number 10 on the UK Singles Chart, making it Brown's highest-charting single from X in both countries.

On June 26, 2014, Brown previewed the track, titled "New Flame" featuring Usher and Rick Ross, along with the cover artwork on his Instagram account. The song was released on June 30, 2014, as the album's fifth single. The song peaked at number 27 on the US Billboard Hot 100.

=== Other songs ===
The song, titled "Don't Be Gone Too Long", was announced for single release for March 25, 2014, which in its original form features Ariana Grande. However, due to Brown's prison sentence, the single was eventually scrapped on March 17, even though the music video had already been filmed.

The title track "X", was released as an instant-gratification track alongside the album pre-order on iTunes on August 25, 2014. It peaked at number 98 on the US Billboard Hot 100.

The tracks "Drunk Texting", featuring Jhené Aiko, and "Autumn Leaves", featuring Kendrick Lamar, earned Gold certification by the Recording Industry Association of America (RIAA). A music video for "Autumn Leaves" was released in 2015.

== Critical reception ==
Professional ratings
Aggregate scores
Source	Rating
Metacritic	63/100
Review scores
Source	Rating
AllMusic	3.5/5 stars
The A.V. Club	B−
Billboard	4/5 stars
Complex	4/5 stars
HipHopDX	3.0/5
Los Angeles Times	2.5/4 stars
Rolling Stone	2.5/5 stars
Slant Magazine	2.5/5 stars
Sputnikmusic	3.8/5
XXL	4/5

According to review aggregator Metacritic, X received “generally positive” reviews, with a score of 63/100.

Many reviewers complimented Brown's performances, the album's production and overall sound. Brad Wete of Billboard gave the album a largely positive review, and said "Once gratuitous fillers are skipped, gems appear, especially on the closing half, where Brown is lucid about his tabloid love life." Miranda Johnson of XXL gave the album an XL (4/5), and argued that "X certainly proves that Chris Brown’s talent will forever shine through over whatever troubles come his way." A staff editor of Sputnikmusic gave the album a 3.8/5, and stated: "It is simply a good collection of good songs, put together by talented folks to showcase their obvious talents". Andy Kellman of AllMusic gave the album 3 and a half stars out of five, and enjoyed the albums diverse sound, while disliking some of the material, and said midway in the review that, "Brown combines memorable hooks with some stellar production work on the rubbery disco-funk of "Add Me In" (courtesy of Danja) and the blithe, swaying "Time for Love" (a collaboration with Jean Baptiste and Free School). In these and a few other songs, romantic affection, expressed with seemingly genuine sweetness, takes precedence over sexual aggression and petulance." Martín Caballero of USA Today wrote favorably of the album, saying that "without losing sight of his core audience, Chris Brown makes some commendable steps toward a more mature sound on his sixth album", also expressing that it "marks Chris Brown's spot". DJ Booth commended the singer's performances, stating: "There aren't many singers who have both the vocal ability and range of delivery to traverse a musical landscape that vast, but Brown does it all while impressively managing to maintain a real cohesion throughout X."

Other reviewers found issues with the length and content of the album. Evan Rytlewski of The A.V. Club gave the album a B−, and stated that while he found the album more appealing than Brown's previous releases, argued that "Running 21 tracks and 75 minutes in its deluxe edition, X sometimes threatens to be too much. But there’s enough appealing material to support that runtime." Marcus Dowling of HipHopDX gave the album a mixed score of 3 out of 5, praising Brown's musical abilities, but criticizing the album's structure, arguing that "Personality aside, Chris Brown’s ability to succeed artistically at delivering sounds in all three sectors of urban Pop makes this release a great, yet disjointed listen." Christopher Weingarten of Rolling Stone was largely divided in his review of the album, stating that "Chris Brown's sixth album is adventurous musically and a total mess lyrically – it's almost defiantly oblivious to his past as a domestic-abuser. Throughout, Brown plays the victim..." while also arguing that the content was "a shame" because "X is full of great beats", and gave the album 2 and half stars out of 5.

Other reviews were more negative. In another review with the score of 2 and a half stars out of five, Alexa Camp of Slant Magazine stated that “Aside from the standout club banger "Add Me In," which is steeped in arithmetic and trigonometry metaphors, and "101," which finds Brown doing "101 on the 101," the album's lyrics largely eschew mathematical objects in favor of soul-baring like "Autumn Leaves" and sex talk like "Songs on 12 Play"”. Jon Caramanica argued that "X is one of his least ambitious releases." Jim Farmer of New York Daily News agreed, and found that while there was a large wave of support for Brown, he had only wished that "... the new songs supported him as strongly."

=== Awards and nominations ===
Awards and nominations for X
Year	Ceremony	Category	Result	Ref.
2015	Grammy Awards	Best Urban Contemporary Album	Nominated	
2015	Billboard Music Awards	Top R&B Album	Nominated	
2015	American Music Awards	Favorite Soul/R&B Album	Nominated	
2015	Soul Train Music Awards	Album of the Year	Nominated	

== Commercial performance ==
The album debuted at number two on the US Billboard 200, with first-week sales of 146,000 copies in the United States. In its second week, the album dropped to number six on the chart, selling 36,000 copies. In its third week, the album dropped down to number nine on the chart, selling 23,000 copies. In its fourth week, the album dropped down to number 21 on the chart, selling 16,000 copies. By November 2015, the album has sold 404,000 copies in the United States. On October 1, 2021, X was certified double platinum by the Recording Industry Association of America (RIAA), for combined album sales, on-demand audio, video streams, track sales equivalent of two millions.

In 2014, X was ranked as the sixty-second most popular album of the year on the Billboard 200.

== Track listing ==
Credits adapted from the album's liner notes.

X track listing
No.	Title	Writer(s)	Producer(s)	Length
1.	"X"	Christopher Brown; Dewain Whitmore; Amber Streeter	Diplo; Djemba Djemba^{[a]}; RoccStar^{[a]}	4:20
2.	"Add Me In"	Brown; Eric Bellinger; Nieman Johnson	Danja; RoccStar^{[a]}	3:13
3.	"Loyal" (featuring Lil Wayne and Tyga)	Brown; Tyrone Griffin, Jr.; Dwayne Carter, Jr.; Michael Nguyen-Stevenson	Nic Nac; Kragen^{[a]}	4:24
4.	"New Flame" (featuring Usher and Rick Ross)	Brown; Keith Thomas; Justin Johnson; Verse Simmonds; Bellinger; William Roberts II; Mark Pitts; Usher Raymond IV	Count Justice	4:04
5.	"Songs on 12 Play" (featuring Trey Songz)	Brown; Simmonds; Tremaine Neverson; Robert Kelly	Mel & Mus	3:48
6.	"101 (Interlude)"	Brown	Ambiance; Soundz; Lukas Nathanson^{[a]}	1:16
7.	"Drown in It" (featuring R. Kelly)	Brown; Kelly	Dennis-Manuel Peters; Daniel Coriglie; Mario Bakovic; Kelly	3:42
8.	"Came to Do" (featuring Akon)	Brown	Nic Nac; Kragen^{[a]}	3:48
9.	"Stereotype"	Brown; Whitmore, Jr.; Hills; Bellinger; Johnson	Danja; RoccStar^{[a]}	3:51
10.	"Time for Love"	Brown; Ryan Buendia; Lauren Christy	Free School; Michael McHenry^{[a]}; Deezle^{[a]}; Evan Voytas^{[a]}	3:45
11.	"Lady in a Glass Dress (Interlude)"	Brown	Hey DJ	1:17
12.	"Autumn Leaves" (featuring Kendrick Lamar)	Brown; Kendrick Duckworth	B.A.M.; RoccStar	4:28
13.	"Do Better" (featuring Brandy)	Brown; Brandy Norwood	Glass John	3:48
14.	"See You Around"	Brown	Anonymous	3:42
15.	"Don't Be Gone Too Long"	Brown; McHenry; Buendia; Kyle Edwards; Cathy Dennis; Clarence Coffee, Jr.	Free School; Babydaddy	3:21
16.	"Body Shots"	Brown; Simmonds; Nicolò Arquilla; Daniele Autore; Joseph Bereal	Razihel; RoccStar^{[a]}	3:42
17.	"Drunk Texting" (featuring Jhené Aiko)	Brown; Simmonds; Victoria McCants	TBHits; Franks	3:47
Total length:				60:16

Deluxe edition (bonus tracks)
No.	Title	Writer(s)	Producer(s)	Length
18.	"Lost in Ya Love"	Brown	Tra Beats	3:49
19.	"Love More" (featuring Nicki Minaj)	Brown; Bellinger; Simmonds; Onika Maraj	Freshm3n III	3:09
20.	"Don't Think They Know" (featuring Aaliyah)	Melvin Hough II; Rivelino Wouter; Simmonds; Benjamin Bush; Jeffrey Walker; Tim Kelley; Bob Robinson; Jonathan Buck	Mel & Mus; Tim & Bob^{[a]}	3:57
21.	"Fine China"	Brown; Streeter; Bellinger; Pitts	RoccStar; PK	3:33
Total length:				74:44

Japanese edition and streaming version (bonus track)
No.	Title	Writer(s)	Producer(s)	Length
22.	"No Lights"	Brown; Bellinger	D'Mile	3:28
Total length:				78:12

Sample credits

- "Loyal" contains a portion of the composition "Money Ain't a Thang", written by Steve Arrington, Charles Carter, Shawn Carter, Jermaine Mauldin, Wuang Hankerson and Roger Parker, performed Jay-Z featuring Jermaine Dupri.
- "Loyal" contains a portion of the composition "Shine", performed by Cash Money Millionaires.
- "Songs on 12 Play" contains portions of the compositions "Sex Me" and "Stroke You Up", written by R. Kelly.
- "Don't Think They Know" contains a sample from "Don't Think They Know", written by Benjamin Bush and Jeffrey Walker, performed by Aaliyah; and a portion of the composition "They Don't Know", written by Jonathan Buck, Tim Kelley and Bob Robinson, performed by Jon B.

== Personnel ==
- Aaliyah – featured artist
- Jhené Aiko – featured artist
- Akon – featured artist
- Ambience & Soundz – producer
- The Anonymous – producer
- Marcella Araica – mixing
- B.A.M. – producer
- Babydaddy – producer
- Mario Bakovic – producer
- Jean Baptiste – producer
- Brandy – featured artist
- Chris Brown – creative director, executive producer, primary artist
- Tommy "TBHITS" Brown – producer
- Darhyl "DJ" Camper Jr. – producer
- Maddox Chhim – assistant
- Daniel Coriglie – producer
- Tom Coyne – mastering
- Danja – producer
- Diplo – producer
- Steven Franks – producer
- Free School – producer
- Abel Garibaldi – engineer
- Glass John – producer
- Mark "Exit" Goodchild – vocal engineer
- Trehy Harris – assistant
- Eliot Hazel – photography
- Jaycen Joshua – mixing
- Count Justice – producer
- Ryan Kaul – assistant
- R. Kelly – featured artist, producer
- Kendrick Lamar – featured artist
- Lil Wayne – featured artist
- Donnie Lyle – music direction
- Majors – programming
- Mel & Mus – producer
- Ian Mereness – engineer
- Natural – engineer
- Nic Nac – producer
- Nicki Minaj – featured artist
- Brent Paschke – guitar
- Dennis-Manuel Peters – producer
- Mark Pitts – executive producer
- Razihel – producer
- RoccStar – producer
- Rick Ross – featured artist
- Brian Springer – engineer, mixing, vocal engineer
- Andrew Swanson – drum programming
- Trey Songz – featured artist
- Tyga – featured artist
- Usher – featured artist
- Cooper Sebastian – graphic artist
- Courtney Walter – art direction, creative director, design

== Charts ==
=== Weekly charts ===
Weekly chart performance for X
Chart (2014)	Peak position
Australian Albums (ARIA)	4
Australian Urban Albums (ARIA)	2
Austrian Albums (Ö3 Austria)	15
Belgian Albums (Ultratop Flanders)	21
Belgian Albums (Ultratop Wallonia)	23
Canadian Albums (Billboard)	2
Danish Albums (Hitlisten)	5
Dutch Albums (Album Top 100)	5
Finnish Albums (Suomen virallinen lista)	46
French Albums (SNEP)	6
German Albums (Offizielle Top 100)	11
Irish Albums (IRMA)	5
Italian Albums (FIMI)	31
Japanese Albums (Oricon)	21
New Zealand Albums (RMNZ)	3
Norwegian Albums (VG-lista)	6
Portuguese Albums (AFP)	25
Scottish Albums (Official Charts)	8
South African Albums (RISA)	4
South Korean Albums (Circle)	61
Spanish Albums (Promusicae)	18
Swedish Albums (Sverigetopplistan)	37
Swiss Albums (Schweizer Hitparade)	3
UK Albums (Official Charts)	4
UK R&B Albums (Official Charts)	1
US Billboard 200	2
US Top R&B/Hip-Hop Albums (Billboard)	1

=== Year-end charts ===
2014 year-end chart performance for X
Chart (2014)	Position
Australian Urban Albums (ARIA)	18
US Billboard 200	62
US Top R&B/Hip-Hop Albums (Billboard)	16

2015 year-end chart performance for X
Chart (2015)	Position
Australian Urban Albums (ARIA)	43
US Billboard 200	85
US Top R&B/Hip-Hop Albums (Billboard)	38

== Certifications ==
Certifications for X
Region	Certification	Certified units/sales
Australia (ARIA)	Gold	35,000^{‡}
Denmark (IFPI Danmark)	Gold	10,000^{‡}
New Zealand (RMNZ)	3× Platinum	45,000^{‡}
South Africa (RISA)	Platinum	50,000^{‡}
United Kingdom (BPI)	Gold	100,000^{‡}
United States (RIAA)	2× Platinum	2,000,000^{‡}
^{‡} Sales+streaming figures based on certification alone.

== Release history ==
Release dates and formats for X
Region	Date	Label	Edition(s)	Format(s)	Ref.
Germany	September 12, 2014	RCA Records	Standard; deluxe	CD; digital download	
Ireland	September 12, 2014	RCA Records	Standard; deluxe	CD; digital download	
Netherlands	September 12, 2014	RCA Records	Standard; deluxe	CD; digital download	
France	September 15, 2014	RCA Records	Standard; deluxe	CD; digital download	
United Kingdom	September 15, 2014	RCA Records	Standard; deluxe	CD; digital download	
Canada	September 16, 2014	RCA Records	Standard; deluxe	CD; digital download	
Japan	September 16, 2014	RCA Records	Standard; deluxe	CD; digital download	
New Zealand	September 16, 2014	RCA Records	Standard; deluxe	CD; digital download	
United States	September 16, 2014	RCA Records	Standard; deluxe	CD; digital download	
