= Love More =

2013 single by Chris Brown

Single by Chris Brown featuring Nicki Minaj

from the album X (Deluxe edition)
- Released: July 19, 2013
- Recorded: 2012–2013
- Genre: R&B; hip hop
- Length: 3:09
- Label: RCA
- Songwriters: Chris Brown; Onika Maraj; Darrell Eversley; Howard Eversley; Shaun Spearman; Verse Simmonds; Eric Bellinger
- Producer: FRESHM3N III

Chris Brown singles chronology
"Don't Think They Know" (2013)	"Love More" (2013)	"Sweet Serenade" (2013)

Nicki Minaj singles chronology
"Get Like Me" (2013)	"Love More" (2013)	"I Wanna Be with You" (2013)

Music video
- "Love More" on YouTube

"Love More" is a song by American singer Chris Brown featuring rapper Nicki Minaj. The song was written by Chris Brown, Nicki Minaj, Verse Simmonds, Howard Eversley, Darrell Eversley, and Shaun J. Spearman, with the latter three also handling production under their production team FRESHM3N III. It was released on July 19, 2013, as the third official single from the former's sixth studio album X, and peaked at number 23 on the US Billboard Hot 100 and number 29 on the Australia Singles Chart.

== Background ==
Parts of "Love More" were premiered at the 2013 BET Awards, along with "Don't Think They Know" and "Fine China". MTV praised the performance stating: "Brown hit the stage with his backup dancers in tow, sporting a black leather jacket while all the members of his crew donned sweatshirts with a neon 'X' across them, a nod to his upcoming July 16 album. For 'Fine China', Breezy kept it thematic, with images of Chinese fire dragons and fire lanterns flashing across the LED screen behind him, as he delivered his usual flawless choreography."

On March 29, 2013, Brown confirmed that Minaj will appear on his upcoming album, saying that she just gave him a "mean verse". Minaj later publicly complimented the beat of the song, stating that her fans were going to love the song. On June 30, the song premiered as a live performance by Brown and Minaj at the opening act of the BET Awards 2013. The name of the song was also confirmed to be "Love More". The track was planned to be released with the whole album on July 16, but, for unknown reasons, the release was pushed back. Minaj was asked about the song and she replied "one more week," on July 16.

The song premiered on the radio station 99.1 KGGI on July 22 at 6:30 am. It was sent to Rhythmic radio on July 23, 2013.

== Music video ==
The music video was filmed on August 2, 2013, in Los Angeles, California and was directed by Brown himself. The video premiered on YouTube on August 17, 2013. It features Brown taking some of his friends to a night club in his car, when he turns on the radio and the song starts. The music video features a cameo by Nick Swardson as they drive shotgun. At the club, Brown is seen flirting, singing and performing synchronized dance moves with his backup dancers, while multiple shots of Minaj are shown. The video was uploaded on Brown's Vevo channel on August 29, 2013.

== Critical reception ==
The song received widely positive reviews. Billboard praised the single stating: "Raunchy and sure to be a club favorite, 'Love More' is the latest single off of Brown's forthcoming album, X." AllHipHop also released a positive review stating: "Over a frenzied, dubstep-inspired club beat, Nicki and Brown exchange sexual innuendos, party recaps and their own brand of love."

== Charts ==
=== Weekly charts ===
Weekly chart performance for "Love More"
Chart (2013–2014)	Peak position
Australia (ARIA)	29
Austria (Ö3 Austria Top 40)	72
Belgium (Ultratip Bubbling Under Flanders)	24
Belgium (Ultratop Flanders Urban)	26
Belgium (Ultratip Bubbling Under Wallonia)	26
France (SNEP)	118
Germany (GfK)	48
UK Singles (Official Charts)	32
UK Hip Hop/R&B (Official Charts)	6
US Billboard Hot 100	23
US Hot R&B/Hip-Hop Songs (Billboard)	7
US R&B/Hip-Hop Airplay (Billboard)	6
US Pop Airplay (Billboard)	39
US Rhythmic Airplay (Billboard)	3

=== Year-end charts ===
2013 year-end chart performance for "Love More"
Chart (2013)	Position
US Hot R&B/Hip-Hop Songs (Billboard)	31
US Rhythmic (Billboard)	23
US Streaming Songs (Billboard)	68

2014 year-end chart performance for "Love More"
Chart (2014)	Position
US Hot R&B/Hip-Hop Songs (Billboard)	57
US Rhythmic (Billboard)	34

== Certifications ==
Certifications for "Love More"
Region	Certification	Certified units/sales
Australia (ARIA)	Platinum	70,000^{^}
New Zealand (RMNZ)	Gold	7,500^{*}
United Kingdom (BPI)	Silver	200,000^{‡}
United States (RIAA)	2× Platinum	2,000,000^{‡}
^{*} Sales figures based on certification alone.^{^} Shipments figures based on certification alone.^{‡} Sales+streaming figures based on certification alone.

== Radio and release history ==
Country	Date	Format	Label
United States	July 16, 2013	Digital download	RCA
United States	July 23, 2013	Rhythmic contemporary radio	RCA
United States	October 8, 2013	Mainstream radio	RCA
