= New Flame =

Song by Chris Brown

Single by Chris Brown featuring Usher and Rick Ross

from the album X
- Released: June 30, 2014
- Recorded: 2013–2014
- Genre: R&B
- Length: 4:03
- Label: RCA
- Songwriters: Chris Brown; Justin Booth Johnson; Keith Thomas; Mark Pitts; Eric Bellinger; William Roberts; Malissa Hunter; James Chambers; Maurice "Verse" Simmonds
- Producer: Count Justice Trabeats

Chris Brown singles chronology
"Main Chick" (2014)	"New Flame" (2014)	"Hold You Down" (2014)

Usher singles chronology
"Good Kisser" (2014)	"New Flame" (2014)	"She Came to Give It to You" (2014)

Rick Ross singles chronology
"Options" (2014)	"New Flame" (2014)	"Sorry" (2015)

Music video
- "New Flame" on YouTube

"New Flame" is a song recorded by American singer Chris Brown. It was originally released as a promotional single from Brown's album on March 5, 2014. This version only featured rapper Rick Ross as a guest artist. A few months later, a day after the 2014 BET Awards were held, the single version of the song featuring Ross and Usher was released on June 30, 2014, as the fifth official single from his sixth studio album X. The song peaked at number 27 on the US Billboard Hot 100 and number 10 in the United Kingdom.

== Music video ==
A music video for the song was released on August 14, 2014. Rapper Tyga makes a cameo appearance in the video.

The video starts with Brown standing in a white location wearing white clothing. The video then shows Brown standing in the front fire. Usher appears standing in a high large structure upon a pool with a girl wearing a red colored long dress. When the video comes to rapper Rick Ross, he's shirtless in a white room and sitting in a white chair. The music video ends with Brown and some dancers are dancing in the front of fire.

== Chart performance ==
The single peaked at number 27 on the US Billboard Hot 100 chart and spent a total of 22 weeks on the chart. It also peaked at number six on the US Hot R&B/Hip-Hop Songs chart and spent 26 weeks on the chart. On November 10, 2017, the single was certified double platinum by the Recording Industry Association of America (RIAA) for combined sales and streaming equivalent units of over two million copies in the United States.

In the United Kingdom, the song peaked at number ten on the UK Singles Chart and only spent seven weeks on the chart. The single was certified Silver by the British Phonographic Industry (BPI) for sales of over 200,000 copies in the UK.

== Track listing ==
Digital download

1. "New Flame" (featuring Usher and Rick Ross) – 4:04

Digital download (remix)

1. "New Flame" (Dave Audé Remix) (featuring Usher) – 6:17

== Charts ==
=== Weekly charts ===
Weekly chart performance for "New Flame"
Chart (2014–15)	Peak position
Australia (ARIA)	61
Belgium (Ultratip Bubbling Under Flanders)	29
Belgium Urban (Ultratop Flanders)	22
Belgium (Ultratip Bubbling Under Wallonia)	20
France (SNEP)	75
Germany (Deutsche Black Charts)	8
Netherlands (Single Tip)	8
New Zealand (Recorded Music NZ)	35
Russia (Airplay)	162
Scottish Singles Sales (Official Charts)	23
South Africa Airplay (EMA)	4
UK Singles (Official Charts)	10
UK Hip Hop/R&B (Official Charts)	2
US Billboard Hot 100	27
US Adult R&B Songs (Billboard)	20
US Hot R&B/Hip-Hop Songs (Billboard)	6
US R&B/Hip-Hop Airplay (Billboard)	1
US Pop Airplay (Billboard)	29
US Rhythmic Airplay (Billboard)	1

=== Year-end charts ===
2014 year-end chart performance for "New Flame"
Chart (2014)	Position
US Billboard Hot 100	77
US Hot R&B/Hip-Hop Songs (Billboard)	20
US Hot R&B/Hip-Hop Airplay (Billboard)	19
US Rhythmic (Billboard)	19

== Certifications ==
Certifications for "New Flame"
Region	Certification	Certified units/sales
Australia (ARIA)	Platinum	70,000^{‡}
New Zealand (RMNZ)	3× Platinum	90,000^{‡}
United Kingdom (BPI)	Gold	400,000^{‡}
United States (RIAA)	4× Platinum	4,000,000^{‡}
^{‡} Sales+streaming figures based on certification alone.
