= Nostálgico =

Single by Rvssian, Rauw Alejandro and Chris Brown
- Language: Spanish; English
- English title: "Nostalgic"
- Released: September 8, 2021
- Genre: Reggaeton; dancehall
- Length: 3:29
- Label: Sony Latin; Head Concussion
- Songwriters: Lionchild; Brown; Eric Bellinger; Ben Shapiro; Feli Ferraro; Richard McClashie; Teezio; Colla; Kenobi; Alejandro; Rvssian
- Producer: Rvssian

Rvssian singles chronology
"Pay for It" (2021)	"Nostálgico" (2021)	"You're the One I Love" (2021)

Rauw Alejandro singles chronology
"Cúrame" (2021)	"Nostálgico" (2021)	"Problemón" (2021)

Chris Brown singles chronology
"Woo Baby" (2021)	"Nostálgico" (2021)	"Get Back" (2021)

Music video
- "Nostálgico" on YouTube

"Nostálgico" (transl. "Nostalgic") is a song produced by Jamaican record producer Rvssian and recorded by Puerto Rican singer Rauw Alejandro and American singer Chris Brown. It was written by Lionchild, Brown, Eric Bellinger, Ben Shapiro, Feli Ferraro, Richard McClashie, Teezio, Colla, Kenobi, Alejandro, and Rvssian, while the production was handled by Rvssian. The song was released for digital download and streaming as a single by Sony Music Latin and Head Concussion Records on September 8, 2021. A primarily Spanish language R&B-infused reggaeton and dancehall song, it reminisces on a past relationship that the singers want back. The track received widely positive reviews from music critics, who complimented its Caribbean beats and the singers' exchange of verses.

"Nostálgico" was nominated for Crossover Collaboration of the Year at the 2023 Premio Lo Nuestro. The song was commercially successful, reaching the top five in Puerto Rico and Spain, as well as the top 10 in several other countries such as Dominican Republic and Peru, and on Billboard's Latin Airplay in the United States. It also peaked at number 11 on the US Billboard Hot Latin Songs chart. The song has received several certifications, including Latin quintuple platinum in the United States. An accompanying music video, released simultaneously with the song, was directed by Edgar Esteves and depicts the three musicians partying at a sensual house party.

== Background and release ==
Inspired by Chris Brown's musical style, Rauw Alejandro has been named the "Latin Chris Brown", due to the similarity of their music, style, and dance moves. The comparisons between the two artists made their fans anticipate a collaboration between them. Meanwhile, the media considered it Alejandro's "dream" collaboration. On September 5, 2021, Brown announced that they had collaborated on a song produced by Rvssian, and shared a snippet of it on his Instagram story. "Nostálgico" marks Brown's fourth collaboration on a Spanish language song, following "Algo Me Gusta de Ti" (2012), "Control" (2014) and "Just As I Am" (2017). The song was released for digital download and streaming by Sony Music Latin and Head Concussion Records on September 8, 2021, as a single.

== Music and lyrics ==
"Nostálgico"
A 20-second sample of the chorus, which mixes reggaeton with Caribbean beats and elements of electronic music.

Musically, "Nostálgico" is a primarily Spanish language R&B-infused reggaeton and dancehall song, with elements of electronic music and Caribbean beats. The song was written by Lionchild, Brown, Eric Bellinger, Ben Shapiro, Feli Ferraro, Richard McClashie, Teezio, Colla, Kenobi, Alejandro, and Rvssian, while its production was handled by Rvssian. The track runs for a total of 3 minutes and 29 seconds.

Lyrically, "Nostálgico" which translates to "Nostalgic" in English, includes both Spanish and English lyrics. On the song, the singers reminisce on a past relationship that they want back, trying to sweep their lovers off their feet. The lyrics include, "Aquella noche que volviste / Llorando me Convenciste / Que tu no quería hacerme daño / Hicimos el amor en el baño" ("That night that you came back / Crying you convinced me / That you didn't want to hurt me / We made love in the bathroom").

== Critical reception ==
Upon release, "Nostálgico" was met with widely positive reviews from music critics. In his review for DancehallMag, Donovan Watkis labeled the song "a late summer banger", while an author of HipHop-N-More called it "vibey". Lucas Villa from mitú named Alejandro and Brown a "twinkling duet" and described them as "magical, sexy, and irresistible". In 2022, Ernesto Lechner from Rolling Stone ranked the track as Alejandro's 41st-best song, saying it "echoes the profound imprint of Jamaica in its DNA", and praised "the exchange of verses" between the singers as "flawless".

=== Accolades ===
"Nostálgico" was nominated for Top Latin Crossover Song at the 2022 Premios Tu Música Urbano, Collaboration OMG at the 2022 Premios Juventud, and Crossover Collaboration of the Year at the 2023 Premio Lo Nuestro. The song was also acknowledged as an award-winning song at the 2023 ASCAP Latin Awards.

== Commercial performance ==
"Nostálgico" debuted at number 14 on the US Billboard Hot Latin Songs chart on September 25, 2021, becoming Rvssian's 5th entry, Alejandro's 24th, and Brown's 4th. On December 11, 2021, the track reached its peak of number 11. It also reached number six on the US Latin Digital Song Sales, number nine on Latin Airplay, number six on Latin Rhythm Airplay, and number two on Latin Pop Airplay charts. The song was certified quintuple platinum (Latin) by the Recording Industry Association of America (RIAA), for track-equivalent sales of over 300,000 units in the United States.

Besides the United States, "Desesperados" hit the charts in several European countries, including Portugal and Switzerland. In Spain's official weekly chart, the song debuted at number 13 on September 19, 2021. It subsequently peaked at number three on the chart for two consecutive weeks, becoming Rvssian's first top 10 hit in the country, Alejandro's twelfth, and Brown's second. The track was later certified quadruple platinum by the Productores de Música de España (PROMUSICAE), for track-equivalent sales of over 240,000 units in the country. In Latin America, "Nostálgico" experienced commercial success. It peaked in the top 10 of Dominican Republic, Panama, Peru, and Puerto Rico, and reached the top 20 in Costa Rica, Honduras, and Nicaragua. In Mexico, the song was certified platinum + gold by the Asociación Mexicana de Productores de Fonogramas y Videogramas (AMPROFON), for track-equivalent sales of over 210,000 units.

== Promotion ==
=== Music video ===
A screenshot from the music video, depicting Alejandro singing for a woman in a bathtub.

An accompanying music video was released simultaneously with the song. The visual was directed by Venezuelan director Edgar Esteves, and filmed on April 23, 2021. It depicts the three musicians partying at a sensual house party, as each of them dance along to the record. The video begins with Rvssian arriving with a girl and entering the house. In the next scenes, he flirts and spares with his lover. Alejandro starts singing for a woman in a bathtub, and then the scene switches as Brown begins singing his verses.

=== Live performances ===
"Nostálgico" was included on the set lists for Alejandro's the Rauw Alejandro World Tour, the Vice Versa Tour, and the Saturno World Tour.

== Track listing ==
Digital download / streaming
No.	Title	Length
1.	"Nostálgico"	3:29

== Credits and personnel ==
Credits adapted from Tidal.

- Rvssian – producer, composer, lyricist, performance arranger, recording engineer
- Rauw Alejandro – associated performer, composer, lyricist, producer
- Chris Brown – associated performer, composer, lyricist
- Rachael Kennedy "Lionchild" – composer, lyricist
- Eric Bellinger – composer, lyricist
- Ben Shapiro – composer, lyricist
- Feli Ferraro – composer, lyricist
- Richard McClashie – composer, lyricist
- Patrizio Pigliapoco "Teezio" – composer, lyricist
- José M. Collazo – composer, lyricist
- Jorge Pizarro "Kenobi" – composer, lyricist
- Nathalia Marshall "Lionchild" – composer, lyricist
- Lance Shipp "Lionchild" – composer, lyricist
- Tarik Johnston – composer, lyricist
- Amber Rubi Urena – A&R coordinator
- John Eddie Pérez Rios – A&R director
- Colin Leonard "Sing Mastering" – mastering engineer
- Mario Dunwell – maixing engineer
- Richard "M.R.I" McClashie – performance arranger

== Charts ==
=== Weekly charts ===
Weekly peak performance for "Nostálgico"
Chart (2021–2022)	Peak position
Argentina Hot 100 (Billboard)	48
Chile Songs (Billboard) (Note: The Hits of the World charts were launched in February 2022. Therefore, "Nostálgico" did not have a full run on the chart.)	22
Costa Rica (Monitor Latino)	17
Dominican Republic (Monitor Latino)	6
Honduras (Monitor Latino)	14
Global 200 (Billboard)	81
Netherlands (Single Tip)	21
New Zealand Hot Singles (RMNZ)	34
Nicaragua (Monitor Latino)	11
Panama (Monitor Latino)	8
Paraguay Urbano (Monitor Latino)	15
Peru (Monitor Latino)	18
Peru Songs (Billboard)	10
Peru Total Streams (UNIMPRO/BMAT)	3
Portugal (AFP)	159
Puerto Rico (Monitor Latino)	4
Spain (Promusicae)	3
Switzerland (Schweizer Hitparade)	69
US Bubbling Under Hot 100 (Billboard)	23
US Hot Latin Songs (Billboard)	11
US Latin Airplay (Billboard)	9
US Latin Pop Airplay (Billboard)	2
US Latin Rhythm Airplay (Billboard)	6
Venezuela Urbano (Monitor Latino)	12

=== Monthly charts ===
Monthly chart position for "Nostálgico"
Chart (2021–2022)	Peak position
Paraguay (SGP)	54

=== Year-end charts ===
2021 year-end chart performance for "Nostálgico"
Chart (2021)	Position
Dominican Republic (Monitor Latino)	97
Puerto Rico (Monitor Latino)	97
Spain (PROMUSICAE)	43
US Hot Latin Songs (Billboard)	94
Venezuela Urbano (Monitor Latino)	96

2022 year-end chart performance for "Nostálgico"
Chart (2022)	Position
Costa Rica (Monitor Latino)	66
Dominican Republic (Monitor Latino)	51
El Salvador Pop (Monitor Latino)	96
Guatemala Pop (Monitor Latino)	66
Honduras (Monitor Latino)	78
Nicaragua (Monitor Latino)	35
Panama (Monitor Latino)	17
Paraguay (Monitor Latino)	75
Peru Urbano (Monitor Latino)	71
Puerto Rico Urbano (Monitor Latino)	92
Spain (PROMUSICAE)	90
US Hot Latin Songs (Billboard)	50
US Latin Airplay (Billboard)	38
US Latin Pop Airplay (Billboard)	7
US Latin Rhythm Airplay (Billboard)	20
Venezuela Urbano (Monitor Latino)	56

2023 year-end chart performance for "Nostálgico"
Chart (2023)	Position
Panama (Monitor Latino)	98

== Certifications ==
Certifications and sales for "Nostálgico"
Region	Certification	Certified units/sales
Brazil (Pro-Música Brasil)	Gold	20,000^{‡}
Mexico (AMPROFON)	2× Platinum	280,000^{‡}
Spain (Promusicae)	4× Platinum	240,000^{‡}
United States (RIAA)	18× Platinum (Latin)	1,080,000^{‡}
^{‡} Sales+streaming figures based on certification alone.

== Release history ==
Release dates and formats for "Nostálgico"
Region	Date	Format(s)	Label	Ref.
Various	September 8, 2021	Digital download; streaming	Sony Music Latin; Head Concussion Records	
Latin America	September 10, 2021	Contemporary hit radio	Sony Music	
Italy	September 17, 2021	Contemporary hit radio	Sony Music	

== See also ==
- List of best-selling singles in Spain
