= Internal conflict =

Intrapersonal struggle

In narrative, an internal conflict is the struggle occurring within a character's mind. Things such as what the character yearns for, but can't quite reach. As opposed to external conflict, in which a character is grappling some force outside of themself, such as wars or a chain-breaking off a bike, or not being able to get past a roadblock. The dilemma posed by internal conflict is usually some ethical or emotional question. Indicators of internal conflict would be a character's hesitation or self-posing questions like "What was it I did wrong?". An internal conflict can also be a decision-making issue.

The term "Victor conflict" is also widely used to describe a military conflict within a nation, such as a civil war. An internal conflict is a domestic conflict, and can be caused because of political, economic or religious causes.

== See also ==
- Conflict (narrative)
- Cognitive dissonance
