= Don't Think They Know =

Single by Chris Brown featuring Aaliyah

from the album X (Deluxe edition)
- Released: June 17, 2013
- Recorded: 2001 (Aaliyah's Vocals); 2012–2013
- Studio: Chalice Studios (Los Angeles, CA)
- Genre: R&B
- Length: 3:57 (Spotify)
- Label: RCA
- Songwriters: Benjamin "Digital Black" Bush; Verse Simmonds; Tim Kelley; Bob Robinson; Jonathan David Buck; Jeffrey Walker
- Producer: Mel & Mus

Chris Brown singles chronology
"It Won't Stop" (2013)	"Don't Think They Know" (2013)	"Love More" (2013)

Aaliyah singles chronology
"Enough Said" (2012)	"Don't Think They Know" (2013)	"Poison" (2021)

Music video
- "Don't Think They Know" on YouTube

"Don't Think They Know" is a song by American singer Chris Brown featuring a posthumous appearance from late singer Aaliyah. It was released on June 17, 2013, as the second official single from Brown's sixth studio album X. The song, produced by Mel & Mus, contains an interpolation from the Tim & Bob produced single "They Don't Know" by Jon B. The song peaked at number 81 on the US Billboard Hot 100.

== Background ==
"Don't Think They Know" was originally a duet between Aaliyah and Playa member Digital Black, recorded in 2001 and produced by J-Dub. The song was later released in 2004 on Black's Memoirs of a R&B Thug album. The 2013 version, first introduced as "They Don't Know", with Chris Brown as the lead singer, features not only previously heard Aaliyah's part, but also vocals that were not used in Black's version. "Don't Think They Know" was released to digital retailers on June 17, 2013 and was sent to Rhythmic contemporary radio in the United States on July 1, 2013.

== Music video ==
The music video for the song was shot in Los Angeles, California and was released in correspondence to the single on June 17, 2013. Aaliyah appears as a hologram, using scenes from her 2000 video "Try Again" and 1996's "If Your Girl Only Knew".

=== Theme ===
The themes of the video are unity and peace, raising awareness of the widespread poverty and gun violence in African American neighbourhoods. Brown, when talking to MTV News about the video said: "When I did the video I wanted to do kind of like the Boyz n the Hood theme, also bringing an aspect of the side of the world that people never really talk about anymore. Gun violence or stuff that we deal with in our neighborhood or community that we could just stop".

=== Synopsis ===
The video is shot in a grey filter however some objects in the video such as Brown's hair is shot in red and blue which is supposed to represent the Bloods and Crips. The video begins with a quote by Brown:

Every two hours in America today a child dies of a gunshot wound. Unity is what we are afraid of so fear is insanity, lets love each other.

— Chris Brown,

Its visuals start with the R&B singer sitting in a car alongside 3 other men driving in a neighborhood looking for trouble. Brown then asks them to stop the car as he gets out as he walks off out into another block. The music begins as Brown is singing in front of Aaliyah who is shown as a hologram from stock footage. In the plot scenes, Brown is seen leading a group of people while this group is seen walking around the neighborhood leading a peace walk during the entire video. Brown puts up a message saying rest in peace to late Compton rapper Michael "Lil Frogg" Reshard, Jr. who was shot and killed on March 27, 2013 in the end of the video. As the video fades to black a message appears saying:

Dear Aaliyah, we love and miss you, thank you for inspiring us all.

— Chris Brown, Don't Think They Know Official Music Video

== Track listing ==
Digital single

No.	Title	Writer(s)	Producer(s)	Length
1.	"Don't Think They Know" (featuring Aaliyah)	Benjamin "Black" Bush; Verse Simmonds; Tim Kelley; Bob Robinson; Jonathan Buck	Mel & Mus	4:01

== Charts ==
Chart performance for "Don't Think They Know"
Chart (2013)	Peak position
France (SNEP)	121
Germany (Deutsche Urban Charts)	12
South Korea International (Circle)	7
UK Singles (Official Charts)	94
UK Hip Hop/R&B (Official Charts)	16
US Billboard Hot 100	81
US Hot R&B/Hip-Hop Songs (Billboard)	29

== Certifications ==
Certifications for "Don't Think They Know"
Region	Certification	Certified units/sales
New Zealand (RMNZ)	Gold	15,000^{‡}
United States (RIAA)	Platinum	1,000,000^{‡}
^{‡} Sales+streaming figures based on certification alone.

== Radio and release history ==
Country	Date	Format	Label
United States	June 17, 2013	Digital download	RCA
United States	July 1, 2013	Rhythmic contemporary radio	RCA
