= Fine China (Chris Brown song) =

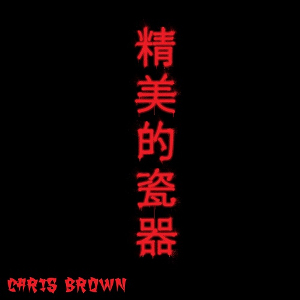

Single by Chris Brown

from the album X (Deluxe edition)
- Released: March 29, 2013
- Recorded: 2012
- Genre: Disco; R&B; synth-funk
- Length: 3:33
- Label: RCA
- Songwriters: Chris Brown; Eric Bellinger; Leon "Roccstar" Youngblood; Sevyn Streeter
- Producers: "Roccstar"; G'harah "PK" Degeddingseze

Chris Brown singles chronology
"As Your Friend" (2013)	"Fine China" (2013)	"For the Road" (2013)

Music video
- "Fine China" on YouTube

"Fine China" is a song by the American singer Chris Brown. It was the lead single from his sixth studio album, X, and was released on March 29, 2013, by RCA Records. It was written by Brown, Eric Bellinger, RoccStar and Sevyn Streeter, and produced by "RoccStar" and G'harah "PK" Degeddingseze. According to Brown and his producers, the song was inspired by the works of Michael Jackson, Stevie Wonder and Sam Cooke, among others.

The song received mainly positive reviews from music critics, who considered it "infectious and memorable", mainly for its "throwback style", also citing Justin Timberlake, and Jackson's Off the Wall album as clear references in the song. "Fine China" was a moderate success on the charts, reaching the top-40 in Australia, New Zealand, the UK and the US, where it reached a peak of number 31 on the Billboard Hot 100 chart. "Fine China"'s music video was released on April 1, 2013.

== Background and inspiration ==
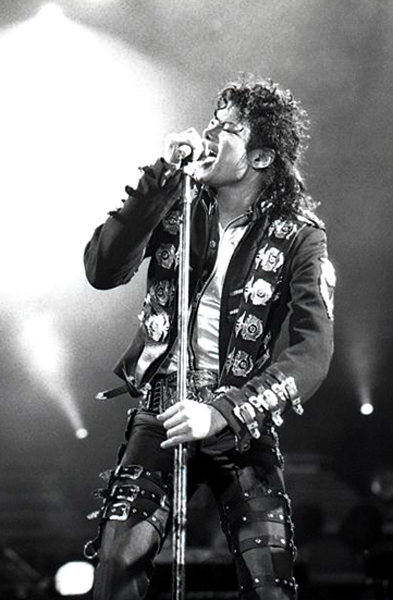
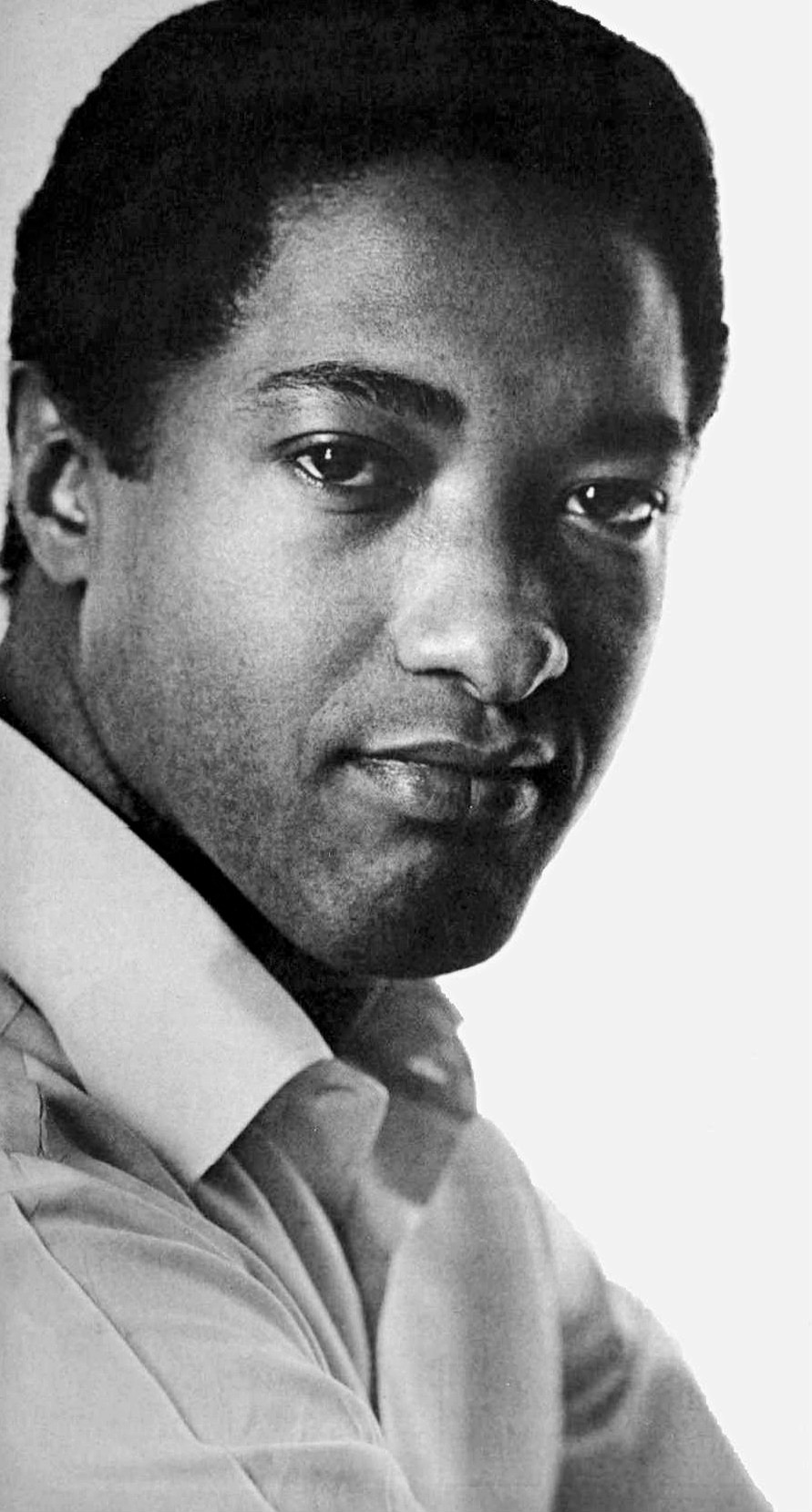
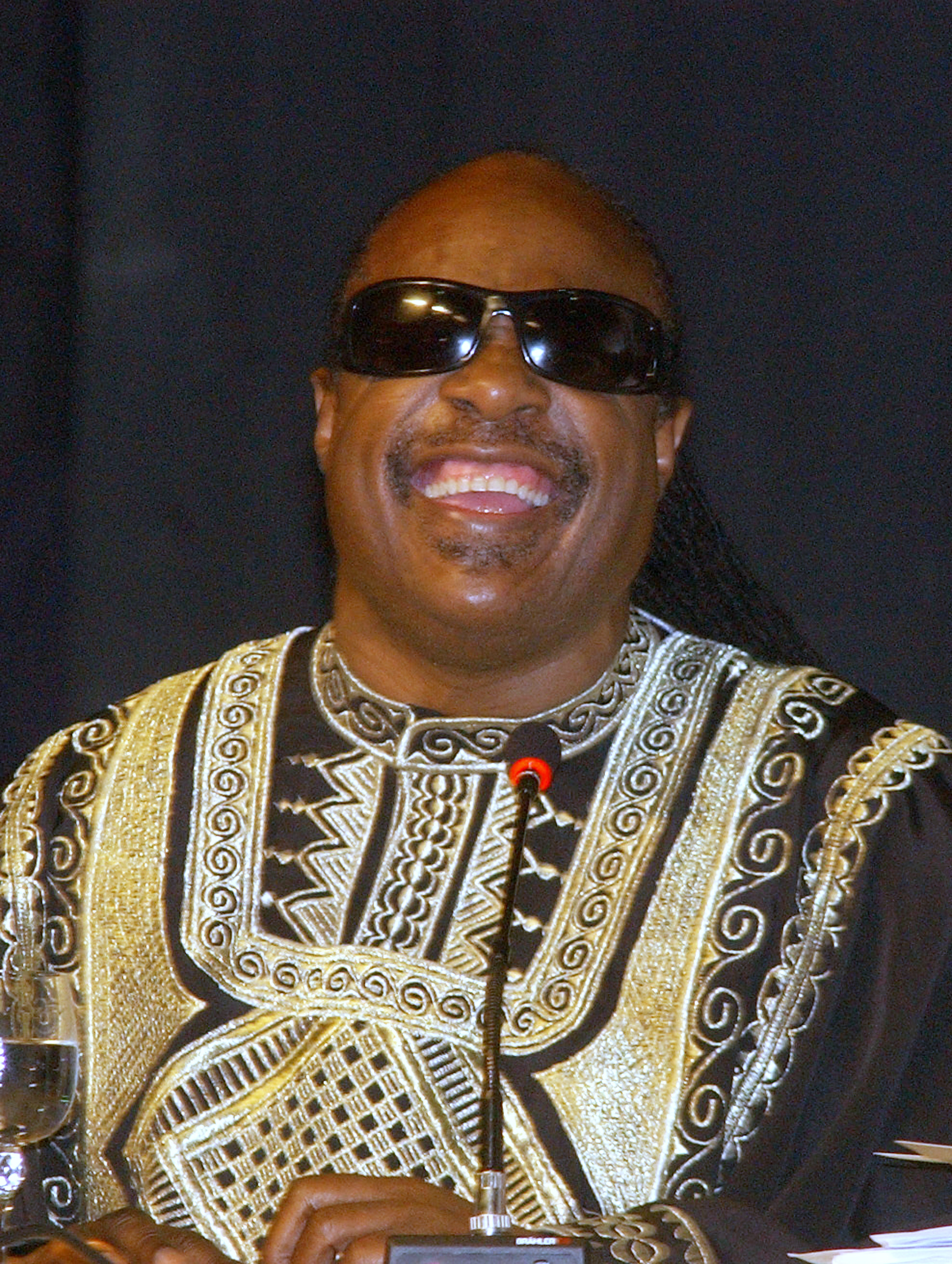
"Fine China" was built as an homage to Michael Jackson (left), Sam Cooke (center) and Stevie Wonder (right).

In February 2012, Chris Brown won his first career Grammy Award for Best R&B Album for his fourth studio album F.A.M.E. (2011), Eric Bellinger, who co-wrote "Say it With Me" for the album, thought, "Wow, I'm actually doing something here. I was doing something right because so many people get nominated and that's it; but to be a part of a project that actually won was the moment I realized I was in the right business." Bellinger also told Billboard that he stayed with Brown in the studio every day for about two months. Then, RoccStar and PK played the beat and he immediately thought about Michael Jackson. So they said, "Go in the booth and do some Michael-type stuff." In another interview, Bellinger said, "[Chris Brown] really, really went back to the days of Sam Cooke, but we were still able to keep it 2013 at the same time." Bellinger also cited Timberlake as another influence for the song and Brown's album X.

For one of the producers of the song, Roccstar, he was aiming for authentic music, saying that, "Seeing he's supposed to be the next MJ, it's kind of an automatic influence. I personally carry the Jackson sound a lot because I used to be around them so much. [...] With the bass line, I wasn't really thinking 'Let's make a Michael Jackson song,' I was just like 'let's make something that feels great.' Chris was like, 'We got to do some real shit this album. People need to feel exactly what I'm doing, it needs to be emotional and people need to be emotionally attached to this record,' so we just went in."

== Composition and lyrics ==
"I wanted to give a lot of live instrumentation, but still you can keep it in the club. It kinda gives you that nostalgic feeling of when Michael Jackson had 'Off the Wall' and Stevie Wonder in their prime. I grew up listening to different people – Donny Hathaways, Sam Cookes, Aretha Franklins. I take inspiration from all the greats."
—Brown talking about "Fine China" inspirations.

"Fine China" was written by Chris Brown, CBE artist Sevyn Streeter, Eric Bellinger and Roccstar, while production was handled by Roccstar and PK. It is an R&B song, with Brown singing "I'm not dangerous" in a vintage King-of-Pop falsetto over elastic bass and swinging Eighties funk grooves, according to Rolling Stone's Matt Diehl. According to Brown, the chorus ("It's alright/I'm not dangerous/If you're mine, I'll be generous/You're irreplaceable/A collectible, just like fine china") is about "how delicate, priceless and beautiful a girl can be." Lyrically, it uses fancy dinnerware as a metaphor for a delicate woman over a soulful, 1970's-inspired track. He also makes use of his falsetto, which soars over harmonies and a disco beat in the chorus. According to Amy Sciarretto of Pop Crush, "the shimmying song has a similar tempo to 'Billie Jean,' with '80s backbeats and plenty of Jacksonian 'Woo-hoos' and 'whoas' sprinkled throughout the song".

The song is performed in an E♭ minor key, with Brown's vocal ranging from E♭_{4} to D♭_{6}, and is set in common time at a tempo of 106 beats per minute. Brown released a remix which featured Common on May 7, 2013, with Common rapping about a special lady.

== Release and cover art ==
"Fine China" was released on iTunes by RCA Records on March 29, 2013, and sent to Rhythmic radio on April 2, 2013. It was sent to Urban radio on April 9, and Top 40/Mainstream radio on April 22, 2013. The single's album cover is simple, with the Mandarin characters 精美的瓷器 (jīngměi de cíqì) in red with Brown's name in the lower left corner in a faux-Asian-style font on a black background. It translates literally as "fine porcelain", or the "fine china" the song uses as a metaphor.

== Music video ==
"In this video, you'll see me taking care of the girl, doing gentlemanly things—showing another side of me. I know my female audience sees it. But the naysayers might say, 'No, that's not him."
—Brown talking about the video.

The official music video for "Fine China", inspired by Michael Jackson's "You Rock My World" short film, was filmed on March 12, 2013, in Los Angeles. The music video premiered on April 1, 2013. It was directed by Brown and Sylvain White, and shows Brown pursuing a relationship with an Asian woman despite her disapproving father (François Chau), a triad leader. While cruising around exotic CGI-assisted surroundings in a red Lamborghini, Brown sports a dapper look. A "Cor Sine Labe Doli" metallic gold bow tie, a black leather jacket, suspenders, a driving cap, pale grey gloves and white kicks make up the flashy yet urban-infused ensemble. Brown briefly introduces one other MJ-inspired look halfway through the video: a dark urban look made up of a checkered grey fedora, black slacks, button up shirt and a matching leather jacket.

=== Storyline ===
The video opens with a beautiful girl at war with her father, who does not wish for her to date Brown. Brown pulls up to her house in a car and she runs out to him, ready for a night on the town. It then diverges into a mix of "You Rock My World", "Smooth Criminal" and "Bad," hats, leather, studs, lights, dance into a club, fight with the mafia and all. Brown and his bros dance for his giggling lady love before an Asian gang shows up, first to a martial-arts-dance-battle, and then they're out for blood, with futuristic guns, more cars and the girl's father leading the charge. The mafia is met with Brown's gang outside, everybody's guns locked and stocked, and it ends with a "To Be Continued..." vibe.

=== Reception ===
Christina Lee of Idolator compared the video's plot to that of West Side Story and – among other critics – noted heavy influence by Michael Jackson. Kyle Anderson of Entertainment Weekly considered that the video may "borrow too much from Off the Wall era", while Rob Markman of MTV said it "takes distinct visual cues from classic clips like ... 'Smooth Criminal' and 'Beat It'", and Gregory DelliCarpini Jr. of Billboard compared Brown's "vintage" appearance to Jackson's appearance in the "Say Say Say" music video.

== Live performances ==
Brown performed "Fine China" at the 2013 Billboard Music Awards on May 20, 2013. The performance had Eastern-inspired design and plot machinations, with a mock fight sequence. Andrew Unterberger of Pop Dust was favorable to his performance, writing that, "To be fair, if there was one pop star in music right now who was born to deliver an on-stage karate dance performance, it was probably Breezy, and he acquits himself admirably in the mock-combat. And at least with this performance, he saves the super-physical stuff for the end, leaving him free to, y'know, actually sing during his proper performance–something of a novelty for Brown at award-show performances of late." He also performed the song during a medley at the 2013 BET Awards on June 30, 2013, alongside "Don't Think They Know". The performance started with Brown wearing a black skeleton outfit and flanked by dancers marked with bright yellow "X"s on their otherwise black and white ensembles, while performing "Fine China". Later, he strayed soon and slowed everything down with a candle and blacklit performance of "Don't Think They Know". Later, Nicki Minaj appeared suspended from the ceiling in a ball. She delivered a spitfire verse before the spotlight returned to Brown, who put his hood up sheepishly at the conclusion of the performance.

== Popular culture and covers ==
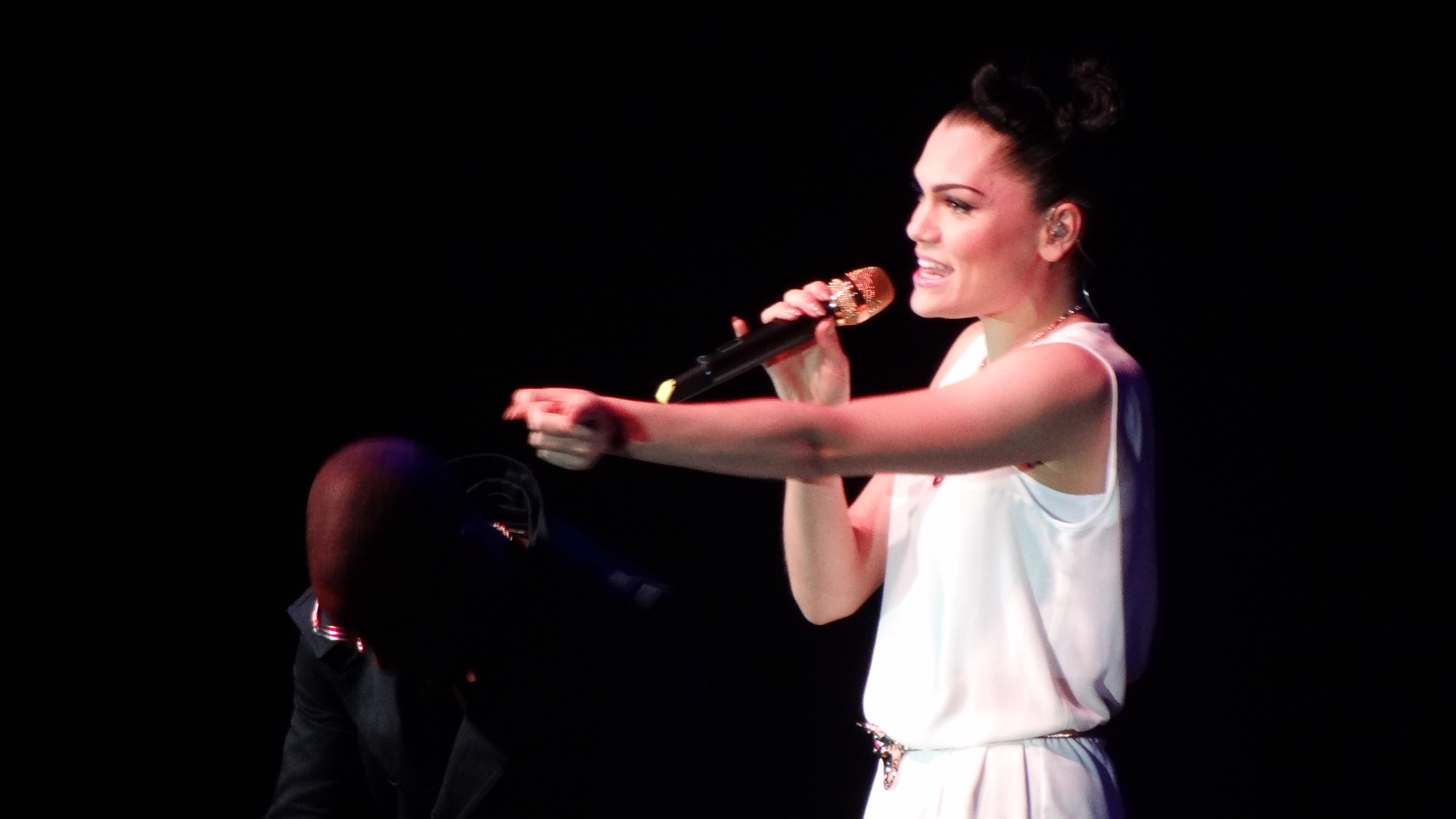
British singer Jessie J (pictured) covered the song.

It was announced that "Fine China" would be included in the videogame Just Dance 2014. It is also one of the select few songs available on Just Dance 2014's demo version. American actress, singer, dancer and writer Zendaya danced hip hop to the song in week nine of Dancing with the Stars with professional dance partner Val Chmerkovskiy and earned 30 out of 30 points.

British singer Jessie J covered the song, while performing an acoustic set for The Sun, with help from a few back-up vocalists and guitarists. Christina Lee of Idolator praised the cover, writing that, "the singer navigated the Michael Jackson-inspired melody with just a touch of her trademark sass. While Jessie and Breezy sound remarkably different, Jessie J understands pretty well how to treat a Chris Brown song." Brown himself praised her rendition, going to Twitter to say, "you're beyond incredible!".

"Fine China" was also performed by contestant "Kid The Wiz" on the season 8 of America's Got Talent, during the week of July 30–31.

X Factor UK 2014 Finalist Fleur East performed the song at her arena audition in Wembley Arena.

Common released his own remix to the song, adding a verse. Another remix to the single by MC McThriller was released on SoundCloud March 15, 2014.

== Critical reception ==
"Fine China" received mostly favorable reviews from music critics. In an early review for the song, Matt Diehl of Rolling Stone stated that, "It's a hype combination of futuristic and throwback, blended with decidedly old-school romance." Cortney Wills of MTV News called "Fine China", "an instantly infectious heartbreak song", adding, "The hard-hitting bass line carries Brown's aching voice through a mesmerizing melody." Yahoo! lauded "Fine China" as "a soulful, 1970's-inspired track" and said that it was "Brown's most musical sound to date", praising the song for being "a lush and infectious tune reminiscent of Michael Jackson's Off the Wall". In another positive review, Amy Sciarretto of Pop Crush gave the song 4 out of 5 stars, writing, "'Fine China' is a memorable R&B track with strings that borrows heavily from Michael Jackson and follows the same trajectory as Justin Timberlake's reinvention. That throwback sound is happening in the genre right now, and Breezy is paying his respects. [...] It's quite possible that this could be the song that changes the game for Breezy and allows people to focus on his music, instead of his past indiscretions." According to HotNewHipHop, "'Fine China' features smooth melodies and an irresistible groove that captures the essence of timeless R&B".

Kyle Anderson of Entertainment Weekly called it "a buzzy, bubbly bounce with yet another killer chorus". Robert Copsey of Digital Spy commented on the song's influences, writing that it has "Stevie Wonder-esque R&B beats and a light-yet-growly vocal not too dissimilar to Michael Jackson", ultimately calling it, "less a gracious nod and more like a well-polished tribute act". In a less favorable review, Will Hermes of Rolling Stone gave the song 2.5 out of 5 stars, calling it "generic, if well-built, R&B praise song to a woman, rocking a squishy, Daft Punk-y synth line and bright string arrangements, while the chorus centers on Brown declaring, 'I'm not dangerous' – a word choice he probably thought long and hard about, just as listeners will".

=== Awards ===
Year	Awards	Category	Work	Result
2013	MTV Video Music Awards	Best Choreography	Fine China	Nominated
2013	Soul Train Awards	Song of the Year	Fine China	Nominated
2013	Soul Train Awards	Best Dance Performance	Fine China	Nominated
2013	Soul Train Awards	Video of the Year	Fine China	Nominated
2013	World Music Awards	World's Best Song	Fine China	Nominated
2013	World Music Awards	World's Best Video	Fine China	Nominated

== Chart performance ==
After its release on April 2, 2013, "Fine China" entered on the US Billboard Hot 100at number 54, and rose to the top 40 during the week of May 16, giving Brown his 30th top 40 single on the chart. The song peaked at number 31, ion the week of June 8, 2013n. However, it was Brown's lowest charting lead-single since "Wall to Wall" peaked at number 79 in 2007. The song performed better on the Hot R&B/Hip-Hop Songs chart and on the US R&B Songs, peaking at number ten and three, respectively. On November 10, 2017, the single was certified platinum by the Recording Industry Association of America (RIAA) for combined sales and streaming equivalent units of a million units in the United States.

In the United Kingdom, the song reached the top-thirty, peaking at number 23 on the UK Singles Chart. On the ARIA Singles Chart, the song debuted and peaked at number 26. It has since been certified gold by the Australian Recording Industry Association (ARIA), denoting sales of 35,000 copies. In New Zealand, the song was a little better, debuting and peaking at number 21 on the RIANZ chart. In Belgium, the song proved to be more successful, reaching a peak of number ten, giving Brown his sixth top ten in the country.

== Track listing ==
Digital download
No.	Title	Length
1.	"Fine China"	3:33

== Credits and personnel ==
- Chris Brown – vocals, lyrics
- Leon Youngblood Jr. ("RoccStar") – lyrics, production
- G'harah "PK" Degeddingseze – production
- Eric Bellinger – lyrics
- Amber Streeter – lyrics

== Charts ==
=== Weekly charts ===
Weekly chart performance for "Fine China"
Chart (2013)	Peak position
Australia (ARIA)	26
Belgium (Ultratip Bubbling Under Flanders)	10
Belgium Urban (Ultratop Flanders)	17
Belgium (Ultratip Bubbling Under Wallonia)	7
Canada Hot 100 (Billboard)	71
France (SNEP)	43
Hungary (Rádiós Top 40)	25
Ireland (IRMA)	65
Japan Hot 100 (Billboard)	64
Netherlands (Dutch Top 40)	37
Netherlands (Single Top 100)	56
New Zealand (Recorded Music NZ)	21
Scottish Singles Sales (Official Charts)	32
Slovakia Airplay (ČNS IFPI)	22
South Africa (EMA)	3
UK Singles (Official Charts)	23
UK Hip Hop/R&B (Official Charts)	4
US Billboard Hot 100	31
US Adult R&B Songs (Billboard)	16
US Hot R&B/Hip-Hop Songs (Billboard)	10
US R&B/Hip-Hop Airplay (Billboard)	8
US Pop Airplay (Billboard)	29
US Rhythmic Airplay (Billboard)	5

=== Year-end charts ===
2013 year-end chart performance for "Fine China"
Chart (2013)	Position
UK Singles (Official Charts Company)	193
US Hot R&B/Hip-Hop Songs (Billboard)	33
US Rhythmic (Billboard)	38

== Certifications ==
Certifications for "Fine China"
Region	Certification	Certified units/sales
Australia (ARIA)	Platinum	70,000^{^}
New Zealand (RMNZ)	Platinum	30,000^{‡}
United Kingdom (BPI)	Silver	200,000^{‡}
United States (RIAA)	Platinum	1,000,000^{‡}
^{^} Shipments figures based on certification alone.^{‡} Sales+streaming figures based on certification alone.

== Release history ==
Region	Date	Format	Label	Ref.
Various	March 29, 2013	Digital download	RCA Records	
United States	March 29, 2013	Rhythmic contemporary	RCA Records	
United States	April 9, 2013	Urban contemporary	RCA Records	
United States	April 23, 2013	Contemporary hit radio	RCA Records	
