= The R&B Tour =

2026 concert tour by Usher & Chris Brown

- North American tour by Chris Brown & Usher
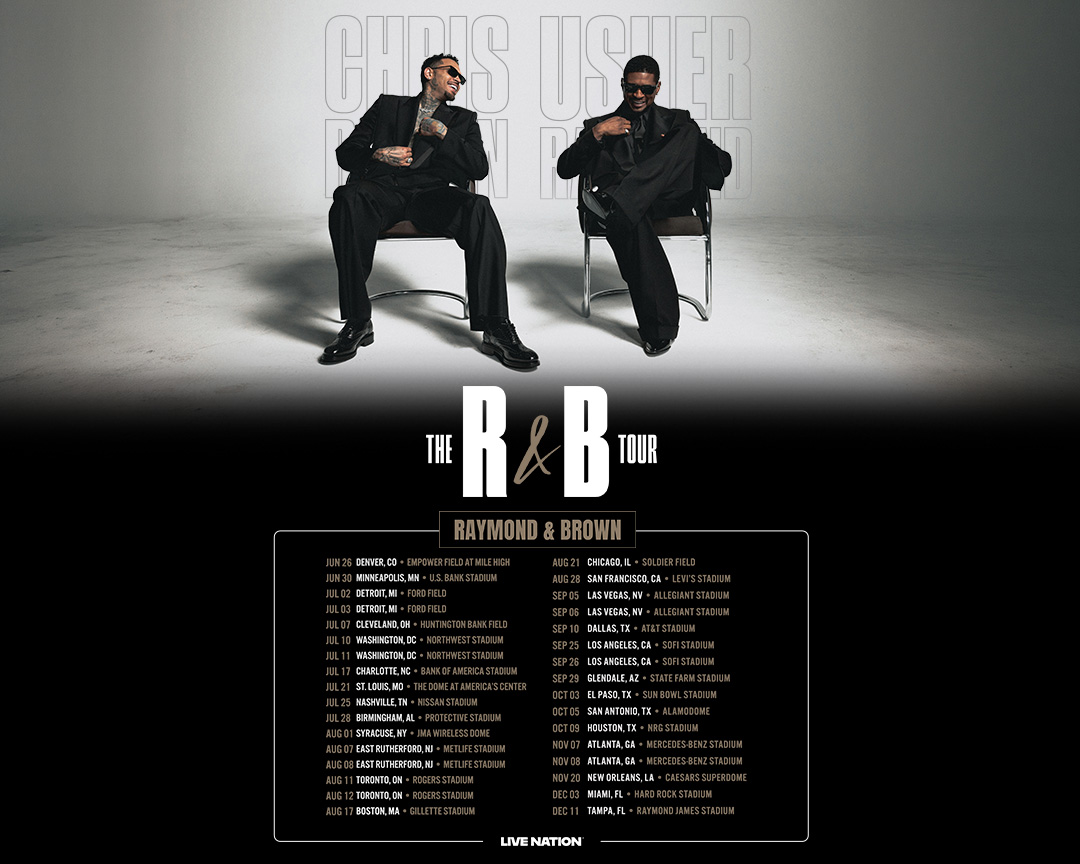
- Official poster
- Associated albums: Brown (Note: No new music by Usher was supported by this tour)
- Start date: June 26, 2026
- End date: December 12, 2026
- No. of shows: 53
- Supporting acts: Tank; Mario; Eric Bellinger
- Box office: $280 million (Note: Tour gross as of October 2026.)

Chris Brown concert chronology
- Breezy Bowl XX (2025); The R&B Tour (2026)
Usher tour chronology
Usher: Past Present Future (2024-25)	The R&B Tour (2026)

The R&B Tour (also known as the Raymond & Brown Tour) is the ongoing co-headlining concert tour by American singers Chris Brown and Usher. The tour marks Brown's second consecutive headlining stadium tour, Usher's first headlining stadium tour, and the first joint concert tour between the two artists.

The tour began on June 26, 2026, in Denver and is scheduled to conclude on December 12, 2026, in Tampa. Tank, Eric Bellinger, and Mario serve as intermission acts.

Originally announced as a 33-date stadium tour, strong ticket demand led to multiple expansions, ultimately reaching 59 shows across 26 stadiums in the United States and Canada. However, six tour dates scheduled in October and November were later cancelled.

== Announcement ==
On April 10, 2026, Chris Brown and Usher announced The R&B Tour through a joint social media post accompanied by a cinematic teaser video. In the video, the two artists are shown riding motorcycles through a city before arriving at a stadium, where Usher declares “It’s time” and Brown responds “Hell yeah.” The caption simply read “ITS TIME! #R&BTOUR #Raymond&Brown.”

On April 14, Live Nation revealed the full initial itinerary of 33 stadium dates across the United States and Canada, beginning on June 26, 2026, in Denver and concluding on December 11 in Tampa.

Due to strong demand, additional shows were announced in late April, expanding the tour. Further dates continued to be added throughout the spring. On August 17, 2026, eight more stadium dates were announced (including first-time stops in Baltimore, Cincinnati, Columbia, and Indianapolis), bringing the total to 59 shows.

=== Supporting acts ===
Mario and Eric Bellinger joined the tour early on (with Mario officially confirming his involvement for the full run in early July), while Tank later became part of the production alongside them. The trio, known as The Midnight Saints, serves as backing vocalists and performs its own segment.

=== Special guests ===
The tour featured appearances by numerous guest performers. On July 21, Nelly appeared during the concert at The Dome at America's Center in St. Louis. The August 7 and 8 concerts at MetLife Stadium in East Rutherford, New Jersey, featured 50 Cent, Tony Yayo, Uncle Murda, Jadakiss, Fat Joe, Lil Baby, A Boogie wit da Hoodie, Mary J. Blige, Method Man, Future and Ashanti. Further appearances included E-40 at Levi's Stadium in Santa Clara, California, on August 30, and Kanye West at SoFi Stadium in Inglewood, California, on September 25. The following night's concert featured Snoop Dogg, Robin Thicke and Brandy.

The October 9 and 10 concerts at NRG Stadium in Houston featured Bun B, Slim Thug and Don Toliver. The October 15 concert at MetLife Stadium included appearances by Shyne, Fabolous and Meek Mill.

The five November concerts at Mercedes-Benz Stadium in Atlanta also featured a large number of guests. The November 5 show included T.I. and Young Dro, while the following night featured Bow Wow, Muni Long, Jermaine Dupri, Tyrese, Monica, Xscape, Dru Hill, Da Brat and YoungBloodZ. On November 8, appearances included Summer Walker, Sexyy Red, Jeezy, Lloyd, Ne-Yo and Keith Sweat. The November 10 concert featured Chaka Khan, Amerie, Mariah the Scientist, Latto, Keri Hilson and Gunna. The following night's show included 2 Chainz, Ludacris, 21 Savage and Belly Gang Kushington.

The November 15 concert at SoFi Stadium featured Bobby Brown and Earth, Wind & Fire.

== Show format and production ==
The show was divided into nine acts and featured a setlist of more than 50 songs, with Chris Brown and Usher alternating performances throughout the concert. Joint performances included the opening song "Party", the closing "New Flame", and the remixes of "Back to Sleep" and "It Depends".

The production featured a diamond-shaped stage extending into the audience, as well as additional platforms. The performances featured complex choreography by both performers and a crew of dancers, as well as pole dancers, breakdancers and flame twirlers. Both singers brought female audience members onstage for serenades, while Brown flew above the crowd on a harness while singing "Ayo".

=== Usher's fan onstage controversy ===
During the tour's Nashville stop on July 25, 2026, Usher invited a female fan onstage for the show's customary serenade, but her visibly uncomfortable reaction prompted him to remove her from the stage. The video of the moment generated significant online discussion. She later explained that, although she had agreed to come onstage, she had hoped to be serenaded by Chris Brown rather than Usher. On November 8, Brown invited the same fan onstage during the Atlanta stop, serenading her with "Take You Down" in a moment widely interpreted as a playful response to the earlier incident.

== Set list ==
This set list is from the June 26, 2026, concert in Denver. It does not represent all concerts for the duration of the tour.

Act I (Brown & Usher)

1. "Party"

Act II (Usher only)

2. "Yeah!"
3. "Caught Up"
4. "U Don't Have to Call"
5. "Love in This Club"
6. "Bad Girl"

Act III (Brown only)

7. "Poppin'"
8. "Wall to Wall"
9. "Deuces"
10. "Loyal"
11. "Go Crazy"
12. "Look at Me Now"
13. "For the Moment"
14. "Run It!"

Act IV (Usher only)

15. "Superstar" (teaser intro)
16. "U Remind Me"
17. "My Way"
18. "U Make Me Wanna"
19. "My Boo"
20. "Trading Places"
21. "Lovers & Friends"
22. "Burn"

Act V (Brown only)

23. "Residuals"
24. "It's Not You It's Me"
25. "Fallin' (with Mario and Eric Bellinger)
26. "Heat"
27. "WE (Warm Embrace)"
28. "Something in the Water"
29. "Privacy"
30. "Yo (Excuse Me Miss)"
31. "Ain't No Way (You Won't Love Me)"
32. "Say Goodbye"
33. "Don't Judge Me"
34. "She Ain't You"

Act VI (Brown & Usher)

35. "Under the Influence"
36. "Seduction"
37. "Back to Sleep" (Remix)
38. "Feel Something"
39. "Nice & Slow"
40. "It Depends" (Remix)
41. "There Goes My Baby"
42. "Wet the Bed"
43. "Take You Down"

Act VII

Eric Bellinger's Set

- "G.O.A.T."
- "Drive By"

Mario's Set

- "Just a Friend 2002"
- "Crying Out for Me"
- "Let Me Love You"

Tank's Set

- "When We"
- "Please Don't Go"

DJ Break

Act VIII (Usher only)

44. "OMG"
45. "Good Kisser"
46. "No Limit"
47. "Climax"
48. "Confessions, Pt. II"
49. "Superstar"

Act IX (Brown only)

50. "Ayo"
51. "Obvious"
52. "Kiss Kiss"
53. "With You"
54. "Forever"
55. "No Guidance"

Act X: Encore (Brown & Usher)

56. "New Flame"

== Tour dates ==
List of 2026 concerts
Date (2026)	City	Country	Venue	Opening acts	Attendance	Revenue
June 26	Denver	United States	Empower Field at Mile High	Mario; Eric Bellinger	50,276 / 50,276	—
June 30	Minneapolis	United States	U.S. Bank Stadium	Mario; Eric Bellinger	—	—
July 2	Detroit	United States	Ford Field	Mario; Eric Bellinger	—	—
July 3	Detroit	United States	Ford Field	Mario; Eric Bellinger	—	—
July 5	Detroit	United States	Ford Field	Mario; Eric Bellinger	—	—
July 7	Cleveland	United States	Huntington Bank Field	Mario; Eric Bellinger	—	—
July 10	Landover (Note: Promoted as Washington, D.C.)	United States	Northwest Stadium	Mario; Eric Bellinger	—	—
July 11	Landover	United States	Northwest Stadium	Mario; Eric Bellinger	—	—
July 13	Landover	United States	Northwest Stadium	Mario; Eric Bellinger	—	—
July 17	Charlotte	United States	Bank of America Stadium	Mario; Eric Bellinger	—	—
July 18	Charlotte	United States	Bank of America Stadium	Mario; Eric Bellinger	—	—
July 21	St. Louis	United States	The Dome at America's Center	Mario; Eric Bellinger	—	—
July 25	Nashville	United States	Nissan Stadium	Mario; Eric Bellinger	—	—
July 28	Birmingham	United States	Protective Stadium	Mario; Eric Bellinger	—	—
July 29	Birmingham	United States	Protective Stadium	Mario; Eric Bellinger	—	—
August 1	Syracuse	United States	JMA Wireless Dome	Tank; Mario; Eric Bellinger	—	—
August 7	East Rutherford	United States	MetLife Stadium	Tank; Mario; Eric Bellinger	—	—
August 8	East Rutherford	United States	MetLife Stadium	Tank; Mario; Eric Bellinger	—	—
August 11	Toronto	Canada	Rogers Stadium	Tank; Mario; Eric Bellinger	—	—
August 12	Toronto	Canada	Rogers Stadium	Tank; Mario; Eric Bellinger	—	—
August 17	Foxborough (Note: Promoted as Boston)	United States	Gillette Stadium	Tank; Mario; Eric Bellinger	—	—
August 21	Chicago	United States	Soldier Field	Tank; Mario; Eric Bellinger	—	—
August 22	Chicago	United States	Soldier Field	Tank; Mario; Eric Bellinger	—	—
August 28	Santa Clara (Note: Promoted as San Francisco)	United States	Levi's Stadium	Tank; Mario; Eric Bellinger	—	—
August 29	Santa Clara	United States	Levi's Stadium	Tank; Mario; Eric Bellinger	—	—
September 1	Santa Clara	United States	Levi's Stadium	Tank; Mario; Eric Bellinger	—	—
September 5	Paradise (Note: Promoted as Las Vegas)	United States	Allegiant Stadium	Tank; Mario; Eric Bellinger	—	—
September 6	Paradise	United States	Allegiant Stadium	Tank; Mario; Eric Bellinger	—	—
September 10	Arlington (Note: Promoted as Dallas)	United States	AT&T Stadium	Tank; Mario; Eric Bellinger	—	—
September 12	Arlington	United States	AT&T Stadium	Tank; Mario; Eric Bellinger	—	—
September 13	Arlington	United States	AT&T Stadium	Tank; Mario; Eric Bellinger	—	—
September 18	Paradise	United States	Allegiant Stadium	Tank; Mario; Eric Bellinger	—	—
September 25	Inglewood (Note: Promoted as Los Angeles)	United States	SoFi Stadium	Tank; Mario; Eric Bellinger	—	—
September 26	Inglewood	United States	SoFi Stadium	Tank; Mario; Eric Bellinger	—	—
September 29	Glendale	United States	State Farm Stadium	Tank; Mario; Eric Bellinger	—	—
October 3	El Paso	United States	Sun Bowl Stadium	Tank; Mario; Eric Bellinger	—	—
October 5	San Antonio	United States	Alamodome	Tank; Mario; Eric Bellinger	—	—
October 9	Houston	United States	NRG Stadium	Tank; Mario; Eric Bellinger	—	—
October 10	Houston	United States	NRG Stadium	Tank; Mario; Eric Bellinger	—	—
October 15	East Rutherford	United States	MetLife Stadium	Tank; Mario; Eric Bellinger	—	—
November 5	Atlanta	United States	Mercedes-Benz Stadium	Tank; Mario; Eric Bellinger	—	—
November 6	Atlanta	United States	Mercedes-Benz Stadium	Tank; Mario; Eric Bellinger	—	—
November 8	Atlanta	United States	Mercedes-Benz Stadium	Tank; Mario; Eric Bellinger	—	—
November 10	Atlanta	United States	Mercedes-Benz Stadium	Tank; Mario; Eric Bellinger	—	—
November 11	Atlanta	United States	Mercedes-Benz Stadium	Tank; Mario; Eric Bellinger	—	—
November 15	Inglewood	United States	SoFi Stadium	Tank; Mario; Eric Bellinger	—	—
November 20	New Orleans	United States	Caesars Superdome	Tank; Mario; Eric Bellinger	—	—
November 21	New Orleans	United States	Caesars Superdome	Tank; Mario; Eric Bellinger	—	—
November 24	Houston	United States	NRG Stadium	Tank; Mario; Eric Bellinger	—	—
December 3	Miami Gardens (Note: Promoted as Miami)	United States	Hard Rock Stadium	Tank; Mario; Eric Bellinger	—	—
December 5	Miami Gardens	United States	Hard Rock Stadium	Tank; Mario; Eric Bellinger	—	—
December 11	Tampa	United States	Raymond James Stadium	Tank; Mario; Eric Bellinger	—	—
December 12	Tampa	United States	Raymond James Stadium	Tank; Mario; Eric Bellinger	—	—

=== Canceled dates ===
Date	City	Country	Venue	Reason
October 17	Baltimore	United States	M&T Bank Stadium	Brown's London sentencing
October 24	Cincinnati	United States	Paycor Stadium	Brown's London sentencing
October 29	Columbia	United States	Williams–Brice Stadium	Brown's London sentencing
October 31	Indianapolis	United States	Lucas Oil Stadium	Brown's London sentencing
November 16	Inglewood	United States	SoFi Stadium	Unknown reason
December 6	Miami Gardens	United States	Hard Rock Stadium	Unknown reason

== See also ==
- List of Billboard Boxscore number-one concert series of the 2020s
