= Obvious (Chris Brown song) =

2026 single by Chris Brown

Single by Chris Brown

from the album Brown
- Released: April 10, 2026
- Recorded: 2025
- Genre: R&B
- Length: 3:07
- Label: CBE; RCA
- Songwriters: Chris Brown; RoccStar; DSTRK; Tyler Jordan; Major Myjah; Amrita Sen
- Producer: RoccStar

Chris Brown singles chronology
"WGFT (Remix)" (2026)	"Obvious" (2026)	"Fallin'" (2026)

Music video
- "Obvious" on YouTube

"Obvious" is a song by American singer Chris Brown, released on April 10, 2026, as the third single from his twelfth studio album, titled Brown. An R&B track about the obvious sexual tension between two prospective lovers, it was produced by RoccStar. The song was first previewed during Brown’s club appearances while on the road for his Breezy Bowl XX Tour in 2025, and follows his 2025 singles "Holy Blindfold" and "It Depends".

== Background and release ==
The song was first previewed during the summer and later in 2025 at Brown’s club appearances following his Breezy Bowl XX tour dates, including stops at District 8 in Tampa, Florida, and in Detroit, Michigan.

Brown later hinted that another announcement was coming on Friday (April 10), posting on Instagram Stories: “I still got sum to tell yall Friday!!!” accompanied by smirking and laughing emojis. On the day of the song’s release, it was also revealed that his album, Brown, was scheduled for May 8, 2026. He confirmed the announcement in an Instagram post at midnight on Friday, writing: “It's obvious I'm tryna start the summer up! May 8th #BROWNALBUM,” he told his 143 million followers. The release of the song also coincided with the announcement of Brown’s joint tour with Usher, titled “The Raymond & Brown Tour”.

== Composition ==
“Obvious” is an R&B mid-tempo that HotNewHipHop described for having "lots of pop appeal". The track explores "an undeniable chemistry" between two prospective lovers, with Brown expressing a relationship defined by sexual attraction and mutual desire; he uses a metaphor related to a fountain (“Let’s stay in the house, I’ma drink from your fountain”) in the first verse, before singing about spoiling her in the second. The song opens with the use of a talk box.

== Critical reception ==
Billboard ranked the track among the highlights on Brown, describing it as “a true earworm” and praising its “catchy chorus”, “immaculate production” and Brown’s “high-level vocal performance”, concluding that it “could be a Chris Brown song that we discuss for years to come.” Essence highlighted the song as one of the standout releases of the week.

== Charts ==
Weekly chart performance for "Obvious"
Chart (2026)	Peak position
New Zealand Hot Singles (RMNZ)	3
Nigeria Bubbling Under Hot 100 (TurnTable)	7
Nigeria Airplay (TurnTable)	71
South Africa Streaming (TOSAC)	56
UK Singles (Official Charts)	87
US Billboard Hot 100	57
US Hot R&B/Hip-Hop Songs (Billboard)	13
US R&B/Hip-Hop Airplay (Billboard)	7
US Rhythmic Airplay (Billboard)	1
