= Brown (Chris Brown album) =

Studio album by Chris Brown
- Released: May 8, 2026
- Genre: R&B
- Length: 92:05
- Labels: RCA; CBE
- Producers: 8een; ADP; Aye YB; Nico Baran; Miles Barker; Jonathan Bellion; Bigg D; Jesse Blocker III; Paul Cabbin; CashMoneyAP; Chrishan; Kevin Cossom; Drew80HD; Ebby; Fraka; Fresh; Jamal Gaines; Sondre Haftorsen; John Hajek; Clifton Haralson; Hitmaka; Hossy; Juberlee; Kabeh; Keyflo; Kofo; Kyduh; Lamb; Benjamin Lasnier; Layrz; Lee Major; Lou Xtwo; Metro Boomin; Sean Momberger; The Monsters & Strangerz; Daniel Moras; Antonio Moses; Murphykid; Music Major; Osa; Ryan Press; Q-Beatz; RiotUSA; RoccStar; RockBoyBeats; Gabriel Roland; Kristian Rosendal; Hunter Sallis; Alan Sampson; Skeez; SkipOnDaBeat; SprngBrk; Tay Keith; TenRoc; Troy Taylor U the Goat; TSB; T-Town; The Underdogs; Dashon Vincent; Ken Will; WillOnnaBeat; Jirou Williams; Wlcm; Xris Keys

Chris Brown chronology
11:11 (2023)	Brown (2026)

Singles from Brown
- 1. "Holy Blindfold" Released: June 13, 2025; 2. "It Depends" Released: July 25, 2025; 3. "Obvious" Released: April 10, 2026; 4. "Fallin'" Released: May 1, 2026

Brown (stylized in all caps and a backronym of Break Rules Only When Necessary) is the twelfth studio album by American singer-songwriter Chris Brown. It was released on May 8, 2026, by RCA Records and CBE. The album features guest appearances from fellow singer-songwriters Bryson Tiller, Fridayy, Leon Thomas, Lucky Daye, Tank, and Vybz Kartel, alongside guest contributions from American rappers GloRilla, Sexyy Red, and YoungBoy Never Broke Again. Production on the album was handled by RoccStar, Chrishan, The Underdogs, Metro Boomin, Tay Keith, and Troy Taylor, among others. The deluxe edition, titled “Brown: The Chocolate Edition”, was released on June 19, 2026, featuring guest appearances from WizKid, Ty Dolla Sign, and longtime collaborator Tyga.

Four singles preceded the album's release: "Holy Blindfold", "It Depends", "Obvious", and "Fallin'".

Musically, Brown is an R&B album that incorporates a diverse range of influences while maintaining a core R&B sound. The lyrical content explores themes of sexual desire, romantic love, resilience and introspection. The album cover artwork features the singer in a pose that was interpreted as an homage to old-school R&B artists.

Brown debuted at number seven on the US Billboard 200, making it his thirteenth consecutive top-ten album in the country. It received mixed to negative reviews from music critics. To support the album, Brown toured with Usher on The R&B Tour.

== Background ==
The album's title, Brown, is a backronym for "Break Rules Only When Necessary", is similar to the naming concept he used for his fourth studio album, F.A.M.E. (2011).

== Composition ==
Brown is primarily an R&B album with 27 tracks. Throughout the album, some songs incorporate elements of gospel, trap and drill within an R&B-centered sound, while a few tracks feature the singer taking stylistically different directions such as alternative rock or hip-hop. Lyrically, Brown features themes of sexual desire, romantic love, hedonistic confidence, resilience, introspection, and public scrutiny. Across the project, Brown’s vocal performances are characterized by melisma, layered harmonies, and cadence shifts, with occasional rap-inflected delivery and atmospheric use of reverb on vocals.

== Songs ==
The opening track, "Leave Me Alone", was co-produced by Metro Boomin to incorporate changes of beat. The track, "Obvious", starts with a talk box and talks about the sexual tension between two prospective lovers. "Honey Pack" refers to sexual enhancement using honey packets, while "It Depends", featuring Bryson Tiller, blends R&B with Bronx drill elements. Brown's female fans responded well to the song in concert.

"Fallin'", featuring Leon Thomas, is a blues track about being stuck in a cycle of love that the performers cannot shake. "Hate Me" is a gospel-influenced power ballad in which Brown asks a former lover to hate him if it aids her healing process, even stating, "That's probably what I deserve." The track has been interpreted as referencing his relationship with Rihanna, and how Brown assumed the role of victim after he violently assaulted her and was subsequently condemned by the media. "Call Your Name" is based on Three 6 Mafia’s 1999 track "Nine to Yo Dome", then it transitions into club trap production for the rap verses by Sexyy Red and GloRilla.

"For the Moment" is an alternative rock track that Billboard described as featuring "vocal filtering in the hook and synths" that suggest Brown "may have been listening to a bunch of old-school alternative bands". "Fuck and Party", featuring Vybz Kartel, blends R&B, reggae, and pop elements, with Brown adopting a patois-influenced vocal delivery. "Red Rum" features NBA YoungBoy in a "jarring change of pace", according to Billboard. "It's Not You It's Me" shifts into more introspective and romantic R&B, reminiscent of Brown's early work. "Cry for Me" and "Say Nothin'" are R&B tracks. The former was described by Billboard as having "energy to it" though it fails to measure up to his other songs, while the latter for its vivid sexual storytelling: "it didn't just tell us what was going on, but he created specific imagery to bring us right into his car where a nasty time is going on." "Slow Jamz", featuring Lucky Daye, is a slow-jam duet showing the vocal chemistry between Brown and Daye. "Perfect Timing", featuring Fridayy, left Billboard wishing Fridayy had tried harder.

"In My Head" is a romantic R&B track is about savoring the feeling of intimacy after the lover leaves the bed. The song "What's Love" tells about the frustration of not being sure about one's lover. "Colours" was "undercooked" per Billboard. "Theme Song" was written for women, perhaps with social media outlets in mind. "It's Personal" is an "R&B thug cut" that confronts Browns critics, challenging them to "keep that same energy". "Holy Blindfold" was described by Genius as "spiritual and uplifiting" but Billboard found it "half-baked" and "unfulfilling". The closing track, "Present", is about rising above hate and criticism to focus on someone he cares about.

== Artwork ==
The album's artwork was unveiled by Chris Brown on April 29, 2026, via social media. It depicts Brown lying on his side while wearing a tan suit and matching fedora, a pose that drew widespread comparisons to the cover of Thriller (1982) by Michael Jackson. The imagery was widely interpreted as an homage to Jackson and other old-school R&B artists who have used similar reclining poses in their album artwork, including Teddy Pendergrass, Luther Vandross, and Lionel Richie. Following its reveal, the cover generated significant online discussion. The artwork also shares some similarly to his debut 2005 self-titled studio album, Chris Brown.

== Release and promotion ==
To support the album, Brown will co-headline the stadium tour “The R&B Tour” alongside singer Usher. In 2025, Brown teased the album on several occasions, including sharing its title on social media and previewing snippets of the songs—"Call Your Name" and "Obvious"—throughout its club appearances, while on the road for his Breezy Bowl XX Stadium Tour. In April 2026, the singer officially announced Brown, confirming its release date of May 8, via social media alongside the album's cover artwork. The announcement came shortly after the release of "Obvious", which served as one of the lead singles from the album. The album's rollout coincided with the announcement of a co-headlining stadium tour with Usher, titled "The R&B Tour", scheduled to begin in June 2026. The tour was positioned as a major promotional effort supporting the album's release. On May 5, Brown revealed the feature lineup through a vintage black-and-white trailer that presented the guest artists as classic R&B-style performers in a fictional "A Night of Soul" show at the "House of Brown", including YoungBoy Never Broke Again, Vybz Kartel, GloRilla, Bryson Tiller, Sexyy Red, Leon Thomas, Tank, Fridayy, and Lucky Daye. On May 6, Brown revealed the full tracklist for the album.

Brown was released digitally on May 8, 2026. On the same day, the music video for "For the Moment" was also released.

On May 20, Brown hinted at the deluxe version of the album on his Instagram account.On June 3, he announced the deluxe edition will be called "Brown: The Chocolate Edition" and was released on June 19, 2026.

== Singles ==
The album's lead single, "Holy Blindfold", was released on June 13, 2025. The song blends elements of pop and gospel with R&B. It was released following Brown's release from police custody in Manchester, England. The song's music video was released on July 30, 2025, just days after his Breezy Bowl XX tour began in the United States. The song peaked at number 89 on the Billboard Hot 100 and number 21 on the Hot R&B/Hip-Hop Songs chart.

The second single, "It Depends", was released on July 25, 2025. It was previewed on July 15, 2025, when Brown asked fans whether he should release the song as a single. The track features American singer and tour supporting act Bryson Tiller. It samples Nice & Slow by Usher. The song peaked at number 16 on the Billboard Hot 100 and number 3 on the Hot R&B/Hip-Hop Songs chart. It also reached number 1 on the R&B/Hip-Hop Airplay chart. A remix featuring Usher was released on October 17, 2025.

Brown's third single, "Obvious", was released on April 10, 2026. Its release coincided with the announcement of the album's release date. The song peaked at number 57 on the Billboard Hot 100 and number 13 on the Hot R&B/Hip-Hop Songs chart.

The album's fourth single, "Fallin'", was released on May 1, 2026, just a week before the album's release. The song is a blues track and features American singer Leon Thomas, along with background vocals from Tank. The song's music video was released the same day as its release.

== Critical reception ==
Professional ratings
Review scores
Source	Rating
AllMusic	2/5 stars
Pitchfork	1.3/10
Soul In Stereo	3/5 stars

Upon its release, the album received a mixed critical reception. Billboard gave the album a positive review, stating that "Brown is a 27-track buffet offering up his entire skillset, including some records strong enough to become part of his canon over time", commending Brown's emotional vocal performances, versatility and artistic growth. Pitchfork reviewer Alphonse Pierre was much less favorable. He gave the album a 1.3 out of 10 rating, stating "Chris Brown’s soulless, hit-chasing new album doesn’t justify his return to the public eye."

=== Awards and nominations ===
Awards and nominations for Brown
Year	Ceremony	Category	Result	Ref.
2027	Grammy Awards	Best R&B Album	Pending	

== Commercial performance ==
In the United States, Brown debuted at number seven on the US Billboard 200 with 65,000 album-equivalent units, which included 5,000 pure album sales in its first week, making it his 13th consecutive top-ten album in the country. The album also accumulated 60.31 million on-demand audio streams in the United States for its track list of 27 songs. The album jumped from position 106 to 22 on the Billboard 200, with 24,500 copies sold, after the release of The Chocolate Edition.

== Track listing ==
Brown track listing
No.	Title	Writer(s)	Producer(s)	Length
1.	"Leave Me Alone"	Chris Brown; Nelson Bridges; Jamal Gaines; Lorenzo Gaines; Jemmy Hernandez Cedeno; Peter Lee Johnson; Jamel McNair; William Scott; Leland Wayne; Kenneth Wilson	Ken Will; Johnson^{[c]}; Key Bridgez^{[c]}; Metro Boomin^{[c]}; Jenso "JP" Plymouth^{[v]}	6:03
2.	"Obvious"	C. Brown; Tyler Jordan; Major Myjah; Gabriel Roland; Amrita Sen; Leon Youngblood	RoccStar; Plymouth^{[v]}	3:06
3.	"Honey Pack"	C. Brown; Derrick Baker; Donny Flores; Steven Kubie; Cainon Lamb; Ryan Press; Dashon Vincent	Bigg D; Lamb; Press; Q-Beatz; Vincent; Plymouth^{[v]}	3:09
4.	"It Depends" (featuring Bryson Tiller)	C. Brown; Nico Baran; Brian Casey; Ant Clemons; Jermaine Dupri; Ephrem Lopez Jr.; Press; Usher Raymond IV; Manuel Seal; Bryson Tiller; Elliot Trent; Dewain Whitmore Jr.	Baran; RiotUSA	4:31
5.	"Fallin'" (featuring Leon Thomas)	C. Brown; Clifton Haralson; Antonio Moses; Myjah; Sen; Leon Thomas; L. Youngblood; Prince Youngblood; Syhre Youngblood	Haralson; Moses; RoccStar	4:26
6.	"Hate Me"	C. Brown; J. Gaines; Amish Patel; Alan Sampson	ADP; Sampson; Plymouth^{[v]}	2:18
7.	"Call Your Name" (featuring Sexyy Red and GloRilla)	C. Brown; Leslie Baptiste; Paul Beauregard; Brytavious Chambers; Johnisha Childs; Christopher Dotson; Edgar Ferrera; Sondre Haftorsen; Jordan Houston; Press; Christian Ward; Janae Wherry; Gloria Woods	Chrishan; Haftorsen; Hitmaka; Press; SkipOnDaBeat; Tay Keith; Plymouth^{[v]}	4:31
8.	"For the Moment"	C. Brown; Haralson; L. Youngblood	Haralson; RoccStar	3:26
9.	"Fuck and Party" (featuring Vybz Kartel)	C. Brown; Mario Bakovic; Daniel Coriglie; Loick Essien; J. Gaines; Adidja Palmer; Dennis-Manuel Peters; Trent	T-Town; Plymouth^{[v]}	4:37
10.	"Red Rum" (featuring YoungBoy Never Broke Again)	C. Brown; Kentrell Gaulden; Haralson; L. Youngblood	Haralson; RoccStar; RushDee	3:32
11.	"It's Not You It's Me"	C. Brown; Omari Akinlolu; Dotson; Benjamin Lasnier; Press; Kristian Rosendal; Steven Tolson; Ward	Chrishan; Hitmaka; Lasnier; Rosendal; Plymouth^{[v]}	3:07
12.	"Cry for Me"	C. Brown; Akinlolu; Paul Cabbin; Dotson; Major Finley; Miles Gregory; Mark Hudson; Press; Tolson; Ward	Cabbin; Hitmaka; Music Major; RockBoyBeats; Plymouth^{[v]}	2:26
13.	"Say Nothin'"	C. Brown; Kass Alexander; Ron E.; J. Gaines; Jean-Baptiste Kouame; Lexus Lewis; Jenso Plymouth; Karl Rubin; Tolson	Lewis; Rubin; Plymouth^{[v]}	3:06
14.	"Slow Jamz" (featuring Lucky Daye)	C. Brown; David Brown; Kevin Cossom; John Hajek; Press	Cossom; Hajek; Press; Plymouth^{[v]}	3:30
15.	"Perfect Timing" (featuring Fridayy)	C. Brown; Dotson; J. Gaines; Malachi Haden; Seok-jun Han; Travis Jasper; Tyler Jasper; Francis Leblanc; Ward	Aye YB; Osa; Wlcm; Plymouth^{[v]}	4:18
16.	"In My Head"	C. Brown; Christian Frazier; J. Gaines	Fresh; J. Gaines; Plymouth^{[v]}	2:48
17.	"What's Love"	C. Brown; Francesco Busi; Darius Coleman; Lucas da Mota Siqueira; J. Gaines; Leonard Lowman; Daniel Moras; Alex Petit	8een; CashMoneyAP; Kabeh; Moras; Skeez; Plymouth^{[v]}	3:25
18.	"Something in the Water"	C. Brown; J. Gaines; Kristian Hossy; Luciano Layne; Harvey Mason Jr.; Gabrielle Nowee; Lasse Qvist; Brooklyn Sarden; Damon Thomas	Hossy; Lou Xtwo; The Underdogs	3:16
19.	"Won't Let Me Leave"	C. Brown; Roland; L. Youngblood	RoccStar; Roland; Plymouth^{[v]}	2:58
20.	"#BodyGoals" (featuring Tank)	C. Brown; Durrell Babbs; Floyd Bentley; Sasha Lee; Gregory Lopez; Ernest Taylor; Jeffery Toney; Bobby Turner; Jirou Williams	Juberlee; SprngBrk; Williams; Plymouth^{[v]}	2:28
21.	"Colours"	C. Brown; Miles Barker; Francesco Carlesi; J. Gaines; Cameron Murphy; Woodlair Nosy	Barker; Fraka; Layrz; Murphykid; Plymouth^{[v]}	3:28
22.	"Skin to Skin"	C. Brown; William Gaines; Christopher McDade; Wilbert Richardson; Troy Christopher Taylor	Troy Taylor U the Goat; Willonnabeat; Xris Keys; Plymouth^{[v]}	2:45
23.	"Theme Song"	C. Brown; Dotson; Leigh Elliott; Sean Momberger; Press; Jarrett Todd; Trent; Ward	Hitmaka; Keyflo; Lee Major; Momberger; Plymouth^{[v]}	3:03
24.	"Your Time"	C. Brown; Alec Appolloni; Jesse Blocker III; Roberto Diaz; Plymouth	Blocker; Kyduh; Plymouth^{[v]}	2:48
25.	"It's Personal"	C. Brown; Andrew Dineen; Kevin Ekofo; J. Gaines; Ebby Marango; Tobi Oladigbolu	Drew80HD; Ebby; Kofo; TSB; Plymouth^{[v]}	2:57
26.	"Holy Blindfold"	C. Brown; Jonathan Bellion; Jason Cornet; Alexander Izquierdo; Jordan K. Johnson; Stefan Johnson	Bellion; The Monsters & Strangerz; TenRoc; Teezio^{[v]}	2:46
27.	"Present"	C. Brown; J. Gaines; Hunter Sallis; Wayne	Sallis; Metro Boomin^{[a]}; Plymouth^{[v]}	3:17
Total length:				92:05

The Chocolate Edition track listing
No.	Title	Writer(s)	Producer(s)	Length
1.	"Loose"	C. Brown; Whitmore Jr.; Ellery McKinney; Ryan Williamson; J. Gaines; Mary L. Smith; Marty Maro	Rykeyz	2:51
2.	"Man on a Mission" (featuring Wizkid)	C. Brown; Ayodeji Ibrahim Balogun; Justin Smith; Andre Carnell Robertson; Karim Esmail; Vanessa Wood; Scott Carter; Donald Earle DeGrate, Jr.	Bizness Boi; KVRIM; Triangle Park	3:52
3.	"Save Me"	C. Brown; L. Youngblood; Gaines; Mishon Ratliff; Ethan Sandfort-Marchese; Gerald Haddon; Jacquez Swanighan; Chales Hazlitt; Khalifah Macopson	Khalif The Ruler; RoccStar	2:49
4.	"Just the Bro" (featuring Tyga and Ty Dolla Sign)	C. Brown; Micheal Ray Stevenson; Tyrone William Griffin Jr.; Tre'Von Waters; Kristian Hossy; Jefferey Oliver Robinson; Akinlolu	Hossy; Fresh Ayr; HoodyBaby	3:24
5.	"GP"	C. Brown; Wilson; Bridges; J. Gaines; Lorenzo Gaines; Patrizio Pigliapoco; Vurdell Muller; Durvin Lucas; Dennis Richardson; Jamel McNair; Kessler Cuffman	Ken Will; Keyz Bridgez	3:34
6.	"Nthn2tlkbout"	C. Brown; Sonny Bishop; Bradley Thomas; Kyle Williams; T. Taylor; J. Gaines; Paige Evermore; Kefim Simmons	Troy Taylor U the Goat; Sonny Bishop	2:43
7.	"4Ever"	C. Brown; Muhssiah Lott; Michael Mulé; Isaac De Boni; Thomas; K. Williams; J. Gaines; Tariq Stewart; Sahil Datta; Angel López	Mizzy Lott; FnZ	2:48
8.	"No Signal"	C. Brown; Elijah Ross; J. Gaines; Lance Hunter; Anthony Leedel Norris; Jakira Shaw; Chazara Odom; Shanel Blackman	GYW Eli	3:20
9.	"Still Human"	C. Brown; Ward; Dotson; Kristian Rose; Rick Anthony	Hitmaka; Chrishan; Rose; Anthony	3:04
10.	"Appreciate It"	C. Brown; Babbs; Travis Emmett Bruce; Aakash Ravikrishnan; Joseph Alonzo Bereal Jr.; Robert Newt	AAKASH; Tank; the suply	3:14
Total length:				124:07

=== Notes ===
- ^{^[c]} indicates a co-producer
- ^{^[a]} indicates an additional producer
- ^{^[v]} indicates a vocal producer

== Personnel ==
Credits are adapted from Tidal.

- Chris Brown – vocals
- Jenso "JP" Plymouth – engineering
- Sebastian Hedge – engineering (track 14)
- Patrizio "Teezio" Pigliapoco – mixing
- Emiliano Olocco – mixing assistance
- Ohad Nissim – mastering
- Liran Goldschmidt – mastering assistance (tracks 1–3, 5–25, 27)
- Nick Anderson – engineering assistance (2, 5, 8, 10, 19, 20)
- Tank – background vocals (5)
- Ebby – background vocals (25)

== Charts ==
Chart performance for Brown
Chart (2026)	Peak position
Australian Albums (ARIA)	16
Australian Hip Hop/R&B Albums (ARIA)	1
Belgian Albums (Ultratop Flanders)	99
Belgian Albums (Ultratop Wallonia)	119
Canadian Albums (Billboard)	16
Dutch Albums (Album Top 100)	17
French Albums (SNEP)	58
German Albums (Offizielle Top 100)	77
Irish Albums (IRMA)	89
Japanese Digital Albums (Oricon)	37
Japanese Download Albums (Billboard Japan)	29
New Zealand Albums (RMNZ)	5
Nigerian Albums (TurnTable)	18
Norwegian Albums (IFPI Norge)	35
Portuguese Albums (AFP)	29
Swiss Albums (Schweizer Hitparade)	7
UK Albums (Official Charts)	17
UK R&B Albums (Official Charts)	4
US Billboard 200	7
US Top R&B/Hip-Hop Albums (Billboard)	3
