= Feel Something =

Feel Something may refer to:

- Feel Something (Movements album)
- Feel Something (The History of Apple Pie album)
- "Feel Something" (Bea Miller song)
- "Feel Something" (Armin van Buuren song)
- "Feel Something" (Illenium, Excision and I Prevail song)
- "Feel Something" (Chris Brown song)
- "Feel Something", a song by Adam Lambert from Velvet
- "Feel Something", a song by Clairo from Immunity
- "Feel Something", a song by Pink from Trustfall
- "Feel Something", a single by Madi Diaz from Fatal Optimist
- "Feel Something", a song by Tyla from A*Pop
- Feel Something, an album by Jaymes Young
