= Stony Hill =

Stony Hill may refer to:

- Stony Hill, Jamaica, a neighborhood on the outskirts of Kingston
- Stony Hill (album), by Damian Marley (2017)
- Stony Hill, a strategic elevation during the Battle of Gettysburg, second day
- Stony Hill, a townland in County Antrim, Northern Ireland
