= The History of Apple Pie =

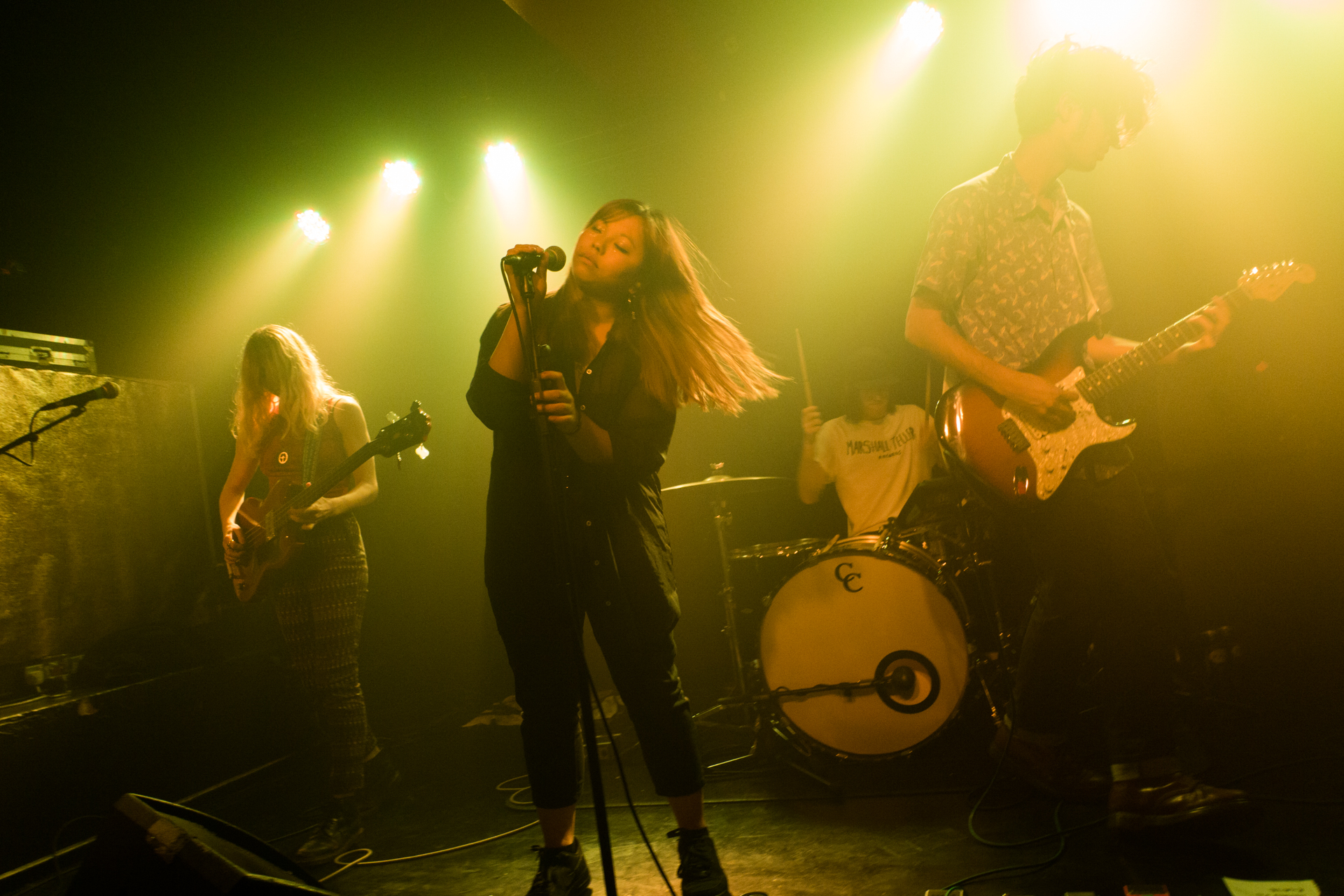
- The History of Apple Pie at The Lexington in 2014

Background information
- Origin: London, England
- Genres: Shoegaze; noise pop; indie pop; dream pop
- Years active: 2010–2015
- Labels: Marshall Teller Records
- Past members: Steph Min; Jerome Watson; James Thomas; Aslam Ghauri; Joanna Curwood; Kelly Lee Owens
- Website: soundcloud.com/thehistoryofapplepie

The History of Apple Pie were an English rock band from London. They released their debut album Out of View on 28 January 2013, which went in at number 8 in the UK Indie Breakers Chart, and number 2 in the UK Record Store Chart.

== History ==
The History of Apple Pie began when singer Stephanie Min and guitarist Jerome Watson played songs together, put them on the internet and began to get e-mails by labels and managers. The two put an ad on Gumtree to recruit band-mates, which resulted in the addition of drummer James Thomas, guitarist Aslam Ghauri and bassist Kelly Owens. When asked if their name was an American reference, Steph replied

"No! Jerome and I didn't think the music would come to anything and we were in our room just googling random things trying to come up with a list, the one that we were both attracted to was the History of Apple Pie, which had a ring to it and didn't mean anything. We're criticised a lot for the name but it's something we never think about – to us it's not what should be at the forefront of a band's worries!

They released their debut single "You're So Cool" on 19 June 2011, on 7" vinyl and as a digital download. The next single was "Mallory" released on 27 November 2011, on vinyl and download. They began recording their first album in 2012, but scrapped their efforts because they weren't happy with it. They re-recorded the album and released their third single "See You" in January 2013. Their debut album Out of View was released in the UK on 28 January 2013 and 29 January 2013 in the US. On 3 March, they released their fourth single "Do It Wrong". On 11 October, they released the non-album single "Don't You Wanna Be Mine". They released their second album "Feel Something" on 29 September 2014, with Joanna Curwood replacing Owens on bass. The band silently disbanded in 2015.

== Discography ==
=== Albums ===
Title	Album details	Peak chart positions	
Title	Album details	UK Indie Breakers	Record Store
Out of View	Released: 28 January 2013 (UK) 29 January 2013 (US); Labels: Marshall Teller Records; Formats: LP, CD, DD	8	2
Feel Something	Released: 29 September 2014 (UK) 30 September 2014 (US); Labels: Marshall Teller Records		

== Singles ==
- You're So Cool - 19 June 2011
- Mallory - 27 November 2011
- See You - 13 January 2013
- Do It Wrong - 3 March 2013
- Don't You Wanna Be Mine - 11 October 2013
