= Out of View =

Studio album by The History of Apple Pie
- Released: 28 January 2013 (UK); 29 January 2013 (US)
- Recorded: 2012, London
- Genre: Noise pop, indie pop, dream pop, shoegazing
- Length: 42:58
- Label: Marshall Teller
- Producer: Joshua Hayward, Jerome Watson

The History of Apple Pie chronology
Out of View (2013)	Feel Something (2014)

Singles from Out of View
- 1. "You're So Cool" Released: 19 June 2013; 2. "Mallory" Released: 27 November 2013; 3. "See You" Released: 13 January 2013; 4. "Do It Wrong" Released: 3 March 2013

Out of View is the debut album by British rock band The History of Apple Pie, released through Marshall Teller on 28 January 2013 on vinyl, CD and as a digital download. The album went at number 8 in the UK Indie Breakers Chart, and number 2 in the UK Record Store Chart.

== Background and recording ==
The History of Apple Pie formed when singer Stephanie and guitarist Jerome played songs together and put them on the internet and began to get e-mails by labels and managers. The two put an advert on Gumtree advertising to form a band, which drummer James responded to. They auditioned him and accepted, and also got guitarist Aslam and bass player Kelly. They released their debut single "You're So Cool" on 19 June 2011, on 7" vinyl and as a digital download. The next single was "Mallory" released on 27 November 2011, on vinyl and download.

In 2012, they began recording their first album. They scrapped the whole thing, because they weren't happy with it, and began recording it again in late 2012. When THOAP had started, "Out of View" was one of the first songs Jerome and Steph had written before the band was formed, and although the song wasn't on the album, they called the album Out of View because it "seemed significant in that sense, so that's what the album's called."

== Release ==
In October 2012, THOAP announced the release of their first album with pre-order links. In January, they released a new single for "See You" along with a video. Out of View was released on 28 January 2013 in the UK and 29 January in the US, on 12" gatefold vinyl, CD and as a download as well as a deluxe edition. On 3 March, they released their fourth single "Do It Wrong".

== Track listing ==
All songs written by Stephanie Min & Jerome Watson.

1. Tug - 4:45
2. See You - 4:38
3. Mallory - 4:11
4. The Warrior - 3:39
5. Glitch - 3:38
6. You're So Cool - 3:22
7. I Want More - 5:25
8. Do It Wrong - 2:46
9. Long Way to Go - 4:22
10. Before You Reach the End - 6:09

== Charts ==
Chart (2013)	Peak position
UK Indie Breakers Chart	8
UK Record Store Chart	2
