= Fallin' (Chris Brown song) =

Single by Chris Brown featuring Leon Thomas

from the album Brown
- Released: May 1, 2026
- Genre: Blues; R&B
- Length: 4:26
- Label: RCA; CBE
- Lyricists: C. Brown; Major Myjah; Leon Thomas
- Producers: Clifton Haralson; Antonio Moses; RoccStar

Chris Brown singles chronology
"Obvious" (2026)	"Fallin'" (2026)	"Face Card" (2026)

Leon Thomas singles chronology
"Miss U 2" (2026)	"Fallin'" (2026)	"Trophy" (2026)

Music video
- "Fallin'" on YouTube

"Fallin'" is a song by American singer Chris Brown featuring American singer Leon Thomas. It was released on May 1, 2026, as the fourth single from Brown's twelfth studio album, Brown.

== Background and release ==
The release marks Brown and Thomas's second collaboration following a 2025 official remix of Thomas’ song "Mutt." Brown composed the song with his producers before sending it to Thomas. "Fallin'" was released on May 1, 2026, just a week before Brown's release.

== Composition ==
The song is a blues and R&B track about being stuck in a cycle of love that the performers cannot shake. HotNewHipHop described it as "a smooth, emotionally heavy record that leans into love, regret, and vulnerability". American singer Tank provides background vocals for the entire track. The track has a duration of 4 minutes and 26 seconds and features an electric guitar solo.

== Critical reception ==
Billboard said "Fallin'" was "ambitious in all of the best ways" and "easily one of the most soulful performances of CB's career". AllMusic mentioned the track among the album's best material.

== Music video ==
The official music video for "Fallin'", directed by Travis Colbert, was released the same day as the song. The eight-minute visual showcases 1930s imagery, and its aesthetic was compared to films such as Harlem Nights, Idlewild, and Sinners. The video features appearances from Usher, RoccStar and Tank, who provides background vocals in the song.

== Charts ==
Weekly chart performance for "Fallin'"
Chart (2026)	Peak position
Australia Hip Hop/R&B (ARIA)	9
New Zealand (Recorded Music NZ)	31
Nigeria (TurnTable Top 100)	68
Nigeria Airplay (TurnTable)	32
South Africa Streaming (TOSAC)	52
UK Singles (Official Charts)	87
US Billboard Hot 100	80
US Hot R&B/Hip-Hop Songs (Billboard)	19
US R&B/Hip-Hop Airplay (Billboard)	12
