= Summer Too Hot =

Single by Chris Brown

from the album 11:11
- Released: June 23, 2023
- Recorded: 2023
- Genre: R&B
- Length: 3:08
- Label: RCA; CBE
- Lyricists: Christopher Brown; Nasri; Toney Martinez; Major Myjah
- Producers: RoccStar; DSTRK

Chris Brown singles chronology
"Don't Give It Away" (2023)	"Summer Too Hot" (2023)	"How We Roll" (2023)

Music video
- "Summer Too Hot" on YouTube

"Summer Too Hot" is a song recorded by American singer Chris Brown from his eleventh studio album 11:11. The song was released as the album's lead single on June 23, 2023.

"Summer Too Hot" was nominated at the 66th Annual Grammy Awards for Best R&B Performance.

== Background and release ==
On May 19, 2023, Brown teased the release of new music on his Instagram account, writing: "If y'all thought I wasn't gonna drop a single for the summer, think again". He later officially announced the release of "Summer Too Hot" on June 17, sharing the single's title, cover art, and release date for June 23, 2023. The artwork for the song was shot by photographer Mastermind, and features the singer walking through the ocean, wearing a full green outfit, and a pair of "Nami Slides".

== Composition ==
"Summer Too Hot" is an R&B mid-tempo, based on what Revolt described as a "bouncy" instrumental. The song was written by Brown along with singer Nasri—who previously worked with the singer for his singles "Crawl" (2009), "Next to You" (2011), and "Don't Judge Me" (2012)—as well as Toney Martinez, and Major Myjah. Production was handled by Brown's frequent collaborator RoccStar, and DSTRK. On "Summer Too Hot" Brown displays his falsetto during his vocal performance. The song's theme is centered around sexual desire, and is located in a summertime context.

== Critical reception ==
Kayla Sandiford of Renowned for Sound described "Summer Too Hot" as "a classic Chris Brown song", stating that "it does what it intends to do, acting as a slow-pulsing summer feel-good number". Andy Kellman of AllMusic called it one of the singer's "warmest singles". HotNewHipHop said that "Summer Too Hot" is "one of his recent bests", commenting that it "contains some truly impressive vocals from the singer".

== Music video ==
On August 18, 2023, Brown uploaded the music video for "Summer Too Hot" on his YouTube account. The video was directed by Christian Breslauer. For the video Brown recruited most dancers that were part of the previous music videos of his career.

=== Synopsis ===
The video is set in an urban summer scenario, and starts with a radio speaker warning his listeners of the high temperatures outside, then announcing "even hotter tunes on the way", with "Summer Too Hot" starting to play. The video features Brown and his dancers doing complex choreographies throughout the clip, with the singer transforming objects into water with his dance moves. Brown then starts to follow a girl who's in the backseat of a convertible car, interpreted by Janina Garraway, who previously starred in Brown's "Say Goodbye"'s music video. Brown eventually transforms himself into a water-man during the last dancing scene of the video, ending the video reaching the car where the girl that caught his eye stayed.

== Commercial performance ==
The song debuted at number 93 on the US Billboard Hot 100 on the issue dated September 2, 2023, tallying Brown's 115th entry on the chart. In the next week, the song fell at number 96 on the chart.

== Track listing ==
- Digital download and streaming
1. "Summer Too Hot" (Sped Up) – 2:41
2. "Summer Too Hot" – 3:08

== Charts ==
=== Weekly charts ===
Weekly chart performance for "Summer Too Hot"
Chart (2023)	Peak position
New Zealand Hot Singles (RMNZ)	4
UK Singles Sales (OCC)	96
US Billboard Hot 100	93
US Hot R&B/Hip-Hop Songs (Billboard)	26
US Pop Airplay (Billboard)	31
US R&B/Hip-Hop Airplay (Billboard)	11
US Rhythmic Airplay (Billboard)	2

=== Year-end charts ===
2023 year-end chart performance for "Summer Too Hot"
Chart (2023)	Position
US Hot R&B/Hip-Hop Songs (Billboard)	98
US Rhythmic (Billboard)	30

== Certifications ==
Certifications for "Summer Too Hot"
Region	Certification	Certified units/sales
New Zealand (RMNZ)	Gold	15,000^{‡}
^{‡} Sales+streaming figures based on certification alone.
