= Holy Blindfold =

2025 single by Chris Brown

Single by Chris Brown

from the album Brown
- Released: June 13, 2025
- Recorded: 2025
- Genre: R&B; dream pop; gospel
- Length: 2:50
- Label: CBE; RCA
- Songwriters: Chris Brown; Jon Bellion; Jordan Johnson; Stefan Johnson; Jason Cornet; Alexander Izquierdo
- Producers: The Monsters & Strangerz; Bellion; Tenroc

Chris Brown singles chronology
"Use Me" (2025)	"Holy Blindfold" (2025)	"It Depends" (2025)

Music video
- "Holy Blindfold" on YouTube

"Holy Blindfold" is a song by American singer Chris Brown. It was produced by the Monsters & Strangerz, Jon Bellion and Tenroc. It was released on June 13, 2025, as the lead single from the singer's twelfth studio album, Brown.

== Background ==
Chris Brown first teased the song in May 2025, after he was released from jail in the United Kingdom. On June 5, 2025, he announced the release date and teased the song on social media with a visual of him emerging from a swirling portal and walking in slow motion to a microphone.

== Composition ==
"Holy Blindfold" is an R&B song with dream-pop textures over gospel-tinged harmonies. The song finds Brown crooning about his intense love toward a woman, and wanting her to be his solace, over dreamy production. According to AllMusic, the song features "ethereal production flashing back to '90s ambient house and trip-hop", while Brown's performance portrays an "enraptured romantic".e best part of the song.

== Music video ==
Brown released the official music video for "Holy Blindfold" on July 30, 2025, directed by his tour photographer, Travis Colbert. The video arrived alongside the launch of Brown's North American Breezy Bowl XX Tour, which started in Miami on July 30, 2025.

=== Synopsis ===
The music video for "Holy Blindfold" presents a narrative in which Brown is guided blindfolded through various settings by an angelic woman. The two communicate through expressive and fluid dance movements, demonstrating an unspoken trust and connection. Despite his lack of sight, the video illustrates love in its most elemental form—something felt rather than seen. According to Rated R&B, the video features Brown's signature high-energy choreography, adding a cinematic quality that complements the song's emotive tone. In the music video, Brown dances through three distinct settings. He begins by spinning across the marble floors of an empty mansion, then glides through misty garden paths, and finally takes center stage in a floodlit, empty stadium. A mysterious winged figure appears in each scene, disappearing at the video's conclusion when Brown removes his blindfold.

== Charts ==
=== Weekly charts ===
Weekly chart performance for "Holy Blindfold"
Chart (2025)	Peak position
Czech Republic Airplay (ČNS IFPI)	16
New Zealand (Recorded Music NZ)	37
UK Singles (Official Charts)	55
UK Hip Hop/R&B (Official Charts)	11
US Billboard Hot 100	89
US Hot R&B/Hip-Hop Songs (Billboard)	21
US Pop Airplay (Billboard)	30
US R&B/Hip-Hop Airplay (Billboard)	12
US Rhythmic Airplay (Billboard)	2

=== Year-end charts ===
2025 year-end chart performance for "Holy Blindfold"
Chart (2025)	Position
US Rhythmic (Billboard)	34

== Release history ==
Release history for "Holy Blindfold"
Region	Date	Format(s)	Label(s)	Ref.
Various	June 13, 2025	Digital download; streaming	CBE; RCA	
United States	June 17, 2025	Rhythmic contemporary radio	CBE; RCA	
United States	July 22, 2025	Contemporary hit radio	CBE; RCA	
