= List of Billboard Boxscore number-one concert series of the 2020s =

The Billboard Boxscore is a box score published by Billboard magazine reporting gross revenue and attendance figures of concerts. Billboard launched the boxscore ranking in 1975 through Amusement Business, its sister publication. The ranking has been featured on Billboard magazine itself since October 3, 1981. In March 2019, Billboard introduced a monthly boxscore chart, providing "a more accurate and comparative look at performances over a standardized period."

== List of number ones ==
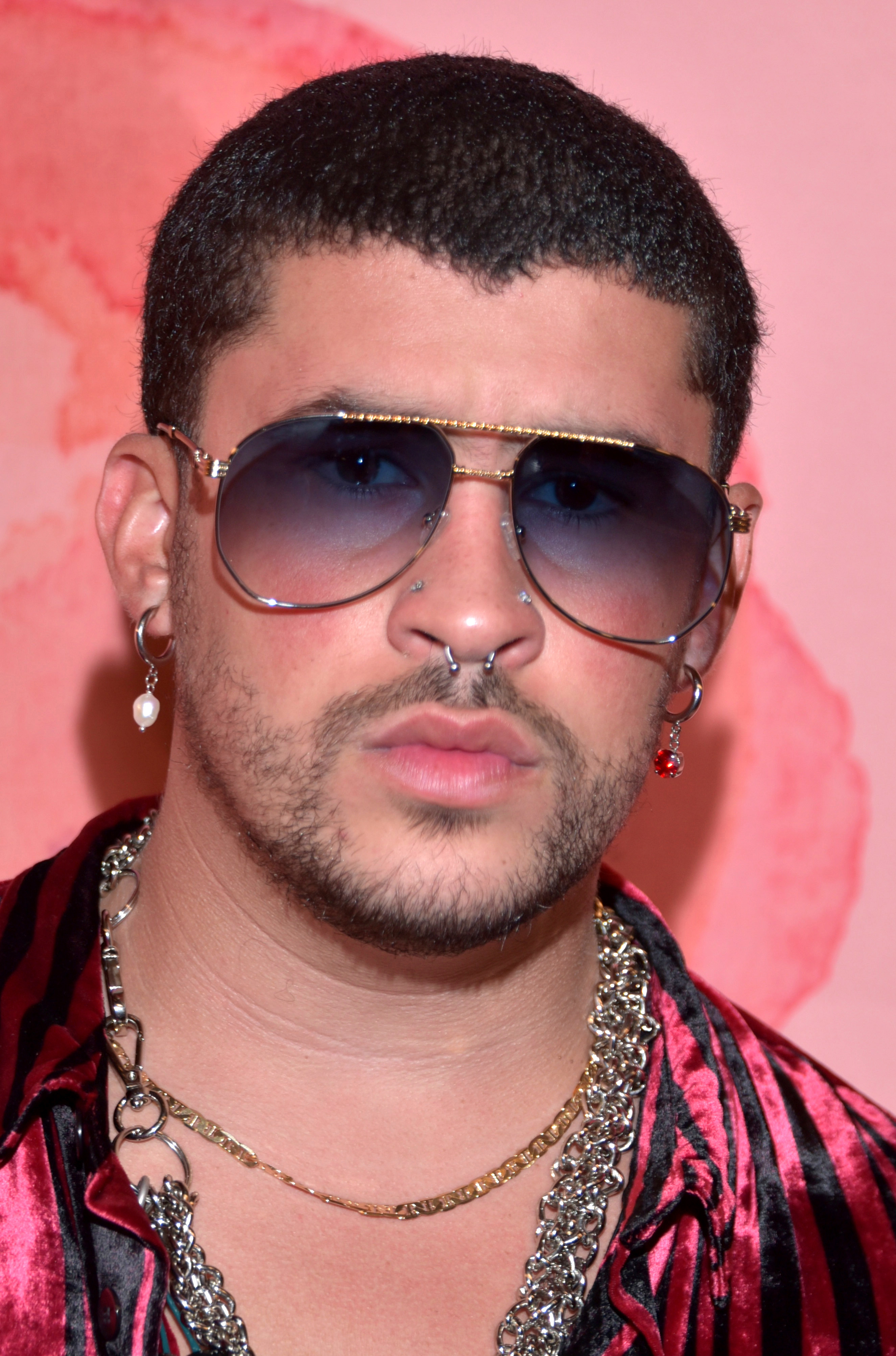
Bad Bunny topped the monthly chart ten times during the 2020s. He also topped the year-end chart in 2022.

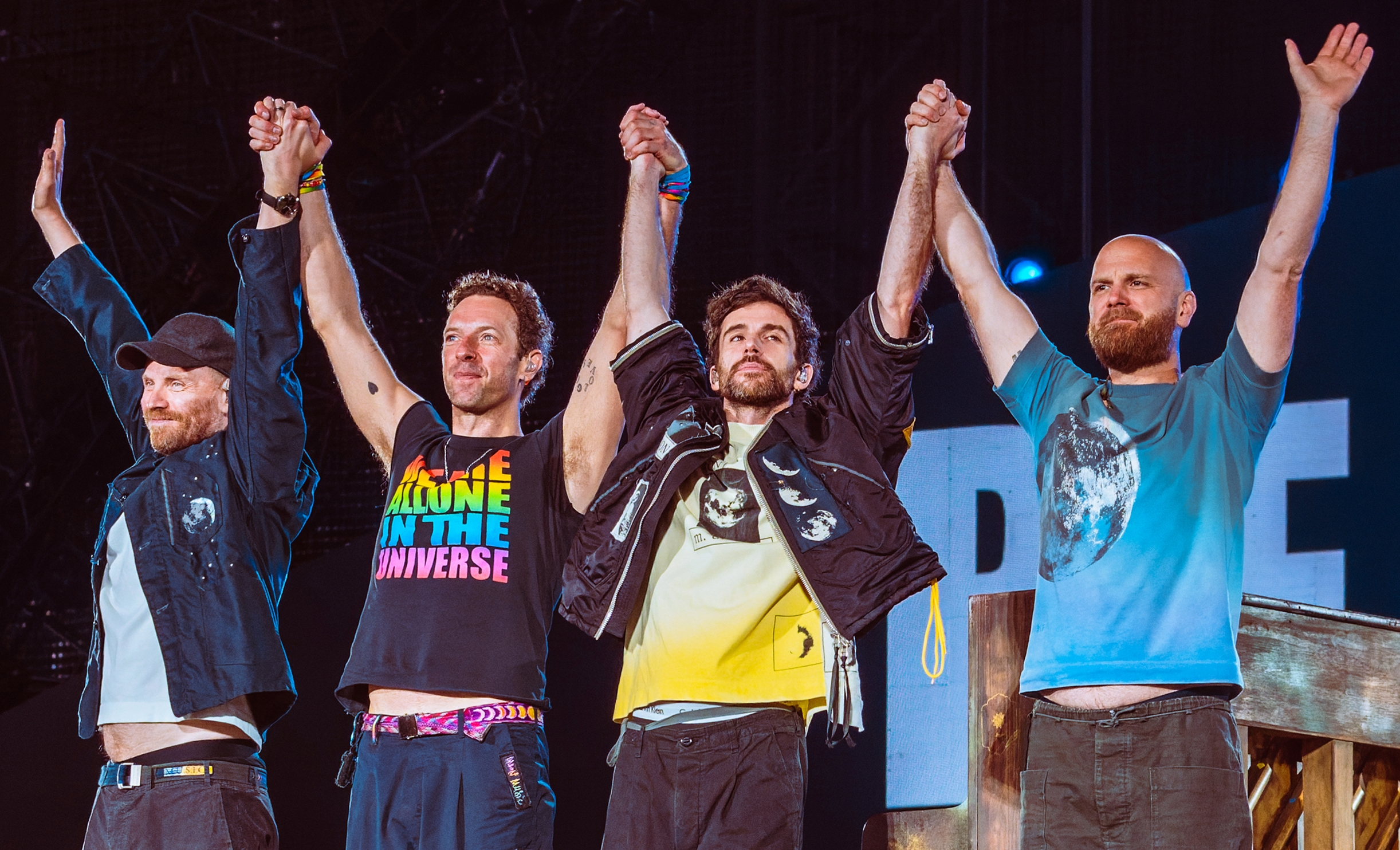
Coldplay topped the monthly chart seven times during the 2020s. They also topped the year-end chart twice, in 2024 and 2025.

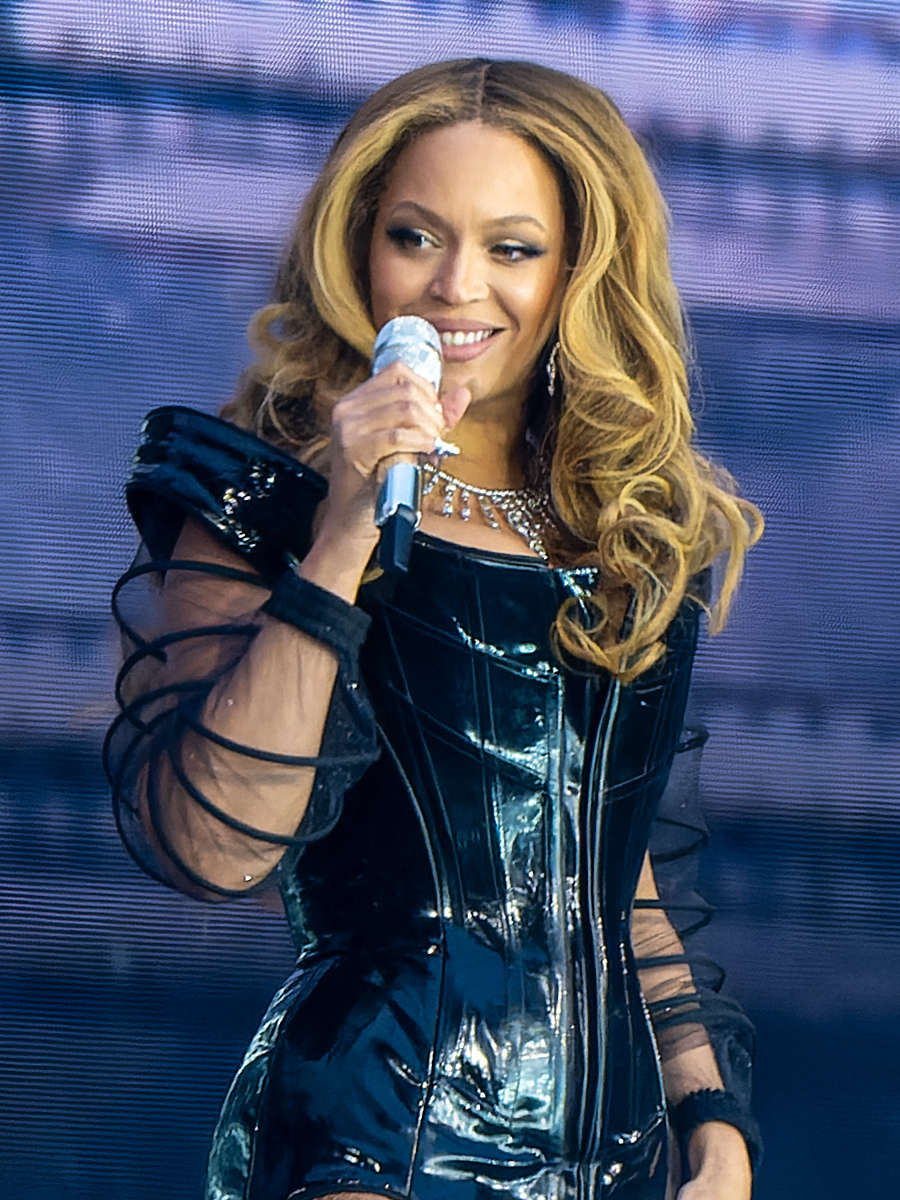
Beyoncé topped the monthly chart seven times during the 2020s. She also topped the year-end chart in 2023.

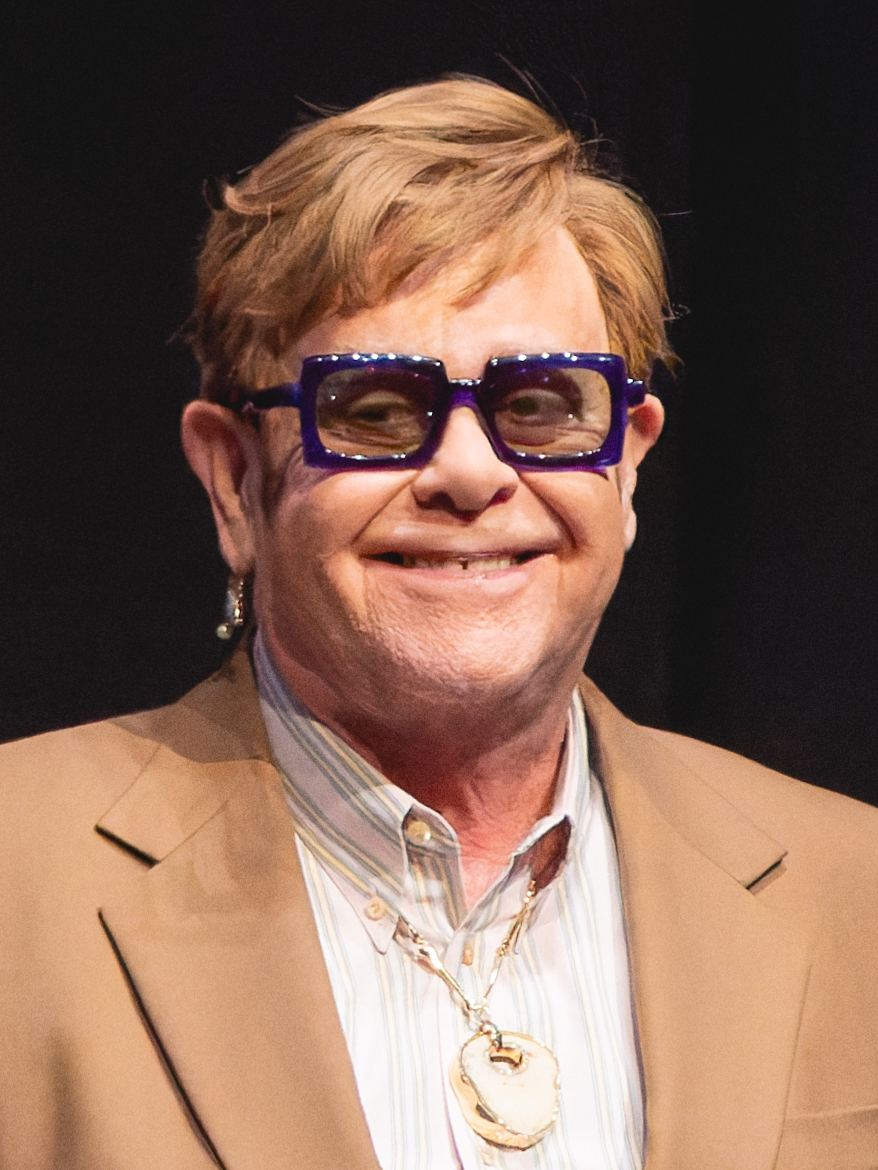
Elton John topped the monthly chart four times during the 2020s. He also topped the year-end chart in 2020.

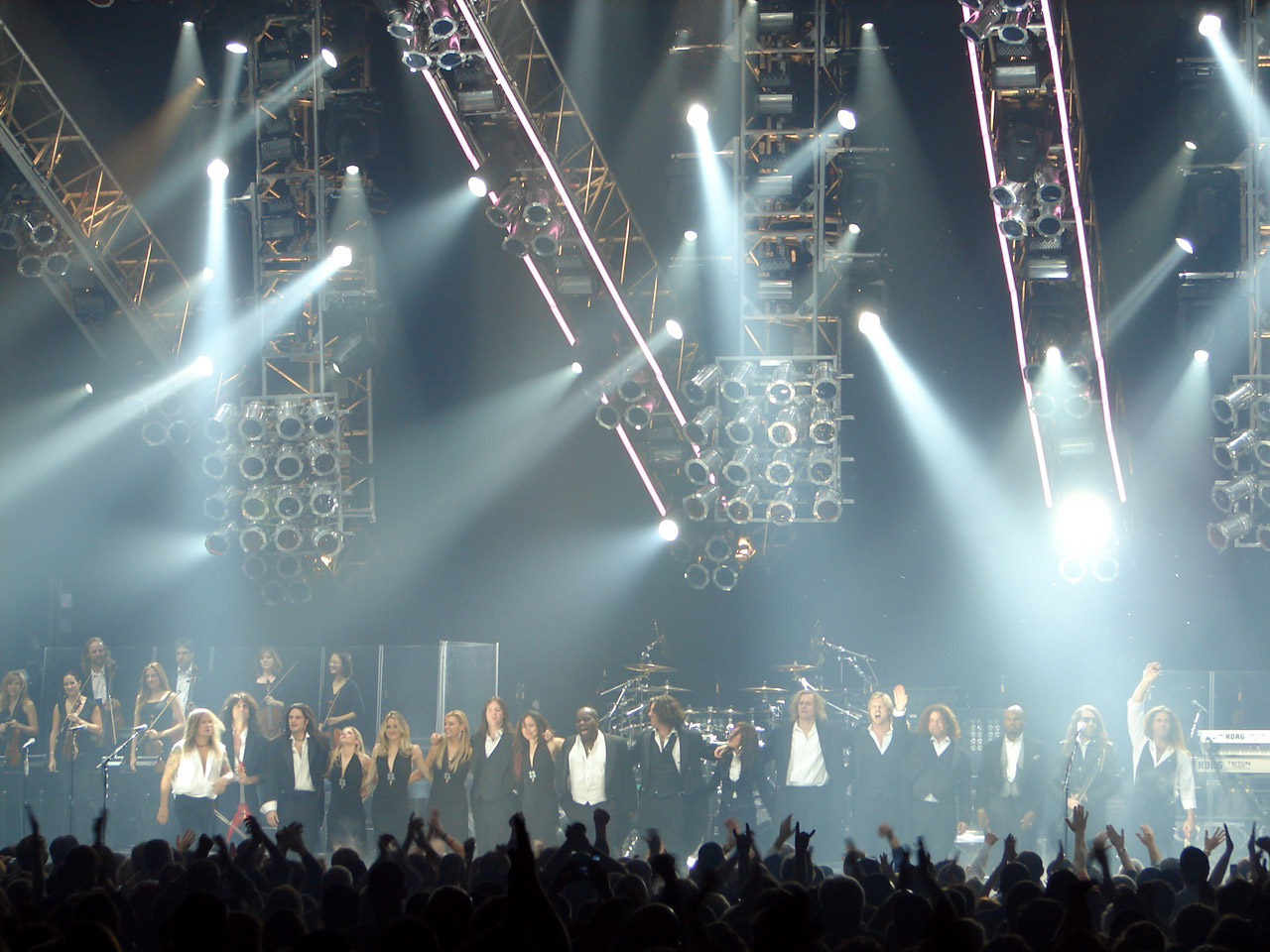
Trans-Siberian Orchestra topped the monthly chart four times during the 2020s.

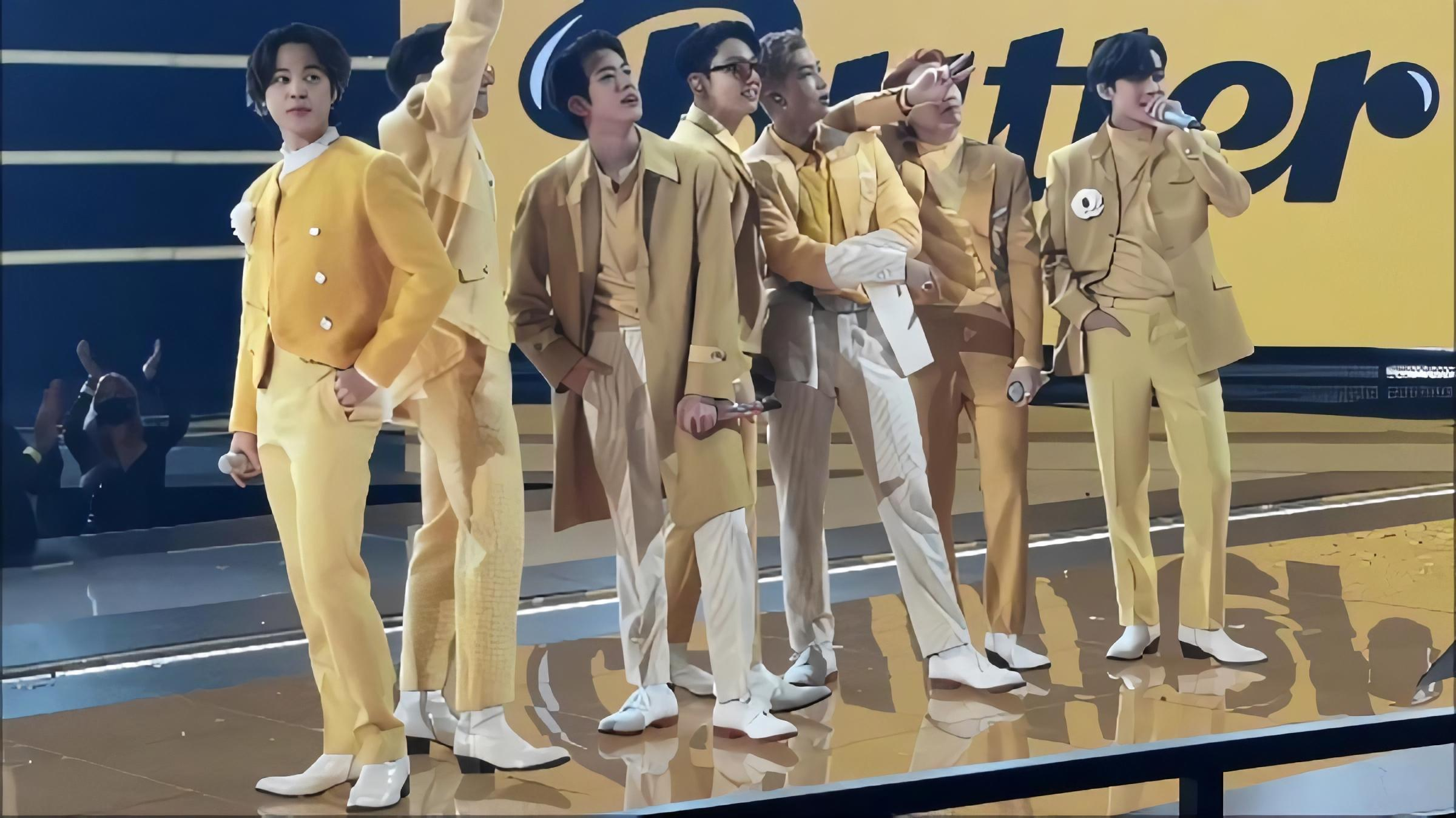
BTS topped the monthly chart four times during the 2020s.

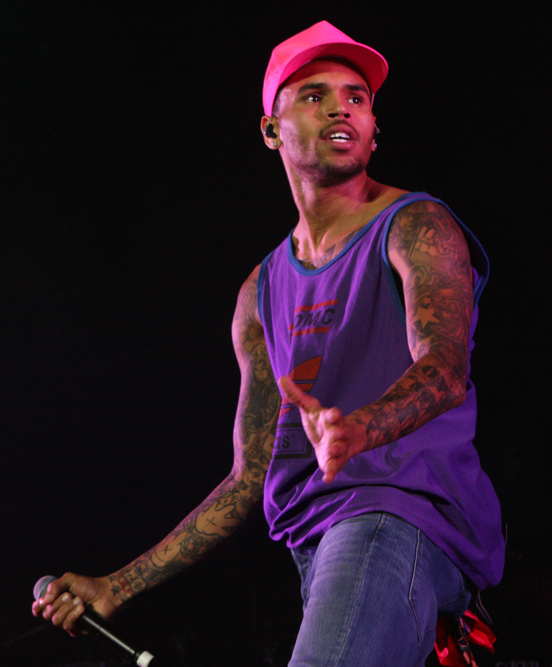
Chris Brown topped the monthly chart four times during the 2020s.

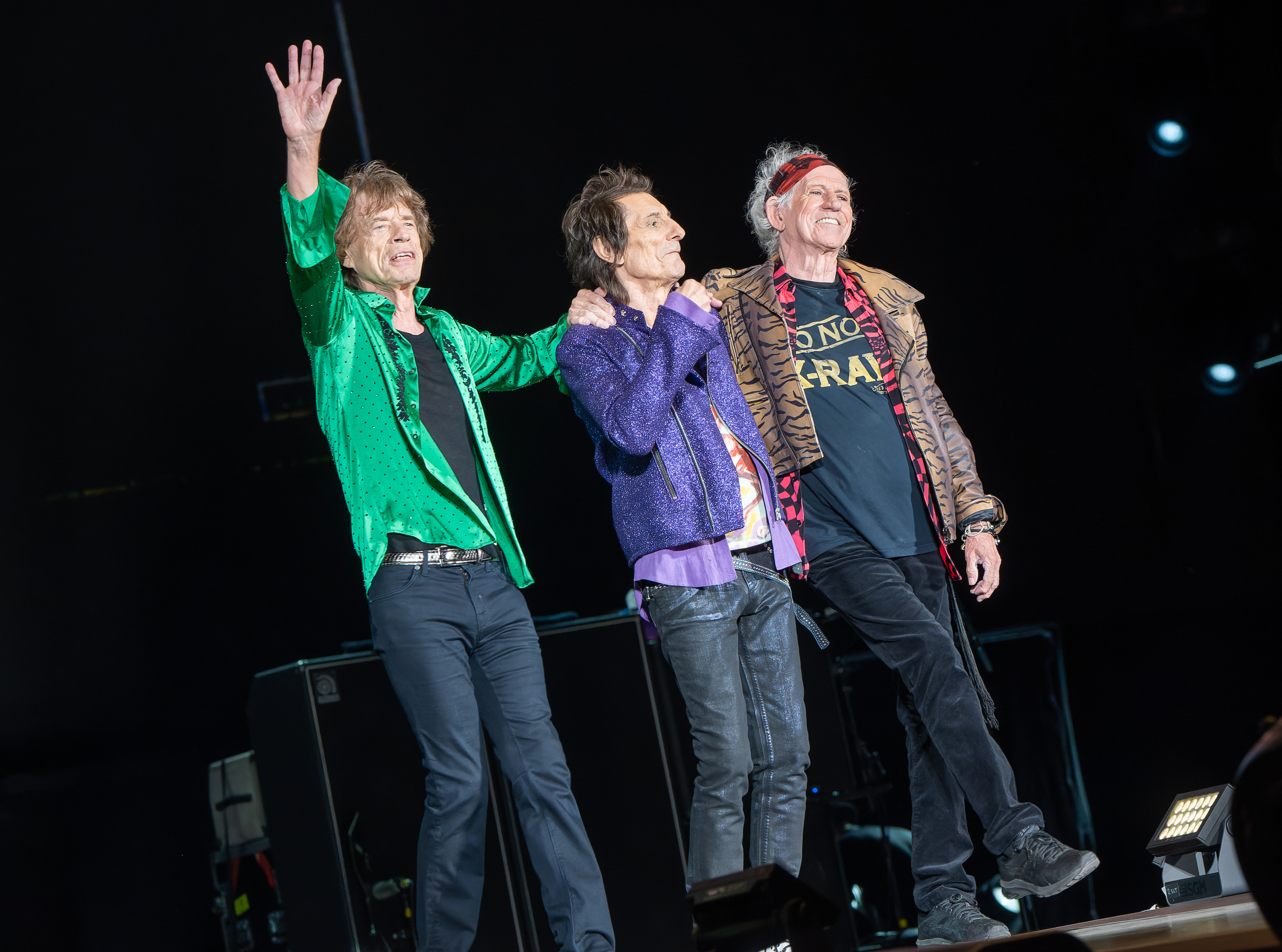
The Rolling Stones topped the monthly chart twice during the 2020s. They also topped the year-end chart in 2021.

=== Monthly charts ===
Period	Artists	Tour or residency	Gross	Tickets sold	No. of shows	Ref.
2020
January 2020	Elton John	Farewell Yellow Brick Road	$19,712,220	152,942	9	
February 2020	Post Malone	Runaway Tour	$27,228,240	199,389	15	
March 2020	Backstreet Boys	DNA World Tour	$12,062,262	160,358	10	
April 2020 – December 2020	Suspended due to the COVID-19 pandemic					
2021
January 2021 – May 2021	Suspended due to the COVID-19 pandemic					
June 2021 – August 2021	Bruno Mars	Bruno Mars at Park MGM	$19,281,712	59,304	12	
September 2021	Los Bukis	Una Historia Cantada	$22,133,190	180,619	5	
October 2021	The Rolling Stones	No Filter Tour	$56,035,028	259,144	6	
November 2021	The Rolling Stones	No Filter Tour	$58,594,260	236,913	6	
December 2021	Trans-Siberian Orchestra	Winter Tour	$42,018,748	588,172	71	
2022
January 2022	Tool	Tool in Concert	$13,760,744	119,702	10	
February 2022	Bad Bunny	El Último Tour del Mundo 2022	$39,845,291	182,881	12	
March 2022	Bad Bunny	El Último Tour del Mundo 2022	$64,534,537	336,989	20	
April 2022	BTS	Permission to Dance on Stage	$35,944,850	199,697	4	
May 2022	Paul McCartney	Got Back	$52,352,859	206,061	9	
June 2022	Ed Sheeran	+−=÷× Tour	$63,765,988	749,529	12	
July 2022	Coldplay	Music of the Spheres World Tour	$66,747,697	730,722	11	
August 2022	Bad Bunny	World's Hottest Tour	$91,083,194	404,364	9	
September 2022	Bad Bunny	World's Hottest Tour	$123,723,791	500,555	11	
October 2022	Elton John	Farewell Yellow Brick Road	$49,597,863	291,668	8	
November 2022	Elton John	Farewell Yellow Brick Road	$60,156,073	339,933	8	
December 2022	Trans-Siberian Orchestra	Winter Tour	$50,900,849	690,847	71	
2023
January 2023	Elton John	Farewell Yellow Brick Road	$40,896,934	242,053	8	
February 2023	Ed Sheeran	+−=÷× Tour	$50,635,982	475,427	8	
March 2023	Coldplay	Music of the Spheres World Tour	$65,439,031	736,439	11	
April 2023	Morgan Wallen	One Night at a Time World Tour	$27,934,180	144,740	4	
May 2023	Beyoncé	Renaissance World Tour	$67,500,000	461,000	9	
June 2023	Harry Styles	Love On Tour	$105,400,000	967,000	15	
July 2023	Beyoncé	Renaissance World Tour	$127,600,000	503,000	11	
August 2023	Beyoncé	Renaissance World Tour	$179,300,000	697,000	14	
September 2023	Beyoncé	Renaissance World Tour	$121,900,000	476,000	9	
October 2023	Pink	Summer Carnival; Trustfall Tour	$51,200,000	271,000	10	
November 2023	RBD	Soy Rebelde Tour	$71,100,000	734,000	17	
December 2023	Trans-Siberian Orchestra	Winter Tour	$51,500,000	657,000	73	
2024
January 2024	Coldplay	Music of the Spheres World Tour	$58,800,000	417,000	8	
February 2024	U2	U2:UV Achtung Baby Live at Sphere	$56,500,000	166,000	10	
March 2024	Bad Bunny	Most Wanted Tour	$64,600,000	207,000	13	
April 2024	Bad Bunny	Most Wanted Tour	$63,000,000	210,000	14	
May 2024	Bad Bunny	Most Wanted Tour	$60,400,000	212,300	14	
June 2024	Zach Bryan	The Quittin' Time Tour	$68,900,000	340,000	10	
July 2024	Coldplay	Music of the Spheres World Tour	$72,200,000	575,000	11	
August 2024	Zach Bryan	The Quittin' Time Tour	$93,200,000	467,000	13	
September 2024	Green Day	The Saviors Tour	$47,500,000	415,000	12	
October 2024	Pink	Summer Carnival; Trustfall Tour	$44,200,000	254,000	9	
November 2024	Coldplay	Music of the Spheres World Tour	$71,100,000	609,000	9	
December 2024	Trans-Siberian Orchestra	Winter Tour	$48,200,000	581,000	70	
2025
January 2025	Coldplay	Music of the Spheres World Tour	$56,600,000	590,000	9	
February 2025	Shakira	Las Mujeres Ya No Lloran World Tour	$32,900,000	282,000	6	
March 2025	Shakira	Las Mujeres Ya No Lloran World Tour	$70,600,000	554,000	11	
April 2025	Coldplay	Music of the Spheres World Tour	$67,400,000	502,000	10	
May 2025	Beyoncé	Cowboy Carter Tour	$157,400,000	567,000	12	
June 2025	Beyoncé	Cowboy Carter Tour	$136,800,000	594,000	11	
July 2025	Beyoncé	Cowboy Carter Tour	$102,300,000	392,000	8	
August 2025	Chris Brown	Breezy Bowl XX	$96,800,000	590,000	14	
September 2025	Chris Brown	Breezy Bowl XX	$98,100,000	580,000	13	
October 2025	Chris Brown	Breezy Bowl XX	$46,800,000	286,000	7	
November 2025	Paul McCartney	Got Back	$51,700,000	150,000	11	
December 2025	Bad Bunny	Debí Tirar Más Fotos World Tour	$99,100,000	633,000	10	
2026
January 2026	Bad Bunny	Debí Tirar Más Fotos World Tour	$62,500,000	409,000	8	
February 2026	Ed Sheeran	Loop Tour	$70,800,000	526,000	10	
March 2026	Lady Gaga	The Mayhem Ball	$45,600,000	154,000	12	
April 2026	BTS	Arirang World Tour	$76,200,000	417,000	8	
May 2026	BTS	Arirang World Tour	$127,800,000	641,000	12	
June 2026	Bad Bunny	Debí Tirar Más Fotos World Tour	$123,100,000	773,500	14	
July 2026	The Weeknd	After Hours til Dawn Tour	$124,400,000	892,000	16	
August 2026	BTS	Arirang World Tour	$171,700,000	801,000	12	
September 2026	Chris Brown and Usher	The R&B Tour	$77,400,000	423,000	10	

=== Year-end charts ===
Year	Tracking period	Artists	Tour or residency	Gross	Tickets sold	No. of shows	Ref.
2020	November 1, 2019 – October 31, 2020	Elton John	Farewell Yellow Brick Road	$114,084,311	790,727	47	
2021	November 1, 2020 – October 31, 2021	The Rolling Stones	No Filter Tour	$72,312,475	340,390	8	
2022	November 1, 2021 – October 31, 2022	Bad Bunny	El Último Tour del Mundo 2022; World's Hottest Tour	$373,463,379	1,826,339	65	
2023	November 1, 2022 – September 30, 2023	Beyoncé	Renaissance World Tour	$570,500,000	2,700,000	55	
2024	October 1, 2023 – September 30, 2024	Coldplay	Music of the Spheres World Tour	$400,900,000	3,000,000	51	
2025	October 1, 2024 – September 30, 2025	Coldplay	Music of the Spheres World Tour	$464,900,000	3,500,000	59	
