= Aston Barrett Jr =

Jamaican multi-instrumentalist and producer

Aston Barrett Jr.
- Also known as: Aston Barrett Jr.
- Born: Aston Francis Barrett Jr. 20 October 1990 (age 35); Kingston, Jamaica
- Genre: Reggae
- Occupations: musician, arranger, record producer
- Instruments: Drums, Bass, organ
- Years active: 2009–present
- Website: https://www.astonbarrettjr.com/

Aston Francis Barrett Jr. (born 20 October 1990) is a Jamaican multi-instrumentalist, producer, and actor. He is the drummer and leader of the band The Wailers since 2016.

He is the son of Aston “Familyman” Barrett, who was the bassist and musical director for Bob Marley & The Wailers, nephew of drummer Carlton "Carly" Barrett and grandson of the late Joe Higgs. In 2017, he received a Grammy award as co-producer with Damian Marley for the track "The Struggle Discontinues", featured on the Album Stony Hill, which won the Grammy Award for Best Reggae Album.

In 2018, he joined efforts with the Italian reggae artist Alborosie to co-produce and record the album Unbreakable – Alborosie meets The Wailers.

In 2020, he produced and co-wrote the new album of The Wailers, One World, with producer Emilio Estefan, which was released by Sony Music and received a Grammy Nomination for Best Reggae Album of the Year.

In the 2024 film Bob Marley: One Love, as an actor, Barrett plays the part of his father, Aston "Family Man" Barrett. The film's credits also list him three times as a musician, for playing three different instruments on the soundtrack.

== Early years ==
Born in Kingston, Jamaica, he grew up in a mixed cultured family which was part Rastafari and part Christian.

He first became aware of his family's fame while watching television at the age of 4, when he saw The Wailers performing their 1979 concert in Santa Barbara. Later, he grew up seeing pictures of Bob Marley and hearing his music, and soon realized his significance in reggae music and popularity.

Aston started playing the bass at a very young age, following in the footsteps of his father, Aston ‘Familyman’ Barrett, and trying to emulate his style. His father quickly started teaching him how to play this instrument; beginning a mentor-student relationship that would continue for years.

When he was seven years old he joined his first band, and his father continued to mentor him until Aston moved to the United States, after finishing 5th grade.

Living with his sister in Miami, he joined his school's jazz band, and started to play drums in order to improve his repertoire of skills.

== Musical career ==
He gained his first professional experience while he was still in high school, playing bass for Julian Marley and The Uprising Band. Then, he joined them on their first shows around Florida and the rest of America, and eventually toured with them internationally. The group shared the stage with artists such as Stephen Marley, and Nas. Months later, Lauryn Hill sought him out to become her bassist, and the two collaborated for over two years.

=== Trajectory with The Wailers ===
In 2009 he began accompanying his father on tours with The Wailers, when he would occasionally join the band on stage. In 2016, with the urging of his father, he stepped up to become the leader of the band.

==== One World Album ====
In 2020 he produced and co-written alongside Emilion Estefan and Josh David Barrett The Wailers´ Album One World.

The album was released by Sony Music Latin and received a Grammy Nomination for Best Reggae Album of the Year. It features guest artists such as Julian Marley, Natiruts, Emily Estefan, Kush Gad, Jesse Royal, and Carlinhos Brown.

The first single released from the album, a song titled "One World, One Prayer" had dropped earlier in the year, on 21 May 2020, and featured Farruko, Shaggy, Cedella Marley, and her son, Skip Marley.

=== Evolution (2024) ===
In August 2024, The Wailers released the album Evolution under Crescent Moon Records. The project was produced by Grammy Award-winning producer Emilio Estefan Jr. and featured a lineup of notable reggae artists, including Mykal Rose, Marcia Griffiths, and Gramps Morgan. Aston Barrett Jr. played a central role in the album's creation, serving as the band's leader and primary musician.

Evolution received critical acclaim and was nominated for Best Reggae Album at the 67th Annual Grammy Awards, marking a significant milestone in Aston Barrett Jr.'s career. The nomination underscored his contributions to modern reggae and his efforts in preserving and evolving the sound of The Wailers for a new generation.

== Other projects and recognitions ==
Apart from his role in The Wailers, Aston can also be heard playing guitar, drums, bass, and organ for other artists such as Daniel Marley, Junior Reed, Julian Marley, Kwame Bediaco, Aka Beka, Jessee Royale and Reggae Force. He is also a co-owner of BAD Lions Productions, who operates a studio in Pompano Beach, Florida.

In 2017, he received a Grammy Award as co-producer with Damian Marley for the track "The Struggle Discontinues", featured on the album Stony Hill (Grammy Awarded for Best Reggae Album).

In 2018, he joined with renowned Italian reggae artist Alborosie to co-produce and record the album Unbreakable – Alborosie meets The Wailers.

In 2020, Barrett Jr. played bass and drums for Romain Virgo's Best of Me, produced and played multiple instruments for Kayaman, and worked on the new Reggae Force album.

In November 2024, The Wailers' album Evolution, featuring contributions from Mykal Rose, was nominated for the Grammy Award in the Best Reggae Album category.

On 28 February 2025, Israel Vibration released the album Reggae Music Never Dies, where Barrett Jr. produced and mixed the album, played bass, drums, rhythm guitar, piano, and percussion.
