= You Make Me Wanna (disambiguation) =

You Make Me Wanna may refer to:

- "You Make Me Wanna", song by Dead or Alive from Sophisticated Boom Boom, 1984
- "You Make Me Wanna...", Usher song released in 1997
- "U Make Me Wanna" (Blue song), released in 2003
- "U Make Me Wanna" (Jadakiss song), featuring Mariah Carey and released in 2004
