= Stony Hill (album) =

Studio album by Damian "Jr. Gong" Marley
- Released: July 21, 2017
- Studio: Uncle D's Studios (Miami, FL); Lion's Den Studios (Miami, FL)
- Genre: Reggae; dancehall; reggae fusion
- Length: 1:13:10
- Label: Ghetto Youths International; Republic Records
- Producer: Anju Blaxx; Aston Barrett Jr.; Breyan Isaac; Damian Marley; Di Genius; Keely Keyz; Sean Diedrick; Stephen Marley; Tristan Boston; Victan Edmund

Damian "Jr. Gong" Marley chronology
SuperHeavy (2011)	Stony Hill (2017)

Stony Hill is the fourth solo studio album by Jamaican reggae musician Damian Marley. It was released on July 21, 2017 via Ghetto Youths International and Republic Records. Recording sessions took place at Uncle D's Studios and Lion's Den Studios in Miami, Atlantic Studios in Hollywood, and Henson Studios in Los Angeles. Produced by Anju Blaxx, Aston Barrett Jr., Breyan Isaac, Di Genius, Keely Keyz, Sean Diedrick, Stephen Marley, Tristan Boston, Victan Edmund, and Damian Marley himself. It features guest appearances from Stephen Marley and Major Myjah.

At the 60th Annual Grammy Awards, the album won a Grammy Award for Best Reggae Album.

== Critical reception ==
Professional ratings
Aggregate scores
Source	Rating
Metacritic	72/100
Review scores
Source	Rating
AllMusic	3.5/5 stars
The Guardian	3/5 stars
The Observer	3/5 stars
Rolling Stone	3.5/5 stars

Stony Hill was met with generally favorable reviews from music critics. At Metacritic, which assigns a normalized rating out of 100 to reviews from mainstream publications, the album received an average score of 72 based on five reviews.

AllMusic's Tim Sendra praised the album, stating: "Marley acquits himself well, turning in a strong modern reggae album that's informed by R&B and rap, but is very much its own thing". Will Hermes of Rolling Stone described the album as "an inspiring 18-track collection, flexing authority on roots jams and dancehall bangers, political meditations, and come-ons".

In mixed reviews, Ben Beaumont-Thomas of The Guardian wrote: "lyrically, it's what you might expect, with odes to the medicinal properties of marijuana (Medication), lamplit sweet nothings (Grown and Sexy), and a string of socially conscious lamentations". Tara Joshi of The Observer resumed: "Stony Hill is testament to the timeless consistency of Marley's work".

== Commercial performance ==
In the United States, the album debuted at number 65 on the Billboard 200 and atop the Reggae Albums charts, selling 6,000 copies in its first-week, and became the most popular reggae album of the year 2017 in the US. As of July 2023, Stony Hill has sold 177,000 units of streams and sales in the US according to data obtained from Billboard sales trackers Luminate.

The album also peaked at number 26 in Switzerland, number 57 in Germany, number 58 in Austria, number 81 in the Netherlands, number 94 in the United Kingdom and number 104 in France.

== Track listing ==
No.	Title	Lyrics	Music	Producer(s)	Length
1.	"Intro"	Manley Buchanan	Tristan Boston; Andrew Sayeed Myrie	Anju Blaxx; Tristan Boston; Jr. Gong (add.); Ragga (add.)	1:37
2.	"Here We Go"	Damian Marley; Stephen McGregor; Wayne Marshall	Damian Marley; Dennis Brown; Winston Boswell; Lowell Dunbar; Robbie Shakespeare	Jr. Gong	4:44
3.	"Nail Pon Cross"	D. Marley	D. Marley; Steven Van Zandt	Jr. Gong	3:25
4.	"R.O.A.R."	D. Marley	D. Marley; Sean Diedrick; Mark Anthony Myrie; Albert Forbes; Roderick Hamilton; Craig Serani Marsh; Devon Douglas	Sean Diedrick; Jr. Gong (add.); Ragga (add.)	3:23
5.	"Medication" (featuring Stephen Marley)	D. Marley; Ahmad Balshe; Breyan Isaac	D. Marley; Douglas; S. Diedrick; Ahmad Balshe; Breyan Isaac; Louis Freese; Kim Gordon; Thurston Moore; Lawrence Muggerud; Lee Ranaldo; Senen Reyes; Steven Shelly; George David Weiss; Robert Thiele	Ragga; Breyan Isaac	3:42
6.	"Time Travel"	D. Marley; Devon Douglas	D. Marley; S. Diedrick	Jr. Gong; Sean Diedrick (co.)	2:52
7.	"Living It Up"	D. Marley	D. Marley; Phillip James; S. Diedrick; Shiah Coore; Williard C. Smith; Jeffrey Townes	Jr. Gong	4:00
8.	"Looks Are Deceiving"	D. Marley	D. Marley; Albert Washington Griffiths	Jr. Gong	4:37
9.	"The Struggle Discontinues"	D. Marley; Douglas	D. Marley; S. Diedrick; Aston Barrett Jr.	Jr. Gong; Aston Barrett Jr.	4:39
10.	"Autumn Leaves"	D. Marley	D. Marley; S. Diedrick	Jr. Gong; Michael Einziger (add.); Sean Diedrick (add.)	5:04
11.	"Everybody Wants to Be Somebody"	D. Marley	D. Marley; S. Diedrick; Courtney Diedrick; Coore	Jr. Gong	3:40
12.	"Upholstery" (featuring Major Myjah)	D. Marley; Major Myjah; Daniel McGregor	D. Marley; Stephen McGregor	Di Genius	3:50
13.	"Grown & Sexy" (featuring Stephen Marley)	D. Marley; Stephen Marley	D. Marley; S. Diedrick; Trevor James; Andre Dennis	Jr. Gong	4:04
14.	"Perfect Picture"	D. Marley; S. Marley	D. Marley; Stephen Marley	Ragga	5:21
15.	"So a Child May Follow"	D. Marley; Douglas	D. Marley; Victan Edmund; James; Ricky M.L. Walters	Victan Edmund; Jr. Gong (add.)	4:22
16.	"Slave Mill"	D. Marley	D. Marley; S. Marley; S. McGregor; S. Diedrick	Jr. Gong; Ragga; Di Genius	4:48
17.	"Caution"	D. Marley	D. Marley; Michael Rose	Jr. Gong; Michael Einziger (add.)	3:57
18.	"Speak Life"	D. Marley; Douglas	D. Marley; A. Myrie; Matthew Keaveny	Anju Blaxx; Keely Keyz	5:05
Total length:					1:13:10

Sample credits

- Track 2 contains excerpts from "Here I Come Again" performed by Dennis Brown and excerpts from "Have No Fear" written by Dennis Brown, Winston Boswell, Lowell Dunbar and Robbie Shakespeare.
- Track 3 contains elements of "Solidarity" written by Steven Van Zandt and performed by Black Uhuru.
- Track 4 contains samples from "Me and Oonu" written by Mark Anthony Myrie, Albert Forbes, Roderick Hamilton, Craig Serani Marsh and Devon Andrew Douglas and performed by Buju Banton.
- Track 5 contains interpolation from "I Love You Mary Jane" written by Louis Freese, Kim Gordon, Thurston Moore, Lawrence Muggerud, Lee Ranaldo, Senen Reyes and Steven Shelly, and embodies portions of "What a Wonderful World" written by Robert Thiele and George David Weiss.
- Track 8 contains an interpolation of "Looks Is Deceiving" written by Albert Washington Griffiths.
- Track 17 contains samples from "World Is Africa" written by Michael Rose.

== Charts ==
=== Weekly charts ===
Chart (2017)	Peak position
Austrian Albums (Ö3 Austria)	58
Belgian Albums (Ultratop Flanders)	98
Belgian Albums (Ultratop Wallonia)	184
Dutch Albums (Album Top 100)	81
French Albums (SNEP)	104
German Albums (Offizielle Top 100)	57
Swiss Albums (Schweizer Hitparade)	26
UK Albums (OCC)	94
UK Album Downloads (OCC)	34
US Billboard 200	65
US Reggae Albums (Billboard)	1

=== Year-end charts ===
Chart (2017)	Position
US Reggae Albums (Billboard)	1
