= Feel Something (The History of Apple Pie album) =

Studio album by The History of Apple Pie
- Released: 30 September 2014
- Length: 37:17
- Label: Marshall Teller

The History of Apple Pie chronology
Out of View (2013)	Feel Something (2014)

Singles from Feel Something
- 1. "Don't You Wanna Be Mine" Released: 11 October 2013; 2. "Tame" Released: 11 July 2014

Professional ratings
Aggregate scores
Source	Rating
Metacritic	68/100
Review scores
Source	Rating
AllMusic	4/5 stars
Consequence of Sound	B−
DIY	3/5 stars
Drowned in Sound	8/10
Exclaim!	7/10
Pitchfork	6/10

Feel Something is the second studio album by British band The History of Apple Pie. It was released on 30 September 2014 under Marshall Teller Records.

== Critical reception ==
Feel Something was met with generally favourable reviews from critics. At Metacritic, which assigns a weighted average rating out of 100 to reviews from mainstream publications, this release received an average score of 68, based on 10 reviews.

== Track listing ==
Feel Something track listing
No.	Title	Length
1.	"Come Undone"	3:16
2.	"Tame"	3:29
3.	"Keep Wondering"	4:03
4.	"Special Girl"	3:00
5.	"Jamais Vu"	4:00
6.	"Puzzles"	3:23
7.	"Don't You Wanna Be Mine?"	4:00
8.	"Ordinary Boy"	3:45
9.	"Snowball"	3:23
10.	"Just Like This"	4:58
11.	"Shake (Vinyl only)"	3:32
