= Honey packet =

Controversial honey-based sexual enhancement product

A honey packet (often shortened to "honey pack") is a honey-based dietary supplement sold in single-serve sachets, marketed primarily for male libido and endurance. The product has been condemned by health experts regarding health issues and complications.

== Product description ==
A honey packet or honey pack is a small sachet containing honey and botanicals, advertised online and in some retail outlets for improving sexual performance, maintain an erection, having sexual intercourse for longer before ejaculating, and improving energy and endurance. Despite marketing claims, scientific support for its active ingredients is lacking.

Manufacturers often list ingredients such as royal jelly, tongkat ali, bee pollen, and ginseng to suggest natural efficacy, though there is little clinical evidence validating sexual‑performance claims. The honey packet is also known for containing Viagra and Cialis, two FDA-approved drugs to treat men with erectile dysfunction but are restricted to use under the supervision of licensed health care professionals.

== Controversies ==
=== Health advisory ===
On April 25, 2022, The Food and Drug Administration of the United States advised against purchasing and using Royal Honey VIP due to its potential health risks. Through its automated analysis, the FDA found sildenafil, whose usage is only approved under strict medical guidance. Following this, two companies named MKS Enterprise LLC and Shopaax.com recalled Royal Honey VIP packets from their stores. In 2017 the FDA had issued another warning about the Royal Honey VIP product containing an undisclosed drug ingredient called tadalafil, the active ingredient present in Cialis. In 2018, the FDA had issued a public notification on Royal Honey VIP, saying it contained potentially harmful hidden ingredients that could lead to dangerously low blood pressure if taken with nitrates due to tadalafil and sildenafil dilating blood vessels. If left unchecked, vital organs may not receive an adequate supply of blood and oxygen, and this deficit can lead to shock and irreversible organ damage.
