= It's Not You It's Me =

Song by Chris Brown

from the album Brown
- Released: May 8, 2026
- Genre: R&B
- Length: 3:07
- Label: RCA, CBE
- Lyricists: Chris Brown; Omari Akinlolu; Christopher "Chrishan" Dotson; Ryan Press; Steven Tolson
- Producers: Chrishan; Hitmaka; Kristian Rosendal; Benjamin Lasnier

Audio video
- "It's Not You It's Me" on YouTube

"It's Not You It's Me" is a song by American singer Chris Brown from his twelfth studio album Brown (2026).

== Composition ==
"It's Not You It's Me" is an R&B song where, lyrically, Brown takes accountability for the breakdown of a healthy relationship, attributing it to his internal struggles. According to SoulBounce, the song "finds Brown diving deeper into traditional R&B love song territory with layered vocals and more emotional songwriting." Billboard found the track to be similar to his early work.

== Critical reception ==
Billboard named "It's Not You It's Me" the best song on Brown, writing: "it is another instance on the album where Breezy bares his soul and fits the production to perfection. It almost feels like he made a modern version of his 2005 hit “Say Goodbye,” and it works so well." AllMusic also mentioned the track as a standout on Brown, calling it a "wholly repentant" song.

== Charts ==
Chart performance for "It's Not You It's Me"
| Chart (2026) | Peak position |
|---|---|
| New Zealand Hot Singles (RMNZ) | 6 |
| US Hot R&B/Hip-Hop Songs (Billboard) | 44 |
