= It Depends =

2025 single by Chris Brown featuring Bryson Tiller

Single by Chris Brown featuring Bryson Tiller

from the album Brown
- Released: July 25, 2025
- Recorded: 2025
- Genre: R&B; Bronx drill
- Length: 4:31
- Label: CBE; RCA
- Songwriters: Chris Brown; Bryson Tiller; Ephrem Lopez Jr.; Nicolas Baran; Usher Raymond IV; Jermaine Mauldin; Brian Casey; Manuel Seal; Dewain Whitmore Jr.; Ant Clemons; Elliot Trent; Ryan Press
- Producers: RiotUSA; Nico Baran

Chris Brown singles chronology
"Holy Blindfold" (2025)	"It Depends" (2025)	"WGFT (Remix)" (2026)

Bryson Tiller singles chronology
"Can We Talk?" (2025)	"It Depends" (2025)	"I Need Her" (2025)

Audio video
- "It Depends" on YouTube

"It Depends" is a song by American singer Chris Brown featuring fellow American singer Bryson Tiller. It was released on July 25, 2025, as the second single from Brown's twelfth studio album, Brown. Produced by RiotUSA and Nico Baran, the song contains a sample of "Nice & Slow" by Usher, who later appeared on the song's remix released on October 17, 2025.

"It Depends" was nominated at the 68th Annual Grammy Awards for Best R&B Performance and Best R&B Song.

== Background ==
Chris Brown teased the song on Instagram on July 15, 2025, asking "Should I drop this?" in the captions. The song attracted significant interest from fans, after which he announced the release date on July 23. Its release coincided with the start of the North American leg of Brown's "Breezy Bowl XX" stadium tour.

== Composition ==
"It Depends" is an R&B song with Bronx drill‑inspired percussion. The song finds the singers expressing passionate love toward their respective romantic interests, although the women they are addressing seem to be already involved with someone else. It contains a slowed-down sample of the bridge from Usher's "Nice & Slow", a track that Brown had previously interpolated in his 2017 song "To My Bed".

== Critical reception ==
Zachary Horvath of HotNewHipHop stated "In general, it's nothing too out there for either artist, but they do display some nice chemistry, which they have done on several occasions."

== Remix ==
The remix titled "It Depends (The Remix)", features the artist of the song's sample, American singer Usher. The remix released as promotional single on October 17, 2025.

== Chart performance ==
"It Depends" peaked at number 16 on the Billboard Hot 100 and reached number 3 on the Hot R&B/Hip-Hop Songs chart. Internationally, the single charted at number 51 on the UK Singles Chart and number 39 in New Zealand.

The song rose to No. 1 on Billboard's R&B/Hip-Hop Airplay chart for the week dated November 8, 2025, giving Brown the top two positions simultaneously for the first time as the lead artist, alongside his track "Residuals". The song also marked Brown's 12th No. 1 on the chart, tying him with Lil Wayne for the third-most all-time.

== Charts ==
=== Weekly charts ===
Weekly chart performance for "It Depends"
Chart (2025–2026)	Peak position
Australia Hip Hop/R&B (ARIA)	12
Canada Hot 100 (Billboard)	86
Global 200 (Billboard)	77
Kazakhstan Airplay (TopHit)	77
New Zealand (Recorded Music NZ)	39
Peru Anglo Airplay (Monitor Latino)	13
UK Singles (Official Charts)	51
UK Hip Hop/R&B (Official Charts)	10
US Billboard Hot 100	16
US Hot R&B/Hip-Hop Songs (Billboard)	3
US R&B/Hip-Hop Airplay (Billboard)	1
US Pop Airplay (Billboard)	25
US Rhythmic Airplay (Billboard)	1

Weekly chart performance for "It Depends" (The Remix)
Chart (2025)	Peak position
New Zealand Hot Singles (RMNZ)	10

=== Monthly charts ===
Monthly chart performance for "It Depends"
Chart (2026)	Peak position
Kazakhstan Airplay (TopHit)	88

=== Year-end charts ===
Year-end chart performance for "It Depends"
Chart (2025)	Position
US Hot R&B/Hip-Hop Songs (Billboard)	36

== Certifications ==
Certifications for "It Depends"
Region	Certification	Certified units/sales
New Zealand (RMNZ)	Gold	15,000^{‡}
United States (RIAA)	Gold	500,000^{‡}
^{‡} Sales+streaming figures based on certification alone.

== Release history ==
Release history for "It Depends"
Region	Date	Format(s)	Label(s)	Ref.
United States	September 2, 2025	Rhythmic contemporary radio	CBE; RCA	
United States	October 21, 2025	Contemporary hit radio	CBE; RCA	
