= RoccStar =

American rapper

Roccstar
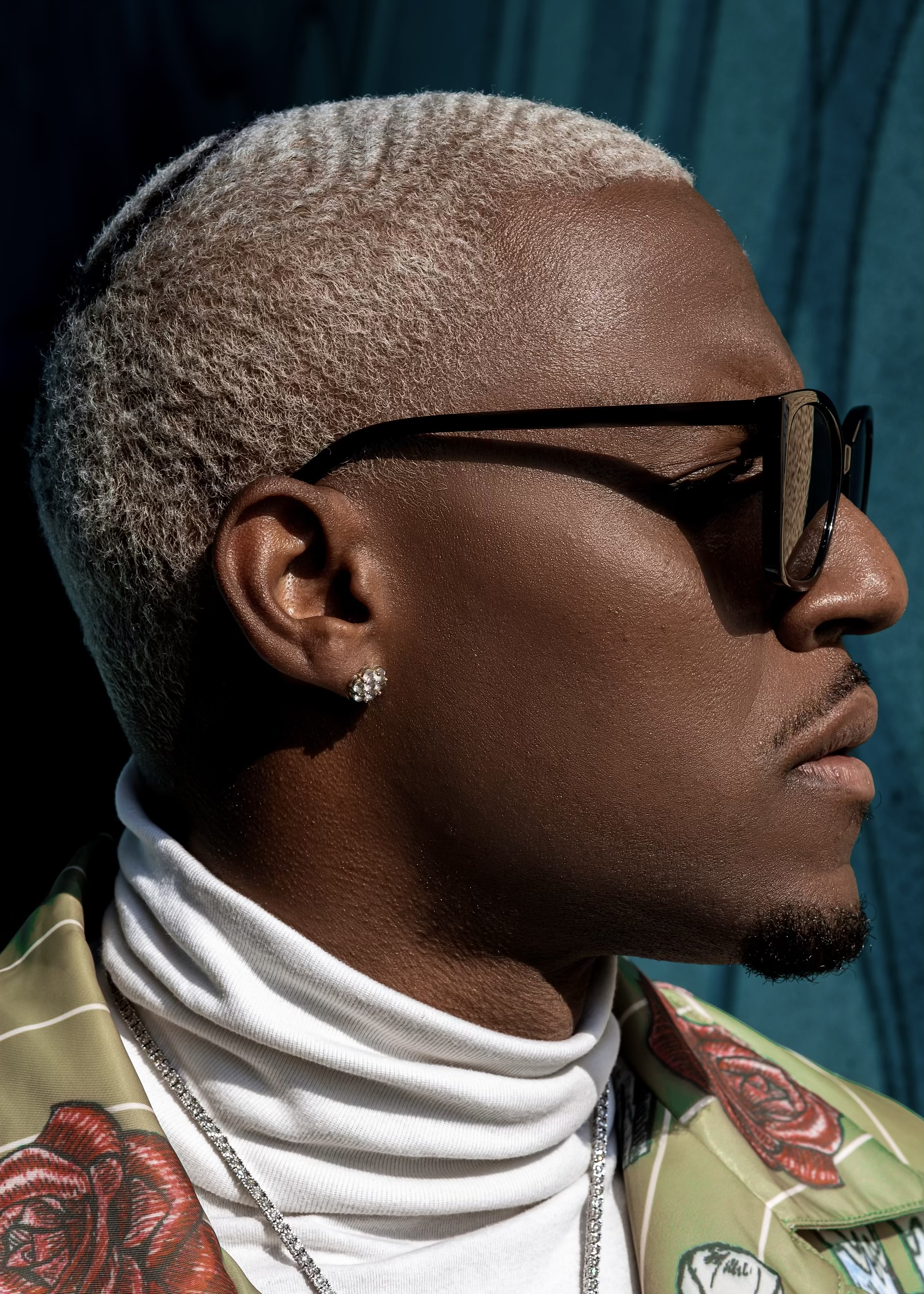
- Roccstar LA shoot 2023

Background information
- Genres: Hip hop, R&B, alternative, pop
- Occupations: Record producer, singer-songwriter
- Labels: Rocc Age, Primary Wave, BMG, Atlantic
- Website: www.iamroccstar.com

Leon "Roccstar" Youngblood Jr. is a Grammy Award winning American music producer, songwriter, recording artist and rapper. Youngblood has written and produced songs for artists such as Chris Brown, Post Malone, Usher, Rita Ora, Fergie, Prince Royce, Kendrick Lamar, J.Lo, and Melissa Etheridge.

He wrote and produced a number of tracks on Chris Brown's album X, which was nominated for Best Urban Contemporary Album Grammy Award in 2014. The Fifty Shades of Grey soundtrack, which featured Youngblood's song "Rude", was also nominated for a Grammy for best soundtrack in December 2015.

Youngblood is signed to Atlantic Records as an artist. The music video for his own debut single, "Confidence", premiered on Billboard in 2014.

Roccstar has also made appearances on the VH1 reality TV shows Love & Hip Hop: Hollywood and Basketball Wives. In total, Roccstar has 9 Grammy nominations.

== Career ==
In 2013, Youngblood began working with Chris Brown, producing and writing alongside Diplo and Timbaland and landing si x songs on Brown's album X, including the lead single, "Fine China". Youngblood wrote multiple tracks for J.Lo's album in 2014, and is currently working with a number of other prominent artists. He formed his own company, called RoccAge Entertainment.

== Selected discography ==
Year	Artist	Title	Record label	Details
2026	Chris Brown	"Won't Let Me Leave" ("Won't Let Me Leave" (Chris Brown song))	RCA Records	Producer, Writer
2026	Chris Brown	"For the Moment" (For the Moment (Chris Brown song))	RCA Records	Producer
2026	Chris Brown ft Sexyy Red	“Call Your Name" (“Call Your Name” (Chris Brown song))	RCA Records	Producer, Writer
2026	Chris Brown	"Theme Song" (Theme Song (Chris Brown song))	RCA Records	Writer
2026	Chris Brown	"Red Rum" (Red Rum' (Chris Brown song))	RCA Records	Producer, Writer
2026	Chris Brown ft Leon Thomas	"Fallin" (Fallin' (Chris Brown song))	RCA Records	Writer
2026	Chris Brown	"Obvious" (Obvious (Chris Brown song))	RCA Records	Producer
2025	India Shawn ft RoccStar	"Wild, Lost & Free" ("Wild, Lost & Free" (The Proud Family: Louder and Prouder: Season 3 (Music from the Series))	Walt Disney Records	Producer, Writer
2025	KeKe Palmer	"Higher" ("Higher" (The Proud Family: Louder and Prouder: Season 3 (Music from the Series)	Walt Disney Records	Producer, Writer
2025	Ne-Yo	"Back To Us" ("Back To Us" The Proud Family: Louder and Prouder: Season 3 (Music from the Series))	Walt Disney Records	Producer, Writer
2025	Tamar Davis	"Betty Davis Theme" ("Betty Davis Theme" (The Proud Family: Louder and Prouder: Season 3 (Music from the Series))	Walt Disney Records	Producer, Writer
2025	Mariah Meshae	"Lovin' Myself (Mariah Version)" ("Lovin' Myself (Mariah Version)" (The Proud Family: Louder and Prouder: Season 3 (Music from the Series))	Walt Disney Records	Producer, Writer
2025	Durand Bernarr	"Lovin' Myself (Durand Version)" ("Lovin' Myself (Durand Version)" (The Proud Family: Louder and Prouder: Season 3 (Music from the Series))	Walt Disney Records	Producer, Writer
2025	Deraj & Kirk Franklin	""Be Alright"" ("Be Alright" (The Proud Family: Louder and Prouder: Season 3 (Music from the Series))	Walt Disney Records	Producer, Writer
2025	Leon Miyachi Pearl	"Doody Booty" ("Doody Booty" (The Proud Family: Louder and Prouder: Season 3 (Music from the Series))	Walt Disney Records	Producer, Writer
2023	Chris Brown	"Feel Something" (11:11 (Chris Brown album))	RCA Records	Producer, Writer
2023	Chris Brown	"Shooter" (11:11 (Chris Brown album))	RCA Records	Producer, Writer
2023	Chris Brown ft Fridayy	"No One Else” (11:11 (Chris Brown album))	RCA Records	Producer
2023	Chris Brown	"Very Special" (11:11 (Chris Brown album))	RCA Records	Producer, Writer
2023	Chris Brown	"Messed Up" (11:11 (Chris Brown album))	RCA Records	Producer, Writer
2023	Chris Brown	"Red Flags” (11:11 (Chris Brown album))	RCA Records	Producer, Writer
2023	Chris Brown	"Angel Numbers / Ten Toes"(11:11 (Chris Brown album))	RCA Records	Producer, Writer
2023	Chris Brown	"Summer Too Hot" (11:11 (Chris Brown album))	RCA Records	Producer, Writer
2022	Chris Brown ft Wizkid	"Call Me Every Day" (Breezy)	RCA Records	Producer
2022	Chris Brown ft Lil Durk and Capella Grey	"Till the Wheels Fall Off"(Breezy)	RCA Records	Producer, Writer
2022	Chris Brown ft Lil Baby	"Addicted" (Breezy )	RCA Records	Producer
2022	Chris Brown ft Bryson Tiller	"Need You Right Here" (Breezy )	RCA Records	Producer, Writer
2022	Chris Brown	"Survive the Night" (Breezy )	RCA Records	Producer, Writer
2022	Chris Brown ft Angel Brinks	"Luckiest Man" (Breezy)	RCA Records	Producer, Writer
2022	Ne-Yo	"You Got the Body" (Self Explanatory)	Motown	Producer, Writer
2022	Mary J. Blige	"Love Will Never" (Good Morning Gorgeous)	300	Writer
2022	Ne-Yo	"U 2 Luv" (Self Explanatory)	Motown	Writer
2019	Chris Brown	"Troubled Waters" (Indigo)	RCA Records	Writer, Producer
2018	Post Malone	"Zack and Codeine" (Beerbongs & Bentleys)	Republic Records	Producer
2017	Fergie	"Just Like You" (Double Dutchess)	Dutchess, BMG	Producer, writer
2017	Fergie	"Kleopatra" (Double Dutchess)	Dutchess, BMG	Producer, writer
2015	Terence Coles, RoccStar	"Rude" (Fifty Shades of Grey: Original Motion Picture Soundtrack)	Republic Records	Producer, writer, artist
2015	Prince Royce	"With You" (Double Vision)	RCA Records	Writer
2015	Chris Brown ft. Rihanna, Wiz Khalifa, and Kelly	"Counterfeit" (Before the Party mixtape)	--	Producer, writer
2015	Chris Brown	Second Hand Love (Before the Party mixtape)	--	Producer, writer
2015	Chris Brown	"Sex" (Before the Party mixtape)	--	Producer, writer
2014	Usher	"Clueless"	RCA Records	Producer, writer
2014	Jasmine V	"I Love Your Crazy"	Interscope Records	Producer, writer
2014	Chris Brown	"Fine China" (X)	RCA Records	Producer, writer
2014	Chris Brown	"X" (X)	RCA Records	Writer
2014	Chris Brown	"Add Me In" (X)	RCA Records	Writer
2014	Chris Brown	"Stereotype" (X)	RCA Records	Writer
2014	Chris Brown ft Kendrick Lamar	"Autumn Leaves" (X)	RCA Records	Producer, writer
2014	Chris Brown	"Body Shots" (X)	RCA Records	Writer
2014	Jennifer Lopez	"A.K.A." (A.K.A.)	Capitol Records	Producer, writer
2014	Jennifer Lopez featuring Iggy Azalea	"Acting Like That" (A.K.A.)	Capitol Records	Producer, writer
2014	Jennifer Lopez	"So Good" (A.K.A.)	Capitol Records	Producer, writer
2014	Jennifer Lopez	"Charades" (A.K.A.)	Capitol Records	Producer, writer
2014	Melissa Etheridge	"Ain't That Bad"	ME Records	Producer, writer
2013	K Koke featuring Rita Ora	"Lay Down Your Weapons" (single)	RCA Records	Producer, writer
