= For the Moment (Chris Brown song) =

Song by Chris Brown

from the album Brown
- Released: May 8, 2026
- Genre: New wave; synth-pop; alternative rock
- Length: 3:26
- Label: RCA, CBE
- Lyricist: Chris Brown
- Producers: Clifton Haralson; RoccStar

Music video
- "For the Moment" on YouTube

"For the Moment" is a song by American singer Chris Brown from his twelfth studio album Brown (2026).

== Critical reception ==
Billboard praised the "rock aura" of the song, saying: "The vocal filtering in the hook and synths feels like he may have been listening to a bunch of old-school alternative bands. If that is the case, more of that — because it was very distinct and he executed it well in his own way. The bridge is especially enjoyable, too." Complex also complimented the track, defining it a "mid-tempo bop".

== Music video ==
"For the Moment"'s official music video was released on the same day as the album Brown. It was directed by the singer's frequent collaborator Travis Colbert. The video features Brown and his dance crew executing complex choreographies with "dark" evil clown makeup on their faces, alongside Nitro Circus athletes performing stunts. The video showcases freestyle motocross and acrobatic sequences, as well as scenes incorporating fire effects and pole-dancers. Complex praised it for being "packed with spectacular stunts, freestyle skills, and a ring of fire", ultimately calling the video "one hell of a ride".

== Charts ==
Chart performance for "For the Moment"
Chart (2026)	Peak position
Australia Hip Hop/R&B (ARIA)	17
New Zealand Hot Singles (RMNZ)	2
Nigeria Airplay (TurnTable)	83
South Africa Streaming (TOSAC)	41
US Billboard Hot 100	85
US Hot R&B/Hip-Hop Songs (Billboard)	28
