= Feel Something (Chris Brown song) =

2023 song by Chris Brown

Song by Chris Brown

from the album 11:11
- Released: November 10, 2023
- Recorded: 2023
- Genre: R&B
- Length: 3:12
- Label: RCA; CBE
- Songwriters: Chris Brown; Kesington Kross; Keith Ingram; Toney Martinez; Marcus Berry
- Producers: RoccStar; Prince Youngblood; Gabriel Roland

Music video
- "Feel Something" on YouTube

"Feel Something" is a song by American singer Chris Brown, taken from his eleventh studio album, 11:11, released on November 10, 2023.

== Critical reception ==
Angel Diaz of Billboard highlighted the song among the best tracks on 11:11. Similarly, Brian McCollum of Detroit Free Press wrote that “the celestial soul of ‘Feel Something’ was the best of several songs drawn from 11:11.”

== Music video ==
The music video for "Feel Something" was directed by Jamar Harding, and released on May 31, 2024. The storyline of the visual follows the end of Brown's previous “Press Me” music video, and features a sexual scenario.

== Charts ==
Chart performance for "Feel Something"
Chart (2023)	Peak position
US Hot R&B Songs (Billboard)	17
