= Breezy Bowl XX =

2025 concert tour by Chris Brown

- Tour by Chris Brown
- Location: Europe; North America
- Start date: June 8, 2025
- End date: October 16, 2025
- Legs: 2
- No. of shows: 49
- Supporting acts: Summer Walker; Bryson Tiller; Jhené Aiko
- Attendance: 1.98 million
- Box office: $295.5 million

Chris Brown concert chronology
- The 11:11 Tour (2024); Breezy Bowl XX (2025); The R&B Tour (2026)

The Breezy Bowl XX was the twelfth concert tour by American singer Chris Brown, a stadium tour staged in Europe and North America. The tour earned $295.5 million and sold 1.98 million tickets over 49 shows, making it the highest-grossing tour to date by a solo Black American male artist.

The European leg began on June 8, 2025, in Amsterdam at Johan Cruyff Arena, and ended in Paris on July 5, 2025. The North American leg began on July 30 in Miami and concluded on October 16 in New Orleans. The "Breezy Bowl XX" received critical acclaim, with reviewers describing it as a demonstration of Brown's talents and his continued prominence in R&B, hip-hop and pop music. The tour is cited as being Brown's first stadium tour.

== Background ==
During the penultimate performance of the North American leg of his "The 11:11 Tour" in Los Angeles on August 6, 2024, Brown concluded the show with the statement, "See you next year," implying the possibility of upcoming performances or a forthcoming tour. Media outlets speculated about a tour to commemorate the 20th anniversary of his debut album. In December 2024, he hosted four sold out stadium concerts (two at Johannesburg's FNB Stadium, and two at Allianz Parque Stadium in São Paulo, Brazil) which his fans collectively dubbed the "Breezy Bowl." On March 25, 2025, Brown posted "BIG ANNOUNCEMENT THURSDAY" on Instagram Stories, signing off with "XX", the Roman numeral for 20. Two days later on Instagram, Brown announced the "Breezy Bowl XX Stadium World Tour," to start on June 8 in Amsterdam, followed by stops in Hamburg, Manchester, and London, wrapping up in Paris on July 5. The North American leg was announced to start July 30 in Miami, with stops in cities like Detroit, Washington, D.C., Toronto, Philadelphia, and Atlanta. R&B singers Summer Walker and Bryson Tiller were unveiled as special guests, though Walker's appearances were limited to U.S. dates. In April 2025, he announced additional dates and singer Jhené Aiko as another guest.

On May 15, 2025, Brown was arrested the same day he landed in Manchester, England, on a 2023 warrant issued against him for a grievous bodily harm charge. The charge resulted from an alleged incident which involved Brown smashing a Don Julio tequila bottle over music producer Abraham Diaw's head while at a London nightclub on February 19, 2023. Brown would then be detained by London's Metropolitan Police. On May 16, the Manchester Magistrates' Court ordered Brown to remain in custody until at least June 13, 2025, when his case will be heard before the Southwark Crown court in London, potentially jeopardizing the tour. On May 21, 2025, Brown was released on £5 million bail by the London court and was permitted to commence his world tour next month in accordance with his bail conditions. Following his release, the singer wrote on his Instagram Story: "From the cage to the stage. Breezy bowl", confirming that his world tour will start as planned on June 8th in Amsterdam.

== Show format and production ==
The "Breezy Bowl XX" featured four thematic acts, the Rise, the Fall, Fantasy, and Legacy, with Brown performing more than 50 songs spanning his career. The main stage featured multiple LED screens, flame effects, lasers, pyro, and a cross-shaped catwalk. Two massive inflatable statues of Brown—one representing his younger self and another his present-day image—flanked the stage. A smaller satellite stage allowed for more intimate moments. The visuals included video sequences. One segment featured a montage of tabloid headlines and past arrests as Brown confronted his own controversies. An Egyptian theme was present during "No Guidance." Brown's performances combined his singing and signature choreography, performed alongside his dancing crew.

During the show, Brown also performed aerial stunts while singing "Wall to Wall" and "Look at Me Now", flying over the audience using a rigging harness. Slower songs like “Residuals” and “Don't Judge Me” had performances accompanied by subdued lighting and minimalist staging to emphasize the emotional content, while pyrotechnic effects were incorporated during “New Flame”. During the song "Take You Down," the singer invited a female fan on stage and engaged in a sexually suggestive dance with her, sometimes culminating in a kiss. Brown changed costumes with outfits tailored to each act’s theme. During the "Legacy" part of the show, he wore a Michael Jackson–inspired outfit complete with a fedora.

== Critical reception ==
The tour received positive reviews from critics. In an editorial about the tour, Craig Jenkins of Vulture argued that it "makes an unsubtle case for the singer as a pivotal force in R&B, hip-hop, and pop by barreling through dozens of disparate highlights (...) His voice spirits a lot of people away to happier, less haunted times. And the glimmer of lost innocence in his tone has proved much more magnetic than anything he has done to throw the audience off." Osvaldo Espino of Miami New Times wrote that Brown's July 30 concert was “a testament to his staying power as a performer,” adding, “The moment he took the stage, it became crystal clear: Brown is still one of the most captivating entertainers in the world.”

The Detroit Free Press praised the August 7 concert, noting that "the show’s midsection boasted some of his top vocal showcases, highlighting his tight runs and dynamic range." Similarly, MLive commended the overall Detroit performance: "The most jaw-dropping moment came late in the night when Brown flew through the air on a rig that carried him at least 50 feet above the stage. Brown swung through the skies, dangling over the crowd while continuing to sing before landing on one of the lighting towers." Billboard echoed the sentiment following the August 13 show in New Jersey, calling it a "electrifying display of pop star power." The outlet noted that "Brown repeatedly thanked his supporters—over, and over, and over again—showing an unwavering loyalty to the people who held him up while he was down. That energy was tangible at MetLife, as fans returned the love and praise with cheers and applause".

Now described the August 20 performance at Toronto’s Rogers Stadium as “a night to remember,” praising Brown for delivering “ultimate R&B vibes” despite a downpour that began just as his set started. The review noted that “Brown gave us an unforgettable performance and proved why his name is mentioned in conversations surrounding Best Performers of All Time,” highlighting his aerial stunts, throwback hits, and “Take You Down” serenade in the middle of the storm.

== Commercial performance ==
The Breezy Bowl XX Tour amassed $295.5 million in total revenue and sold nearly two million tickets (1.98 million) across 49 shows worldwide, becoming the highest-grossing tour ever by a solo Black American male artist. Of that total, $47.8 million and 490,000 tickets came from its European leg, while $247.8 million and 1.5 million tickets were generated from North American stadium dates. The trek marked Brown’s first full-scale stadium tour and represented a 201% increase in gross revenue compared to 2024’s The 11:11 Tour, and a 39% rise from his 2023 Under the Influence Tour in Europe.

According to Billboard Boxscore, it was one of 2025’s highest-grossing tours, and the biggest of his career up to that point, joining Beyoncé and Bad Bunny as one of only three artists to surpass $90 million in reported monthly earnings more than once since the Billboard’s Top Tours chart launched in 2019. The tour topped Billboard’s Top Tours chart for August, September and October 2025, grossing $98.1 million in September alone from 13 shows across 10 U.S. cities and selling 580,000 tickets. Three cities, Arlington, Inglewood, and Las Vegas, each reported grosses exceeding $10 million, with Inglewood’s two-night stand at SoFi Stadium earning $16.3 million, one of the top 10 boxscores of the month.

== Set list ==
This set list is representative of the show on June 8, 2025, in Amsterdam. It does not represent all concerts for the duration of the tour.

The Rise

1. "Run It!"
2. "Gimme That"
3. "Party"
4. "Love More"
5. "Ayo"
6. "Go Girlfriend"
7. "Heat"
8. "New Flame"
9. "Yo (Excuse Me Miss)"
10. "Yeah 3x"
11. "Five More Hours"
12. "Iffy"
13. "I Can Transform Ya"

The Fall

14. "Ten Toes"
15. "Grass Ain't Greener"
16. "Liquor"
17. "Deuces"
18. "I Wanna Be"
19. "Ain't No Way (You Won't Love Me)"
20. "She Ain't You"
21. "Say Goodbye"
22. "Residuals"
23. "Don't Judge Me"
24. "Till The Wheels Fall Off"
25. "X"

Fantasy

26. "Wall to Wall"
27. "Take You Down"
28. "Back to Sleep"
29. "2012"
30. "Ya Man Ain't Me"
31. "With You"
32. "Indigo"
33. "Kiss Kiss"
34. "Look at Me Now"
35. "Beautiful People"
36. "Privacy"
37. "No Bullshit"
38. "Burgundy"
39. "Feel Something"
40. "Hope You Do"
41. "Sweet Love"
42. "Under the Influence"
43. "I Love U"
44. "Freaky Friday"
45. "Biggest Fan"

Legacy

46. "Loyal"
47. "Poppin'"
48. "Fine China"
49. "Don't Wake Me Up"
50. "Turn Up the Music"
51. "Call Me Every Day"
52. "Sensational"
53. "Go Crazy"
54. "No Guidance"

Encore

55. "Crawl"
56. "No Air"
57. "Forever"

== Dates ==
List of 2025 concerts
Date (2025)	City	Country	Venue	Opening acts	Attendance	Revenue
June 8	Amsterdam	Netherlands	Johan Cruyff Arena	Bryson Tiller	49,735 / 49,735	$5,355,379
June 11	Hamburg	Germany	Volksparkstadion	Bryson Tiller	42,175 / 42,175	$4,053,493
June 13	Frankfurt	Germany	Deutsche Bank Park	Bryson Tiller	42,569 / 42,569	$4,752,308
June 15	Manchester	United Kingdom	Co-op Live	Bryson Tiller	62,234 / 62,234 (Note: Combined totals for all Manchester shows.)	$9,002,791
June 16	Manchester	United Kingdom	Co-op Live	Bryson Tiller	62,234 / 62,234	$9,002,791
June 19	Cardiff	United Kingdom	Principality Stadium	Bryson Tiller	46,019 / 46,019	$4,128,619
June 21	London	United Kingdom	Tottenham Hotspur Stadium	Bryson Tiller	96,981 / 96,981	$13,787,320
June 22	London	United Kingdom	Tottenham Hotspur Stadium	Bryson Tiller	96,981 / 96,981	$13,787,320
June 24	Manchester	United Kingdom	Co-op Live	Bryson Tiller	—	—
June 26	Birmingham	United Kingdom	Villa Park	Bryson Tiller	40,591 / 40,591	$5,692,221
June 28	Dublin	Ireland	Marlay Park	Bryson Tiller	31,786 / 31,786	$2,928,091
July 1	Glasgow	United Kingdom	Hampden Park	Bryson Tiller	36,923 / 36,923	$3,919,601
July 3	Manchester	United Kingdom	Co-op Live	Bryson Tiller	—	—
July 5	Nanterre (Note: Labeled as Paris in promotional material.)	France	Paris La Défense Arena	Bryson Tiller	41,112 / 41,112	$4,880,630
July 30	Miami	United States	LoanDepot Park	Summer Walker; Bryson Tiller	37,810 / 37,810	$6,105,450
August 2	Tampa	United States	Raymond James Stadium	Summer Walker; Bryson Tiller	51,146 / 51,146	$8,824,943
August 5	Hershey	United States	Hersheypark Stadium	Summer Walker; Bryson Tiller	27,168 / 27,168	$4,641,187
August 7	Detroit	United States	Ford Field	Summer Walker; Bryson Tiller	90,437 / 90,437	$14,619,415
August 8	Detroit	United States	Ford Field	Summer Walker; Bryson Tiller	90,437 / 90,437	$14,619,415
August 10 (Note: This show was originally scheduled for August 16, but was moved forward to August 10.)	Philadelphia	United States	Citizens Bank Park	Summer Walker; Bryson Tiller	41,481 / 41,481	$7,312,825
August 12	East Rutherford	United States	MetLife Stadium	Summer Walker; Bryson Tiller	107,256 / 107,256	$15,001,827
August 13	East Rutherford	United States	MetLife Stadium	Summer Walker; Bryson Tiller	107,256 / 107,256	$15,001,827
August 19	Toronto	Canada	Rogers Stadium	Summer Walker; Bryson Tiller	87,127 / 87,127	$13,982,665
August 20	Toronto	Canada	Rogers Stadium	Summer Walker; Bryson Tiller	87,127 / 87,127	$13,982,665
August 23	East Hartford	United States	Pratt & Whitney Stadium at Rentschler Field	Bryson Tiller	32,158 / 32,158	$5,226,469
August 25	Boston	United States	Fenway Park	Summer Walker; Bryson Tiller	36,124 / 36,124	$5,605,268
August 28	Chicago	United States	Wrigley Field	Summer Walker; Bryson Tiller	37,826 / 37,826	$6,827,316
August 30	Cumberland (Note: Labeled as Atlanta in promotional material.)	United States	Truist Park	Summer Walker; Bryson Tiller	79,230 / 79,230	$14,780,055
August 31	Cumberland	United States	Truist Park	Summer Walker; Bryson Tiller	79,230 / 79,230	$14,780,055
September 2	Arlington	United States	Globe Life Field	Summer Walker; Bryson Tiller	77,013 / 77,013	$13,981,852
September 3	Arlington	United States	Globe Life Field	Summer Walker; Bryson Tiller	77,013 / 77,013	$13,981,852
September 5	St. Louis	United States	The Dome at America's Center	Summer Walker; Bryson Tiller	47,014 / 47,014	$7,852,085
September 8	Houston	United States	Daikin Park	Summer Walker; Bryson Tiller	40,340 / 40,340	$8,273,801
September 11	Phoenix	United States	Chase Field	Summer Walker; Bryson Tiller	47,476 / 47,476	$8,007,329
September 13	Inglewood (Note: Labeled as Los Angeles in promotional material.)	United States	SoFi Stadium	Summer Walker; Bryson Tiller	95,300 / 95,300	$16,308,156
September 14	Inglewood	United States	SoFi Stadium	Summer Walker; Bryson Tiller	95,300 / 95,300	$16,308,156
September 17	San Diego	United States	Petco Park	Summer Walker; Bryson Tiller	41,651 / 41,651	$6,159,446
September 19	Paradise (Note: Labeled as Las Vegas in promotional material.)	United States	Allegiant Stadium	Summer Walker; Bryson Tiller	89,658 / 89,658	$15,848,974
September 20	Paradise	United States	Allegiant Stadium	Summer Walker; Bryson Tiller	89,658 / 89,658	$15,848,974
September 24	Denver	United States	Coors Field	Jhené Aiko; Bryson Tiller	43,590 / 43,590	$6,144,585
September 27	San Antonio	United States	Alamodome	Jhené Aiko; Bryson Tiller	48,938 / 48,938	$8,213,958
September 30	Orlando	United States	Camping World Stadium	Jhené Aiko; Bryson Tiller	46,907 / 46,907	$7,274,889
October 3	Atlanta	United States	Bobby Dodd Stadium	Jhené Aiko; Bryson Tiller	41,315 / 41,315	$6,668,368
October 5	Washington, D.C.	United States	Nationals Park	Jhené Aiko; Bryson Tiller	121,192 / 121,192	$20,657,373
October 8	Washington, D.C.	United States	Nationals Park	Jhené Aiko; Bryson Tiller	121,192 / 121,192	$20,657,373
October 9	Washington, D.C.	United States	Nationals Park	Jhené Aiko; Bryson Tiller	121,192 / 121,192	$20,657,373
October 11	Birmingham	United States	Protective Stadium	Jhené Aiko; Bryson Tiller	34,379 / 34,379	$5,261,975
October 14	Raleigh	United States	Carter–Finley Stadium	Jhené Aiko; Bryson Tiller	43,373 / 43,373	$7,222,267
October 16	New Orleans	United States	Caesars Superdome	Jhené Aiko; Bryson Tiller	45,474 / 45,474	$7,003,815
Total					1,981,508 / 1,981,508 (100%)	$297,303,955

=== Canceled dates ===
Date	City	Country	Venue	Reason
July 9 (Note: The July 9 concert is a part of the Afro Nation festival.)	Portimão	Portugal	Praia da Rocha	Legal issues
August 23	Montreal	Canada	Parc Jean-Drapeau	Venue renovations
October 18	Memphis	United States	Simmons Bank Liberty Stadium	Venue renovations

== See also ==
- List of Billboard Boxscore number-one concert series of the 2020s
