= Major Myjah =

Jamaican-American musician

- Origin: Jamaica
- Occupations: Singer, musician, songwriter
- Instruments: Vocals, guitar, piano
- Label: Roc Nation
- Website: Official website

Major Myjah is an American singer-songwriter, musician, producer and recording artist. He has collaborated with artists that include Usher, Chris Brown, Drake, Davido, Miguel, Pi'erre Bourne, Dexta Daps, Asher Roth, 2 Chainz, Blxst, Sevyn Streeter, Dame Dillard, and Steflon Don, among others. He won a Grammy Award in 2023 for his collaboration with Chris Brown. Major's latest release, "Gyal Code", alongside Davo and producer Crawba Genius, is a smooth, bass-heavy banger that finds Major tapping into his dancehall bloodline. "Gyal Code" is a refreshing dancehall bop and a stark contrast to his previous releases, which blur the lines sonically between R&B, Hip-hop and pop.

== Early life ==
Major is the son of Jamaican reggae and dancehall deejay Bounty Killer and his mother is a talent manager, concert promoter and music industry executive. He was raised in Miami, Florida. and later in Los Angeles, but spent his summers with his dad in Jamaica. Myjah is his birth name but he was called "Major Myjah" by reggae legend Freddie McGregor which he uses as his moniker.

== Career ==
Major began composing songs at the tender age of four and was performing on stage at the age of nine, including performing with artist Junior Reid, He toured with Asher Roth, Ky-Mani Marley and later with Ro James and in his early teens, he also learned how to play the piano and guitar. He released his first single, "My Sunshine," at the age of 13. The song received massive radio play in Europe, Asia, and Jamaica.

In 2015, he released the single "Trouble". The same year, he released the EP Trouble which was a mix of R&B, hip-hop, and pop. Other singles on the EP including "Chemical Kids," "Disposable," "Walk Away," and "Ground Zero." He was featured on the song "Upholstery" on the 2017 Damian Marley album Stony Hill, which won a Grammy Award for Best Reggae Album. In 2018, he was featured on the singles "ATA", "Birthday", and "Say What U Want" on Usher's album A.

Major is credited as a songwriter on the 2023 Chris Brown single "Summer Too Hot" which won a Grammy Award for Best R&B Performance. In 2024, Myjah signed to the record label Roc Nation and also released the singles "Tryin'" and "Exes.".

== Discography ==
=== Extended plays ===
- 2015, Trouble

=== Singles ===
Solo artist

Year	Title	Ref
2024	"Exes"	
2024	"Trying"	

Collaborations

Year	Title	Role	Ref
2023	"Summer Too Hot"	Lyrics on Chris Brown single	
2023	"Vlad TV"	Lyrics on 2 Chainz single	
2019	"Track Meet"	Lyrics on Damian Lillard single	
2017	"Upholstery"	Lyrics on Damian Marley single	
2017	"Bad Lil Vibe"	Lyrics on Kid Ink single	
2014	"Last of the Flohicans"	Featured in the video for Asher Roth single	

== Awards and nominations ==
- Won – 2023, Best R&B Performance, "Summer Too Hot", Chris Brown *Won – 2018, Grammy Award for Best Reggae Album
