= Gimme That =

Single by Chris Brown featuring Lil Wayne

from the album Chris Brown
- Released: April 11, 2006
- Studio: Criteria Recording Studio, Miami
- Genre: Crunk&B; hip-hop
- Length: 3:07
- Label: Jive; Zomba
- Songwriters: Scott Storch; Sean Garrett; Dwayne Carter
- Producer: Scott Storch

Chris Brown singles chronology
"Yo (Excuse Me Miss)" (2005)	"Gimme That" (2006)	"Say Goodbye" (2006)

Lil Wayne singles chronology
"Shooter" (2006)	""Gimme That" (Remix)" (2006)	"Stuntin' Like My Daddy" (2006)

Music video
- "Gimme That" on YouTube

"Gimme That" is a song by American singer Chris Brown featuring American rapper Lil Wayne. It was written by Sean Garrett and Scott Storch for Brown's eponymous debut album (2005), while production was helmed by Storch, with Garrett credited as a co-producer. A remix of the song, featuring additional vocals from American rapper Lil Wayne, was released as the album's third single in April 2006 and peaked at number 15 on the US Billboard Hot 100 chart.

== Background ==
"Gimme That" was written by Sean Garrett and Scott Storch for Brown's eponymous debut album (2005). Production was helmed by Storch. Garrett was credited as a co-producer. In interviews from 2006, Brown considered choosing the song as the second single from his debut album, but the song "Yo (Excuse Me Miss)" was chosen as the single instead. Along with that, "Gimme That" was also featured at the end of the "Yo (Excuse Me Miss)" music video. The single version features rapper Lil Wayne.

== Chart performance ==
The song debuted at number 80 on the US Billboard Hot 100 on April 11, 2006, and climbed the charts to peak at number 15 on June 6, 2006. On November 22, 2017, the single was certified double platinum by the Recording Industry Association of America (RIAA) for sales of over two million copies in the United States.

== Music video ==
A music video for "Gimme That" was directed by Erik White, who had previously directed Brown's visuals for "Run It!" and "Yo (Excuse Me Miss)". Shot at the Los Angeles Union Station in Downtown Los Angeles, it was largely inspired by Michael Jackson's music videos for "Smooth Criminal" and "You Rock My World." As of June 2024, "Gimme That" has received over 250 million views on YouTube.

The music video begins with Brown walking into the station. After catching the eye of a girl near him, he falls asleep listening to "Poppin'" on his Sony Walkman Bean. In his dream, the station transforms into a 1920s Harlem setting, with him a business man and the girl a rich snobby woman. At the end, Brown and the girl almost kiss but he is woken up by Lil Wayne.

== Track listing ==
European CD single
No.	Title	Writer(s)	Producer(s)	Length
1.	"Gimme That" (Remix) (featuring Lil Wayne)	Scott Storch; Sean Garrett; Dwayne Carter	Storch; Garrett^{[a]}	3:57
2.	"Gimme That"	Storch; Garrett	Storch; Garrett^{[a]}	3:06

Notes

- ^{^[a]} signifies co-producer(s)

== Credits and personnel ==
- Vocals: Chris Brown and Dwayne Carter
- Writers: Dwayne Carter, Scott Storch and Sean Garrett
- Mastered by: Herb Powers Jr
- Assistant engineer: Patrick Magee
- Guitar: Aaron Fishbein
- Mixed by: Brian Stanley and Val Braithwaite (assistant)
- Photography: Clay Patrick McBride
- Recorded by: Charles McCrorey, Carlos Paucar, Conrad Golding and Wayne Allison

== Charts ==
=== Weekly charts ===
Weekly chart performance for "Gimme That"
Chart (2006)	Peak position
Czech Republic Airplay (ČNS IFPI)	19
France (SNEP)	45
Germany (GfK)	47
Ireland (IRMA)	26
Netherlands (Single Top 100)	94
Scottish Singles Sales (Official Charts)	29
Switzerland (Schweizer Hitparade)	30
UK Singles (Official Charts)	23
UK Hip Hop/R&B (Official Charts)	7
US Billboard Hot 100	15
US Hot R&B/Hip-Hop Songs (Billboard)	5
US Pop Airplay (Billboard)	22
US Rhythmic Airplay (Billboard)	6

=== Year-end charts ===
2006 year-end chart performance for "Gimme That"
Chart (2006)	Position
US Billboard Hot 100	69
US Hot R&B/Hip-Hop Songs (Billboard)	42
US Rhythmic (Billboard)	33

2007 year-end chart performance for "Gimme That"
Chart (2007)	Position
Brazil (Crowley)	58

== Certifications ==
Certifications for "Gimme That"
Region	Certification	Certified units/sales
Brazil (Pro-Música Brasil)	Platinum	60,000^{*}
New Zealand (RMNZ)	Platinum	30,000^{‡}
United Kingdom (BPI)	Silver	200,000^{‡}
United States (RIAA)	2× Platinum	2,000,000^{‡}
United States (RIAA) (Mastertone)	Gold	500,000^{^}
^{*} Sales figures based on certification alone.^{^} Shipments figures based on certification alone.^{‡} Sales+streaming figures based on certification alone.
