= Chris Brown (album) =

2005 studio album by Chris Brown

Studio album by Chris Brown
- Released: November 29, 2005
- Recorded: February–May 2005
- Genre: R&B
- Length: 59:01
- Label: CBE; Jive
- Producer: Chris Brown; Tina Davis; Mark Pitts; Scott Storch; Jermaine Dupri; Bryan-Michael Cox; WyldCard; The Underdogs; Dre & Vidal; Shea Taylor; Cool & Dre; Sean Garrett; Christopher Young; Shannon "Slam" Lawrence; Oak Felder; Eddie Hustle; LRoc; Antonio Dixon; Mike Winans; Lance Bennett

Chris Brown chronology
Chris Brown (2005)	Exclusive (2007)

Alternative cover
- International cover

Singles from Chris Brown
- 1. "Run It!" Released: June 30, 2005; 2. "Yo (Excuse Me Miss)" Released: December 13, 2005; 3. "Gimme That (Remix)" Released: May 7, 2006; 4. "Say Goodbye" Released: August 8, 2006; 5. "Poppin'" Released: November 21, 2006

Chris Brown is the debut studio album by American singer Chris Brown, released on November 29, 2005, through Jive Records. The production on the album was handled by multiple producers including Scott Storch, Cool & Dre, Oak Felder, Bryan-Michael Cox and the Underdogs among others. The album also features guest appearances by Juelz Santana, Lil Wayne, Bow Wow, Jermaine Dupri and more.

The album was recorded between February and May 2005, after Brown got discovered at the age of 13, subsequently signing with Jive Records two years later. Chris Brown is an R&B album that focuses on teenage lovelife. Upon its release, the album received a generally positive critical reception, that highlighted Brown as a promising figure; however, some retrospective reviews have praised it even more for its role in ushering in a new generation of R&B artists, crediting Chris Brown as a defining release in 2000s R&B music.

Chris Brown was supported by five singles: "Run It!", "Yo (Excuse Me Miss)", "Gimme That (Remix)", "Say Goodbye" and "Poppin'". "Run It!" topped the US Billboard Hot 100, while "Yo (Excuse Me Miss)" and "Say Goodbye" entered the top ten. The album was a commercial success and debuted at number two on the US Billboard 200 chart, selling 154,000 copies in its first week. It has been certified quadruple platinum by the Recording Industry Association of America (RIAA). At the 49th Grammy Awards, the album earned Brown his first two Grammy Award nominations for Best New Artist and Best Contemporary R&B Album.

== Background and recording ==
At age 13, Brown was discovered in Virginia by Hitmission Records, a local production team that visited the gas station where his father worked, while searching for new talent. Hitmission helped to arrange a demo package, under the name of "C. Sizzle", and approached contacts in New York.

Tina Davis, senior A&R executive at Def Jam Recordings, heard the demo package that Brown's local team had sent to Def Jam, and among the artists contained in the CD she was impressed by Brown with his track "Whose Girl Is That". Davis later had Brown auditioning in her New York office, and she immediately took him to meet the former president of the Island Def Jam Music Group, Antonio "L.A." Reid, who offered to sign him that day, but Brown refused his proposal because Reid wouldn't talk to his mother. Brown then moved temporarily to Harlem, New York to seek a record deal. The negotiations with Def Jam continued for two months, and ended when Davis lost her job due to a corporate merger. Brown asked her to be his manager, and once Davis accepted, she promoted the singer to other labels such as Jive Records, J-Records and Warner Bros. Records. "I knew that Chris had real talent," says Davis. "I just knew I wanted to be part of it."

According to Mark Pitts, in an interview with HitQuarters, Davis presented Brown with a video recording, and Pitts' reaction was: "I saw huge potential ... I didn't love all the records, but I loved his voice. It wasn't a problem because I knew that he could sing, and I knew how to make records." Brown ultimately signed with Jive Records on Christmas Eve of 2004. Brown stated, "I picked Jive because they had the best success with younger artists in the pop market, [...] I knew I was going to capture my African American audience, but Jive had a lot of strength in the pop area as well as longevity in careers." At the time, he dropped out of tenth grade at his Essex High School in Virginia, in favor of tutoring.

Brown developed the concept for the album along with Mark Pitts and Tina Davis, and began recording it in Miami, Florida. The singer worked with several producers and songwriters—Scott Storch, Cool & Dre, Sean Garrett and Jazze Pha among them—commenting that they "really believed in [him]". In 2023, Brown described working on his first album as a "learning experience". The singer worked on 50 songs before coming to a final 14 tracks to be included on his first album. Brown co-wrote half of the tracks. "I write about the things that 16 year olds go through every day," says Brown. "Like you just got in trouble for sneaking your girl into the house, or you can't drive, so you steal a car or something." The whole album took less than eight weeks to produce. Brown initially intended to both rap and sing on the album, but Pitts encouraged him to focus exclusively on singing. Pitts explained: "I was trying to keep it at, ‘You’re a singer’ I was caught up in the idea of ‘Stay in your lane’". The album was initially supposed to be titled Young Love, however, that idea for the album title has been discarded as being "too kiddie".

== Promotion ==
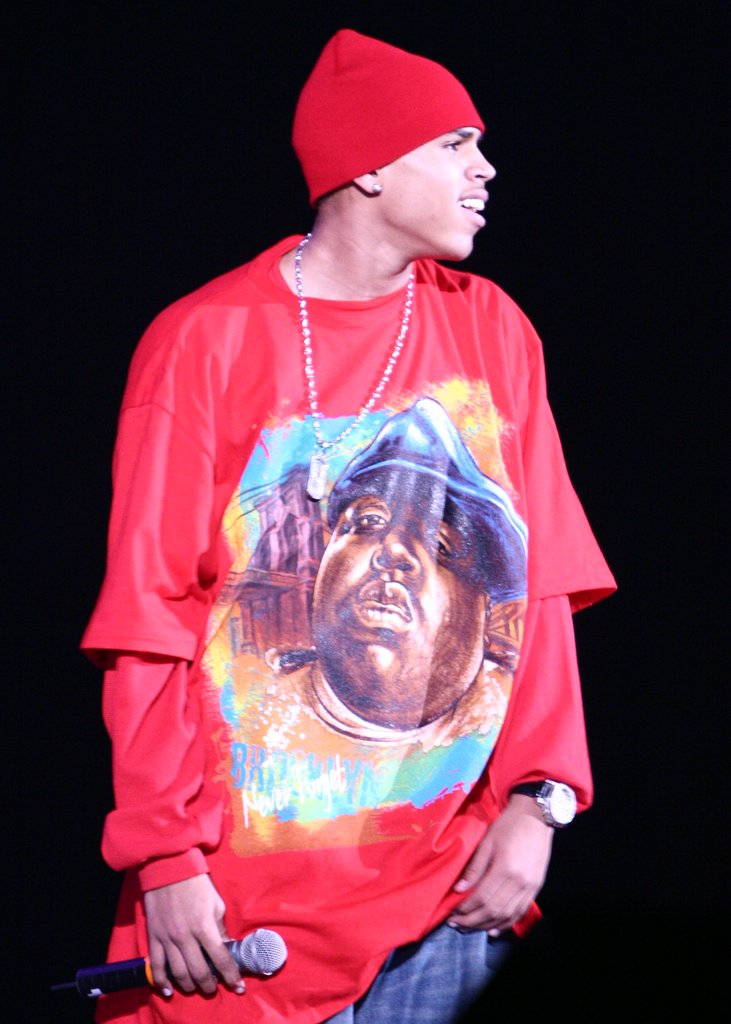
Brown performing in Seattle in December 2005

Through the winter, Brown joined the Scream V Encore Tour, featuring Ciara, Bow Wow, Omarion and Marques Houston, as a supporting act. Later, he headlined the Xbox 360 Presents: Chris Brown Tour, supported by T-Pain.

On June 13, 2006, Brown released a DVD entitled Chris Brown's Journey, which shows footage of him traveling in England and Japan, getting ready for his first visit to the Grammy Awards, behind the scenes of his music videos and bloopers. On August 17, 2006, to further promote the album, Brown began his major co-headlining tour, The Up Close and Personal Tour.

== Music ==
Chris Brown is an R&B album, characterized by a hip hop soul sound. The album features Brown performing with a "sweet, soaring tenor" over productions that include both hip-hop influenced "gangsta-style rough beats" and traditional R&B instrumentals. According to Vibe, it features "a well-balanced mix of high-energy cuts and young-love ditties". Lyrically, it primarily explores teenage love, mixing themes of first approaches to love involvement, infatuation, physical attraction and coolness. The album also has few episodes where the singer mentions sex with older women, explains his growing up, and talks about his relationship with his mother.

== Singles ==
Brown's official debut single from Chris Brown, "Run It!" was released on June 30, 2005, in the United States. The song features guest vocals from an American rapper Juelz Santana, while the production that was handled by Scott Storch. It reached number one in Australia, New Zealand and on the US Billboard Hot 100, where it stayed for over five weeks, and also achieved continuous airplays, also topping on the airplays for the Billboard Hot 100. The song also topped Billboard's Pop 100 chart and entered the top forty on the majority of the chart that it appeared on, further reaching top ten in several countries, including Finland, Hungary, Ireland, Germany, the Netherlands, Scotland, Switzerland and the United Kingdom.

The album's second single, "Yo (Excuse Me Miss)" discusses the first conversation someone has with a girl. Produced by duo Dre & Vidal, it was released on December 13, 2005. The song charted in the top ten on the US Hot 100 in the US, peaking at number seven, and became a top ten hit in Australia, the Netherlands, and New Zealand. "Yo (Excuse Me Miss)" was followed by "Gimme That." A remix featuring guest vocals from a fellow American rapper Lil Wayne was released as the album's third single on May 7, 2006, and peaked at number 15 on the Billboard Hot 100 chart. Fourth single "Say Goodbye" was released on August 8, 2006. Produced by Bryan-Michael Cox, it became another top ten hit for Brown in the US. The album's fifth and final single, "Poppin'" was released on November 21, 2006, and became a top five hit on Billboard's Hot R&B/Hip-Hop Songs chart.

== Critical reception ==
Professional ratings
Review scores
Source	Rating
AllMusic	3/5 stars
Blender	3/5 stars
Entertainment Weekly	C+
Evening Standard	3/5 stars
The Guardian	3/5 stars
Rolling Stone	2.5/5 stars
Vibe	4/5 stars

Andy Kellman of AllMusic said that the album "almost always involves an even push-and-pull between what appeals to kids who don't consider street credibility and those who do," praising Brown's introduction in R&B music as "a refreshing presence, a high-schooler who's neither as family friendly as Will Smith nor as comically vulgar as Pretty Ricky." Chris Elwell-Sutton from The Evening Standard found that "Brown's sweet, soaring tenor – like Usher's, but with more vigour – carries" tracks such as "Run It!". There are other hip-hop-tinged points, such as "Gimme," on which the cheeky scamp attempts to seduce an older woman. The album has just enough raunch to please kids and not upset parents." Michael Endelman of Entertainment Weekly gave the album a short, mixed review, saying that the album is "perfect for the homecoming dance, but you’ll need a chaperone."

Christian Hoard, writing for Rolling Stone, felt that Chris Brown was "innocuous enough for the Teen People set, which is part of the problem. Brown's voice suggests both Usher and a young Jacko, but his charms are often lost in the album's plush, listless production and undercooked songs." Caroline Sullivan from The Guardian described the album as "promising stuff" but noted "a deft purveyor of mid-tempo, hip-hop-inspired pop whose lyrics never stray into naughty post-watershed territory. Love of the puppy variety is Brown's area of expertise, but there's a sweetness to his voice that keeps the likes of "Young Love" from being too sickening." Sullivan's colleague, Decca Aitkenhead, later defined Chris Brown as "a smooth slice of commercial R&B." In 2015, Vibe praised the album for showcasing the singer's "intriguingly robust level of talent," noting how the album made him being "quickly stamped as the future of R&B." In a further retrospective review, Mya Singleton from Yardbarker listed the album among "the best R&B albums of the 2000s," stating that the singer with the self-titled album "helped usher in a newer generation of R&B artists".

=== Awards and nominations ===
Awards and nominations for Chris Brown
Year	Ceremony	Category	Result	Ref.
2007	Grammy Awards	Best Contemporary R&B Album	Nominated	
2007	Soul Train Music Awards	Best R&B/Soul Album	Nominated	

== Commercial performance ==
Chris Brown debuted at number two on the US Billboard 200 chart, selling 154,000 copies in its first week. This became Brown's first US top-ten debut. The album also debuted at number one on the US Top R&B/Hip-Hop Albums chart, becoming his first number one on that chart. On December 1, 2025, the album was a certified quadraple platinum by the Recording Industry Association of America (RIAA) for sales of over four million copies. By April 2011, the album had sold 2.1 million copies in the United States alone and over three million copies worldwide.

== Track listing ==
Chris Brown track listing
No.	Title	Writer(s)	Producer(s)	Length
1.	"Intro"	Christopher Brown; Edmund Clement	Eddie Hustle	0:57
2.	"Run It!" (featuring Juelz Santana)	Scott Storch; Sean Garrett; LaRon James	Storch; Garrett^{[a]}	3:50
3.	"Yo (Excuse Me Miss)"	Johntá Austin; Vidal Davis; Andre Harris	Dre & Vidal	3:49
4.	"Young Love"	Harvey Mason, Jr.; Damon Thomas; Antonio Dixon; Keri Hilson; Patrick "J. Que" Smith	The Underdogs; Dixon	3:38
5.	"Gimme That"	Storch; Garrett	Storch; Garrett^{[a]}	3:07
6.	"Ya Man Ain't Me"	Mason Jr.; Thomas; Dixon; Eric Dawkins; Steve Russell; Durrell "Tank" Babbs	The Underdogs; Dixon^{[a]}	3:34
7.	"Winner"	Brown; Bryan-Michael Cox; Kendrick "WyldCard" Dean; Adonis Shropshire	Cox; Dean^{[a]}	4:04
8.	"Ain't No Way (You Won't Love Me)"	Warren "Oak" Felder; Garrett; Zhang Fuquan	Garrett; Felder^{[a]}	3:23
9.	"What's My Name" (featuring Noah)	Brown; Christopher Lyon; Marcello Valenzano	Cool & Dre	3:52
10.	"Is This Love?"	Mason Jr.; Thomas; Mason; Dawkins; Russell	The Underdogs	3:17
11.	"Poppin'"	Austin; Davis; Harris	Dre & Vidal	4:25
12.	"Just Fine"	Brown; Lance Bennett; Shannon Lawrence; Mike Winans	Lawrence; Winans; Bennett	3:52
13.	"Say Goodbye"	Cox; Jevon; Shropshire	Cox	4:50
14.	"Run It!" (Remix) (featuring Bow Wow and Jermaine Dupri)	Storch; Garrett; Jermaine Dupri	Storch; Garrett^{[a]}; Dupri^{[b]}; LRoc^{[b]}	4:04
15.	"Thank You"	Brown; Shea Taylor; Lamont "LA" Fleming; Tina Davis	Taylor	4:27

Bonus track
No.	Title	Writer(s)	Producer(s)	Length
16.	"Gimme That" (Remix) (featuring Lil Wayne)	Storch; Garrett; Dwayne Carter, Jr.	Storch; Garrett^{[a]}	3:57
Total length:				59:01

Expanded edition
No.	Title	Writer(s)	Producer(s)	Length
15.	"So Glad"	Berry Gordy; Carvin Haggins; Dennis Lussier; Alphonso Mizell; Freddie Perren; Ivan Barias; Shaffer Smith	Carvin & Ivan	2:57
16.	"Seen the Light" (featuring Rico Love)	Love; Charly Charles; Craig Stevens; Shonn Bennett; Bunny Sigler; Kenneth Gamble; Leon Huff	Craig Groove; Moox; Shuga Bear	4:09
17.	"Thank You"	Brown; Taylor; Fleming; Davis	Taylor	4:27
Total length:				60:02

Notes

- ^{^[a]} signifies co-producer(s)
- ^{^[b]} signifies additional producer(s)

Sample credits

- "Run It!" contains a portion of the composition "I Know What Boys Like" as written by Chris Butler.
- "Young Love" contains a sample from "Sideshow" as written by Bobby Eli and Vinnie Barrett and performed by Blue Magic.
- "Ain't No Way (You Won't Love Me)" contains a portion of the composition of "Song of the Dragon & Phoenix" as written by Zhang Fuquan.
- "Run It! (Remix)" contains a sample from "Jam Master Jay" as performed by Run DMC.
- "So Glad" contains a sample from "It's Great To Be Here" as performed by The Jackson 5.
- "Seen the Light" contains a sample from "I See the Light" as performed by Billy Paul.

== Personnel ==
- Executive producers: Chris Brown, Tina Davis, Mark Pitts
- Art direction: Courtney Walter
- A&R: Leticia Hilliard, Matt Schwartz
- Assistant recording engineers: Val Brathwrite (track 7), Vadim Chislov (2, 5, 16), Anthony G. Crisano (1, 5, 9, 12, 15–16), Patrick Magee (2, 5, 16), Lucas McLendon (1), Tadd Mingo (14), Aaron Renner (4, 6, 10)
- Bass: David Cabrerra (track 9)
- Design: Courtney Walter
- Recording engineers: Wayne Allison (tracks 2, 5, 16), Vincent Dilorenzo (3, 11), Conrad Golding (2, 5, 16), Dabling "Hobby Boy" Harward (4, 6, 10), John Horesco IV (14), Eddie Hustle (music 1), Charles McCrorey (2, 5, 9, 16), Oak Felder (8), Carlos Paucar (5, 16), Keith Sengbusch (9, 12), Kelly Sheehan (4, 6, 10), Shea Taylor (15), Alonzo Vargas (12), Sam Thomas (7, 13)
- Guitar: Val Brathwrite, Aaron Fishbein (tracks 2, 5, 16), David Cabrerra (9)
- Keyboards: Kendrick Dean (tracks 7, 13), Shea Taylor (15)
- Mastering: Herb Powers
- Mixing: Kevin "KD" Davis (track 8), Vincent Dilorenzo (3, 11), Jermaine Dupri (14), Jean-Marie Horvat (7, 13), Eddie Hustle (1), Rich Keller (12), Phil Tan (14), The Underdogs (4, 6, 10), Stephen "Stevo" George (15), Brian Stanley (2, 5, 9, 16)
- Mixing assistant: Val Brathwaite (tracks 2, 5, 16), Steve Tolle (9), Mike Tschupp (2)
- Multi instruments: Bryan-Michael Cox (tracks 7, 13), Vidal Davis (3, 11), Andre Harris (3, 11), Shea Taylor (drum machine 15)
- Photography: Clay Patrick McBride
- Remix producer: Jermaine Dupri (track 14), L-Rock (14)
- Background vocals: Steve Russell (track 10)
- Vocal producer: Lamont "LA" Flemming (track 15), Shannon "Slam" Lawrence (12)
- Vocal recording: Charles McCrorey (tracks 1, 15), Stephen "Stevo" George (additional 15)
- Vocal tracking: Ian Crosse (track 8)

== Charts ==
=== Weekly charts ===
Weekly chart performance for Chris Brown
Chart (2005–2006)	Peak position
Australian Albums (ARIA)	57
Australian Urban Albums (ARIA)	10
Austrian Albums (Ö3 Austria)	66
Belgian Albums (Ultratop Flanders)	47
Canadian Albums (Nielsen SoundScan)	39
Dutch Albums (Album Top 100)	47
European Top 100 Albums (Billboard)	42
French Albums (SNEP)	51
German Albums (Offizielle Top 100)	31
Irish Albums (IRMA)	71
Japanese Albums (Oricon)	29
New Zealand Albums (RMNZ)	8
Scottish Albums (Official Charts)	71
Swiss Albums (Schweizer Hitparade)	18
UK Albums (Official Charts)	29
UK R&B Albums (Official Charts)	4
US Billboard 200	2
US Top R&B/Hip-Hop Albums (Billboard)	1
US R&B/Hip-Hop Catalog Albums (Billboard)	4

=== Year-end charts ===
2006 year-end chart performance for Chris Brown
Chart (2006)	Position
Australian Urban Albums (ARIA)	26
UK Albums (OCC)	200
US Billboard 200	17
US Top R&B/Hip-Hop Albums (Billboard)	5

2007 year-end chart performance for Chris Brown
Chart (2007)	Position
US Billboard 200	199
US Top R&B/Hip-Hop Albums (Billboard)	62

== Certifications ==
Certifications for Chris Brown
Region	Certification	Certified units/sales
Australia (ARIA)	Platinum	70,000^{‡}
Canada (Music Canada)	Gold	50,000^{^}
Denmark (IFPI Danmark)	Gold	10,000^{‡}
New Zealand (RMNZ)	3× Platinum	45,000^{‡}
South Africa (RISA)	Gold	25,000^{‡}
United Kingdom (BPI)	Gold	100,000^{^}
United States (RIAA)	4× Platinum	4,000,000^{‡}
^{^} Shipments figures based on certification alone.^{‡} Sales+streaming figures based on certification alone.
