= Say Goodbye (Chris Brown song) =

Single by Chris Brown

from the album Chris Brown
- Released: August 8, 2006
- Length: 4:49
- Label: Jive
- Songwriters: Bryan-Michael Cox; Kendrick "WyldCard" Dean; Adonis Shropshire
- Producer: Bryan-Michael Cox

Chris Brown singles chronology
"Gimme That" (2006)	"Say Goodbye" (2006)	"Shortie Like Mine" (2006)

Music video
- "Say Goodbye" on YouTube

"Say Goodbye" is a song recorded by American singer Chris Brown. It was released by Adonis Shropshire along with Bryan-Michael Cox and Kendrick "WyldCard" Dean for Brown's self-titled debut album (2005). Released as the album's fourth single on August 8, 2006, it became Brown's third top-ten single on the US Billboard Hot 100, peaking at number ten on October 31, 2006, and the second single of his career to top the R&B charts. "Say Goodbye" was also featured in the movie Step Up (2006).

== Composition ==
The song is written in the key of B♭ minor in common time with a tempo of 115 beats per minute. Brown's vocals span from D♭_{4} to C♭_{6} in the song.

== Critical reception ==
While reviewing soundtrack of Step Up, Heather Phares of AllMusic called this song "wistful" and noted that it gets the film's romantic angle across without interrupting the flow of the more danceable tracks.

== Chart performance ==
It became Brown's third top-ten single on the Billboard Hot 100, peaking at number ten on October 31, 2006, and the second single of his career to top the R&B charts. The track was released as a single in the UK and US. It was his first single to not chart at all in the UK.

== Music video ==
A music video for "Say Goodbye," directed by Jessy Terrero, was released July 26, 2006. It features a short clip of the track "Ain't No Way (You Won't Love Me)" at the beginning of the music video. It follows Brown trying to end his relationship with his girlfriend but at the same time, cannot find a way to explain himself to her. While doing dance rehearsals, his new love interest appears and this causes friction between Brown and his girlfriend. The current girlfriend begins to cry as she catches Brown and his new love interest almost kiss. When the dance performance begins, Brown’s girlfriend and new love interest almost get involved in a physical altercation but Brown appears just in time to stop them. When Brown’s girlfriend tries to stay by his side, he pushes her away. Once Brown does this, we then see Brown finally dumping his girlfriend for the new love interest. She then walks offstage, clearly disappointed and heartbroken over seeing Brown choose his new woman over her.

== Charts ==
=== Weekly charts ===
Weekly chart performance for "Say Goodbye"
Chart (2006)	Peak position
US Billboard Hot 100	10
US Adult R&B Songs (Billboard)	39
US Hot R&B/Hip-Hop Songs (Billboard)	1
US Latin Rhythm Airplay (Billboard)	39
US Pop Airplay (Billboard)	14
US Rhythmic Airplay (Billboard)	2

=== Year-end charts ===
2006 year-end chart performance for "Say Goodbye"
Chart (2006)	Position
US Billboard Hot 100	86
US Hot R&B/Hip-Hop Songs (Billboard)	34
US Rhythmic (Billboard)	38

2007 year-end chart performance for "Say Goodbye"
Chart (2007)	Position
Brazil (Crowley)	56
Romania (Romanian Top 100)	69

== Certifications ==
Certifications for "Say Goodbye"
Region	Certification	Certified units/sales
Brazil (Pro-Música Brasil)	Platinum	60,000^{*}
New Zealand (RMNZ)	Platinum	30,000^{‡}
United Kingdom (BPI)	Silver	200,000^{‡}
United States (RIAA)	3× Platinum	3,000,000^{‡}
United States (RIAA) (Mastertone)	Platinum	1,000,000^{^}
^{*} Sales figures based on certification alone.^{^} Shipments figures based on certification alone.^{‡} Sales+streaming figures based on certification alone.
