= Poppin' (Chris Brown song) =

Single by Chris Brown

from the album Chris Brown
- Released: November 21, 2006
- Length: 4:25
- Label: CBE; Jive
- Songwriters: Andre Harris; Vidal Davis; Johntá Austin
- Producer: Dre & Vidal

Chris Brown singles chronology
"Shortie Like Mine" (2006)	"Poppin'" (2006)	"Wall to Wall" (2007)

Audio video
- "Poppin'" on YouTube

"Poppin'" is a song by American singer Chris Brown. It was written by Johntá Austin along with Andre Harris and Vidal Davis from production duo Dre & Vidal for his self-titled debut album (2005). Released by Jive Records as the album's fifth single in November 2006, it peaked at number 42 on the US Billboard Hot 100 and number five on the Hot R&B/Hip-Hop Songs chart.

== Background ==
"Poppin'" was written by Johntá Austin along with Andre Harris and Vidal Davis from production duo Dre & Vidal. In the song, Brown sings about meeting a girl and claims that her looks "set him on fire." He is basically giving praise to the young lady's physical attributes and therefore describing her as "poppin'".

== Chart performance ==
Issued as the fifth single from the Chris Brown album, "Poppin'" debuted at number 82 on the US Billboard Hot 100 chart on December 5, 2006. The song eventually peaked at number 42 on February 6, 2007 and spent a total of 20 weeks on the chart, though it was not promoted physically as a CD single. It became the first Chris Brown single to miss the top fifteen. The single was certified platinum by the Recording Industry Association of America (RIAA) for sales of over 1,000,000 copies in the United States.

== Remix ==
The official remix of "Poppin'" features rappers Lil Wayne and Juelz Santana. Both artists are featured on separate tracks on Chris Brown's self-titled debut album as well.

== Charts ==
=== Weekly charts ===
Weekly chart performance for "Poppin'"
Chart (2007)	Peak position
US Billboard Hot 100	42
US Hot R&B/Hip-Hop Songs (Billboard)	5
US Rhythmic Airplay (Billboard)	20

=== Year-end charts ===
Year-end chart performance for "Poppin'"
Chart (2007)	Position
US Hot R&B/Hip-Hop Songs (Billboard)	10

== Certifications ==
Certifications for "Poppin'"
Region	Certification	Certified units/sales
Brazil (Pro-Música Brasil)	Platinum	60,000^{*}
New Zealand (RMNZ)	Platinum	30,000^{‡}
United States (RIAA)	Platinum	1,000,000^{‡}
United States (RIAA) (Mastertone)	Gold	500,000^{^}
^{*} Sales figures based on certification alone.^{^} Shipments figures based on certification alone.^{‡} Sales+streaming figures based on certification alone.
