= Yo (Excuse Me Miss) =

Single by Chris Brown

from the album Chris Brown
- Released: November 29, 2005
- Genre: R&B
- Length: 3:49
- Label: Jive
- Songwriters: Johntá Austin; Vidal Davis; Andre Harris
- Producers: Dre & Vidal

Chris Brown singles chronology
"Run It!" (2005)	"Yo (Excuse Me Miss)" (2005)	"Gimme That" (2006)

Music video
- "Yo (Excuse Me Miss)" on YouTube

"Yo (Excuse Me Miss)" is a song by American singer Chris Brown. It was written by Johntá Austin along with Andre Harris and Vidal Davis from production duo Dre & Vidal for Brown's self-titled debut album (2005), while production was helmed by Harris and Davis. Lyrically, the R&B track focuses on teenage love. "Yo (Excuse Me Miss)" features background vocals from singer André Meritt in the chorus.

The song was released by Jive Records as the album's second single in November 2005 in the United States, and February 2006 worldwide. It became Brown's second top ten single in the United States, peaking at number seven on the US Billboard Hot 100, causing the song to appear on the 2006 compilation album Now That’s What I Call Music! 22. "Yo (Excuse Me Miss)" also became a top ten hit in Australia, the Netherlands, and New Zealand. At the 2006 BET Awards, the song won in the Viewer's Choice category, while its music video, directed by Erik White and Brown, received Best R&B Video nominations at both the 2006 MTV Video Music Awards and the MTV Australia Awards.

== Critical reception ==
In her review of parent album Chris Brown, Kelefa Sanneh from The New York Times wrote: "[Brown] sounds enthusiastic but polite, more the solicitous friend than the lecherous stranger [...] The beat, by Andre Harris and Vidal Davis, evokes the plush minimalism of an expensive sofa, and once again Mr. Brown makes an ostentatiously well-mannered plea." Rolling Stone listed "Yo (Excuse Me Miss)" among the 30 best R&B songs of the 21st century. HotNewHipHop stated in 2021 that "the song and accompanying music video have become somewhat of a cultural phenomenon since its release nearly two decades ago. In the visual, Brown memorably pursues a girl while dancing for her and singing the lyrics to her, a true testament and time stamp of the 00s era."

== Chart performance ==
According to Billboard, "Yo (Excuse Me Miss)" was the song that solidified Brown's presence in the music industry, following the success of his previous single "Run It!". The song peaked at number seven on the US Billboard Hot 100 on February 18, 2006, becoming Brown's second top-ten song on the chart. It spent a total of 21 weeks on the chart. On December 12, 2007, "Yo (Excuse Me Miss)" was certified platinum by the Recording Industry Association of America (RIAA) for sales of over a million copies in the United States. Elsewhere, the song became a top ten hit in Australia, the Netherlands, and New Zealand and reached number thirteen on the UK Singles Chart.

== Music video ==
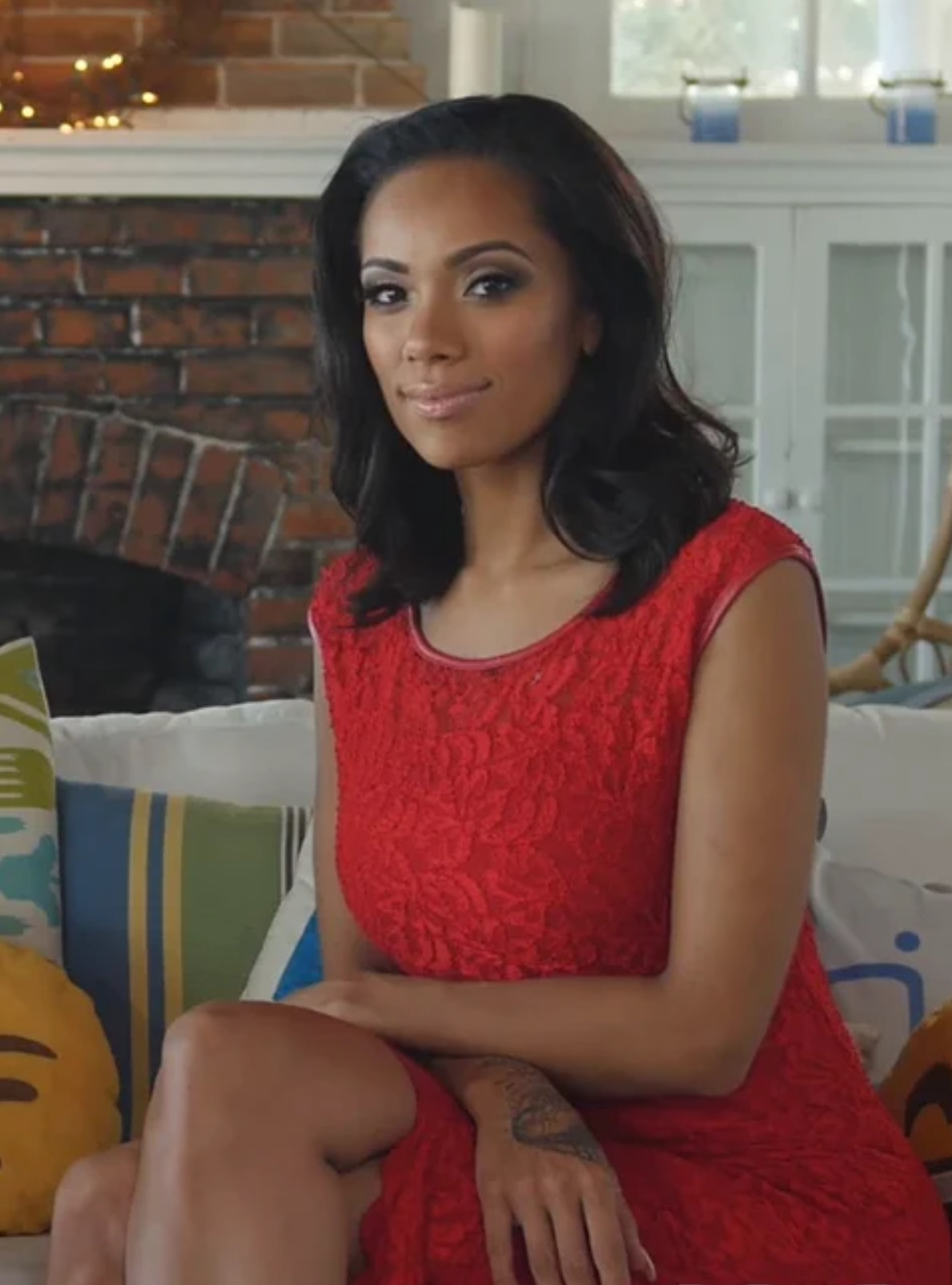
Erica Mena co-starred as Brown's love interest in the video for "Yo (Excuse Me Miss)."

The song's music video was directed by Erik White and Chris Brown. Filmed in various locations throughout Los Angeles, including a basketball court in Pecan Park, it features then-model Erica Mena as a girl Brown sees, catching his attention. He then follows the girl while dancing for her. After arriving at a basketball court, he continues the choreography with two other guys. Brown then gets the girl's car and sings to her. They get close, then she gives him her phone to put his number in. The video's ending transitions to the first verse of "Gimme That", with Brown singing in a different scenario.

Lil' JJ, Trey Songz, and DeRay Davis make cameo appearances in the video. Portions of the visuals were inspired by singer Michael Jackson's 1987 video for his single "The Way You Make Me Feel." "Yo (Excuse Me Miss)" received a Best R&B Video nomination at the 2006 MTV Video Music Awards, but lost to Beyoncé's "Check on It" (2005).

== Live performance ==
On April 1, 2006, Brown performed "Yo (Excuse Me Miss)" at the 2006 Kids' Choice Awards as part of a musical duel with rapper Bow Wow that was inspired by the 1986 Run-D.M.C. music video "Walk This Way".

== Track listing ==
CD / Digital single
No.	Title	Writer(s)	Producer(s)	Length
1.	"Yo (Excuse Me Miss)"	Johntá Austin; Vidal Davis; Andre Harris	Dre & Vidal	3:50
2.	"Yo (Excuse Me Miss)"	Austin; Davis; Harris	Dre & Vidal	3:49

European maxi-single
No.	Title	Writer(s)	Producer(s)	Length
1.	"Yo (Excuse Me Miss)" (Johnny Douglas Remix)	Austin; Davis; Harris	Dre & Vidal; Johnny Douglas^{[a]}	3:41
2.	"Yo (Excuse Me Miss)" (Main version)	Austin; Davis; Harris	Dre & Vidal	3:49

Notes

- ^{^[a]} signifies co-producer(s)

== Credits and personnel ==
Credits adapted from Chris Brown liner notes.

- Johnta Austin – writer
- Chris Brown – vocalist
- Vidal Davis – all instruments, producer, writer
- Vincent DiLorenzo – mixing and recording engineer
- Andre Harris – all instruments, producer, writer
- Herb Powers Jr. – mastering engineer

== Charts ==
=== Weekly charts ===
Weekly chart performance for "Yo (Excuse Me Miss)"
Chart (2005–06)	Peak Position
Australia (ARIA)	10
Australian Urban (ARIA)	4
Belgium (Ultratip Bubbling Under Flanders)	6
Belgium (Ultratip Bubbling Under Wallonia)	6
Canada CHR/Pop Top 30 (Radio & Records)	18
European Hot 100 Singles (Billboard)	43
Finland (Suomen virallinen lista)	14
Germany (GfK)	56
Ireland (IRMA)	15
Netherlands (Dutch Top 40 Tipparade)	6
Netherlands (Single Top 100)	67
New Zealand (Recorded Music NZ)	9
Scotland Singles (OCC)	24
Switzerland (Schweizer Hitparade)	34
UK Singles (OCC)	13
UK Hip Hop/R&B (OCC)	5
US Billboard Hot 100	7
US Adult R&B Songs (Billboard)	25
US Hot R&B/Hip-Hop Songs (Billboard)	2
US Pop Airplay (Billboard)	13
US Rhythmic Airplay (Billboard)	2

=== Year-end charts ===
Year-end chart performance for "Yo (Excuse Me Miss)"
Chart (2006)	Position
Australia (ARIA)	93
UK Singles (OCC)	162
UK Urban (Music Week)	3
US Billboard Hot 100	44
US Hot R&B/Hip-Hop Songs (Billboard)	9
US Rhythmic (Billboard)	18

== Certifications ==
Certifications for "Yo (Excuse Me Miss)"
Region	Certification	Certified units/sales
Australia (ARIA)	Platinum	70,000^{‡}
Brazil (Pro-Música Brasil)	Platinum	60,000^{*}
New Zealand (RMNZ)	4× Platinum	120,000^{‡}
United Kingdom (BPI)	Platinum	600,000^{‡}
United States (RIAA)	4× Platinum	4,000,000^{‡}
United States (RIAA) (Mastertone)	Platinum	1,000,000^{^}
^{*} Sales figures based on certification alone.^{^} Shipments figures based on certification alone.^{‡} Sales+streaming figures based on certification alone.
