= Chris Brown =

American singer, songwriter, dancer, and actor (born 1989)

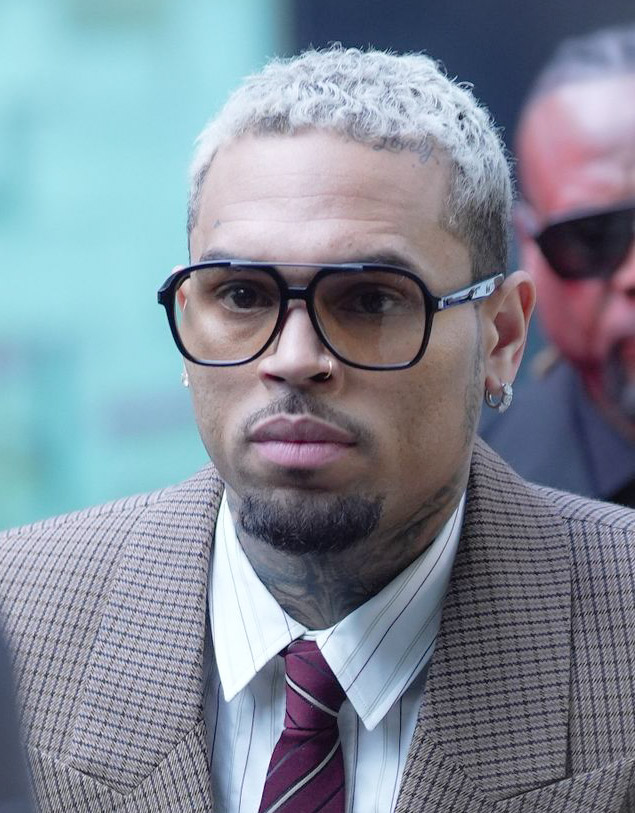
- Brown in 2025
- Born: Christopher Maurice Brown; May 5, 1989 (age 37); Tappahannock, Virginia, U.S.
- Other names: C. Sizzle; Breezy; CB
- Occupations: Singer; songwriter; rapper; dancer; actor
- Years active: 2002–present
- Works: Discography; production; videography
- Children: 4
- Awards: Full list
- Musical career
- Genres: R&B; pop; hip-hop
- Instrument: Vocals
- Labels: CBE; Jive; RCA
- Website: chrisbrownworld.com

Christopher Maurice Brown (born May 5, 1989) is an American singer, songwriter, dancer, and actor. An R&B musician who works in a variety of genres, he has been called the "King of R&B" by some contemporaries. His lyrics often address emotional and hedonistic themes.

In 2004, Brown signed with Jive Records. The following year, he released his first album, Chris Brown, which reached double Platinum certification by the end of 2006. Brown topped the Billboard Hot 100 chart with his debut single, "Run It!", making him the first male artist since 1995 to do so. His second album, Exclusive (2007), was commercially successful worldwide and spawned his second Billboard Hot 100 number-one single, "Kiss Kiss".

In 2009, Brown pleaded guilty to felony assault of his girlfriend, the singer Rihanna. He was sentenced to five years probation with six months community service. The same year, he released his third album, Graffiti, which underperformed commercially. He released his fourth album F.A.M.E. (2011), which was his first album to top the Billboard 200. The album contained the commercially successful singles "Yeah 3x", Diamond certified "Look at Me Now" and "Beautiful People", and earned him the Grammy Award for Best R&B Album. His fifth album, Fortune, released in 2012, also topped the Billboard 200.

Following the releases of X (2014) and Royalty (2015), both peaking in the Top 3 of the Billboard 200, his eighth album, Heartbreak on a Full Moon (2017), a double-disc LP consisting of 45 tracks, was certified Gold for combined sales and album-equivalent units of over 500,000 after one week, and later certified double Platinum. Brown's ninth album, Indigo (2019) found similar success, debuting atop the Billboard 200. It included the single "No Guidance" which broke the record for longest-running number one on Billboard's R&B/Hip-Hop Airplay chart. Its chart success was outdone with the single "Go Crazy" released the following year, which broke Brown's own record for longest-running number one. In 2022, his Indigo album spawned a sleeper hit with its song "Under the Influence", which was re-released as a single. In the 2020s, Brown released top-10 debuts Breezy in 2022, Grammy-winning 11:11 in 2023, and Brown in 2026.

Brown has sold over 140 million records worldwide, making him one of the world's best-selling music artists. He has gained a cult following, and is one of the highest-grossing African American touring artists of all time. His singing and dancing skills have often been compared favorably to those of Michael Jackson. In 2019, Billboard named Brown the third most successful artist of the 2010s decade in R&B and hip-hop music, behind Drake and Rihanna. Brown has won 224 awards from 578 nominations over the course of his career. He has also pursued an acting career. In 2007, he made his feature film debut in Stomp the Yard, and appeared as a guest on the television series The O.C. Other films include This Christmas (2007), Takers (2010), Think Like a Man (2012) and Battle of the Year (2013).

== Early life, family and education ==
Christopher Maurice Brown was born on May 5, 1989, in Tappahannock, Virginia, to Joyce Hawkins, a former day care center director, and Clinton Brown, a corrections officer at a local prison. He has an older sister, Lytrell Bundy, a bank employee. Music has been present in Brown's life since his childhood. He listened to soul albums his parents owned, and eventually began to show interest in hip-hop.

His parents had divorced when he was 6 years old, and his mother's boyfriend, Donnelle Hawkins, (Note: According to at least one source, Brown called Donnelle Hawkins his stepdad, and both Donnelle and Brown's mother share that surname, indicated they were married.) terrified him by subjecting her to domestic violence. In a 2017 self-documentary film, Welcome to My Life, Brown recalls the couple's abusive relationship. Brown said that when he was six, his mother's partner shot himself in the head, but did not die. The gunshot blinded him, the physical impairment only adding to his rage. Donnelle vented his anger and frustration on Brown's mother. "I had to hear my mom get beat up every night. I'd pee on myself, just scared to even walk out into the hallway, because I didn't want to see nothing".

Brown taught himself to sing and dance at a young age and often cites Michael Jackson as his inspiration. He began to perform in his church choir and in several local talent shows. Brown said, during a 2023 interview, that he began considering a music career after winning a talent show during a summer camp when he was 11 years old, performing Sisqó's "Thong Song": "The camp leaders, they laughed, but everybody kinda went crazy in there and I was like 'I think I can do this'." When he mimicked an Usher performance of "My Way", his mother recognized his vocal talent, and they began to look for the opportunity of a record deal.

At age 16, Brown dropped out of Essex High School in Virginia in late 2004 or early 2005 to relocate and pursue a music career.

== Career ==
=== 2002–2004: Career beginnings ===
At age 13, Brown was discovered by Hitmission Records, a local production team that visited the gas station where his father worked, while searching for new talent. Around the same time, he performed with one of his production manager's sons, named TJ, for hip-hop artist Puff Daddy, but the rapper refused to sign him to his record label Bad Boy Records. Hitmission's Lamont Fleming provided voice coaching for Brown. The team helped to arrange a demo package, under the name of "C. Sizzle", and approached contacts in New York. Tina Davis, senior A&R executive at Def Jam Recordings, heard the demo package that Brown's local team had sent to Def Jam, and among the various artists on the CD, she was impressed by Brown’s track "Whose Girl Is That". Davis later had Brown auditioning in her New York office, and she immediately took him to meet the then president of Island Def Jam Music Group, Antonio "L.A." Reid, who offered to sign him that day, but Brown refused his proposal because Reid wouldn't talk to his mother. Brown then moved temporarily to Harlem, New York City, to seek a record deal. The negotiations with Def Jam continued for two months, and ended when Davis lost her job due to a corporate merger. Brown asked her to be his manager, and once Davis accepted, she promoted the singer to other labels such as Jive Records, J-Records and Warner Bros. Records. "I knew that Chris had real talent," says Davis. "I just knew I wanted to be part of it."

According to Mark Pitts, in an interview with HitQuarters, Davis presented Brown with a video recording, and Pitts' reaction was: "I saw huge potential ... I didn't love all the records, but I loved his voice. It wasn't a problem because I knew that he could sing, and I knew how to make records." Brown ultimately chose Jive due to its successful work with then-young acts such as Britney Spears and Justin Timberlake. Brown stated, "I picked Jive because they had the best success with younger artists in the pop market, [...] I knew I was going to capture my African American audience, but Jive had a lot of strength in the pop area as well as longevity in careers." In a 2014 interview, Brown said that during his time in Harlem, his artistic intention was to both rap and sing on his records. However, Jive convinced him to focus solely on singing, because at the time, "it wasn't acceptable yet" for an R&B singer to also rap on records.

=== 2005–2006: Chris Brown and acting debut ===
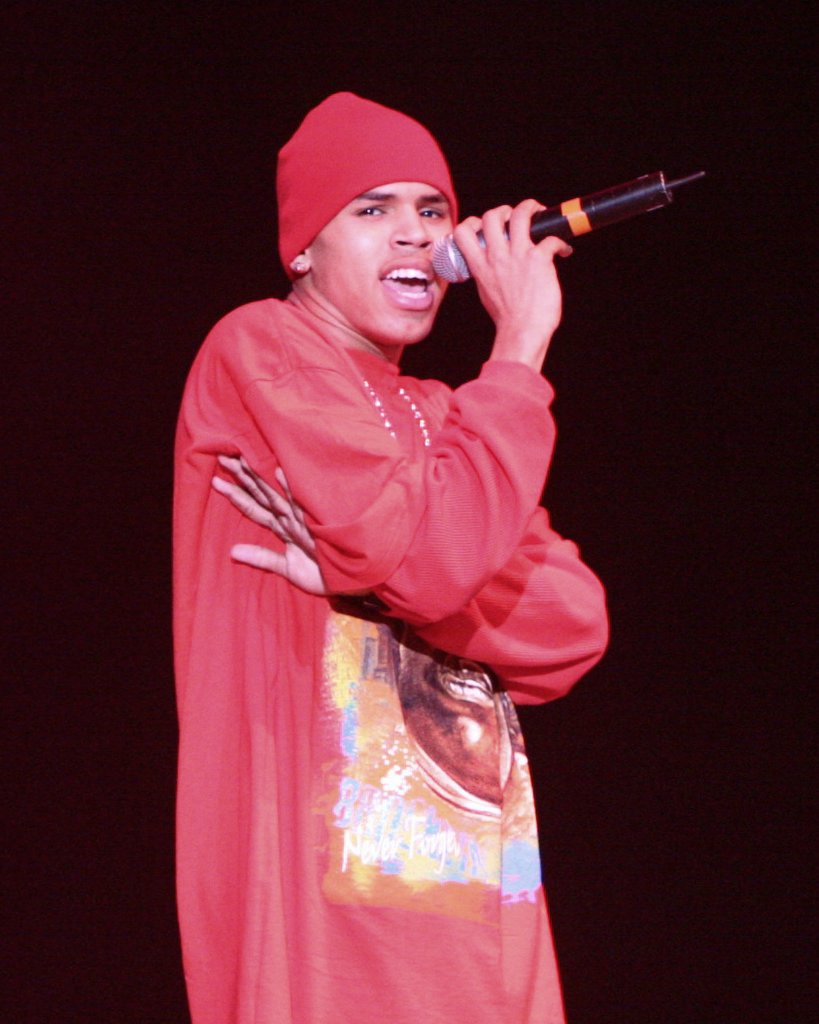
Brown performing at KBKS-FM's Jingle Bell Bash in Seattle in December 2005

After signing to Jive Records in 2004, Brown began recording his self-titled debut studio album in February 2005. By May, there were 50 songs already recorded, 14 of which were picked to the final track listing. He has worked with producers and songwriters Scott Storch, Cool & Dre, Sean Garrett, Jazze Pha, and others, and has said that they "really believed in [him]". Brown co-wrote half of the tracks. "I write about the things that 16 year olds go through every day," he said in 2005. "Like you just got in trouble for sneaking your girl into the house, or you can't drive, so you steal a car or something." The whole album took less than eight weeks to produce.

The album's lead single, "Run It!", was a great commercial success, making Brown the first male act since Montell Jordan in 1995 to have his debut single to reach the summit of the Billboard Hot 100—later remaining for four additional weeks. Three other singles, "Yo (Excuse Me Miss)", "Gimme That", and "Say Goodbye", were successful, peaking in the top 20 on the same chart. Released on November 29, 2005, the self-titled Chris Brown album debuted at number two on the Billboard 200 with first week sales of 154,000 copies. In a retrospective review, Mya Singleton from Yardbarker listed the album among "the best R&B albums of the 2000s". Chris Brown sold over four million copies in the US and was certified four times platinum by the RIAA; worldwide, it had sold six million copies as of 2009.

On June 13, 2006, Brown released a DVD entitled Chris Brown's Journey, which shows footage of him traveling through England and Japan, preparing for his first visit to the Grammy Awards, behind the scenes of his music videos and bloopers. On August 17, 2006, to further promote the album, Brown began his major co-headlining tour, The Up Close and Personal Tour. Due to the tour, production for his next album was pushed back two months. St. Jude Children's Research Hospital received $10,000 in ticket proceeds from Brown's 2006 Up Close & Personal Tour. Brown has made appearances on UPN's One on One and The N's Brandon T. Jackson Show on its pilot episode.

=== 2007–2008: Exclusive ===
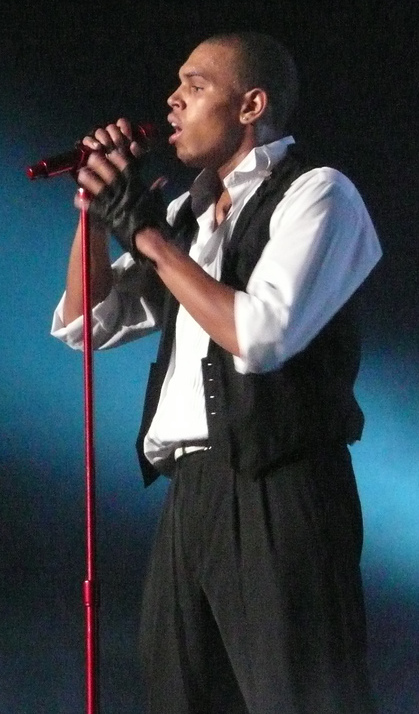
Brown performing at Brisbane Entertainment Centre in 2008

In January 2007, Brown landed a small role as a band geek in the fourth season of the American television series The O.C.. Brown then made his film debut in Stomp the Yard, alongside Ne-Yo, Meagan Good and Columbus Short on January 12, 2007. In April 2007, Brown was the opening act for Beyoncé, on the Australian leg of her The Beyoncé Experience tour. On July 9, 2007, Brown was featured in an episode of MTV's My Super Sweet 16 (for the event, it was retitled: Chris Brown: My Super 18) celebrating his eighteenth birthday in New York City.

Shortly after ending his summer tour with Ne-Yo, Brown quickly began production for his second studio album, Exclusive. The album's lead single, "Wall to Wall" was released, and peaked at number 79 on US Billboard Hot 100 chart. "Kiss Kiss", featuring T-Pain, was released as the album's second single and achieved significant success, reaching number one on the US Billboard Hot 100 and becoming his second number-one single after "Run It!" in 2005. "With You", produced by Stargate (a production duo known at the time for their work with R&B singer Ne-Yo), was released as the third single from Exclusive. It achieved greater worldwide success than "Kiss Kiss", becoming one of the all-time best-selling digital singles and reaching number two on the US Billboard Hot 100. Exclusive was released in the US on November 6, 2007. According to The Guardian the album demonstrated "his agility in fusing R&B with the era's auto-tuned strain of pop-leaning hip-hop". The album debuted at number four on the US Billboard 200 chart, selling 294,000 copies in its first week, becoming a bigger commercial success than his previous outing. Exclusive was certified four times platinum by the RIAA.

In November 2007, Brown starred as a video host for St. Jude Children's Research Hospital's Math-A-Thon program. He showed his support by encouraging students to use their math skills to help children with cancer and other catastrophic diseases. On November 21, 2007, Brown appeared as a leading role in This Christmas, a family drama starring Regina King. He also contributed to the soundtrack of the movie, which included his cover versions of "Try a Little Tenderness" and "This Christmas", the latter was later certified platinum by the RIAA. To further support the album Exclusive, Brown embarked on his The Exclusive Holiday Tour, visiting over thirty venues in US. The tour began in Cincinnati, Ohio, on December 6, 2007, and concluded on February 9, 2008, in Honolulu, Hawaii. In March 2008, Brown was featured on Jordin Sparks' single "No Air", which received worldwide success, peaking at number three on the US Billboard Hot 100 chart. He also made a guest appearance on David Banner' single "Get Like Me" alongside Yung Joc. The song peaked at number sixteen on the Billboard Hot 100, and number two on the US Hot Rap Songs chart. In 2008, Brown did of a commercial spot for Doublemint gum, creating a jingle commissioned by an advertising company working for Wrigley. Brown first created the short version for the commercial, then extended it into a full song, "Forever", during another recording session. "Forever" was later released as a single anticipating Brown's re-issue of Exclusive. The song reached number two on the Billboard Hot 100 and was noted for being his first record to venture into the dance-pop genre. Billboard wrote positively of the single, stating in its 2008 review that Brown "has proved as 2008's pop/R&B prince that he has talent and charm to command the charts for as long he chooses". The re-issue, titled Exclusive: The Forever Edition, was released on June 3, 2008, seven months after the original version, featuring four new tracks, and pushed the album's success further. During this time, Brown was recognized as one of the artists at the forefront of the digital music revolution. In August 2008, Brown guest-starred on Disney's The Suite Life of Zack & Cody as himself. Towards the end of 2008, Brown was named the Artist of the Year by Billboard magazine, with the songs “With You,” “Forever,” and “No Air” becoming three of the top-ten selling singles in the United States that year.

=== 2009–2010: Graffiti and mixtapes ===
In 2008, Brown began work on his third studio album, announced to be called Graffiti, promising to experiment with a different musical direction inspired by singers Prince and Michael Jackson. He stated, "I wanted to change it up and really be different. Like my style nowadays, I don't try to be typical urban. I want to be like how Prince, Michael and Stevie Wonder were. They can cross over to any genre of music."

Following Brown's felony assault on his then-girlfriend, singer Rihanna, on February 8, 2009, much of the media took a stance against him. The violence caused Brown to lose significant endorsements, including his deal with Doublemint, and some music stations across the US briefly banned his songs. The singer later participated in numerous television appearances that year to speak publicly about it. He spoke about it to ABC News: "I never ever had problems with anger. No, no domestic violence with any of my past girlfriends or any altercations. I never was that kind of person. I look at it, and it's really, like really difficult. It's like, 'How could I be that person?'". In the 2017 self-documentary, Welcome to My Life, Brown says his reputation dropped sharply after his 2009 assault on Rihanna, "I went from being on top of the world, number one songs, being kind of like America's sweetheart, to being public enemy number one."

Graffiti's lead single "I Can Transform Ya", featuring Lil Wayne and Swizz Beatz, was released on September 29, 2009. The song peaked at number 20 on the US Billboard Hot 100 chart. "Crawl" was released as the album's second single on November 23, 2009. The song reached number 53 on the Billboard Hot 100. Graffiti was then released on December 8, 2009. With the album, Brown took complete control of his artistry, overseeing the entire artistic direction and writing 12 of the 13 songs himself. Critics noted that with the album's sound, Brown aimed to expand his music beyond the genres of his previous work. According to Mikael Wood of Los Angeles Times, the album is made of an "upbeat" part, that "can be considered the sonic sequel to 'Forever'", mixed with power ballads, observed to express his remorse and feelings following the Rihanna incident. The album, compared to its two predecessors, was a commercial and critical failure, debuting at number 7 on the US Billboard 200 chart, selling 102,000 copies in its first week, and receiving generally negative reviews from critics. Despite this, Graffiti was nominated for two Grammy Awards; including one for the Best Contemporary R&B Album and the other for the Best R&B Performance by a Duo or Group with Vocals for the track, "Take My Time" featuring Tank. The album was certified Gold by the RIAA nearly ten years after its release.

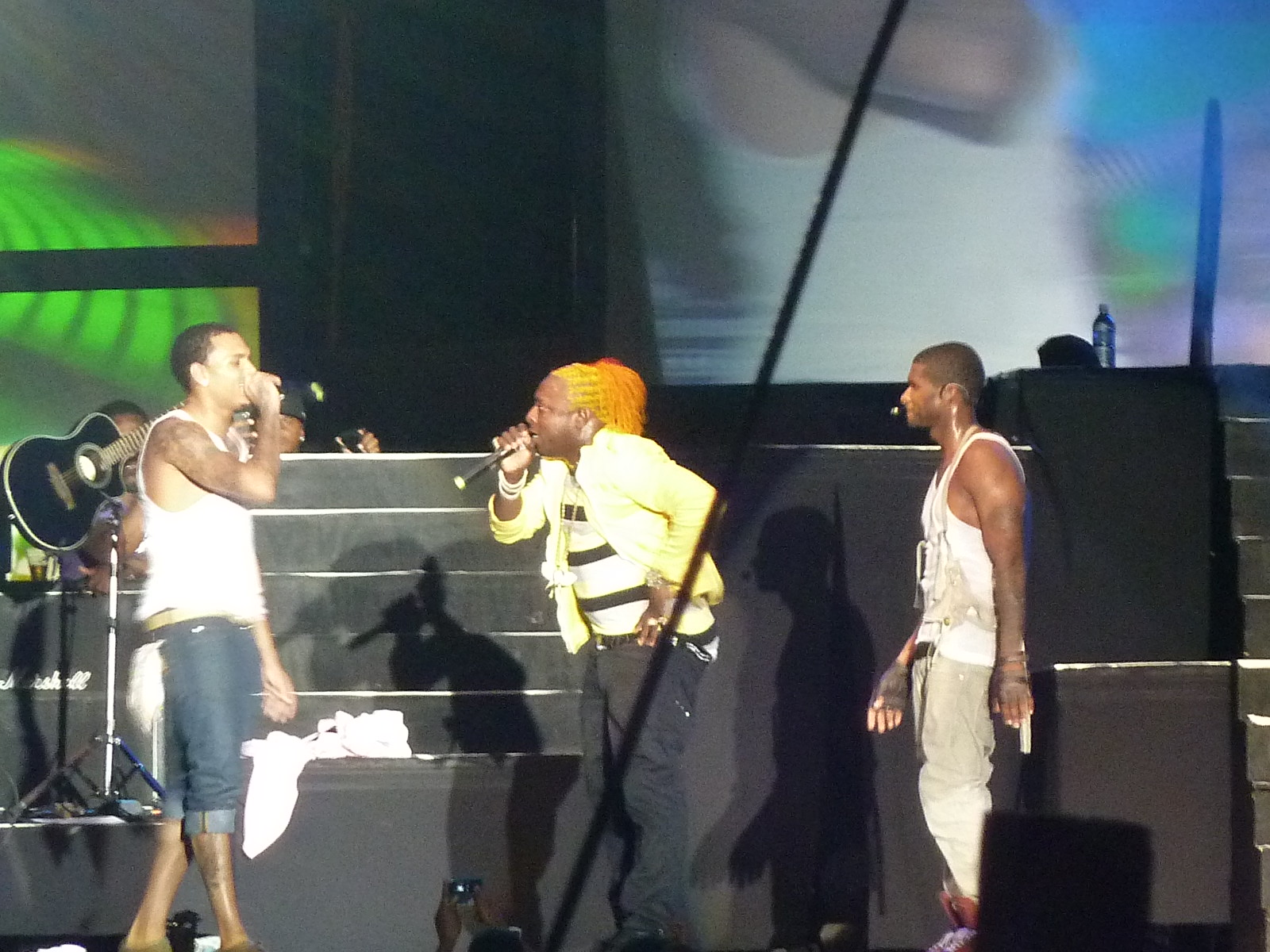
Brown performing with Usher and Elephant Man at Reggae Sumfest in 2010

While performing a Michael Jackson Tribute at the 2010 BET Awards, Brown started to cry and fell to his knees while singing Jackson's "Man in the Mirror". The performance and his emotional turmoil resonated with several celebrities present at the ceremony, including Trey Songz, Mary J. Blige and Taraji P. Henson. Songz said, "He left his heart on the stage. He gave genuine emotion. I was proud of him and I was happy for him for having that moment". Michael's brother, Jermaine Jackson, expressed similar sentiments stating, "it was very emotional for me, because it was an acceptance from his fans from what has happened to him and also paying tribute to my brother". Later during the award ceremony, Brown stated, "I let y'all down before, but I won't do it again...I promise", while accepting the award for the AOL Fandemonium prize. In August 2010, Brown starred alongside an ensemble cast, including Matt Dillon, Paul Walker, Idris Elba, Hayden Christensen and T.I. in the crime thriller Takers, and also served as executive producer of the film.

In 2010, Brown composed and released three mixtapes for free: In My Zone (Rhythm & Streets), Fan of a Fan (a collaborative mixtape with rapper Tyga), and In My Zone 2. These mixtapes showcased a new writing style for the singer, addressing edgier themes and featuring a different musical style that mixed R&B with hip hop. For these projects, he began working with new producers, most notably Kevin McCall. The projects received a positive response from his core audience, who began increasingly identifying themselves as ‘Team Breezy’ as early as 2009. The single "Deuces", from the Fan of a Fan mixtape, achieved both critical and commercial success, peaking at number one on the Billboard Hot R&B/Hip-Hop Songs chart. The song was later remixed by prominent hip-hop artists of the time, including Drake, Kanye West, André 3000, Rick Ross, Fabolous, and T.I.. Brown later released the solo track "No BS" as the second single from Fan of a Fan, then deciding to include the two singles from the mixtape as anticipation singles for his next album.

=== 2011–2012: F.A.M.E. and Fortune ===
On September 18, 2010, Brown announced the title to his fourth album, F.A.M.E.—a backronym for Forgiving All My Enemies. Brown has described his creative process for F.A.M.E. as being driven by ambition and a desire “to prove people wrong”, reflecting his determination to rebuild his career. The album’s first single, “Yeah 3x”, is a dance-pop song, marking a departure from the urban content of his previous mixtapes. The single achieved significant international success, entering the top ten in eleven countries, including Australia, Austria, Denmark, Ireland, Netherlands, New Zealand, Switzerland, and the United Kingdom. It was succeeded by the hip-hop single “Look at Me Now”, featuring rappers Lil Wayne and Busta Rhymes, which reached number one on the US Hot R&B/Hip-Hop Songs chart, where it remained for eight consecutive weeks. It also reached number one on the US Hot Rap Songs chart. The single became the best-selling rap song of 2011, as well as one of the best-selling singles of all time in the United States. Writing for Stereogum, while critiquing Brown’s public image, a reviewer praised his musical ability and the track, stating: “It brings me no joy to report that ‘Look at Me Now’ is a 10.”

Brown's fourth studio album F.A.M.E. was first released on March 18, 2011. It debuted at number one on the US Billboard 200 chart, with first-week sales of 270,000 copies, giving Brown his first number-one album in the US. Steve Jones of USA Today said that the album showed "a more mature, confident and adventurous Brown who has emerged in the wake of all the drama, and he has delivered the strongest album of his career". The album's third single, "Beautiful People", featuring Benny Benassi, peaked at number one on the US Hot Dance Club Songs chart, and became the first number-one single on the chart for both Brown and Benassi. "She Ain't You", an R&B track in which Brown pays tribute to his biggest inspiration, Michael Jackson, was released as the album's fourth US single, while "Next 2 You", featuring Canadian recording artist Justin Bieber, served as the album's fourth international single. To further promote the album, Brown embarked on his F.A.M.E. Tour in Australia and North America.

Brown received six nominations at the 2011 BET Awards and ultimately won five awards, including Best Male R&B Artist, Viewers Choice Award, The Fandemonium Award, Best Collaboration and Video of the Year for "Look at Me Now". He also won three awards at the 2011 BET Hip Hop Awards, including the People's Champ Award, Reese's Perfect Combo Award and Best Hip Hop Video for "Look at Me Now". At the 2011 Soul Train Music Awards, F.A.M.E. won Album of the Year. The album has also earned Brown three Grammy Award nominations at the 54th Grammy Awards for Best R&B Album, as well as Best Rap Performance and Best Rap Song for "Look at Me Now". On February 12, 2012, Brown won his first Grammy Award, for Best R&B Album. During the ceremony, Brown performed several songs marking his first appearance at the awards show since his conviction of felony assault.

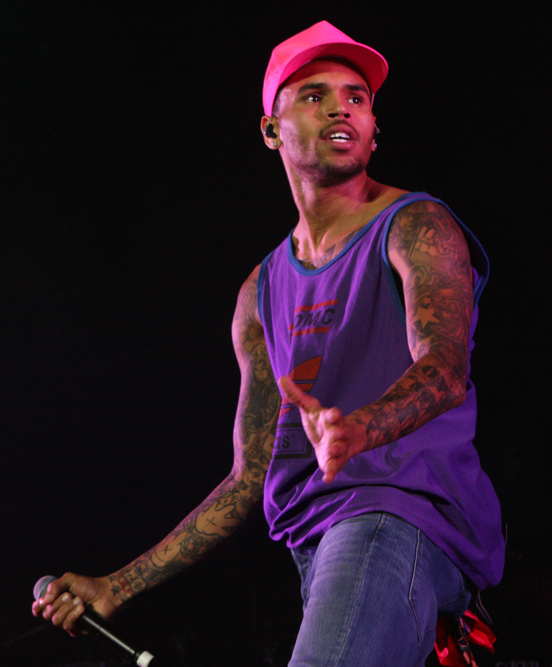
Brown performing at Supafest in Sydney, Australia, in 2012

In 2011, Brown started working on a sequel to F.A.M.E. called Fortune. On October 7, 2011, RCA Music Group announced it was disbanding Jive Records along with Arista Records and J Records. With the shutdown, Brown (and all other artists previously signed to these three labels) would release future material under the RCA Records brand. Brown's fifth studio album Fortune was promoted with the release of "Strip", "Sweet Love", "Till I Die", and the top 10 singles "Turn Up the Music" and "Don't Wake Me Up". Fortune was released on July 3, 2012. The album's musical style was noted for mixing Brown's R&B with pop and electronic music. The album debuted atop the Billboard 200, but received negative reviews from critics. Los Angeles Times wrote that the album is "brash and commercial", stating that "Brown's 'F.A.M.E.' hit with a solid combination of freaky, heavy-duty R&B bangers and the requisite sex-in-bed seduction numbers. But Fortune, his fifth studio album, is the work of an artist who has gone all-in with a handful of commercial tracks designed to get Our Hero paid and back in America's good graces". Despite the negative reception, it was nominated for Best Urban Contemporary Album at the 55th Grammy Awards. To further promote the album, Brown embarked on his Carpe Diem Tour in Europe, Africa, Asia, and Trinidad.

=== 2013–2015: X and Royalty ===
After concluding his Carpe Diem Tour in 2012, Brown's next studio album started to develop. On February 15, 2013, the singer unofficially released the song "Home", in which he reflects on the dark side of fame and suggests that his only moment of respite comes when he returns to the neighborhood where he grew up, surrounded by people who have known him from the start. On March 26, 2013, Brown announced the release of X, in various interviews and listening sessions. In an interview with Ebony, Brown spoke of taking his music in a different direction and changing his sound from the pop-infused and sexually explicit one of the previous album Fortune, to a more mature, soulful and vulnerable theme for the album. On March 29, 2013, he released the critically acclaimed "Fine China" as the lead single of X. Yahoo! lauded 'Fine China' as "a soulful, 1970's-inspired track" and said that it was "Brown's most musical sound to date".

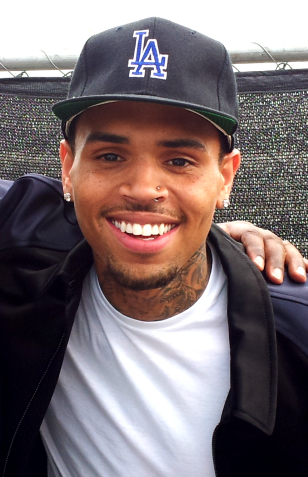
Brown backstage at the BET Awards 2013.

Following the release of two other anticipation singles of X, "Don't Think They Know" and "Love More", on August 9, 2013, at 1:09 am PDT, Brown was reported to have suffered a seizure from Record Plant Studios in Hollywood, California as a 9-1-1 call was made. When paramedics arrived, Brown allegedly refused to receive treatment and also refused to be transported to the local hospital. (Brown has reportedly suffered from seizures since his childhood.) The next day, Brown's representative reported the seizure was caused by "intense fatigue and extreme emotional stress, both due to the continued onslaught of unfounded legal matters and the nonstop negativity." On November 20, 2013, Brown was sentenced to an anger management rehabilitation center for three months, putting the December 2013 release of X in jeopardy. To "hold [fans] over until [the X album] drops," Brown released a mixtape, titled X Files on November 19, 2013. Brown revealed in 2022, that at the time, when he was on the way to go to the counseling, he received a phone call from Prince, that told him to "don't lose focus", wanting a conversation with him about "being special". Brown described the phone call as "one of [his] most influential" moments.

On February 22, 2014, it was announced that the album would be released on Brown's birthday, May 5, 2014. On April 14, 2014, Brown released a teaser of the track "Don't Be Gone Too Long" featuring Ariana Grande. However, at his May 9, 2014, court date, Brown was ordered to serve 131 days in jail for his probation violation, and the collaboration ended up never being released, furthermore, the album was again delayed. While incarcerated, the album's fourth single, "Loyal", became one of Brown's most successful songs, by selling over eight million copies in the US, and peaking in the top 10 of the US Billboard Hot 100 and the UK Singles Chart. "New Flame" featuring Usher and Rick Ross was later released as the album's final single.

Brown's sixth studio album, X was released on September 16, 2014. The album received positive reviews from critics, that considered it a big improvement compared to its critically panned predecessor Fortune. Brad Wete of Billboard reviewing X described Brown as "a talent whose skill for hit singles and agile performances is only matched by his knack for cannonballing into career-threatening pools of legal and PR problems", At the 2015 Grammy Awards, the album was nominated for Best Urban Contemporary Album, while "New Flame" was nominated for Best R&B Performance and Best R&B Song. Commercially, the album debuted at number two on the US Billboard 200 selling 146,000 copies in its first week, becoming his sixth consecutive top ten debut in the US. X has been certified double platinum by the RIAA. Pushing the promotion for the album further, Brown performed and appeared at several televised music events and music festivals across the US.

On February 24, 2015, Brown released his first collaborative studio album with Tyga, titled Fan of a Fan: The Album. The album was a follow-up to the pairs' 2010 mixtape Fan of a Fan, and its lead single "Ayo" received international commercial success. In early 2015, Brown also embarked on his Between the Sheets Tour with Trey Songz.

In March 2015, Brown was featured on DJ Deorro's song "Five More Hours", which received worldwide success. On June 24, Brown released "Liquor" as the first single from his seventh studio album, titled Royalty, which was dedicated to his daughter, who appears on the album cover. On October 13, 2015, Brown announced that Royalty would be released on November 27, 2015. After it was revealed that the album had been pushed back to December 18, 2015, on November 27, 2015, he released a free 34-track mixtape titled Before the Party as a prelude to Royalty. The mixtape features guest appearances from Rihanna, Wiz Khalifa, Pusha T, Kelly Rowland, Wale, Tyga, French Montana, and Fetty Wap. The mixtape is composed of previously unreleased tracks that Brown recorded during various studio sessions between 2012 and 2015. Royalty was released on December 18, 2015, and debuted at number three on the US Billboard 200, selling 184,000 units (162,000 in pure album sales) in its first week. Brown directed and released eight music videos for the songs on Royalty, serializing them to construct a linear story. According to Iyana Robertson of Vibe, Brown on the album "sticks to the absence of a sonic script", showcasing "a pure, palpable display of an 'outside of the box' approach to music". Robertson added that lyrically, the album "waves goodbye to amour on its way out the door", noting it as a "stark contrast to 2014's X, which included professions of affection".

=== 2016–2017: Heartbreak on a Full Moon ===
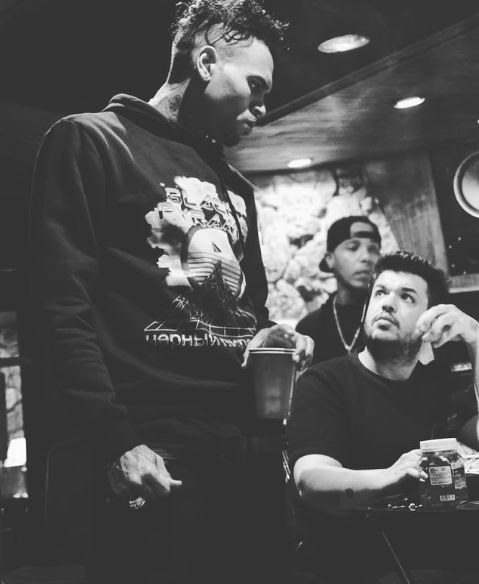
Brown (left) working on Heartbreak on a Full Moon in the studio in June 2016

Brown started working and recording tracks for his next album few weeks before the release of Royalty, in late 2015. From the first days of 2016, Brown started to preview on his social media accounts several unreleased songs from his recording sessions. In March 2016, he collaborated again with Italian DJ Benny Benassi, for the song "Paradise" from the latter's album Danceaholic. On May 3, he announced the single "Grass Ain't Greener", showing its cover art and announcing it as the first single from a new album titled Heartbreak on a Full Moon. The single was released on May 5, 2016. On July 7, after the 2016 shooting of Dallas police officers, Brown released on his SoundCloud page two piano ballads, "My Friend" and "A Lot of Love", saying that the songs are "released for free for anybody dealing with injustice or struggle in their lives." In 2016, the singer released two hip-hop collaborative mixtapes with his OHB crew, Before the Trap: Nights in Tarzana and Attack the Block.

Throughout 2016 and 2017, he continued sharing several snippets from songs that he was recording. He also built a recording studio inside of his home to work on the album. During this period he embarked two concert tours as well: the European leg of the One Hell of a Nite Tour in 2016, and The Party Tour in 2017. On December 16, 2016, he released the second official single from the album, "Party", featuring guest vocals from American R&B singer Usher and rapper Gucci Mane. Around this time, Brown decided to create Heartbreak on a Full Moon as a 40-track album. Talking about this decision, he stated in a 2017 interview that he wanted to "outdo expectations" and "push the boundaries on artistry". RCA Records, the record label of the singer, initially wasn't agreeable of satisfying Brown's intentions to make a 40-track album, thinking that it would've damaged its commercial performance, but the singer ended up convincing them. "Privacy" was later released as the album's third single. On June 7 he released Welcome to My Life, a self-documentary focused on his life and career, directed by Andrew Sandler. Numerous celebrities participated in the movie, describing Brown from a personal and professional point of view. Among them there are Jennifer Lopez, Mike Tyson, Rita Ora, Usher and Tyga.

On August 4, 2017, he released the album's fourth single, the trap song "Pills & Automobiles", featuring fellow American rappers Yo Gotti, A Boogie wit da Hoodie, and Kodak Black, while shortly after he released the fifth single, "Questions". On October 25, 2017, Brown organized with Tidal a free pop-up concert in New York City to perform the singles on the album and promote it.

Heartbreak on a Full Moon was eventually released as a double-disc album on October 31, 2017, via digital retailers and onto CD, three days later by RCA Records. He explained the concept for the album in August 2017 during an interview for Complex, saying: "I thought Heartbreak on a Full Moon was a depiction of what my soul wanted to say. It's funny because we're doing a double album. I've done so many records, but all of the records, to me, are personal favorites and I feel like it gets what I want to say across". Cultural critic and media personality Joe Budden defined Heartbreak on a Full Moon as his best album. Despite being counted for only three days of sales, Heartbreak on a Full Moon debuted at number three on the US Billboard 200, becoming Brown's ninth consecutive top 10 album on the chart. One week after its release the album was certified gold by the Recording Industry Association of America for combined sales and album-equivalent units of over 500,000 units in the US, and Brown became the first R&B male artist that went gold in a week since Jamie Foxx's Unpredictable in 2005. It has since been certified double Platinum. Heartbreak on a Full Moon is recognized for pioneering longer albums in the music streaming era, influencing urban artists such as Drake, Kanye West, and SZA to release albums featuring more than 20 tracks. On December 13, 2017, he released a 12-track surprise deluxe edition of the album, titled Cuffing Season – 12 Days of Christmas. Brown eventually embarked on his US "Heartbreak on a Full Moon Tour" in June 2018 to further promote the album. The opening acts for the tour were 6lack, H.E.R., Rich the Kid, and Jacquees.

=== 2018–2019: Indigo ===
On January 31, 2018, shortly after President Donald Trump's 2020 State of the Union Address, Brown released for free the track "State of the Union", a ballad where he expresses a message about social harmony. In February 2018, Brown and rapper Joyner Lucas announced an upcoming collaboration project, titled Angels & Demons, with the release of the single "Stranger Things". However, the project ended up never being released. On March 15, 2018, Brown was featured on Lil Dicky's hit single "Freaky Friday". The song became one of the most successful comedy songs in contemporary pop music, topping the charts in New Zealand and the United Kingdom, also entering the top 10 in the US.

Following the end of the "Heartbreak on a Full Moon" tour, Brown started to work on his ninth album, Indigo. On January 4, 2019, Brown released "Undecided" as its lead single. "Undecided" saw Brown reunite with producer Scott Storch, who previously worked with Brown in 2005 on his breakout hit "Run It!". The single marked Brown's first release after signing an extension and a new license agreement with RCA Records, that gave him the owning of his master recordings, making him one of the youngest artists to do so at the age of 29. On April 11, he released the second single off the album, "Back to Love". Andy Kellman of AllMusic described the song as a "career highlight", although it failed to chart in the US. The third single, "Wobble Up", was released a week later, featuring Nicki Minaj and G-Eazy. On April 25, he appeared on a track with Marshmello and Tyga called "Light It Up". On May 31, he appeared on the commercially successful single "Easy", where he duetted with singer DaniLeigh. On June 8, Brown released "No Guidance", featuring Drake, as a single. The song followed the conclusion of a highly publicized feud between Brown and Drake that began in 2012. It debuted at number nine on the US Billboard Hot 100, making it Brown's 15th top-ten song, and later peaked at number five. The single was certified Diamond by the RIAA, won Best Collaboration Performance, Best Dance Performance and Song of the Year at the 2019 Soul Train Music Awards, and received a nomination for Best R&B Song at the 62nd Grammy Awards.

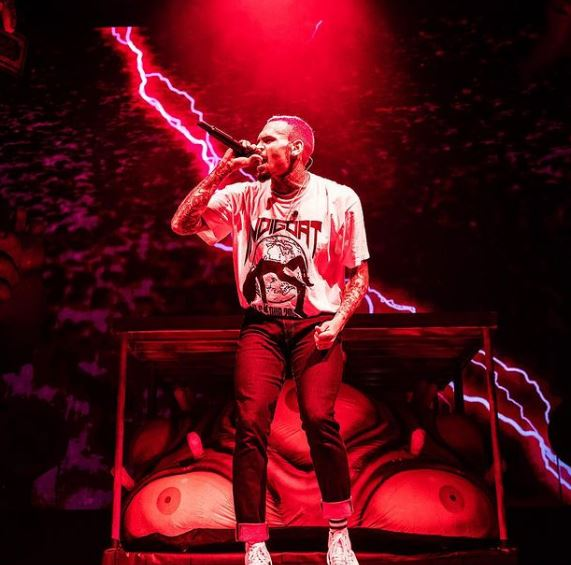
Brown performing during his Indigoat Tour in 2019

Indigo was eventually released on June 28, 2019, marking Brown's second double album. Musically, the album explored his R&B roots, as well as other genres such as Afrobeats, pop, dancehall, and bounce music. According to A.D. Amorosi of The Inquirer, the album's themes mix spiritual awakening with sexuality. In the US, Indigo debuted at number one on the US Billboard 200 with 108,000 album-equivalent units in its first week, making it his third number-one album in the country. Indigo was further promoted with the release of the single "Heat", which topped the Billboard Rhythmic Airplay chart, earning Brown his 13th number one on that chart, and his second during 2019. On October 4, 2019, Brown released a deluxe version of Indigo entitled Indigo Extended, which included 10 additional songs, bringing the total track count to 42.

On June 10, 2019, Brown announced an official headlining concert tour, the "Indigoat Tour," in which he performed the album throughout the US. The tour began on August 20 and ended on October 19. Jay Cridlin of Tampa Bay Times attended the Tampa concert, and reviewing it, he said it was "a guilty pleasure," wondering if enjoying his stage presence should be wrong, considering the controversies surrounding his public figure, expressing: "At what point do we -- can we, should we -- forget about the blowups and restraining orders, and just marvel at the way Brown splits into a backflip and kick-spins a 360 during 'Drunk Texting'?". The "Indigoat Tour" grossed over $30,100,000 in its 37 shows, selling out most of the venues. At the end of the year, Brown was ranked third on Billboard's "Top R&B/Hip-Hop Artists of the Decade" for the 2010s, behind Rihanna and Drake in second and first, respectively.

=== 2020–2023: Breezy ===
On April 29, 2020, Brown announced the release of a collaborative mixtape with Young Thug, Slime & B. It was released on May 5, and features the hit single "Go Crazy", which peaked at number 3 on the Billboard Hot 100, becoming Brown's first song to spend one full year on the chart. In April 2021, "Go Crazy" broke the record for the longest running No. 1 song on R&B/Hip-Hop Airplay, a record previously held by Brown's 2019 hit single "No Guidance". On May 1, 2020, Brown was featured on Drake's Dark Lane Demo Tapes mixtape, on the track "Not You Too". The song earned Brown his 100th career entry on the US Billboard Hot 100, debuting at number 25.

On July 9, 2020, Brown announced that his tenth album would be titled Breezy, a reference to his stage nickname. On January 14, 2022, he released the single "Iffy", which peaked at number one on the Rhythmic Radio Chart on April 3. On March 27, 2022, Brown co-headlined a F1 post-race concert for the 2022 Saudi Arabian Grand Prix. On April 1, Brown released the album's second single, "WE (Warm Embrace)". The song was listed among the "Top 5 R&B Songs of 2022" by Vibe, which stated it "will go down in history as one of Chris Brown's most timeless songs." On April 26, Brown announced his US summer tour "One of Them Ones" with rapper Lil Baby. The tour included 27 stops in North America and kicked off on July 15. Brown performed at Drai's After Hours Nightclub at The Cromwell Las Vegas on June 11, to mark the launch of his new multi-year residency at the venue.

On June 17, 2022, Brown released an Afrobeats collaboration with Nigerian singer Wizkid titled "Call Me Every Day". Breezy was released on June 24, by RCA Records and CBE and debuted at number four on the Billboard 200. On July 8, an expanded version of the album with nine new songs was released. At the 65th Grammy Awards, the deluxe edition of Breezy was nominated for Best R&B Album, but lost to Robert Glasper's Black Radio III. Following Glasper's winning, Brown mocked him and The Recording Academy on social media, later apologizing to the American musician, congratulating him, stating he was not the intended target.

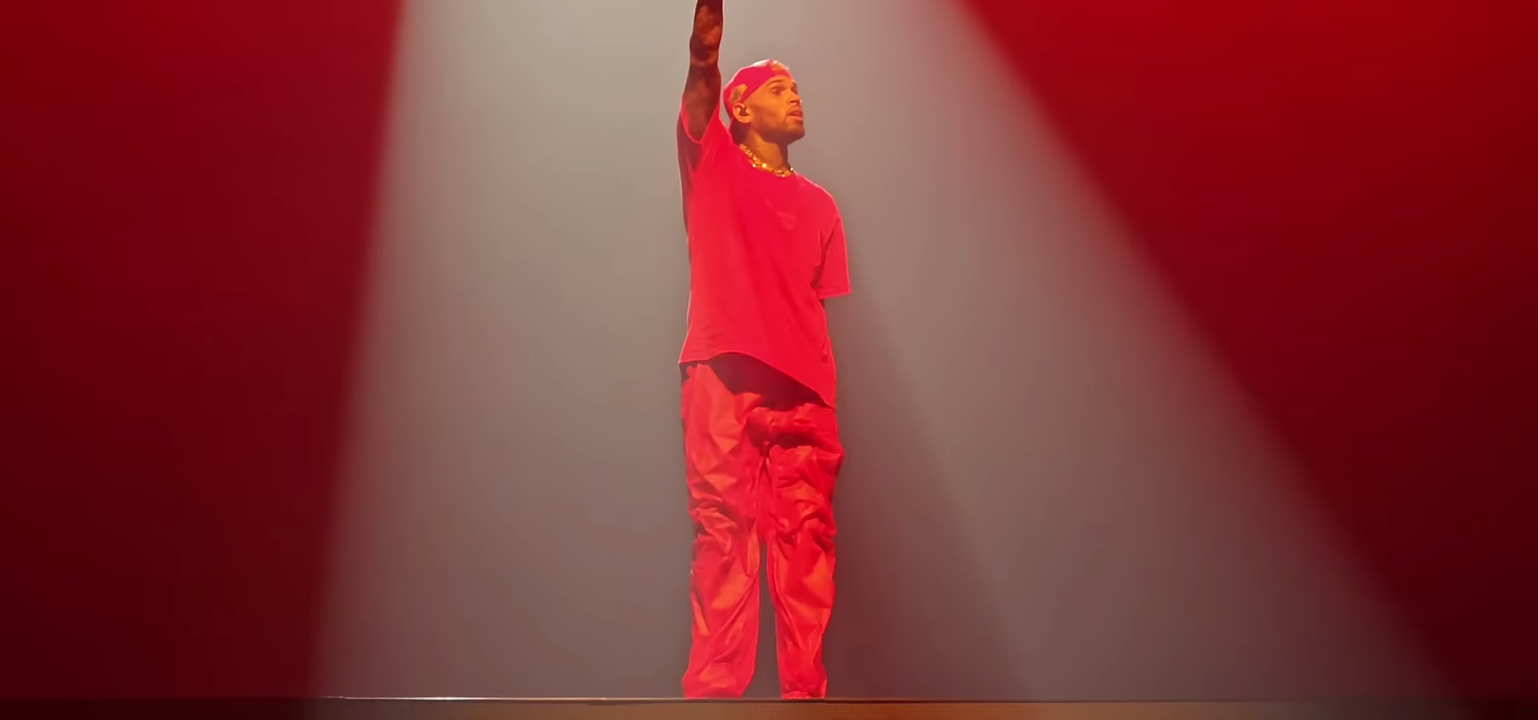
Brown performing at The O2 Arena in London during his Under the Influence Tour.

On September 4, 2022, Brown won international artiste of the year at the 15th annual Headies awards. The category is designed for non-African artists or groups with achievements and impact on Afrobeats. In summer 2022, his song "Under the Influence", included in the extended edition of his 2019 album Indigo, went viral on TikTok, achieving significant commercial success globally. With "Under the Influence", Brown became the first R&B singer to chart over fifty top‑40 hits on the Billboard Hot 100. On October 14, Brown appeared as a special guest at Usher's Las Vegas Residency to perform few songs. Usher told Brown: "You're a legend. We love you and we gon' continue to keep lifting you up". On November 16, 2022, Brown released two Christmas-themed songs: "No Time Like Christmas" and "It's Giving Christmas".

On November 18, Brown announced that the American Music Awards had canceled his tribute performance to Michael Jackson for the 40th anniversary of Thriller. Brown shared rehearsal footage of the tribute and stated it was cancelled for unknown reasons. The cancellation prompted backlash against the AMAs from fans and industry peers. Jermaine Dupri stated: "If the American Music Awards canceled the Chris Brown performance, then that means they canceled the 40th anniversary of Thriller. Which means they canceled the Michael Jackson tribute. Black Music, we in trouble." John Branca, the co-executor of the Michael Jackson Estate stated that the AMAs should be ashamed and the cancellation was an attack on Black Music. Following the success of "Under the Influence", the title gave its name to the European tour that Brown embarked upon in 2023, the "Under the Influence Tour", which sold out for all 24 arena dates scheduled, with 7 additional dates being added, also sold out. The tour included six nights at London's O2 Arena, three at Accor Arena in Paris, three at Ziggo Dome in Amsterdam and more. Prior to the start of the tour, the opening act Skillibeng withdrew and was replaced by South African singer Tyla. The tour marked Brown's first in Europe since the 2016 European leg of his One Hell of a Nite Tour. The tour marked Brown's first concerts in the UK following the revoking of his ban from entering the country, implemented in 2010.

In January 2023, Brown surpassed Elvis Presley for the most RIAA gold-certified singles among male vocalists, after passing Presley for the most Billboard Hot 100 entries among male vocalists. In March, Brown became the fifth artist in Billboard history to reach 10 No. 1s on Billboard's R&B/Hip-Hop Airplay chart with "Under the Influence". In April, Brown co-headlined Rolling Loud Thailand in its inaugural year, alongside Travis Scott and Cardi B. On August 4, the single "How We Roll" in collaboration with Ciara was released. On August 27, Brown headlined a concert from Jamaica National Stadium, titled Chris Brown and Friends Live In Jamaica, as apart from his 'Under the Influence Tour'.

=== 2023–2025: 11:11 and Breezy Bowl XX ===
In June 2023, Brown released "Summer Too Hot", the lead single of his eleventh album. The song was nominated at the 66th Annual Grammy Awards for Best R&B Performance. Brown announced that his next album would be titled 11:11, revealing the album's concept being connected to the numerological belief of the same name. On October 20, 2023, Brown released the Afrobeats song "Sensational" featuring Nigerian artists Lojay and Davido, as 11:11's second single. "Sensational" eventually peaked at #1 on both Urban and Rhythmic radio, as well as on Billboard Mainstream R&B/Hip-Hop Airplay Chart, and was nominated for a Grammy Award for Best African Music Performance. On November 7, 2023, Brown released the single "Nightmares" featuring Byron Messia.

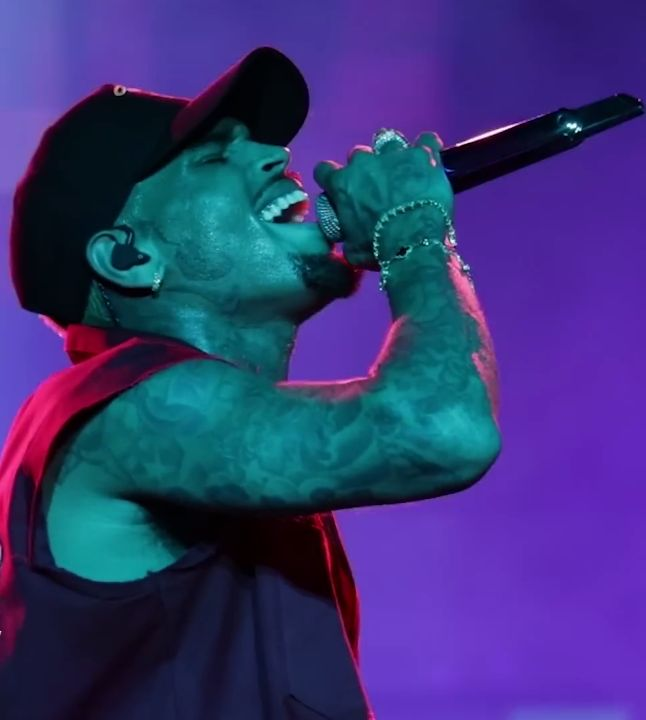
Brown performing at Jamaica National Stadium in 2023.

11:11 was released on November 10, 2023. The album marks Brown's third double album, with its two sides containing 11 tracks each. The album's musical style mixes R&B, pop music, Afrobeats and dancehall. Reviewing 11:11, Kayla Sandiford of Renowned for Sound stated that on the record "Brown does well to demonstrate his dynamic vocal quality". In the US, 11:11 debuted at number nine on the US Billboard 200, making it his 12th consecutive top-ten album in the country.

Towards the end of 2023, Brown headlined different concerts in the Middle East. The singer addressed the Gaza war at the end of a Dubai, UAE concert, saying there's 'a lot of evil and a lot of genocide going on in the world right now', urging his audience, particularly the younger generation, to embrace love and positivity and expressed his appreciation for the support of his fans using words in Arabic. 'InshaAllah, mashaAllah, I love you,' he said. In December 2023, Vevo reported that Brown was the 6th most watched artist in the US and 10th most watched artist globally for the 2023 calendar year, amassing 413.7 million views in the US and 1.4 billion views globally. In January 2024, with Tee Grizzley's single "IDGAF" featuring Chris Brown and Mariah the Scientist, he became the first artist in the 21st century to have charted on the Billboard Hot 100 for twenty consecutive years . On March 5, 2024, Brown announced "The 11:11 Tour", a North American arena tour featuring singers Ayra Starr, Muni Long and Maeta as supporting acts.

On April 11, 2024, the singer released 11:11 (Deluxe), the expanded edition of his eleventh album, containing 13 additional tracks. Among the tracks contained, the song "Freak" features a verse where the singer directly disses American rapper Quavo. The rapper responded the following day with "Tender", a diss track aimed at Brown, leading the latter to release "Weakest Link" the following week. From May 17 to June 5, Brown released four consecutive music videos in the span of four weeks for the following songs off the 11:11 (Deluxe): "Go Girlfriend", "Press Me", "Feel Something" and "Hmmm" featuring Davido. on December 14 and 15, 2024, he held two concerts at Johannesburg's FNB Stadium, Africa's largest stadium, attracting a total attendance of 189,472 across both shows. This achievement made him the highest-selling artist in the stadium's history. On December 21 and 22, he ended the tour with two sold-out shows at the 55,000 capacity Allianz Parque Stadium in São Paulo, Brazil. His performances in South Africa and Brazil have collectively been referred to as the "Breezy Bowl" by his fans. Brown ultimately incorporated footage from "The 11:11 Tour" into his 2025 music video for the Grammy-nominated song "Residuals". On February 2, 2025, Brown's 11:11 (Deluxe) won the Grammy for "Best R&B Album" at the 2025 Grammy Awards, marking this as Chris Brown's second win in the category and his second win overall, with his first being for his 2011 album, F.A.M.E.

On March 27, 2025, Brown announced a global stadium tour titled the ‘Breezy Bowl XX,’ featuring special guests Summer Walker and Bryson Tiller, created to celebrate the landmark 20th anniversary of his career. The tour went on to become the highest-grossing tour to date by a solo Black American male artist, generating nearly $300 million. In an editorial about the tour, Craig Jenkins of Vulture argued that it "makes an unsubtle case for the singer as a pivotal force in R&B, hip-hop, and pop by barreling through dozens of disparate highlights (...) His voice spirits a lot of people away to happier, less haunted times. And the glimmer of lost innocence in his tone has proved much more magnetic than anything he has done to throw the audience off." In 2025, Billboard ranked him as the top R&B artist of the year.

=== 2026–present: Brown ===
On April 10, 2026, Brown and Usher announced they would be co-headlining a North American stadium tour titled "The R&B Tour". On May 8, 2026, Brown released his 12th studio album titled Brown, whose title is a backronym for Break Rules Only When Necessary. The album debuted at number seven on the US Billboard 200 with 65,000 album-equivalent units in its first week, making it his 13th consecutive top-ten album in the country. On June 19, 2026, Brown released a deluxe version of the album titled Brown: The Chocolate Edition with 10 additional tracks.

== Artistry ==
=== Influences ===
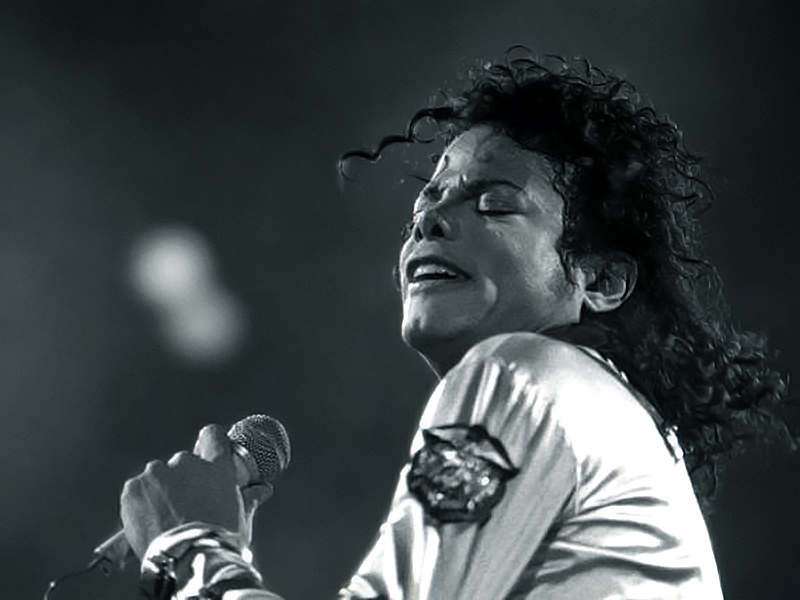
Michael Jackson in 1988. He is cited as the main inspiration for Brown to make music.

Brown has cited a number of artists as his inspiration, predominantly Michael Jackson. Brown emphasizes "Michael Jackson is the reason why I do music and why I am an entertainer." In "She Ain't You", "Fine China" and "Back to Love", he exemplifies Jackson's influence both musically and visually. Ebony magazine's Britini Danielle asserted that "Fine China" was "reminiscent of Michael Jackson's Off the Wall". Choreographically, MTV noticed that it "takes distinct visual cues from classic clips like 'Smooth Criminal' and 'Beat It'", while Billboard complimented his appearance by calling it "a modern way to channel the King of Pop". Usher is also another influence who comes across as a more contemporary figure for Brown. He tells Vibe magazine "He was the one who the youngsters looked up to. I know that we, in the dancing and singing world, looked up to him", and maintains "If it wasn't for Usher, then Chris Brown couldn't exist". Other influences include Marvin Gaye, Sam Cooke, Ginuwine, Phil Collins, Bobby Brown and R. Kelly. He has cited Naughty by Nature, Tupac, Lil' Wayne and Rakim as his hip-hop influences.

=== Musical style ===
Brown's musical style typically blends R&B with hip-hop and pop, along with other genres. His pure side of R&B is densely shown throughout his discography, being exemplified by songs like "No BS", "Don't Judge Me", "Back to Sleep" and "Residuals". Music critics have commended Brown's musical contribution, recognizing his versatility, and considering him an evolver of R&B music.

Iyana Robertson of Vibe, talking about his introduction to the genre, said: "As traditional R&B flourished around him, the young singer began an evolution of the genre". She saw his debut single "Run It!" as a "prelude to what Brown would continue to do for the next decade: relentlessly disrupt the constructs of rhythm and blues." By his second album Exclusive, she says he was "tapping more electric up-tempos, swimming deep in hip-hop waters and annihilating the pop arena". Describing the Grammy Award winning F.A.M.E. as "his most diverse offering to date", containing songs that mixed many genres including R&B, pop, hip-hop, dancehall, rock and Europop, she remarked, "There was no level of musical flexibility comparable. There still isn't." F.A.M.E. is considered to be the album that defined Brown's musical style and persona. Fortune was noted for featuring a more electronic musical direction, containing genres such as house music and EDM. According to AllMusic, different tracks of the X album are "soul-driven", while on others "Brown combines memorable hooks with some stellar production work on rubbery disco-funk". Disco and funk are also showcased on singles like "Zero" and "Fine China". Royalty and Heartbreak on a Full Moon further explored alternative R&B and trap, with the latter also containing dancehall records. Throughout his career, Brown has consistently incorporated hip-hop influences into his music, being regarded as an influential artist bridging R&B and hip-hop. Following his 2010 mixtapes, he approached the genre differently, starting to rap occasionally on mixtapes, guest appearances, and on few tracks from his albums. His dance-pop side, which started with the single "Forever" from his second album Exclusive, continued through his early-2010s Europop singles "Yeah 3x", "Beautiful People", "Turn Up the Music" and "Don't Wake Me Up", though this sound became less common in his later music. On the albums Indigo and 11:11 Brown incorporated Afrobeats in his music.

==== Themes ====
Brown's lyrical production is typically considered to be "emotional" or "hedonistic". His songs mainly cover themes of sexuality, desire, regret, romantic love, heartbreak, recklessness and internal conflict, also having some introspections over the dark side of celebrity. Along with his vocal and dancing abilities, his songwriting is considered to be one of the things that distincts him for the better compared to other R&B singers of his time. American media executive and radio personality Ebro Darden stated that Brown is the "most all-around talented person in R&B. Trey Songz is talented, but he can't dance like Chris Brown. Usher is probably the only one that could come close to him, but he doesn't have the songwriting abilities that Chris Brown has."

Brown said in 2013, during an interview for Rolling Stone, that his songs are always "derived from personal experiences. Then again, I always like mixing reality with art." Billboard reviewing Royalty found its content to be "an art imitating life thing". Vulture's writer Craig Jenkins, while reviewing Heartbreak on a Full Moon, noted in its "breakup tracks" a usage of "shattered, jilted reflection", while the sexual records' lyrics were described for being explicit.

=== Voice ===
Brown possesses a light lyric tenor voice, which spans three and a half octaves, rising from the bass F♯ (F2) to its peak at the soprano C♯.(C♯6) His vocal ability was first recognized by his mother at a young age, as Brown tells People magazine, "I was 11 and watching Usher perform 'My Way', and I started trying to mimic it. My mom was like, 'You can sing?' And I was like, 'Well, yeah, Mama.'" subsequently leading to the start of his career. "Take You Down" most notably earned him a Grammy award nomination for Best Male R&B Vocal Performance in 2009.

Often described as a dynamic vocalist, Brown's vocal performances are characterized by harmonization, vocal runs and melisma. Stereogum stated that "Brown's voice is an undeniably powerful instrument, one of those endlessly elastic soulful tenors, and he knows exactly how to flex it without flaunting it". While his voice on his first two albums, Chris Brown and Exclusive, was considered to be "youthful", due to his age, with subsequent projects like Graffiti and F.A.M.E. it was noted for maturing to a more distinctive voice, with Brown "coming into his own as a singer". On F.A.M.E. critics noted huge flexibility in his voice, with Steve Jones of USA Today praising the singer's ability to "give top notch vocal performances in R&B, Europop, rap, rock and acoustic records". X and Indigo were noted for displaying his timbre, exemplifying his singing performances.

According to Billboard, his singles "Liquor" and "Go Crazy" are representative of Brown's harmonizing. "Lost & Found", "Time for Love", "No Guidance" and "Red", feature "energic" vocal performances, being noted for displaying a "wide emotional range" in his singing. On "Another Round", "Don't Judge Me" and "It Won't Stop", he showcases "soft vocals" through a "soothing tone". According to Slant Magazine, different tracks from his Heartbreak on a Full Moon album showcase the singer's falsetto, being "a reminder that Brown's voice is capable of sublime beauty". Jake Indiana of Highsnobiety said that his feature on Kanye West's song "Waves" is one of his best vocal performances, and that it "sounds like ascending to heaven with a choir of angels at your back". On "Look at Me Now", "No Romeo No Juliet" and "Stranger Things" he displayed his ability of fast-rapping.

=== Dancing ===
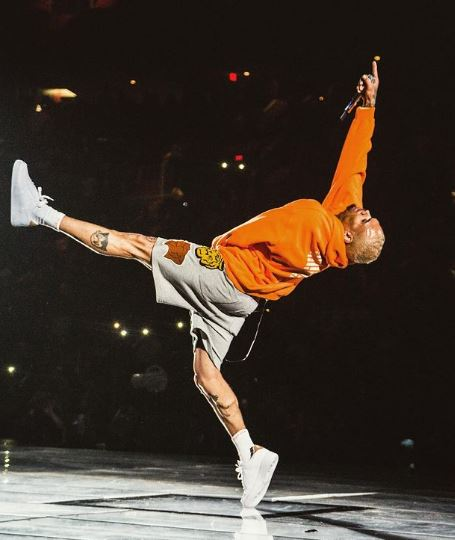
Brown dancing on stage during his Party Tour in 2017

Brown's dancing abilities and stage presence are widely praised, receiving broad comparisons to those of Michael Jackson. According to Brown, he taught himself how to dance by imitating Jackson's moves since childhood, then developing his own distinct style throughout his career. Brown also mentioned MC Hammer as an inspiration to his dancing style. His stage presence is often described as energetic, featuring acrobatic moves such as backflips, frontflips, aerial stunts and somersaults, while his choreography draws on hip‑hop fundamentals and street‑dance, including styles and moves such as popping, krumping, bopping, gangsta walking, gliding, Chicago stepping, the Dougie and Melbourne shuffle. Some critics have described his dancing as the highlight of his live performances.

Most of his music videos feature complex choreography, including the "futuristic" "Turn Up the Music", the Jackson-inspired choreography of "Fine China", "Zero", where he displayed different dancing styles, including popping and his "signature spin move", "Party", where he showcased his acclaimed footwork, and "Heat", described by The Source as featuring "silky smooth choreography that shows Brown's unmatchable dancing talent". He told Prestige in 2012 that he conceives his music videos as mini movies, directing several of them, combining music and dance while also telling a story. Brown said that in his music videos he also wants to "incorporate all the new dances that are hot in the streets and that people are watching." Some of his most notable dancing live performances include his "Thriller" recreation at the 2006 World Music Awards, his medley at the 2011 MTV Video Music Awards, which included flying parts, and his 2015 freestyled dancing over Future's "March Madness" at the Vestival The Hague Malieveld, featuring an acclaimed front-flip.

In films such as Stomp the Yard and Battle of the Year, Brown displayed his ability to breakdance while in-character.

=== Street art ===
Aside from his musical career, Brown was noted for markedly producing graffiti art. His visual works have been described as "manga-inspired" and "abstract".

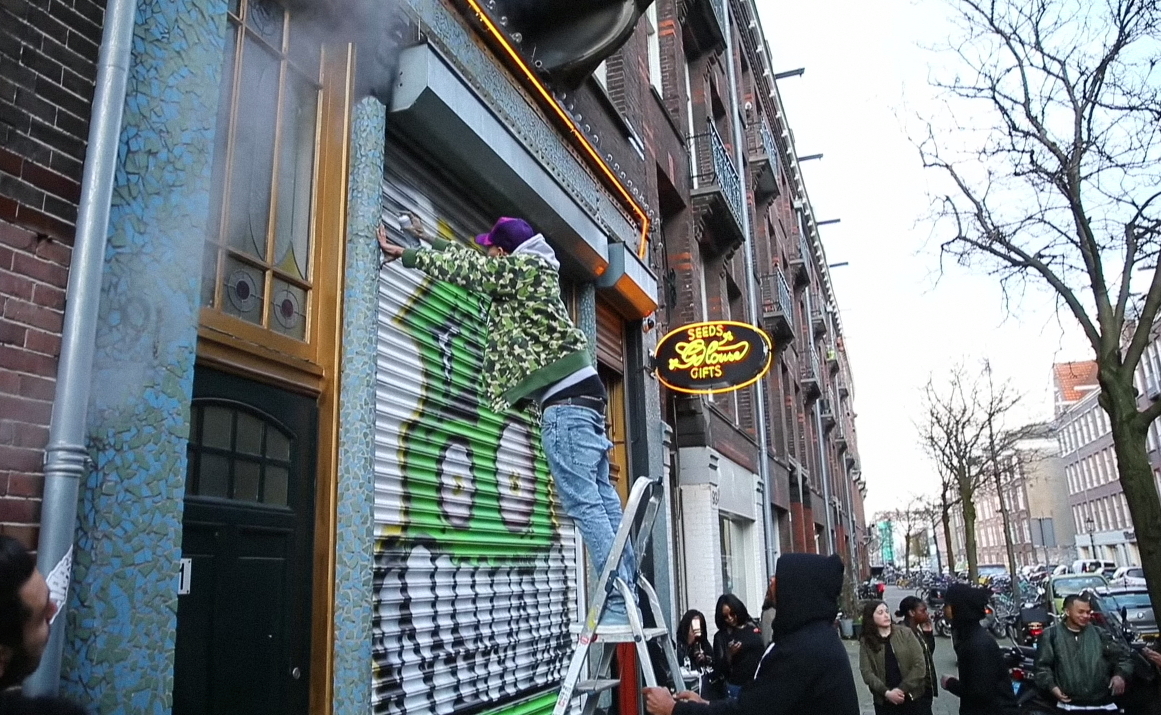
Chris Brown painting a shop shutter in Amsterdam (2016)

Brown has produced street art under the pseudonym Konfused, partnering with street artist Kai to produce works for the Miami Basel. The singer painted the buildings of different radio stations such as Hot 97 (WQHT). In 2015 he worked on some of the walls of The Grammy Museum, mixing his spray paint drawings with images of James Brown, Prince, Michael Jackson and himself. Brown has made graffiti works for different cities worldwide, including Los Angeles, London and Amsterdam.

His painting and dancing abilities were shown at the same time when Brown, partnering with Spotify's Rap Caviar, painted Heartbreak on a Full Moon's album cover, mostly from dancing around the canvas. In 2020 he painted a mural in memory of Kobe Bryant, doing a portray that includes Kobe's face, a mamba, and a few pictures of Kobe dribbling and dunking a basketball.

=== Acting ===
Brown has also pursued an acting career. In 2007, he made his on-screen feature film debut as a supporting role in the dance drama Stomp the Yard and took a leading role in the Christmas comedy film This Christmas (2007). He portrayed Will Tutt in three episodes on the Fox television series The O.C. in 2007. He also guest starred as himself on the children's programs Sesame Street in 2007, The Suite Life of Zack & Cody in 2008, and in the Comedy Central series Tosh.O in 2011. He has continued to act inconsistently in films such as the heist thriller, Takers (2010), which he also executive produced, the romantic comedy Think Like a Man (2012), and the dance film Battle of the Year (2013). He produced and starred in a documentary on himself entitled Welcome to My Life (2017). Reviewing the documentary, Rachel Leah of Salon talked about what the singer said on domestic violence, stating: "Chris Brown's actions are inexcusable, but what he says about male violence is vital". Brown returned to film playing a supporting role in the sports comedy film She Ball (2021).

He also made a guest starring appearance as a rapper in the ABC sitcom Black-ish in the Season 3 episode, "Richard Youngster". The episode received controversy and criticism for its casting of Brown with Caroline Framke of Vox writing, "Casting Brown as the linchpin of an episode all about double standards and oblivious men doing wrong by black women is astonishingly tone-deaf — and a major misstep from a show that usually makes a point of knowing better." The show's creator Kenya Barris defended Brown's casting saying, "We wanted someone to play a troubled music star, which he was... It had been 10 years since the Rihanna incident, which happened when he was a kid, basically, 19 years old, I saw him out, and he was very contrite and wanted to do something. I felt like, let's do that."

== Achievements and awards ==
In terms of music sales and accolades, Brown is one of the most commercially successful and award-winning artists in R&B music, often being referred to by contemporaries as the "King of R&B". Brown has sold over 140 million records worldwide, making him one of the world's best-selling music artists. He is also one of the highest-grossing African American touring artists of all time. Brown is also one of the best selling digital artists of all time. As of 2026, Brown has certified 141.5 million digital singles in the US and tied for 9th overall among all artists across genres. Brown has sold over 40 million albums worldwide since his debut, including 18 million in the US. In July 2022, Brown overtook singer The Weeknd for the most charted songs on Billboard's nearly 10-year-old Hot R&B Songs chart. Brown ranks ninth among all artists with the most consecutive charting weeks on the Billboard Hot 100 with a streak of 161 weeks.To provide an overall picture of Brown's chart success, Billboard ranked him third overall in the top R&B/Hip-Hop artists of the 2010s decade. He was only surpassed on the list by Drake and Rihanna in first and second, respectively. In January 2024, Brown became the first artist in the 21st century to have charted on the Billboard Hot 100 for at least 20 distinct and consecutive calendar years.

In terms of radio success and achievements, Brown is tied with Beyoncé for the 4th most #1's on the Billboard R&B/Hip-Hop Airplay chart. Moreover, Brown has fifty-three Top 10 entries on the Billboard R&B/Hip-Hop Airplay Brown also holds the record for the two longest running #1 hits on the Billboard R&B/Hip-Hop Airplay since the chart was first established in 1992. In January 2020, Brown initially set the record for longest running #1 on this chart with his 2019 single "No Guidance", which remained number 1 for twenty-seven weeks. The following year, Brown broke his own record for the longest running #1, with his 2020 single "Go Crazy", which remained number 1 for twenty-eight weeks. Moreover, Brown has the 3rd most #1's on the Billboard Mainstream R&B/Hip-Hop Airplay chart with 18. On the Billboard Rhythmic Airplay chart, Brown is in a 4-way tie with Usher, The Weeknd and Bruno Mars for 3rd most #1 singles on the chart with 13. Brown has a total of 117 entries on the Rhythmic Airplay chart.

In terms of awards and accolades, Brown has won a total of 224 awards from 578 nominations over the course of his career. Among which include 2 Grammy Awards, 21 BET Awards, 4 BET Hip Hop Awards, 5 Billboard Music Awards, 5 American Music Awards, 60 ASCAP Awards, 49 BMI Awards, 14 Soul Train Music Awards, 3 MTV Video Music Awards, 1 MTV Australian Award, 4 iHeartRadio Music Awards, 1 iHeartRadio Titanium Award, 1 International Dance Music Award, 1 Kora Award, 2 MOBO Awards, 1 TRL Award, 12 NAACP Image Awards, 2 Nickelodeon Awards, 2 People's Choice Awards, 1 Ozone Award, 7 Teen Choice Awards, 8 Urban Music Awards, 38 Vevo Certified Awards, 1 World Music Award, 1 Headies. Brown is the second most decorated artist in the history of the BET Awards, behind Beyoncé. Brown is also tied with Bruno Mars as the second most decorated artist in the history of the Soul Train Awards, behind Beyoncé. Brown is tied with Rihanna for the seventh most Vevo Certified Awards with 38 and holds the record for the most Vevo certifications among male R&B artists. Moreover, Brown was ranked fourth among the top ten highest performing US artists on Vevo of the 2010s decade, behind Taylor Swift, Eminem, and Justin Bieber in first, second and third, respectively. Brown is also the first American artist and the only R&B artist to ever win a Headies award for outstanding achievements in the Nigerian music industry. Brown won his Headies in the category of international artist of the year, which was designed to recognize non-African artists or groups with outstanding achievements and impact on Afrobeats. In 2026, Brown was awarded an honorary doctorate in Visual & Performing Arts by Harvest Christian University.

== Impact ==
Brown has been cited as an influence by several artists of different genres within international popular music, including Justin Bieber, Zayn Malik, Lil Yachty, Bryson Tiller, Normani, Ella Mai, Jay Park, Maluma, Ozuna, Harmonize, Jacquees, 6lack, YNW Melly, Eric Bellinger, Tone Stith, Rauw Alejandro, Jimin of BTS, Jongup, Dadju, B. Smyth, DaniLeigh, Tory Lanez, Ty Dolla Sign, Layton Greene, Lizzo and more. Bieber in 2019 called him the “best entertainer of all time.” Similarly, in 2026 R&B singer Monica called him "the greatest entertainer that is left here on earth". Ella Mai has named Brown as one of her principal musical influences, while critics described his influence on her melodies as "unmistakable". Zayn Malik described Brown as a “massive inspiration and influence.”

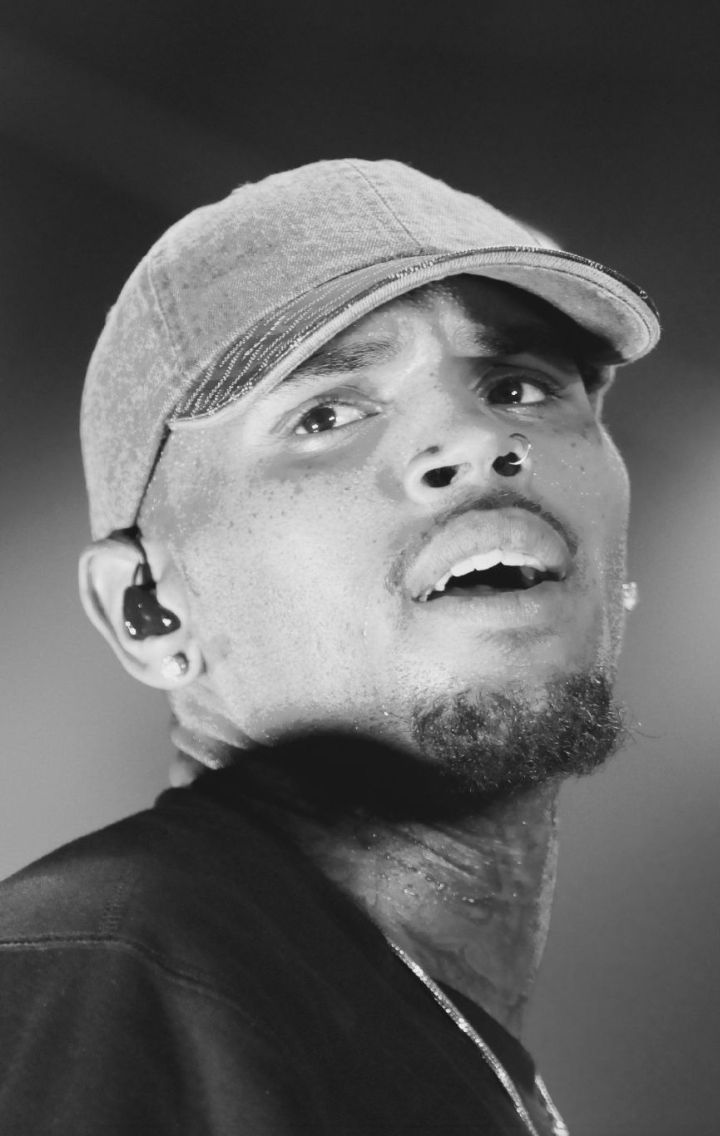
Brown performing in Tampa, Florida, during his 'One Hell of a Nite Tour'.

Brown has frequently been referred to as the "King of R&B" by fellow artists and music publications. In 2014, The Source published an article titled "Chris Brown: The King of Rhythm & Blues?", arguing that his decade-long dominance of contemporary R&B and his combination of singing, dancing and performance ability placed him among the genre's leading artists. XXL later described Brown as "arguably the one that holds the crown as the king of R&B", citing his longevity and prolific hitmaking. During the 2018 debate over Jacquees' claim to the title, R&B singer Tank identified Brown among the genre's legitimate kings and subsequently said that the crown belonged to him, while Wiz Khalifa and Charlamagne tha God also named Brown as the singer deserving the title. In 2024, rapper Fat Joe explicitly called Brown "the king of R&B" and argued that his combination of singing, dancing, rapping and overall stage performance placed him closer to Michael Jackson than any contemporary artist. In 2025, R&B singer Bobby Brown similarly chose Chris Brown over Usher when asked which contemporary artist had come closest to Jackson, praising him as a "dancer, a singer, a full performer" and saying: "Nobody's doing it like him."

The Los Angeles Times described his debut in the mid-2000s as the best of the rising movement of teenage singing-dancing R&B performers. His first album was credited for its role in ushering in a new generation of R&B artists. Brown's influence continued in R&B's increasingly fluid relationship with hip hop during the 2010s. Okayplayer called In My Zone (2010) a mixtape that helped "shaping the direction of R&B", mentioning Brown's singing and rapping performances, mixtape approach and development of the "Bad Boy of R&B" persona as influential. Fan of a Fan (2010), his collaborative mixtape with Tyga, was credited as a notable release of the early-2010s "swag" and "jerk" era in hip hop, helping bring it to a wider audience. His 2011 single "Look at Me Now", where Brown rapped alongside Lil Wayne and Busta Rhymes, was credited with bridging the eras of hip hop by combining early 2010s "swag rap" with the approach of earlier generations. "Show Me", performed with Kid Ink and produced by DJ Mustard, placed Brown's R&B vocals over Mustard's minimalist and bass-heavy West Coast production, helping bring the emerging hyphy sound into mainstream R&B and pop. Producer Scott Storch, during a 2022 appearance on Drink Champs, said, "Chris Brown changed R&B music", comparing him to "the Michael Jackson of our generation". Producer Bryan-Michael Cox also credited Brown as an evolver of the genre.

Brown's influence has also been documented in Latin music. Rauw Alejandro has cited Brown as his biggest influence and said he studied his choreographies while growing up. Maluma has named Brown as an inspiration, while Ozuna has cited him among his North American influences. Mixing engineer Jaycen Joshua has also cited Brown's influence on reggaeton, recalling that Colombian producers studied his recordings and sought to emulate their low-end sound. Joshua said this influence carried over into the best-selling Latin single of all time, "Despacito" by Luis Fonsi and Daddy Yankee, which Joshua mixed.

Brown has also become an influential figure in Afrobeats, particularly through collaborations with leading African artists such as Wizkid and Davido. His collaborations with Wizkid, Davido, Rema and Lojay have blended his R&B style alongside contemporary African music, with BET describing him as an "Afrobeats hitmaker", highlighting his ability to combine his R&B sound with Afrobeats. His 2012 performance in Lagos, where Wizkid joined him onstage, also became an early point of connection between the two artists. The Guardian later described Brown as "definitely part of the story" of Wizkid's international development. In 2022, Brown became the first American artist to win International Artist of the Year, an award recognizing non-African artists for achievements and impact on Afrobeats. Tanzanian artist Harmonize has also described Brown as a "big inspiration", particularly for his dancing.

Brown's influence has also extended to K-pop, particularly through the genre's incorporation of American R&B, hip hop and singer-dancer performance styles. Jay Park cited Brown as an inspiration while discussing his approach to combining singing and rapping, saying that he wanted to become "a singer who can be good at both singing and rapping like [Brown]". Spin also identified Brown as one of the American pop-culture benchmarks for Park's music as he developed a more urban-oriented sound in Korea. Jimin of BTS has likewise cited Brown as part of the R&B music he was recommended by the other BTS members while he was a trainee.

== Personal life ==
=== Relationships ===
From 2007 to 2009, Brown dated singer Rihanna until he assaulted her, injuring her face and causing her hospitalization. In 2010, Brown briefly dated model Jasmine Sanders. In 2011, Brown briefly dated media personality Draya Michele. Later during the same year, Brown began dating Karrueche Tran. In January 2013, Rihanna confirmed that she and Brown had resumed their romantic relationship, stating, "It's different now. We don't have those types of arguments anymore. We talk about shit. We value each other. We know exactly what we have now, and we don't want to lose that." Speaking of Brown, Rihanna also said, "He's not the monster everybody thinks. He's a good person. He has a fantastic heart. He's giving and loving. And he's fun to be around. That's what I love about him – he always makes me laugh. All I want to do is laugh, really – and I do that with him". Rihanna and Brown collaborated again on "Nobody's Business", a duet song off Rihanna's Unapologetic album. The song was noted by critics as a public response by the couple towards the public perception of their intimacy. In a May 2013 interview, Brown stated that he and Rihanna had broken up again. He subsequently reunited with Tran but they split up in 2015.

=== Family ===
Brown is the father of four children, each with a different woman: two daughters (born in 2014 and 2022) and two sons (born in 2019 and 2026).

=== Religion ===
When discussing his upbringing, Brown stated, "We were used to two pairs of shoes for a school year. We used to go to church every day. I was one of those kids that had more church clothes than school clothes." He has also discussed his second work of grace, saying that "he experienced the Holy Ghost while performing 'His Eye Is on the Sparrow' in church". After being released from jail on June 2, 2014, Brown wrote that he was "Humbled and Blessed" and tweeted the words "Thank you GOD."

In 2015, he said during an interview for Vibe, that God is the only thing that he is afraid of. Speaking about prayers he said "I pray everyday, I think we pray unconsciously too. Personally I don't pray for success. I pray for knowledge for understanding and peace of mind. I really try to pray for that because it's a big world, and you can get wrapped up in it trying to please every city. So I just try to get a peace of mind and me understanding that being at peace with my flaws and my talents. I'm cool with that. That's why I think once He shows me certain things, or even the choices that I make, and decisions that I make that are healthy for me. He shows me the right path. When I bless other people, He always blesses me. It's not even about a self-serving journey; it's about just learning. I want to learn people's experiences. I want to give them experiences too."

=== Mental health ===
Brown has long struggled with mental health issues and addiction. In his Welcome to My Life documentary, Brown revealed that he had contemplated suicide following his assault on Rihanna. In 2013, Brown was sentenced to 90 days in rehab by a Los Angeles Superior Court judge to fulfill the terms of his probation. While at the rehab facility, Brown was formally diagnosed with bipolar II disorder and post-traumatic stress disorder. The rehab facility stated that Brown will require close supervision by a physician "to ensure his bipolar mental health condition remains stable. It is not uncommon for patients with post-traumatic stress disorder and bipolar II to use substances to self-medicate their biochemical mood swings and trauma triggers". The clinical team at the rehab facility attributed Brown's aggression to his untreated mental health disorder, severe sleep deprivation, inappropriate self-medicating and untreated PTSD.

In a 2014 interview with radio personality Ebro Darden, Brown revealed that prior to his 2013 incarceration, he used "the syrup, the Xanax," and added that marijuana offset his hyperactive tendencies, "once I started doing the lean, the other stuff ... I'd be sitting in the [recording] booth sleeping." In 2017, Billboard wrote an investigative article about Brown's mental health issues and addiction. Former members of Brown's team told Billboard that around April 2015 he had broken a 15-month stretch of sobriety and spiraling into a more frequent drug use in the first months of 2016, including the use of cocaine, xanax, marijuana, molly and lean. Additionally, his former security guards revealed they would often check Brown's pulse while he slept to ensure he had not overdosed.

== Legal issues ==
Brown has been involved in numerous legal issues since 2009, when he pleaded guilty to felony assault against his then-girlfriend, the singer Rihanna. He was sentenced to five years of probation, community service, and mandatory domestic violence counseling. In the years since, Brown has faced a number of civil lawsuits and criminal cases arising from allegations of assault and other misconduct. While most allegations were dismissed or dropped, he was criminally convicted three times.

=== Felony assault on Rihanna ===
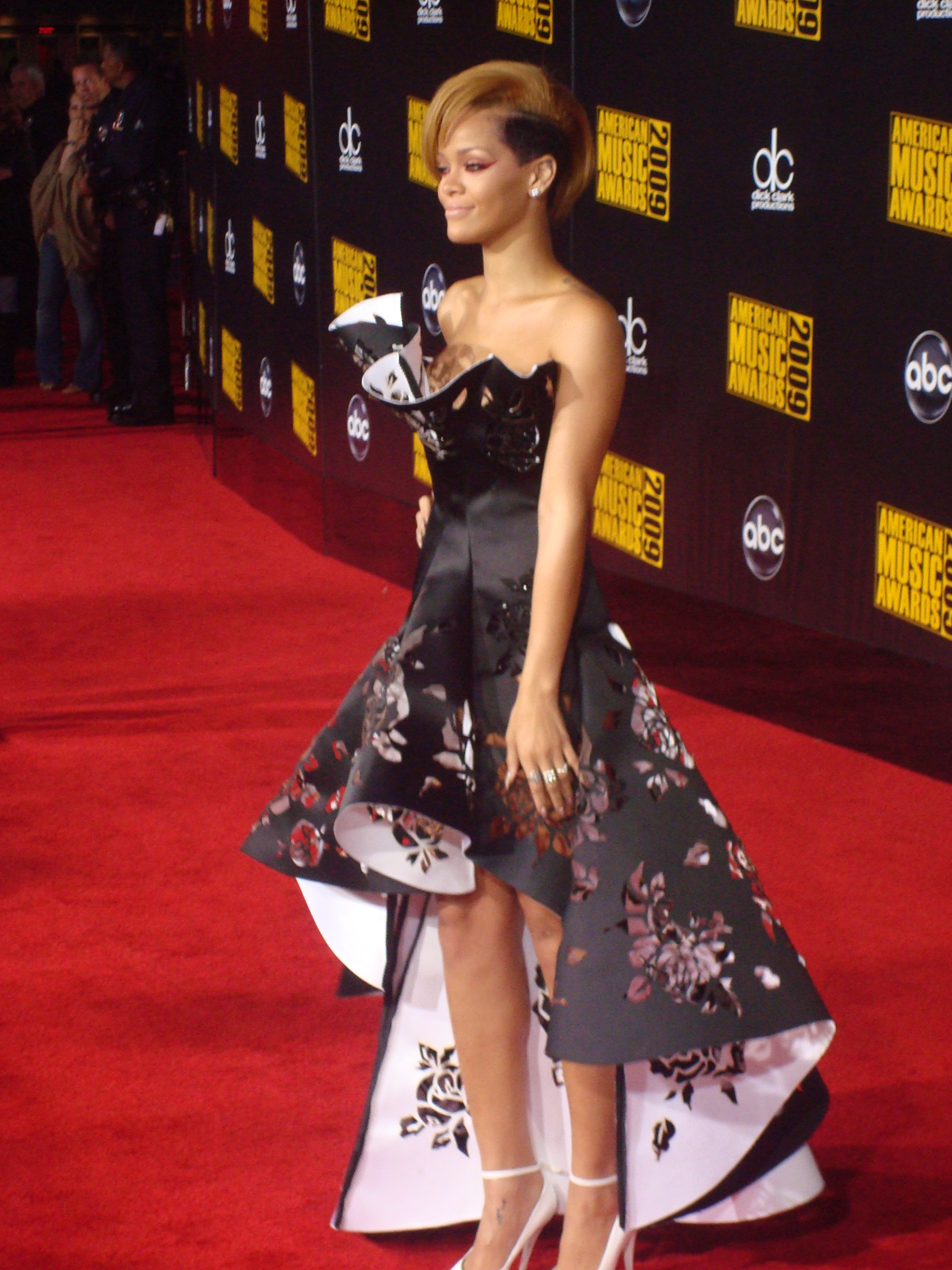
Rihanna in November 2009, nine months after Brown assaulted her

At around 12:30 a.m. (PST) on February 8, 2009, 19-year-old Brown and his then-girlfriend, the 20-year-old singer Rihanna, had an argument that escalated into physical violence, with Brown causing Rihanna visible facial injuries that required hospitalization. Brown turned himself in to the Los Angeles Police Department's Wilshire station at 6:30 p.m. (PST) and was booked under suspicion of making criminal threats. On June 22, 2009, Brown pleaded guilty to felony assault and accepted a plea deal of community labor, five years of probation, and domestic violence counseling. On August 25, Brown received five years of probation. He was ordered to attend one year of domestic violence counseling and undergo six months of community service; the judge retained a five-year restraining order on Brown, which required him to remain 50 yards (45.72 meters) away from Rihanna, reduced to 10 yards at public events.

In February 2011, at request of Brown's and Rihanna's lawyers, Mark Geragos and Donald Eltra, Judge Patricia Schnegg modified the restraining order to a "level one order", allowing both singers to appear at awards shows together in the future. On March 20, 2015, Brown's probation ended, formally closing the felony case emanating from the Rihanna assault that happened over six years prior.

=== 2013 arrest ===
In July 2013, Brown's probation was revoked after he was involved in an alleged hit and run in Los Angeles. He was released from court and scheduled to reappear in August 2013 to learn whether he would serve time in prison. The charges would later be dropped, but Brown would have 1,000 additional hours of community service added to his probation terms. In October 2013, Brown was arrested for felony assault in Washington, D.C., after refusing to take a picture with a man, and throwing a punch that broke the man's nose. The charge was reduced to a misdemeanor. Brown spent 36 hours in a Washington jail and was taken to court in shackles. He was released and ordered to report to his California probation officer within 48 hours.

On October 30, 2013, Brown voluntarily entered rehab. After Brown completed his 90 days, the judge ordered him to remain a resident at the Malibu treatment facility until a hearing on April 23, 2014. The deal was if Brown left rehab, he would go to jail. On March 14, 2014, Brown was kicked out of the rehab facility and sent to Northern Neck Regional Jail for violating internal rules. He was expected to be released on April 23, 2014, but a judge denied his release request from custody either on bail or his own recognizance. At his May 9, 2014, court date, Brown was ordered to serve 131 days in jail for his probation violation. He was sentenced to serve 365 days in custody; however, the judge gave him credit for 234 days he had already spent in rehab and jail, as well as credits for good behavior while behind bars. Brown was released from jail on June 2, 2014.

=== London nightclub affray case ===
On May 15, 2025, Brown was arrested in Manchester, England, on a 2023 warrant issued against him for a grievous bodily harm with intent charge. The charge resulted from an alleged incident which involved Brown smashing a Don Julio 1942 tequila bottle over music producer Abraham Diaw's head while at Tape, a private members' club in Mayfair, London.

On May 16, Manchester Magistrates' Court denied bail and remanded Brown in custody pending trial at Southwark Crown Court in London. On May 21, at a renewed bail application hearing at Southwark Crown Court, Brown was granted bail on the condition that he lodge a £5 million security fee with the court (£4 million immediately, with £1 million due within a week). The bail conditions enabled Brown to continue his scheduled tour. He appeared at Southwark Crown Court on June 20, 2025, where he pleaded not guilty to attempting to cause grievous bodily harm with intent. On July 11, he entered not guilty pleas to two further charges: assault occasioning actual bodily harm and possession of an offensive weapon (the bottle), relating to the same incident. His bail did not initially allow him to leave the UK, but this was changed around October 2025.

He appeared at Southwark for a pre-trial hearing on January 28, 2026, and sentencing is scheduled for October 26, 2026, alongside co-defendant Omololu Akinlolu (known as HoodyBaby), an American recording artist. In a pre-trial hearing on July 24, 2026, Brown and Akinlolu pleaded guilty to the charge of affray.

On October 26, 2026, Brown and Akinlolu were sentenced. Brown was given a suspended sentence of imprisonment for eight months, suspended for one year. Akinlolu was given a suspended sentence of four months, also suspended for one year. Judge Anthony Baumgartner described Brown's actions as "serious, public violence". In addition, both men were ordered to pay £1,500 in costs.

== Business ventures ==
In 2007, Brown founded the record label CBE ("Chris Brown Entertainment" or "Culture Beyond Evolution"), under Interscope Records. Brown has since signed frequent collaborator Kevin McCall, singer Sabrina Antoinette, former RichGirl member Sevyn Streeter, singer-songwriter Joelle James, and rock group U.G.L.Y. However, from 2014 the label started to sign exclusively Brown's works.

In October 2009, Brown founded a lifestyle website, Mechanical Dummy, with the purpose of curating and promoting current trends in the world of technology, music, culture, fashion, style and emerging brands. Brown served as the creative director of the site.

Brown has stated in 2015 he owned fourteen Burger King restaurants, later revealing in 2022 that he sold the portfolio. In November 2012, Brown launched a nonprofit charity organization called the "Symphonic Love Foundation" to financially support arts programs for kids and to support a number of health and education programs and nonprofits, which provide education on domestic abuse, dating violence and HIV/AIDS and leadership programs to children with developmental disabilities.

In May 2012, Brown partnered with the artist Ron English to create a limited-edition toy and sculpture line, "Dum English", which they debuted at the Toy Art Gallery in Los Angeles.

In November 2013, Brown partnered with Sprayground, a New York backpack company, to launch a limited line of custom backpacks, the "Invasion Capsule Collection".

On November 11, 2021, the singer launched his own cereal, "Breezy's Cosmic Crunch", partnering with SoFlo Snacks for this limited edition of collectible breakfast cereal.

In May 2022, Brown partnered with Los Angeles based clothing brand Renowned and an online media company BlackNFTArt, to launch an NFT collection, "The Auracles", with accompanying physical streetwear pieces. In July 2022, Brown released a NFT collection, "The Breezyverse", consisting of 10,000 3D animated NFTs with sound and visual effects implemented on the Ehtereum blockchain. The Breezyverse NFT collection was released in conjunction with Brown's tenth studio album Breezy.

In September 2023, Brown partnered with California-based cannabis brand and dispensary Originals, to launch Bussin, a recreational cannabis brand.

In October 2023, Faraday Future, a California-based startup focused on the development of electric vehicles, announced a partnership with Brown in which he would become an ambassador of the company.

In March 2024, Brown launched a line of disposable vapes, the CB 15K x Chris Brown Disposable Vape.

=== Fashion ===
In 2012, Brown launched a streetwear clothing line called Black Pyramid, in collaboration with the founders of the Pink + Dolphin clothing line. In 2016 the clothing label was set for larger release, partnering with streetwear clothing lines such as Snipes for a worldwide distribution, also being distributed through its own Black Pyramid boutiques.

On December 11, 2015, the Japanese fashion brand A Bathing Ape revealed that Brown would become the face of the brand's high end range, BAPE Black Label. Which was a follow-up to the brand's inaugural celebrity partnership fronted by fellow artist Travis Scott.

In 2016, Brown partnered with German streetwear company Snipes, for a summer capsule collection designed in collaboration with the singer. The same year Brown also served as a model for Philipp Plein's fall and winter campaign.

In May 2023, Brown partnered with German 3D printed footwear company Zellerfeld, designer Nos Ailes, and streetwear and culture company The Auracles to launch his own line of 3D printed slides, NAMI.

== Discography ==
Solo studio albums

- Chris Brown (2005)
- Exclusive (2007)
- Graffiti (2009)
- F.A.M.E. (2011)
- Fortune (2012)
- X (2014)
- Royalty (2015)
- Heartbreak on a Full Moon (2017)
- Indigo (2019)
- Breezy (2022)
- 11:11 (2023)
- Brown (2026)

Collaborative studio albums

- Fan of a Fan: The Album (with Tyga) (2015)

== Tours ==
Brown is one of the highest grossing African American touring artists of all time. According to Billboard Boxscore, as of October 2025, Brown’s career grosses surpassed $500 million, reaching $511.4 million from 4.9 million tickets sold across 322 reported shows.

=== Headlining ===
- Up Close and Personal Tour (2006)
- The UCP Exclusive Tour (2007)
- Fan Appreciation Tour (2009)
- F.A.M.E. Tour (2011)
- Carpe Diem Tour (2012)
- One Hell of a Nite Tour (2015–2016)
- The Party Tour (2017)
- Heartbreak on a Full Moon Tour (2018)
- Indigoat Tour (2019)
- Under the Influence Tour (2023)
- The 11:11 Tour (2024)
- Breezy Bowl XX (2025)

=== Co-headlining ===
- Between the Sheets Tour (with Trey Songz) (2015)
- One of Them Ones Tour (with Lil Baby) (2022)
- The R&B Tour (with Usher) (2026)

=== Supporting ===
- Scream V Encore Tour (2005)
- The Beyoncé Experience (Australia) (2007)
- Good Girl Gone Bad Tour (the Philippines, Oceania) (2008)

== Filmography ==
=== Film ===
Year	Title	Role
2007	Stomp the Yard	Duron Williams
2007	This Christmas	Michael "Baby" Whitfield
2010	Takers	Jesse Attica
2012	Think Like a Man	Alex
2013	Battle of the Year	Rooster
2021	She Ball	T.A.K.O.

=== Television ===
Year	Title	Role	Notes
2005	Access Granted	Himself	Episode: "Chris Brown: Yo"
2005	Soul Train	Himself	Episode: "Chris Brown/The Pussycat Dolls/Na'sha"
2006	Showtime at the Apollo	Himself	Episode: "Chris Brown/YoungBloodZ"
2006	One on One	Himself	Episode: "Recipe for Disaster"
2006	Saturday Disney	Himself	Episode: "Word Up"
2006	So You Think You Can Dance	Himself	Episode: "Top 10 Results"
2006	In the Mix	Himself	Episode: "Episode #3.5"
2006	All of Us	Brandon	Recurring Cast: Season 2
2007	The O.C.	Will Tutt	Recurring Cast: Season 4
2007	Sesame Street	Himself	Episode: "The Bookaneers"
2007	Walmart Soundcheck	Himself	Episode: "Chris Brown"
2007	Generations	Himself	Guest Star
2007	106 & Park Top 10 Live	Himself/Host	Episode: "August 8, 2007"
2007	B InTune TV	Himself	Episode: "Episode #2.8" & "#2.12"
2008	The Suite Life of Zack & Cody	Himself	Episode: "Doin' Time in Suite 2330"
2008	Star Academy	Himself	Episode: "October 17, 2008"
2008	Australian Idol	Himself	Episode: "Top 6 Verdict"
2010	The Rachel Zoe Project	Himself	Episode: "Hustling for Haiti"
2011	Inside West Coast Customs	Himself	Episode: "Chris Brown's First Love"
2011	Saturday Night Live	Himself	Episode: "Russell Brand/Chris Brown"
2011	When I Was 17	Himself	Episode: "Chris Brown, Joe Jonas, Selita Ebanks"
2011	Funk Flex Full Throttle	Himself	Episode: "Episode #2.2"
2011	Tosh.0	Himself	Episode: "Board Breaker"
2015	American Idol	Himself	Episode: "Winner Announced"
2015	Punk'd	Himself	Episode: "K. Michelle & Chris Brown"
2015	Real Husbands of Hollywood	Himself	Episode: "Hart Medication: Part 2"
2015	Ballbustaz Tv	Himself	Episode: "Black Pyramids"
2016	From tha Bottom 2 tha Top	Himself	Episode: "Dope Music Festival"
2016	Big Boy's Big Brawl	Himself	Episode: "Pilot"
2017	Black-ish	Richard Youngsta	Episode: "Richard Youngsta"
2024	Coulda Been House	Himself	Episode: "You Got Served"

=== Documentary ===
Year	Title
2007	Chris Brown: Journey to South Africa
2012	Bad 25
2017	Chris Brown: Welcome to My Life

== See also ==
- List of artists who reached number one in the United States
- List of highest-certified music artists in the United States
- List of best-selling music artists
- List of Billboard Hot 100 chart achievements and milestones
- List of most-followed Instagram accounts
