= The Party Tour (Chris Brown) =

2017 concert tour by Chris Brown

- Tour by Chris Brown
- Promotional poster for the tour
- Start date: March 31, 2017
- End date: May 23, 2017
- Legs: 1
- No. of shows: 33 in North America

Chris Brown concert chronology
- One Hell of a Nite Tour (2015–16); The Party Tour (2017); Heartbreak on a Full Moon Tour (2018)

The Party Tour was the seventh concert tour by American singer Chris Brown. The tour only visited the United States, with Brown performing over 30 concerts during the spring of 2017. It is reported the tour earned $18.7 million.

== Background ==
Following the cancellation of his boxing match against rapper Soulja Boy, the tour was officially announced by Brown in February 2017 through his Instagram account.

Like his previous tour, the bill featured numerous artists in the hip hop scene, including 50 Cent, O.T. Genasis, Kap G, Fabolous, Casanova and French Montana. While Montana was on the initial roster, his name was later removed when the tour was officially announced. 50 Cent dropped out of the tour last minute. Many media outlets reported disagreements with production as the reason for the cancellation. The rapper claimed his contract was never finalized and he was still filming a movie during the time of the tour. Other artists that appeared on singular dates of the tour were Kendrick Lamar, Usher and Future. While on tour the singer was working on his eighth studio album Heartbreak on a Full Moon, already having released three singles off of it, "Grass Ain't Greener", "Party", with this tour being named after it, and "Privacy", that were performed to promote the upcoming release of the project.

== Critical reception ==
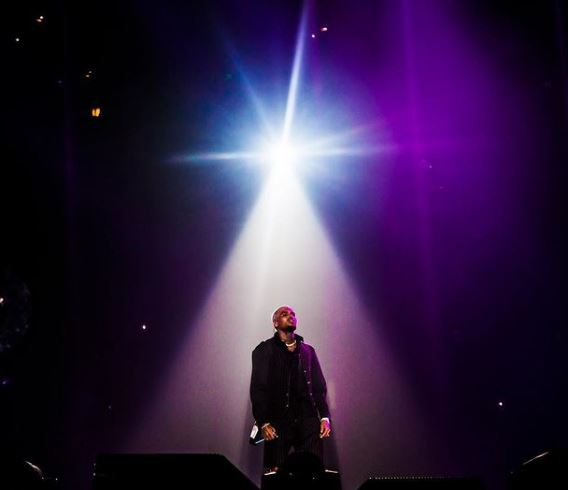
Brown performing on the tour

The tour received mixed to positive reviews from critics. Nathan Paige (The Plain Dealer) writes the show in Cleveland did a good job of showcasing his talents. He continues: "Even though Brown's stint in Cleveland was solely to showcase his talents and appease his fans, it's difficult to write an objective review without thinking of some of his unfavorable behavior in recent years. Brown's fans either love him despite his flaws, or used to love him, and no longer support his music. By the time he took the stage, The Q was nearly full - a sign that this talented singer/dancer/actor still has a strong fan base in Ohio".

Ross Raihala of the St. Paul Pioneer Press stated: "The sparse, wide-open stage served as a screen and showed various graphics timed to the beats and sometimes footage from Brown's videos, like the racy “Privacy.” Given all the flashing lights and booming bass, though, Brown did sometimes seem to get lost at his own party. There were some fun moments for sure, particularly “Time for Love” and “Ayo”. Chris Riemenschneider (Star Tribune) shared the thoughts on the concert in Saint Paul. He says: "Brown's performance was still far from comeback-level. His voice has plenty of velvety power left in it, as he proved early on in a dramatic 'Deuces,' and he still shows traces of Michael Jackson in his stylish dance moves, which he reiterated in the show finale, 'Party'. [...] Brown stopped and started a lot for outfit changes, and the momentum never really got going.".

For the show in Lincoln, L. Keny Wolgamott of the Lincoln Journal Star wrote: "They put on a high energy show with some good tricks -- starting with Brown's entrance from underneath the video cube above the center of the stage, flipping around on some wires before he hit the stage".

== Opening acts ==
- O.T. Genasis
- Kap G
- Casanova
- Ayo & Teo (select dates)

== Support acts ==
- D.C. Young Fly
- Fabolous

== Setlist ==
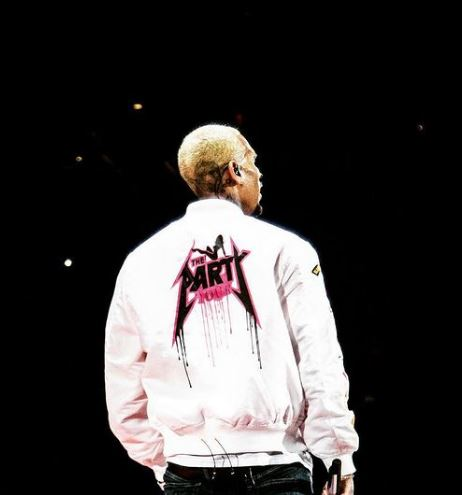
Brown during one of the dates, wearing a Black Pyramid jacket of the tour

The following setlist was obtained from the concert held on March 31, 2017, at the Royal Farms Arena in Baltimore, Maryland. It does not represent every concert for the duration of the tour.

1. "Wrist"
2. "Poppin'"
3. "Love More"
4. "Yo (Excuse Me Miss)"
5. "Deuces"
6. "Picture Me Rollin'"
7. "Privacy"
8. "She Wildin'" (performed with Fabolous)
9. "Liquor"
10. "Drunk Texting"
11. "Grass Ain't Greener"
12. "Take You Down"
13. "Make Love"
14. "Back to Sleep"
15. "Wishing"
16. "Do You Mind"
17. "Time for Love"
18. "Show Me" / "Post to Be" / Ayo
19. "Loyal"

Encore

20. "Kriss Kross"
21. "Party"

== Tour dates ==
Date	City	Country	Venue
North America
March 31, 2017	Baltimore	United States	Royal Farms Arena
April 1, 2017	Newark	United States	Prudential Center
April 2, 2017	Boston	United States	TD Garden
April 4, 2017	Charlotte	United States	Spectrum Center
April 6, 2017	Cleveland	United States	Quicken Loans Arena
April 7, 2017	Auburn Hills	United States	The Palace of Auburn Hills
April 9, 2017	Saint Paul	United States	Xcel Energy Center
April 10, 2017	Lincoln	United States	Pinnacle Bank Arena
April 11, 2017	Kansas City	United States	Sprint Center
April 13, 2017	New Orleans	United States	Smoothie King Center
April 15, 2017	Miami	United States	American Airlines Arena
April 16, 2017	Tampa	United States	Amalie Arena
April 18, 2017	Jacksonville	United States	Jacksonville Veterans Memorial Arena
April 20, 2017	Hampton	United States	Hampton Coliseum
April 21, 2017	Washington, D.C.	United States	Verizon Center
April 22, 2017	Philadelphia	United States	Wells Fargo Center
April 24, 2017	Brooklyn	United States	Barclays Center
April 28, 2017	Rosemont	United States	Allstate Arena
April 29, 2017	Columbus	United States	Value City Arena
April 30, 2017	Nashville	United States	Bridgestone Arena
May 2, 2017	Atlanta	United States	Philips Arena
May 4, 2017	Houston	United States	Toyota Center
May 6, 2017	Dallas	United States	American Airlines Center
May 8, 2017	Denver	United States	Pepsi Center
May 10, 2017	Portland	United States	Moda Center
May 11, 2017	Seattle	United States	KeyArena
May 13, 2017	Sacramento	United States	Golden 1 Center
May 15, 2017	Phoenix	United States	Talking Stick Resort Arena
May 16, 2017	Anaheim	United States	Honda Center
May 18, 2017	San Jose	United States	SAP Center
May 19, 2017	San Diego	United States	Viejas Arena
May 20, 2017	Las Vegas	United States	MGM Grand Garden Arena
May 23, 2017	Inglewood	United States	The Forum

=== Box office score data ===
Venue	City	Tickets sold / Available	Gross revenue
Prudential Center	Newark	10,551 / 13,625 (77%)	$845,621
TD Garden	Boston	9,417 / 16,526 (57%)	$711,762
Spectrum Center	Charlotte	7,023 / 12,718 (55%)	$429,798
Quicken Loans Arena	Cleveland	7,145 / 12,002 (60%)	$401,634
The Palace of Auburn Hills	Auburn Hills	6,746 / 18,370 (37%)	$550,150
Xcel Energy Center	Saint Paul	6,353 / 18,133 (35%)	$364,088
Pinnacle Bank Arena	Lincoln	5,514 / 10,047 (55%)	$324,355
Sprint Center	Kansas City	6,276 / 11,486 (55%)	$336,665
Smoothie King Center	New Orleans	6,211 / 11,254 (55%)	$367,051
American Airlines Arena	Miami	8,245 / 15,013 (55%)	$549,277
Amalie Arena	Tampa	6,298 / 17,132 (37%)	$387,623
Jacksonville Veterans Memorial Arena	Jacksonville	5,126 / 11,373 (45%)	$300,970
Hampton Coliseum	Hampton	6,712 / 9,399 (71%)	$414,774
Verizon Center	Washington, D.C.	8,980 / 15,804 (57%)	$799,197
Wells Fargo Center	Philadelphia	7,855 / 19,186 (41%)	$509,876
Barclays Center	New York City	15,728 / 15,728 (100%)	$1,393,129
Allstate Arena	Rosemont	9,035 / 16,719 (54%)	$638,920
Value City Arena	Columbus	8,314 / 11,910 (70%)	$570,429
Bridgestone Arena	Nashville	8,041 / 10,851 (74%)	$404,803
Philips Arena	Atlanta	10,169 / 11,415 (89%)	$744,422
Toyota Center	Houston	7,488 / 9,318 (80%)	$539,247
American Airlines Center	Dallas	12,858 / 13,338 (96%)	$739,537
Pepsi Center	Denver	6,929 / 10,770 (64%)	$395,783
Moda Center	Portland	8,342 / 10,955 (76%)	$470,330
KeyArena	Seattle	8,552 / 12,192 (70%)	$565,790
Golden 1 Center	Sacramento	12,846 / 16,302 (79%)	$793,542
Talking Stick Resort Arena	Phoenix	8,776 / 11,578 (76%)	$483,537
Honda Center	Anaheim	8,142 / 15,034 (54%)	$588,587
SAP Center	San Jose	11,090 / 17,369 (64%)	$598,685
Viejas Arena	San Diego	7,001 / 12,210 (57%)	$452,494
MGM Grand Garden Arena	Las Vegas	8,138 / 9,823 (83%)	$626,473
The Forum	Inglewood	11,584 / 14,545 (80%)	$912,829
TOTAL		271,485 / 432,125 (63%)	$18,211,378
