= Slime & B =

- Official cover

Mixtape by Chris Brown and Young Thug
- Released: May 5, 2020
- Recorded: April 2020
- Studio: CBE (Tarzana)
- Genres: Trap; R&B
- Length: 43:12
- Labels: CBE; RCA
- Producers: A1; Ambezza; G Styles on the Track; Guitar Boy; Joseph L'etranger; KanielTheOne; MjNichols; Murda Beatz; Murphy Kid; Musik MajorX; OG Parker; Patrizio Pigliapoco; Rippa on the Beat; Romano; Sean Momberger; T-Minus; Tariq Beats; The Audibles; Turbo; Wheezy; Xayy; Z3N

Alternative cover
- Original cover

Chris Brown chronology
Indigo (2019)	Slime & B (2020)	Breezy (2022)

Young Thug chronology
So Much Fun (2019)	Slime & B (2020)	Slime Language 2 (2021)

Singles from Slime & B
- 1. "Go Crazy" Released: May 19, 2020; 2. "Say You Love Me" Released: September 29, 2020

Slime & B is a collaborative commercial mixtape by American singer Chris Brown and American rapper Young Thug. It was released on May 5, 2020, by Chris Brown Entertainment, LLC, under exclusive license to RCA. The mixtape includes production from Murda Beatz, Turbo, Wheezy, A1, OG Parker and more, along with guest appearances from Gunna, Future, Too $hort, E-40 and Lil Duke, among others.

"Go Crazy" was released as the mixtape's lead single, and became Brown's seventh top-five song as a lead artist, as well Young Thug's highest lead artist charting song in the US, peaking at number 3 on the Billboard Hot 100 and spending more than one full year on the chart.

== Background and recording ==
Previously, Brown and Young Thug collaborated on the official remix of Brown's song "Wrist", contained in OHB and Brown's collaborative mixtape Before the Trap: Nights in Tarzana (2016), on the free-released track "Dat Night", also featuring Trey Songz, and on "High End", a promotional single from Brown's eighth studio album Heartbreak on a Full Moon (2017), also featuring Future.

The mixtape was recorded at Brown's Tarzana house during the very first stages of COVID-19 pandemic. The mixtape was firstly announced on April 6, 2020, by Brown on his Instagram account. In an interview with Revolt, mixing engineer Patrizio Pigliapoco talked about the making of Slime & B: "It was some days of 30-40 people in Chris' house. Young Thug's crew is massive. It wouldn't be a party, but it would be a kickback while we made the mixtape". On April 28, 2020, the title and release date set for Brown's 31st birthday were announced. Young Thug wrote on Instagram that the mixtape was "something special" for fans amid the coronavirus pandemic. According to Pitchfork, the title "implies a meeting of the minds and a marrying of their styles".

== Critical reception ==
Professional ratings
Review scores
Source	Rating
HipHopDX	4.5/5 stars
Pitchfork	5.0/10

The mixtape received a positive response from the general public. Kenan Draughorne of HipHopDX praised Slime & B, commenting that both artists "pair with each other beautifully, creating their best collaborative tape to date", defining it a "fun-filled amusement park from start to finish, bursting with color from both the acclaimed vocalists and the production beneath them". Draughorne called "Go Crazy" the mixtape's best song. Vulture argued that Slime & B "saw Thug gracing the slickest production he touched since his chart-topping Camila Cabello collaboration “Havana.”" HotNewHipHop commented that "Slime & B feels closer to an album than a mixtape". Pitchfork described the duo's collaboration as a "strange pop-culture artifact".

=== Awards and nominations ===
Awards and nominations for Slime & B
Year	Ceremony	Category	Result	Ref.
2020	Soul Train Music Awards	Album of the Year	Nominated	
2021	Billboard Music Awards	Top R&B Album	Nominated	

== Commercial performance ==
Slime & B made its debut on the charts after being initially released for free on SoundCloud and having just three days of availability on digital retailers and streaming platforms. It debuted at number 55 on the US Billboard 200, earning 19,000 album-equivalent units. In its second chart week, the album jumped at number 24 on Billboard 200, earning 20,000 album-equivalent units.

The mixtape's lead single "Go Crazy", was commercially successful worldwide. It reached the third position on the Billboard Hot 100, and spent more than a year on the chart. "Go Crazy" has emerged as Brown's biggest radio hit since 2008 and marks his seventh top-five song as a lead artist. Additionally, it stands as Young Thug's highest-charting single as a lead artist in the US.

== Track listing ==
Credits adapted from Tidal.

No.	Title	Writer(s)	Producer(s)	Length
1.	"Say You Love Me"	Christopher Brown; Jeffery Williams; Joshua Parker; Shane Lindstrom; Jeremy McIntyre	OG Parker; Murda Beatz; Joseph L'Étranger	2:52
2.	"Go Crazy"	Brown; J. Williams; Wayne Samuels; Omari Akinlolu; Zakaria Kharbouch; Turrell Sims; Trè Samuels; Soraya Benjelloun; Phillip Price; Patrizio Pigliapoco; Orville Hall; Said Aznou; Johnny Kelvin; Dounia Aznou; Kaniel Castañeda; Cameron Murphy	Yume; KanielTheOne; Murphy Kid	2:56
3.	"Trap Back" (featuring Major Nine)	Brown; J. Williams; Chad Thomas; Ricardo Toussaint; Maxwell Nichols	Rippa on the Beat; MjNichols; Major Nine	4:16
4.	"I Got Time" (featuring Shad da God)	Brown; J. Williams; Rashad Battle; Pigliapoco; Floyd Bentley III; Julian Taylor; Altariq Crapps	A1; Xayy; Tariq Beats^{[b]}	3:23
5.	"She Bumped Her Head" (featuring Gunna)	Brown; J. Williams; Sergio Kitchens; Nija Charles; Chandler Durham; Wesley Jones	Turbo; Jet^{[b]}	4:00
6.	"Big Slimes" (featuring Gunna and Lil Duke)	Brown; J. Williams; Kitchens; Arnold Martinez; Durham; Eliel Afari-Brown; Patrick Bodi; Casey Moon	Turbo; Eli Brown^{[b]}; 254Bodi^{[b]}; Moon^{[c]}	5:26
7.	"I Ain't Tryin'"	Brown; J. Williams; Charles; Tyler Williams	T-Minus	3:53
8.	"Animal"	Brown; J. Williams; Frederic Brewer; Pigliapoco; James Douglas; Donny Flores; Frederic Brewer; Aleicia Gibson; Juan Guerrieri-Maril	Z3N	3:26
9.	"City Girls"	Brown; J. Williams; Miles McCollum; Jatavia Johnson; Isaac Bynum; Steven Tolson; Jimmy Giannos; Dominic Jordan	The Audibles	3:50
10.	"Stolen"	Brown; J. Williams; Sheldon Body, Jr.; Sean McMillion; Ralph Jeanty; Jamal Gaines; Pigliapoco; Golden Styles; Terence Williams; Patrick Hayes	G Styles on the Track; Romano; Guitar Boy^{[a]}	3:49
11.	"Undrunk" (performed by Chris Brown featuring Too Short and E-40)	Brown; Todd Shaw; Earl Stevens; Dameion Roy, Jr.; Bobby Turner, Jr.; Bentley; Yann Espinosa; Pigliapoco; Uforo Ebong	A1; Yaya; Pigliapoco; Bongo	3:10
12.	"No Such Thing" (performed by Chris Brown featuring HoodyBaby)	Brown; Akinlolu; Norman Cook; Pigliapoco; Jabreh Shaw; Crapps; Quinton Cook; Timothy Wells, Jr.	Tariq Beats; Musik MajorX	1:41
13.	"Help Me Breathe" (performed by Young Thug featuring Future)	J. Williams; Nayvadius Wilburn; Kevin Wales; Pigliapoco; Steven Jordan; Daron Jones; Brown; Sean Momberger; Wesley Glass; Mathias Liyew	Momberger; Wheezy; Ambezza	3:50
Total length:				46:36

Notes

- ^{^[a]} signifies a co-producer
- ^{^[b]} signifies an uncredited co-producer
- ^{^[c]} signifies an uncredited additional producer
- "Help Me Breathe" originally appeared in the Datpiff and SoundCloud release, however, was added to streaming services 3 days later.

Sample credits

- "Go Crazy" contains a portion of the composition "Drag Rap (Triggerman)", written by Orville Hall, and Phillip Price, as performed by The Showboys.

== Charts ==
=== Weekly charts ===
Weekly chart performance for Slime & B
Chart (2020)	Peak position
Australian Albums (ARIA)	29
Australian Hip Hop/R&B Albums (ARIA)	7
Belgian Albums (Ultratop Flanders)	156
Belgian Albums (Ultratop Wallonia)	161
Canadian Albums (Billboard)	46
Dutch Albums (Album Top 100)	38
French Albums (SNEP)	110
New Zealand Albums (RMNZ)	37
Swiss Albums (Schweizer Hitparade)	51
UK Albums (Official Charts)	51
UK R&B Albums (Official Charts)	12
US Billboard 200	24
US Top R&B/Hip-Hop Albums (Billboard)	15

=== Year-end charts ===
2020 year-end chart performance for Slime & B
Chart (2020)	Position
US Billboard 200	155
US Top R&B/Hip-Hop Albums (Billboard)	61

== Certifications ==
Certifications for Slime & B
Region	Certification	Certified units/sales
New Zealand (RMNZ)	Platinum	15,000^{‡}
^{‡} Sales+streaming figures based on certification alone.
