= Go Crazy (Chris Brown and Young Thug song) =

2020 single by Chris Brown and Young Thug

Single by Chris Brown and Young Thug

from the album Slime & B
- Released: May 19, 2020
- Recorded: April 2020
- Studio: CBE (Tarzana)
- Genre: R&B; trap
- Length: 2:56
- Label: CBE; RCA
- Songwriters: Christopher Brown; Jeffery Williams; Cameron Devaun Murphy; Dounia Aznou; Johnny Kelvin; Kaniel Castaneda; Said Aznou; Omari Akinlolu; Orville Hall; Patrizio Pigliapoco; Phillip Price; Soraya Benjelloun; Tre Samuels; Turrell Sims; Wayne Samuels
- Lyricists: Christopher Brown; Jeffery Williams; Tre Samuels; Omari Akinlolu
- Producers: Murphy Kid; KanielTheOne

Chris Brown singles chronology
"Wake Up Dead" (2020)	"Go Crazy" (2020)	"Put In Work" (2020)

Young Thug singles chronology
"Quarantine Clean" (2020)	"Go Crazy" (2020)	"Yacht Club" (2020)

Music video
- "Go Crazy" on YouTube

"Go Crazy" is a song by American singer Chris Brown and American rapper Young Thug, from their collaborative mixtape Slime & B, released on May 5, 2020. After it became the only charting song from the mixtape, it was officially released as a single on May 19, 2020. The song is a trap-infused R&B record, with production that samples the Showboys's 1986 single "Drag Rap", for which the Showboys are credited as writers. The official remix of the song was released on February 19, 2021, and features fellow American rappers Future, Lil Durk, and Latto.

"Go Crazy" garnered critical acclaim from music critics, who complimented its production and the duo's delivery, being considered by some as the mixtape's best song. Some critics compared the song to early 2010s music, as well as Brown's previous single "Heat" (2019), for its similar musical direction. The song received great success, becoming Brown's biggest radio hit since 2008, dominating on both pop and hip hop radio, breaking the record for most weeks at number one on the R&B/Hip-Hop Airplay chart, surpassing "No Guidance", by Brown (ft. Drake). The song peaked at number three on the Billboard Hot 100 in 2021, earning Brown his seventh top-five song as a lead artist, as well Young Thug's highest lead artist charting song in the US.

A music video, shot in Brown's California mansion, was released on July 17, 2020, and displays a big house party, with a supernatural atmosphere full of colorful thunders, fireworks, pools and girls. The storyline of the videoclip continues in the music video of the following single from the mixtape, "Say You Love Me". "Go Crazy" received various accolades, including one iHeartRadio Music Award and three Soul Train Music Awards, including Song of the Year.

== Background and composition ==
Brown and Thug previously collaborated on the official remix of Brown's song "Wrist", contained in OHB and Brown's collaborative mixtape Before the Trap: Nights in Tarzana, on the free-released track "Dat Night", and on "High End", a promotional single from Brown's eighth studio album Heartbreak on a Full Moon. The track was recorded at Brown's house during the very first stages of COVID-19 pandemic, during the sessions for the duo's collaborative mixtape Slime & B. The track was written by both Brown and Young Thug, along with singer Tre Samuels and rapper HoodyBaby, the latter was also the one who executive produced their collaborative mixtape along with rapper Lil Duke. The production of the song was handled by Murphy Kid and KanielTheOne.

"Go Crazy" first appeared as track 2 on Brown's and Thug's collaborative mixtape Slime & B on May 5, 2020. The song performed particularly well on streaming services and was subsequently sent to radio as a single. Two weeks later, Brown and his daughter Royalty started a dance challenge for the song called "#GoCrazyChallenge". The challenge sees a person dancing on the sidewalk outside a slow moving car. According to Brown, the challenge was inspired by influencer Mufasa.

"Go Crazy" is a harmonic uptempo, trap-infused, R&B song. Its production samples "Drag Rap" (1986) by the Showboys, a song that was also sampled by Brown for his track "Emerald" contained in his ninth studio album Indigo. Lyrically, it sees Brown and Thug guarantee to a debaucherous girl, whose appearance looks shy, their fun and expensive lifestyle. The song is in the key of C minor with a tempo of 94 BPM with a time signature of 4/4 in common time.

== Critical reception ==
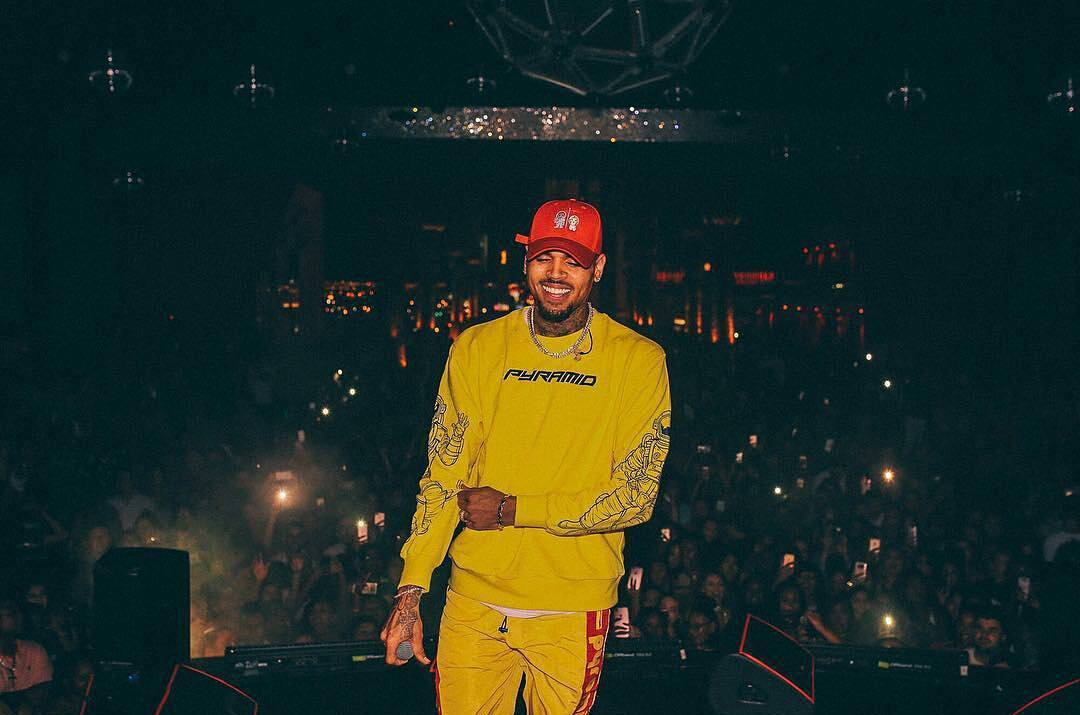
Brown's performance on the track was praised by critics.

"Go Crazy" obtained critical acclaim, with various critics naming it as a standout from Slime & B, particularly commending Brown for his "perfectly harmonized" hook. XXL listed it among the best hip hop songs of the year. Carl Lamare of Billboard said that the song "is mandatorily catchy. CB has very few misses in his catalog when it comes to penning sing-songy hooks, and he accomplished that same mission when whipping up 'Go Crazy'. Thug plays the perfect partner, too, matching his melodic intensity with an action-packed verse of his own".

Complex named it the 24th best song of 2020, with the magazine's Jessica McKinney calling it "an underrated banger", opining that the "late-night record [...] will likely make it to summer playlists in the years to come". Kenan Draughorne of HipHopDX called "Go Crazy" "the album's best song, cleverly sampling The Showboys' iconic 'Drag Rap' to complement the free-ranging sonics". HipHopDX also named it one of the best R&B songs of 2020, writing: "'Go Crazy' is 2010s kid's dream song. From Breezy's signature sweet falsetto coupled with Thugger's squeaking slime language, to the sample of The Show Boys' 'Drag Rap' (also found in T.I. and Lil Wayne's 'Ball'), 'Go Crazy' is a time capsule track catering to the strengths of two of the most renowned hitmakers of the last decade".

== Music video ==
The official video was released on July 17, 2020. It was directed by Brown, Mat Fuller and production company Paradise City Entertainment. It was shot at Brown's Southern California home, where the song was also recorded, during the first COVID-19 quarantine. Diddy's sons Justin and Christian make "high-energy" cameos in the visual, while Gunna also makes an appearance. HipHopDX's Marisa Mendez defined the videoclip as "colorful", noting, as is signature to Brown, that the video comes complete with "dope" choreography.

=== Synopsis ===
The clip shows Brown and Thug waking up at a big, wild house party, as the attendees put their lavish lifestyles on display. It continues showcasing numerous dance choreographies, with the artists ending up chasing two mysterious girls who, at the end of the clip, rarefy themselves in colored clouds, inviting Brown and Thug to enter, and the duo, being intrigued, follows them. Throughout the video there are numerous features that make the party's atmosphere look supernatural, including colorful thunders and lots of large fireworks. The story of the video clip continues in the music video of the following single from the mixtape, "Say You Love Me".

== Chart performance ==
"Go Crazy" reached number five on the US Billboard Hot 100 chart on the week of January 16, 2021. This was the lengthiest ascent to the top five (35 weeks) for a song by lead males in the Hot 100's 62-year history, and third overall behind Gabby Barrett's "I Hope", featuring Charlie Puth (45 weeks, 2020), and Imagine Dragons' "Radioactive" (42 weeks, 2012–2013). It marked Brown's 16th top ten song and Young Thug's fourth top ten on the chart. The track later peaked at number three on the chart in March 2021. The song ended up spending more than one full year on the chart, becoming both artists's first song to do so. On the Hot R&B/Hip Hop Songs chart, it became Brown's sixth number-one in its 32nd week in December 2020, tying for the third-longest ascent to the top since the chart's inception. The song became Brown's biggest radio hit since 2008's "Forever", reaching number one on the all-genre Radio Songs chart where it stayed atop for over six consecutive weeks. It peaked at number one on the US Rhythmic Songs, making it Brown's twelfth number one song on the chart, and Thug's third number one song. It later broke the record for the longest stay in the top 10 of the Rhythmic chart, after it logged a 32nd week on the chart dated February 6, 2021. The song topped the R&B/Hip-Hop Airplay chart as well, on the week of August 22, 2020, with 22.6 million in audience in the week ending August 16, making it Brown's ninth number-one song on the chart, and Young Thug's fourth number-one. It also became Brown's 50th top 10 hit on the chart. In the United Kingdom, the song peaked at number ten on the UK Singles Chart. It served as Brown's 18th top ten song and Thug's third top ten on the chart

== Accolades ==
Awards and nominations for "Go Crazy"
Year	Awards	Category	Result
2020	Soul Train Music Awards	Song of the Year	Won
2020	Soul Train Music Awards	Video of the Year	Nominated
2020	Soul Train Music Awards	Best Collaboration	Won
2020	Soul Train Music Awards	Best Dance Performance	Won
2020	Soul Train Music Awards	The Ashford & Simpson Songwriter's Award	Nominated
2021	BET Awards	Video of the Year	Nominated
2021	BET Awards	Viewer's Choice Award	Nominated
2021	Billboard Music Awards	Top R&B Song	Nominated
2021	Billboard Music Awards	Top Collaboration	Nominated
2021	Billboard Music Awards	Top Hot 100 Song	Nominated
2021	Billboard Music Awards	Top Radio Song	Nominated
2021	iHeartRadio Music Awards	R&B Song of the Year	Won
2021	iHeartRadio Music Awards	Best Collaboration	Nominated
2021	American Music Awards	Favorite Soul/R&B Song	Nominated
2021	American Music Awards	Collaboration of the Year	Nominated
2021	BET Hip Hop Awards	Best Hip Hop Video	Nominated
2021	MTV Video Music Awards	Best R&B	Nominated

== Live performances ==
The song was performed for the first time by Brown more than one year following its release, on September 24, 2021, at Staples Center, in Los Angeles, during an appearance for Lil Baby's Back Outside Tour. The singer then performed "Go Crazy" in London, during an appearance for Wizkid's Made in Lagos tour, marking his first performance in the UK in 11 years, following the revocation of his ban from entering the country implemented in 2010.

== Track listing ==
- Digital download and stream
1. "Go Crazy" – 2:59
- Digital download and stream
1. "Go Crazy" (Remix) (featuring Future, Lil Durk, and Latto) – 3:49

== Personnel ==
Credits adapted from Tidal.

- Chris Brown – lead artist, songwriting, composition
- Young Thug – lead artist, songwriting, composition
- Cameron Devaun Murphy – composition, production, instruments
- Kaniel Castaneda – composition, production, instruments
- Orville Hall – songwriting, composition
- Patrizio Pigliapoco – composition, mixing engineering, recording engineering
- Phillip Price – songwriting, composition
- Tre Samuels – songwriting, composition
- Turrell Sims – songwriting, composition
- Mike Tucci – master engineering
- A. "Bainz" Bains – mixing engineering, recording engineering
- Aresh Banaji – mixing engineering

== Charts ==
=== Weekly charts ===
Weekly chart performance for "Go Crazy"
Chart (2020–2022)	Peak position
Australia (ARIA)	9
Belgium (Ultratip Bubbling Under Flanders)	25
Canada Hot 100 (Billboard)	41
Global 200 (Billboard)	26
Greece (IFPI)	41
Ireland (IRMA)	26
Netherlands (Dutch Top 40 Tipparade)	13
Netherlands (Single Top 100)	47
New Zealand (Recorded Music NZ)	2
Portugal (AFP)	50
Romania (Airplay 100)	77
Scotland Singles (OCC)	37
Singapore (RIAS)	26
Suriname (Nationale Top 40)	1
Sweden Heatseeker (Sverigetopplistan)	1
Switzerland (Schweizer Hitparade)	59
UK Singles (OCC)	10
UK Hip Hop/R&B (OCC)	6
US Billboard Hot 100	3
US Adult Contemporary (Billboard)	20
US Adult R&B Songs (Billboard)	1
US Adult Pop Airplay (Billboard)	25
US Dance/Mix Show Airplay (Billboard)	16
US Hot R&B/Hip-Hop Songs (Billboard)	1
US Pop Airplay (Billboard)	3
US R&B/Hip-Hop Airplay (Billboard)	1
US Rhythmic Airplay (Billboard)	1
US Rolling Stone Top 100	11

=== Year-end charts ===
2020 year-end chart performance for "Go Crazy"
Chart (2020)	Position
Australia (ARIA)	46
New Zealand (Recorded Music NZ)	18
UK Singles (OCC)	62
US Billboard Hot 100	39
US Hot R&B/Hip-Hop Songs (Billboard)	15
US Rhythmic (Billboard)	5

2021 year-end chart performance for "Go Crazy"
Chart (2021)	Position
Global 200 (Billboard)	148
US Billboard Hot 100	19
US Hot R&B/Hip-Hop Songs (Billboard)	5
US Mainstream Top 40 (Billboard)	15
US Rhythmic (Billboard)	4

== Certifications ==
Certifications for "Go Crazy"
Region	Certification	Certified units/sales
Australia (ARIA)	2× Platinum	140,000^{‡}
Canada (Music Canada)	2× Platinum	160,000^{‡}
Denmark (IFPI Danmark)	Platinum	90,000^{‡}
France (SNEP)	Gold	100,000^{‡}
Mexico (AMPROFON)	Gold	30,000^{‡}
New Zealand (RMNZ)	6× Platinum	180,000^{‡}
Portugal (AFP)	Platinum	10,000^{‡}
Switzerland (IFPI Switzerland)	Gold	10,000^{‡}
United Kingdom (BPI)	2× Platinum	1,200,000^{‡}
United States (RIAA)	6× Platinum	6,000,000^{‡}
^{‡} Sales+streaming figures based on certification alone.

== Remix ==
"Go Crazy (Remix)"

Single by Chris Brown & Young Thug featuring Future, Lil Durk, and Latto
- Released: February 19, 2021
- Genre: R&B; trap
- Length: 3:47
- Label: CBE; RCA
- Songwriters: Christopher Brown; Jeffery Williams; Nayvadius Wilburn; Durk Banks; Alyssa Stephens; Cameron Devaun Murphy; Dounia Aznou; Johnny Kelvin; Kaniel Castaneda; Said Aznou; Omari Akinlolu; Orville Hall; Patrizio Pigliapoco; Phillip Price; Soraya Benjelloun; Tre Samuels; Turrell Sims; Wayne Samuels
- Producers: Murphy Kid; KanielTheOne

Chris Brown singles chronology
"Guilty" / "Rolls Royce Umbrella" (2021)	"Go Crazy (Remix)" / "Feels" (2021)	"Baby" (2021)

Young Thug singles chronology
"That Go!" (2021)	"Go Crazy (Remix)" (2021)	"Who Is You" (2021)

Future singles chronology
"Blow Some Down" (2021)	"Go Crazy (Remix)" (2021)	"Hard for the Next" (2021)

Lil Durk singles chronology
"Leave Some Day (Remix)" (2021)	"Go Crazy (Remix)" / "No More Parties (Remix)" (2021)	"Jump" (2021)

Mulatto singles chronology
"Nasty" (2021)	"Go Crazy (Remix)" (2021)	"Freaky as Me" (2021)

Music video
- "Go Crazy (Remix)" on YouTube

The official remix was released on February 19, 2021, and features fellow American rappers Future, Lil Durk, and Latto (then known as Mulatto). It was announced by Brown and Thug on February 16, 2021, along with a cartoon cover art featuring all five artists. The remix's theme was centered around "bringing back the summer tune" that makes one forget about 2020. Much like the original, it finds the rappers harmonizing about love and sex, with Durk and Future delivering "melodic" verses, with the "relaxed" raps of Latto in between them. Young Thug is credited on the remix, however, only his ad-libs are retained while both his and Brown's verses are omitted.

=== Critical reception ===
Andrew Unterberger of Billboard said about the remix, "Honestly, no matter who's delivering the verses to this song, memory of them vanishes almost completely by the time that massive chorus rolls around again. The remix is fine, and some programmers will undoubtedly be grateful for the fresh alternative, but ultimately I doubt its impact will be lasting".

=== Charts ===
Chart performance for "Go Crazy" (Remix)
Chart (2021)	Peak position
New Zealand Hot Singles (RMNZ)	27

== Release history ==
Region	Date	Format	Label	Edition	Ref.
Various	May 5, 2020	Digital download; streaming	Chris Brown Entertainment; RCA	Standard	
United States	May 19, 2020	Rhythmic contemporary	Chris Brown Entertainment; RCA	Standard	
United States	October 6, 2020	Urban adult contemporary	Chris Brown Entertainment; RCA	Standard	
Various	February 19, 2021	Digital download; streaming	Chris Brown Entertainment; RCA	Remix	
