= Christopher Dotson =

American singer-songwriter

Prince Chrishan
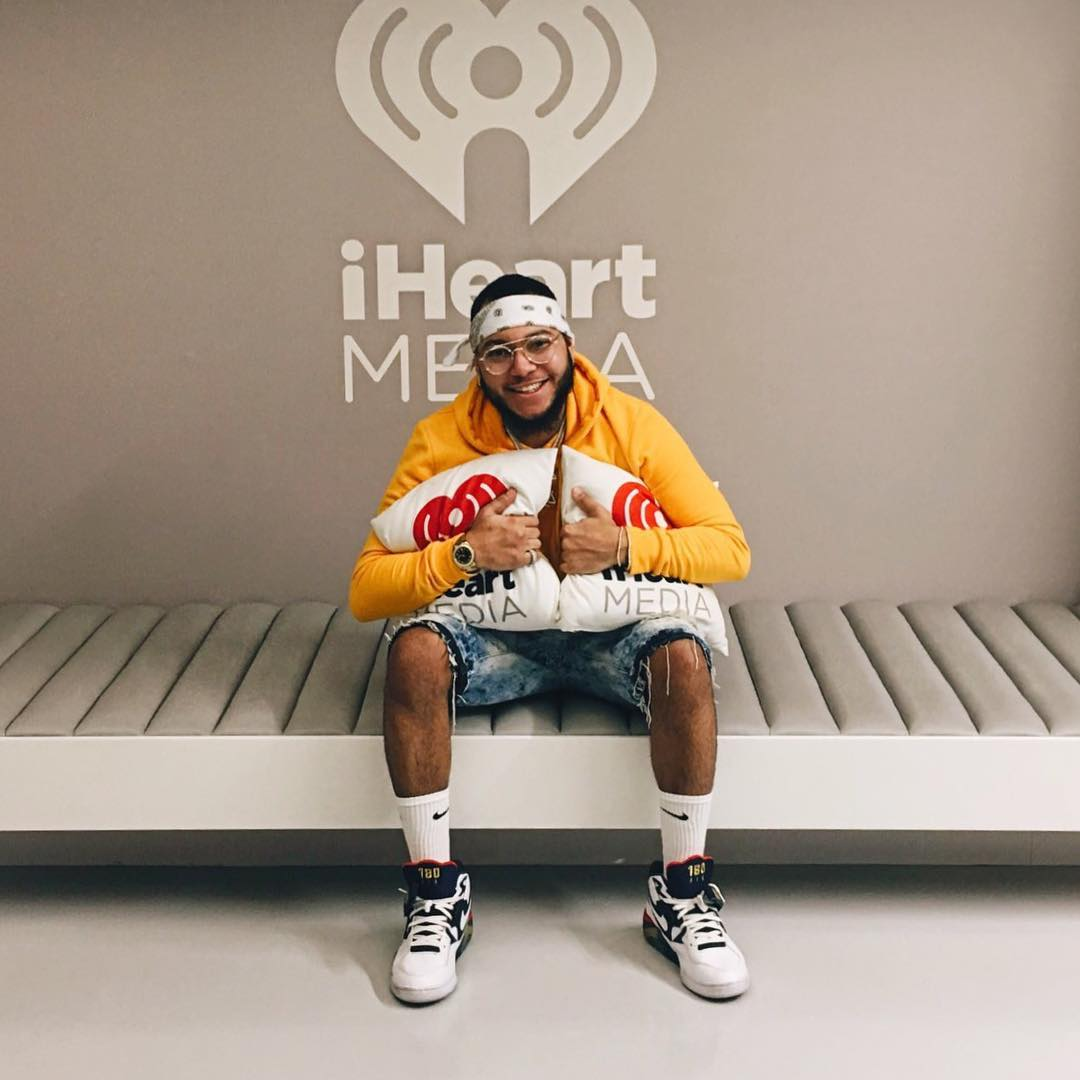
- Dotson at iHeartMedia in 2017

Background information
- Also known as: Chrishan; Prince Chrishan
- Born: Christopher Chrishan Dotson; Toledo, Ohio, U.S.
- Origin: Minneapolis, Minnesota, U.S.
- Genres: R&B; hip hop; trap
- Occupations: Singer; songwriter; record producer
- Years active: 2008–present
- Labels: Right Now Sound; Warner/Chappell

Christopher Chrishan Dotson, better known by his stage name Prince Chrishan (or simply Chrishan), is an American singer, songwriter, and record producer. He is known for his songwriting and production work for fellow R&B singer Chris Brown, having been credited on each of his studio albums since Royalty in 2015. For other artists, he has co-written or produced the Billboard Hot 100-top 40 songs "Look Back at It" by A Boogie wit da Hoodie and "Dangerous" by Meek Mill. Prior, he first gained recognition for his work on Adrian Marcel's 2014 single "2AM", which received gold certification by the Recording Industry Association of America (RIAA).

== Early life ==
Chrishan was born in Toledo, Ohio and grew up in Minneapolis, Minnesota. He attended High School for Recording Arts in St. Paul, Minnesota.

== Personal life ==
Chrishan is the nephew of singer Lyfe Jennings. Chrishan's brother was murdered in February 2017 in Toledo, Ohio.

== Discography ==
Year	Album
2009	Night & Day
2009	I Am: Chrishan the Prince
2010	Man of the Year
2011	Heart of a Lion
2011	Man of the Year 2
2012	Money & Liqour
2012	Forever
2013	Man of the Year 3
2015	TieDye, Pt. 1
2019	Ultraviolet
2022	TieDye, Pt. 2

== Production discography ==
Year	Title	Artist	Album
2012	"Wings"	Little Mix	DNA
2012	"Live It Up" (Featuring Mann)	Kid Ink	Daydreamer
2012	"Go To Waste"	Kevin McCall	—N/a
2012	"Hoes in This House" (Featuring Problem)	Kevin McCall	—N/a
2012	"Elevator"	Daichi Miura	The Entertainer
2014	"All Time"	Chief Keef	Bang, Pt. 2
2014	"Stereo"	W-inds.	Timeless
2014	"Alleyoop"	B. Smyth	—N/a
2014	"2AM"	Adrian Marcel	—N/a
2014	"Ride It"	Eric Bellinger	The Rebirth
2014	"Homicide"	Kevin Gates	By Any Means
2014	"Holding Aces"	Alexandra Stan	Unlocked
2014	"Little Lies"	Alexandra Stan	Unlocked
2015	"Wish I Never"	Joelle Hadjia	—N/a
2015	"Ain't Bout To Do" (Featuring French Montana)	Diggy Simmons	Out of This World
2015	"Papi" (Featuring Baby Bash and Baeza)	Jonn Hart	—N/a
2015	"This Work" (Featuring Chrishan)	O.T. Genasis	Rhythm & Bricks
2015	"Buzzin'" Featuring The Game and YG	Lyrica Anderson	Hello
2015	"Material Things" (Featuring Wiz Khalifa)	Lyrica Anderson	Hello
2015	"Confidence" (Featuring Chrishan)	King Los	GodMoneyWar
2015	"Wrist" Featuring Solo Lucci	Chris Brown	Royalty
2015	"Brand New"	Austin Mahone	This Is Not The Album
2016	"Something New" (Featuring Chris Brown)	Zendaya	—N/a
2016	"WAM" (Featuring Wale and E-40)	Adrian Marcel	—N/a
2016	"Whippin'" Featuring Section Boyz and Migos	Chris Brown	Before the Trap: Nights in Tarzana
2016	"I Need Love" (Featuring Hoody Baby and Young Blacc)	Chris Brown	Before the Trap: Nights in Tarzana
2016	"Party Next Door" (Featuring Young Blacc)	Chris Brown	Before the Trap: Nights in Tarzana
2016	"Actin' Like This" (Featuring Dee Cosey)	Chris Brown	Before the Trap: Nights in Tarzana
2016	"Wrist (Remix)" (Featuring Young Thug and Young Jeezy)	Chris Brown	Before the Trap: Nights in Tarzana
2016	"Substance"	Chris Brown	Before the Trap: Nights in Tarzana
2016	"Grass Ain't Greener"	Chris Brown	—N/a
2016	"The World Is Dope"	The Lonely Island	Popstar
2016	"Twisted"	Kalin White	Chapter 21
2016	"Savage"	Kalin White	Chapter 21
2016	"Favorite Thing About You"	Kalin White	Chapter 21
2016	"Pull Up (Aye)"	Kalin White	Chapter 21
2016	"Take Care"	Kalin White	Chapter 21
2016	"Teams"	Kalin White	Chapter 21
2016	"Chapter 21"	Kalin White	Chapter 21
2016	"Kriss Kross"	Chris Brown	Attack The Block
2016	"Party"	Chris Brown	—N/a
2016	"No Choice"	Chief Keef	—N/a
2017	"BDY on Me"	Omarion	—N/a
2017	"Distance"	Omarion	—N/a
2017	"W4W (Word for Word)"	Omarion	—N/a
2017	"F With U"(Featuring Ty Dolla Sign)	Kid Ink	—N/a
2017	"I See You" (Featuring Chris Brown)	Kap G	—N/a
2017	"I'm A Fan" (Featuring Jeremih)	Pia Mia	—N/a
2017	"Jiu Jitsu" (Featuring Chris Brown)	Oneinthe4rest	—N/a
2017	"Don't Matter"	August Alsina	—N/a
2017	"Tone It Down" (Featuring Chris Brown)	Gucci Mane	Mr. Davis
2017	"Anything U Want" (Featuring Wiz Khalifa and Jeremih)	Sevyn Streeter	Girl Disrupted
2017	"Back For More" (Featuring Jeremih)	Justine Skye	—N/a
2017	"Hotel Bathroom"	French Montana	Jungle Rules
2017	"No Pressure" (Featuring Future)	French Montana	Jungle Rules
2017	"Post & Delete" (Featuring Chris Brown)	Zoey Dollaz	—N/a
2017	"Something New" (Featuring Ty Dolla Sign)	Wiz Khalifa	—N/a
2017	"Dawsin's Breek"	Ty Dolla Sign	Beach House 3
2017	"Ex" (Featuring YG)	Ty Dolla Sign	Beach House 3
2017	"Lil Favorite" (Featuring MadeinTyo)	Ty Dolla Sign	Beach House 3
2017	"In Your Phone" (Featuring Lauren Jauregui)	Ty Dolla Sign	Beach House 3
2017	"Droptop in the Rain" (Featuring Tory Lanez)	Ty Dolla Sign	Beach House 3
2017	"All The Time"	Ty Dolla Sign	Beach House 3
2017	"Enormous" (Featuring Ty Dolla Sign)	Gucci Mane	Mr. Davis
2017	Questions	Chris Brown	Heartbreak on a Full Moon
2017	"Roses"	Chris Brown	Heartbreak on a Full Moon
2017	"Sip"	Chris Brown	Heartbreak on a Full Moon
2017	"This Ain't"	Chris Brown	Heartbreak on a Full Moon
2017	"Pull Up"	Chris Brown	Heartbreak on a Full Moon
2017	"Sensei"	Chris Brown	Heartbreak on a Full Moon
2017	"Summer Breeze"	Chris Brown	Heartbreak on a Full Moon
2017	"This Way"	Chris Brown	Heartbreak on a Full Moon
2017	"Reddi Whip"	Chris Brown	Heartbreak on a Full Moon
2017	"Emotions"	Chris Brown	Heartbreak on a Full Moon
2017	"Don't Slow Me Down"	Chris Brown	Heartbreak on a Full Moon
2017	"I Wanna"	Chris Brown	Heartbreak on a Full Moon
2017	"Always" (Featuring Chris Brown & Ty Dolla Sign)	A1 Bentley	—N/a
2018	"Me So Bad" (Featuring French Montana & Ty Dolla $ign)	Tinashe	Joyride
2018	"Give Her Some Money"	Maliibu Miitch	—N/a
2018	"Pineapple" (Featuring Gucci Mane & Quavo)	Ty Dolla $ign	Beach House 3 (Deluxe)
2018	"Clout" (Featuring 21 Savage)	Ty Dolla $ign	Beach House 3 (Deluxe)
2018	"Number"	Ty Dolla $ign	Beach House 3 (Deluxe)
2018	"Drugs" (Featuring Wiz Khalifa)	Ty Dolla $ign	Beach House 3 (Deluxe)
2018	"Simple" (Featuring Yo Gotti)	Ty Dolla $ign	Beach House 3 (Deluxe)
2018	"Lie Detector" (Featuring Lil Pump)	24hrs	—N/a
2018	"The Light"	Jeremih & Ty Dolla $ign	MihTy
2018	"Undo" (Featuring Jeremih & Tory Lanez)	RL Grime	—N/a
2018	"Jaded"	Drake	Scorpion
2018	"Dangerous" (Featuring PnB Rock & Jeremih)	Meek Mill	Legends of the Summer
2018	"ABCD (Friend Zone)"	PnB Rock	—N/a
2018	"No Stylist" (Featuring Drake)	French Montana	—N/a
2018	"Startender" (Featuring Offset & Tyga)	A Boogie wit da Hoodie	Hoodie SZN
2018	"Look Back at It"	A Boogie wit da Hoodie	Hoodie SZN
2018	"The Light"	Jeremih & Ty Dolla $ign	MihTy
2018	"FYT" (Featuring French Montana)	Jeremih & Ty Dolla $ign	MihTy
2018	"Perfect Timing"	Jeremih & Ty Dolla $ign	MihTy
2018	"New Level" (Featuring Lil Wayne)	Jeremih & Ty Dolla $ign	MihTy
2018	"Lie 2 Me"	Jeremih & Ty Dolla $ign	MihTy
2018	"Shootin Shots" (Featuring Ty Dolla $ign & Tory Lanez)	Trey Songz	—N/a
2019	"I Like Girls" (Featuring Lil Skies)	PnB Rock	—N/a
2019	"Rule The World" (Featuring Ariana Grande)	2 Chainz	Rap or Go to the League
2019	"Dirty (Remix)" (Featuring Chris Brown, Feather & Rahky)	Tank	—N/a
2019	"One Thought Away" (Featuring Wiz Khalifa)	Asher Angel	—N/a
2019	"Soakin' Wet" (Featuring Offset & City Girls)	Marlo	—N/a
2019	"All Night Long" (Featuring Trey Songz)	YFN Lucci	—N/a
2019	"Hands Off" (Featuring Jeremih & Ty Dolla $ign)	Gucci Mane	Delusions of Grandeur
2019	"She A Winner" (Featuring City Girls	Trouble	—N/a
2019	"Leave Em Alone" (Featuring Lil Baby, City Girls & PnB Rock)	Layton Greene	—N/a
2019	"Restroom Occupied" (Featuring Chris Brown)	Yella Beezy	Baccend Beezy
2019	"Baguettey" (Featuring Trapboy Freddy)	Yella Beezy	Baccend Beezy
2019	"Trust"	Yella Beezy	Baccend Beezy
2019	"Come Together" (Featuring H.E.R.)	Chris Brown	Indigo
2019	"Emerald / Burgundy" (Featuring Juvenile & Juicy J)	Chris Brown	Indigo
2019	"Sorry Enough"	Chris Brown	Indigo
2019	"H.Y.W.I." (Featuring Christian Combs)	Teyana Taylor	—N/a
2019	"1 Question" (Featuring Jeremih, Chris Brown & Rick Ross)	E-40	Practice Makes Paper
2019	"Fuck It Up" (Featuring Tyga & City Girls)	YBN Nahmir	—N/a
2019	"Hottest in the City" (Featuring Juicy J & Project Pat)	Ty Dolla $ign	—N/a
2019	"Ain't My Fault" (Featuring Boosie Badazz)	Trouble	—N/a
2019	"Thot Box (Remix)" (Featuring Young M.A., Dreezy, Dream Doll, Mulatto & Chinese Kitty)	Hitmaka	—N/a
2019	"Hit Yo Dance" (Featuring Yella Beezy & NLE Choppa)	Rubi Rose	—N/a
2019	"Midnight Hour" (Featuring Ty Dolla $ign)	Skrillex & Boyz Noise	—N/a
2019	"Feelings"	Tinashe	Songs for You
2019	"Cash Race"	Tinashe	Songs for You
2019	"Link Up"	Tinashe	Songs for You
2019	"Surprise Me"	Eric Bellinger	Cuffing Season 3
2019	"Undress"	Eric Bellinger	Cuffing Season 3
2019	"Heaven Sent"	Eric Bellinger	Cuffing Season 3
2019	"Glow Up Together"	Eric Bellinger	Cuffing Season 3
2019	"Material"	Eric Bellinger	Cuffing Season 3
2019	"OMW"	Eric Bellinger	Cuffing Season 3
2019	"Redo"	Eric Bellinger	Cuffing Season 3
2019	"My Mind" (Featuring Jacquees)	Fabolous	Summertime Shootout 3: Coldest Summer Ever
2019	"Choosy" (Featuring Jeremih & Davido)	Fabolous	Summertime Shootout 3: Coldest Summer Ever
2019	"Ooh Yeah" (Featuring Ty Dolla $ign)	Fabolous	Summertime Shootout 3: Coldest Summer Ever
2019	"Options" (Featuring PnB Rock, Gucci Mane & 2 Chainz)	Fabolous	Summertime Shootout 3: Coldest Summer Ever
2019	"Too Late" (Featuring Jeremih)	Fabolous	Summertime Shootout 3: Coldest Summer Ever
2021	"X" (featuring Jeremih)	Tinashe	333
2024	"Paid"	¥$ (Kanye West and Ty Dolla Sign)	Vultures 1
2024	"Do It" (featuring YG)	¥$ (Kanye West and Ty Dolla Sign)	Vultures 1
