= A1 Bentley =

American record producer

Floyd "A1" Bentley
- Also known as: A1, SprngBrk
- Born: Floyd Eugene Bentley III; July 6, 1987 (age 39); Kansas City, Kansas, U.S.
- Genres: R&B; pop; hip hop
- Occupations: Record producer; songwriter; television personality
- Labels: Beat House; Pulse Music Publishing
- Spouse: Lyrica Anderson (m. 2016; div. 2022)

Floyd Eugene Bentley III (born July 7, 1987), also known by his stage names A1 and SprngBrk, is an American record producer and songwriter. He has been credited on singles and albums for prominent music industry artists including Drake, Chris Brown, Trey Songz and Future, among others. He co-wrote the latter's 2022 single "Wait for U", which peaked atop the Billboard Hot 100 and won a Grammy Award. Bentley has often worked in tandem with fellow producer Hitmaka and his former spouse, Lyrica Anderson.

In his personal life, Bentley's relationship with Anderson has been publicized on the reality television series Love & Hip Hop: Hollywood, where Bentley appeared on seasons 3 through 6, as well as other various other reality shows.

== Career ==
=== Early life ===
Bentley grew up on “the rough side of Kansas City”, and was accepted to Highland Community College, where he played basketball. In his junior year, Bentley suffered a serious leg injury, making the decision to subsequently leave both the basketball team and college. After returning home and starting a job, Bentley began to write songs and rap, attracting the interest of an early manager. He quickly realized that his passion was music, and moved to Los Angeles to break into the music industry. Bentley experienced homelessness for 8 months before a chance encounter with Tony! Toni! Toné! artist and producer Raphael Saadiq, who allowed him to use his studio for six months after hearing several early demos. Saadiq also introduced him to Mike Caren, the former Executive President of A&R at Atlantic Records. Caren subsequently gave Bentley the opportunity to write for several artists in his roster, including Trey Songz and Tank.

=== 2010–2018: Initial songwriting success ===
In 2010, Bentley co-wrote "Unusual" featuring Drake for American singer Trey Songz, which entered the Billboard Hot 100, peaked at number seven on the US Hot R&B/Hip-Hop Songs chart, and won Bentley an ASCAP Rhythm & Soul Award. Over the next five years, he also received album placements on various Tank, Chris Brown, and Jason Derulo projects. In 2016, Bentley released his debut single "Upside Down" featuring rapper O.T. Genasis. Bentley began to create a closer relationship with Chris Brown's camp at this time, accepting potential album submissions and demos for Brown from other songwriters. In 2017. Bentley contributed twelve songs to Chris Brown's album Heartbreak on a Full Moon, including multi-platinum single "Party" featuring Usher and Gucci Mane, as well as platinum single "Questions". Bentley would also co-write and co-produce "No Pressure" for French Montana's Jungle Rules project, as well as co-write and co-produce Platinum single "Something New" for Wiz Khalifa and Ty Dolla Sign, which went viral as the result of a summer TikTok dance challenge.

=== 2019–present: SprngBrk ===
In 2019, through a Power 106 interview, Bentley was announced as a new artist signee of T-Pain's record label Nappy Boy Entertainment, releasing debut mixtape Turbulence, before changing his artist name to SprngBrk as a form of "reintroduction" after his reality TV appearances. Bentley released single "Pride" in 2021, as the first release in a new collaboration between Nappy Boy and music streaming platform SoundCloud's RePost A&R creation department. In 2022, Bentley co-wrote two songs from Future's album I Never Liked You, including multi-platinum, Billboard number-one single "Wait For U".

== Personal life ==
Bentley met fellow artist-songwriter Lyrica Anderson in an elevator at a Los Angeles area studio prior to a songwriting session for a mutual friend, before getting married in 2016. Together they have one son, Ocean Zion Bentley, born in 2018. Anderson filed for divorce in 2022 for undisclosed reasons.

== Discography ==
=== Studio projects ===
- Love Scars EP (with Lyrica Anderson) (2016)
- Turbulence (2019)

=== Guest appearances ===
List of guest appearances, with other performing artists, showing year released and album name
Title	Year	Other performer(s)	Album
"Sensei"	2017	Chris Brown	Heartbreak on a Full Moon

=== Songwriting and production credits ===
Credits are courtesy of Discogs, Tidal, Apple Music, and AllMusic.

Title	Year	Artist	Album
"Unusual" (featuring Drake)	2010	Trey Songz	Passion, Pain & Pleasure
"I'm Pouring My Heart Out"	2010	Norman Brown	Sending My Love
"Stingy" (featuring Donnie Wahlberg)	2011	Jordan Knight	Unfinished
"Lonely" (featuring Chris Brown)	2012	Tank	This Is How I Feel
"Nowhere" (featuring Busta Rhymes)	2012	Tank	This Is How I Feel
"I'm Gone" (featuring Big Sean)	2012	Tyga	Careless World: Rise of the Last King
"All We Do"	2014	Trey Songz	Trigga
"Valet" (featuring Pleasure P & TeeFlii)	2014	Eric Bellinger	Choose Up Season
"Little Bit"	2015	Chris Brown	Royalty
"Wrist" (featuring Solo Lucci)	2015	Chris Brown	Royalty
"Love Like That" (featuring K. Michelle)	2015	Jason Derulo	Everything Is 4
"I Just Wanna" (featuring Dej Loaf)	2015	Elijah Blake	Shadows & Diamonds
"Wrist Remix (featuring Young Thug & Jeezy)	2016	Chris Brown	Before the Trap: Nights in Tarzana
"I Need Love" (featuring Hoody Baby, Young Blacc)	2016	Chris Brown	Before the Trap: Nights in Tarzana
"Partyin' Next Door" (featuring Young Blacc)	2016	Chris Brown	Before the Trap: Nights in Tarzana
"Questions"	2017	Chris Brown	Heartbreak on a Full Moon
"Roses"	2017	Chris Brown	Heartbreak on a Full Moon
"Confidence"	2017	Chris Brown	Heartbreak on a Full Moon
"Sip"	2017	Chris Brown	Heartbreak on a Full Moon
"Hope You Do"	2017	Chris Brown	Heartbreak on a Full Moon
"Pull Up"	2017	Chris Brown	Heartbreak on a Full Moon
"Party (featuring Usher & Gucci Mane)	2017	Chris Brown	Heartbreak on a Full Moon
"Summer Breeze"	2017	Chris Brown	Heartbreak on a Full Moon
"If You're Down"	2017	Chris Brown	Heartbreak on a Full Moon
"Run Away"	2017	Chris Brown	Heartbreak on a Full Moon
"Don't Slow Me Down"	2017	Chris Brown	Heartbreak on a Full Moon
"I Wanna"	2017	Chris Brown	Heartbreak on a Full Moon
"Hotel Bathroom"	2017	French Montana	Jungle Rules
"No Pressure" (featuring Future)	2017	French Montana	Jungle Rules
"Classic You" (featuring Chris Brown)	2017	T-Pain	Oblivion
"No Rush"	2017	T-Pain	Oblivion
"Ex" (featuring YG)	2017	Ty Dolla Sign	Beach House 3
"Enormous" (featuring Ty Dolla Sign)	2017	Gucci Mane	Mr. Davis
"Tone It Down" (featuring Chris Brown)	2017	Gucci Mane	Mr. Davis
"Crash & Burn" (featuring Kehlani)	2017	G-Eazy	The Beautiful & Damned
"Don't Get Much Better" (with Jeremih & Sage the Gemini)	2017	Ty Dolla Sign	The Fate of the Furious (soundtrack)
"Pie" (featuring Chris Brown)	2017	Future	Hndrxx
"Me So Bad" (featuring Ty Dolla Sign & French Montana)	2018	Tinashe	Joyride
"Something New" (featuring Ty Dolla Sign)	2018	Wiz Khalifa	Rolling Papers 2
"Goin Thru Some Thangz"	2018	MihTy	MihTy
"New Level"	2018	MihTy	MihTy
"Take Your Time"	2018	MihTy	MihTy
"These Days"	2018	MihTy	MihTy
"Imitate"	2018	MihTy	MihTy
"You Like That"	2019	Chris Brown	Indigo
"Cheetah"	2019	Chris Brown	Indigo
"Part of the Plan"	2019	Chris Brown	Indigo
"Technology"	2019	Chris Brown	Indigo
"No Stylist" (featuring Drake)	2019	French Montana	Montana
"I Got Time" (featuring Shad Da God)	2020	Chris Brown & Young Thug	Slime & B
"Undrunk" (featuring Too Short & E-40)	2020	Chris Brown	Slime & B
"Wait for U" (featuring Drake & Tems)	2022	Future	I Never Liked You
"Back to the Basics"	2022	Future	I Never Liked You
"Hmhmm" (featuring EST Gee)	2022	Chris Brown	Breezy
"Hate Me Tomorrow"	2022	Chris Brown	Breezy
"Closure" (featuring H.E.R.)	2022	Chris Brown	Breezy
"Need A Friend"	2023	Chris Brown	11:11
"Go Girlfriend"	2023	Chris Brown	11:11
"Residuals"	2024	Chris Brown	11:11 (Deluxe Edition)
"Questions"	2024	Mario	Glad You Came
"#BodyGoals" (featuring Tank)	2026	Chris Brown	Brown

== Filmography ==
=== Television ===
Year	Title	Role	Notes	Ref.
2016–2019	Love & Hip Hop: Hollywood	Himself	54 Episodes - Supporting Cast S3-S4; Main Cast S5-S6	
2017	Hollywood Unlocked With Jason Lee Uncensored	Himself	1 Episode	
2017	Love & Hip-Hop Hollywood: Dirty Little Secrets	Himself	1 Episode	
2018	Love & Hip Hop: New York: The Love Edition	Himself	1 Episode	
2019	Love & Hip-Hop Awards: Most Certified	Himself	1 Episode	
2019	40 Greatest Love & Hip Hop Moments: The Reboot – Part 1 & 2	Himself	2 Episodes	
2020	The Conversation	Himself	2 Episodes - S1.4 - 1.5	
2022	Marriage Boot Camp: Reality Stars 17 - Hip Hop Edition 5	Himself	10 Episodes - Main Cast S19	

== Awards and nominations ==
Year	Work	Award	Result	Ref
2012	ASCAP Rhythm & Soul Awards	Award-Winning Songs (Unusual)	Won	
2023	65th Annual Grammy Awards	Grammy Award for Best Rap Song (Wait for U)	Nominated	
2023	65th Annual Grammy Awards	Grammy Award for Best Melodic Rap Performance (Wait for U) ^{A}	Won	
2023	BMI R&B/Hip-Hop Awards	Most-Performed Songs (Wait for U)	Won	

=== Notes ===
A. ^{A} Winning songwriters in this category are awarded with a Winner's Certificate.
