= Tempo (Chris Brown song) =

Single by Chris Brown

from the album Heartbreak on a Full Moon
- Released: February 6, 2018
- Studio: Paramount (Los Angeles)
- Genre: R&B
- Length: 3:38
- Label: RCA; CBE
- Songwriter(s): Chris Brown; Sean Momberger
- Producer(s): Sean Momberger

Chris Brown singles chronology
"Melanin Magic" (2018)	"Tempo" (2018)	"Love You Better" (2018)

Music video
- "Tempo" on YouTube

"Tempo" is a song by American singer Chris Brown from his eighth studio album, Heartbreak on a Full Moon (2017). It was released by RCA Records as the sixth single from the album on February 6, 2018. The song rose to number 36 on Billboard's Hot R&B/Hip-hop singles chart during the week of April 7.

== Music video ==
On March 2, 2018, Brown uploaded the music video for "Tempo" on his YouTube and Vevo account.

== Charts ==
=== Weekly charts ===
Weekly chart performance for "Tempo"
Chart (2018)	Peak position
US Billboard Hot 100	88
US Hot R&B/Hip-Hop Songs (Billboard)	36
US R&B/Hip-Hop Airplay (Billboard)	19

=== Year-end charts ===
2018 year-end chart performance for "Tempo"
Chart (2018)	Position
US Hot R&B Songs (Billboard)	21

== Certifications ==
Certifications for "Tempo"
Region	Certification	Certified units/sales
Australia (ARIA)	Gold	35,000^{‡}
New Zealand (RMNZ)	Gold	15,000^{‡}
United States (RIAA)	2× Platinum	2,000,000^{‡}
^{‡} Sales+streaming figures based on certification alone.
