= To My Bed =

Song by Chris Brown

from the album Heartbreak on a Full Moon
- Released: October 31, 2017
- Recorded: 2016
- Studio: Paramount Studios, Los Angeles
- Genre: Alternative R&B
- Length: 4:33
- Label: RCA
- Songwriter(s): Chris Brown; Ellery McKinney
- Producer(s): Ayo; Keyz; EY

Music video
- "To My Bed" on YouTube

"To My Bed" is a song by American singer Chris Brown, taken from his eight studio album Heartbreak on a Full Moon. Despite not being released as a single, the song was certified Platinum by the Recording Industry Association of America (RIAA).

== Background and release ==
In November 2016, Brown released videos on his Instagram account where he teased snippets of then-unreleased songs, including "Surprise You", "I See You", "To My Bed" and "Classic You". When Brown unveiled Heartbreak on a Full Moon 's initial track listing on May 2, 2017, "To My Bed" was not included on it. On September 10, 2017, the illegal website MusicMafia, leaked "To My Bed", after reaching 500.000 clicks of request for the song following their teaser for it. On October 13, 2017, the song was announced to be included on the album, with its final tracklist being revealed.

== Composition and lyrics ==
"To My Bed" is a "trap-styled" alternative R&B slow-jam, with a "skeletal" production. It contains an interpolation of the 1997 song "Nice & Slow", by Usher. The song's lyrics feature Brown expressing to a girl his sexual desires towards her and how their chemistry would result in them making love even before they get to his bed. Vulture found the track to be part of Heartbreak on a Full Moon's "sultry" side. Brown's vocal performance showcases his singing on the majority of the song, switching to his rapping on its last verse. "To My Bed" features screaming background vocals throughout the track.

== Music video ==
"To My Bed"'s music video was directed by Brown with Daniel CZ, and was released on July 2, 2018. According to XXL Magazine, the video "draws inspiration from the movie Blade Runner 2049 with its other worldly elements", being located in a "futuristic utopia", with Brown performing "his signature dance moves as he attempts to gain the attention of an elusive love interest". HotNewHipHop praised it, stating that "the highlight of the video is the extraordinary choreography that goes with it".

== Charts ==
Chart performance for "To My Bed"
Chart (2017)	Peak position
US Hot R&B Songs (Billboard)	21

== Certifications ==
Certifications for "To My Bed"
Region	Certification	Certified units/sales
United States (RIAA)	Platinum	1,000,000^{‡}
^{‡} Sales+streaming figures based on certification alone.
