= City Girls (song) =

Song by Chris Brown and Young Thug

from the album Slime & B
- Released: May 5, 2020
- Recorded: 2020
- Studio: CBE (Tarzana)
- Genre: R&B; trap
- Length: 3:50
- Label: CBE, RCA
- Songwriters: Brown; J. Williams; Miles McCollum; Jatavia Johnson; Isaac Bynum; Steven Tolson
- Producer: The Audibles

Music video
- "City Girls" on YouTube

"City Girls" is a song by American singer Chris Brown and American rapper Young Thug from their 2020 collaborative mixtape, Slime & B.

== Background and composition ==
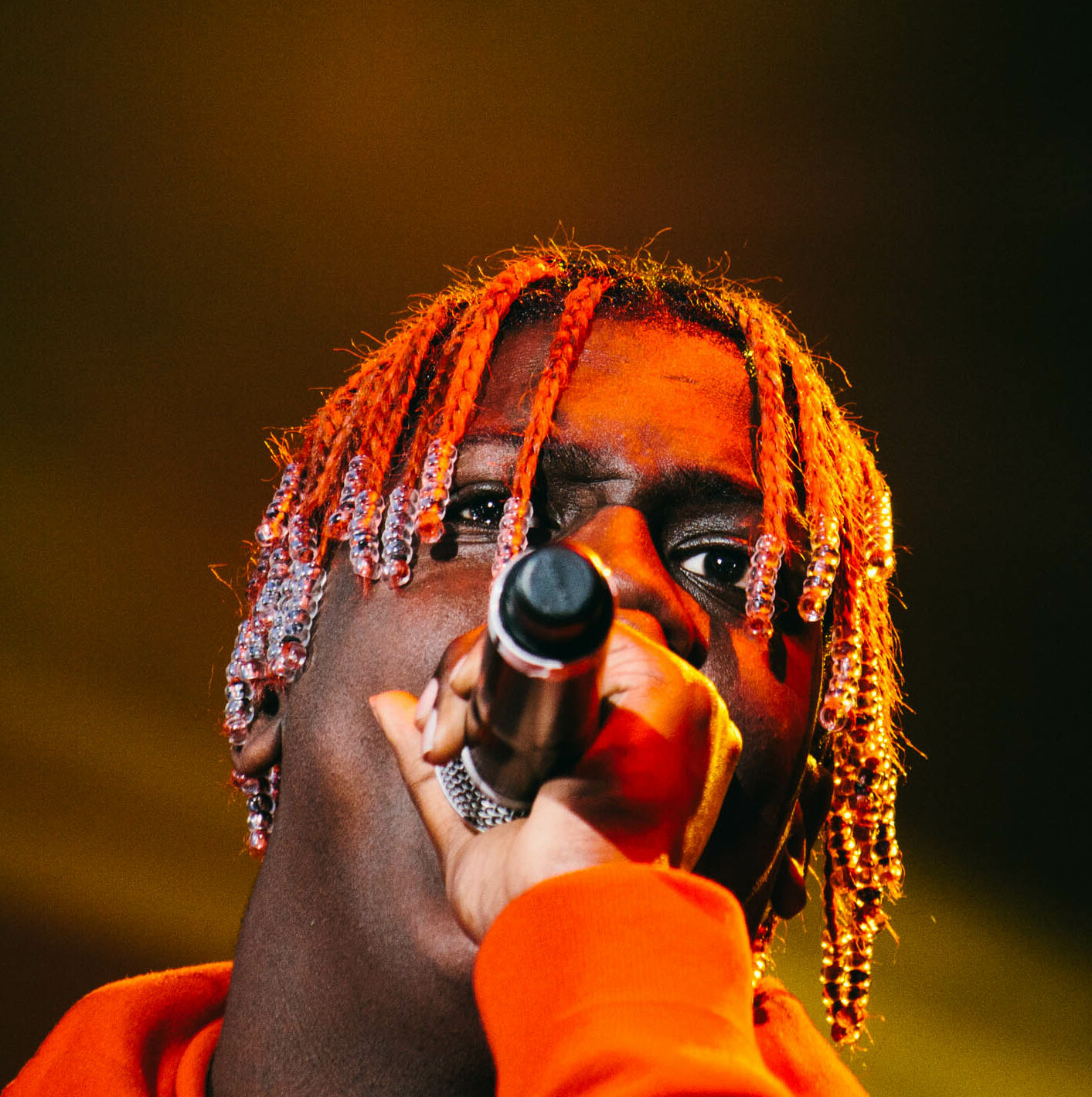
"City Girls" was co-written by rapper Lil Yachty (pictured)

"City Girls" was written by Chris Brown, Young Thug, American rappers Lil Yachty and JT of the hip hop duo City Girls, Isaac Bynum, and Steven Tolson. Its production was handled by The Audibles. According to Revolt, the track features Brown and Young Thug harmonizing about pleasure-seeking city girls.

== Music video ==
"City Girls"'s official music video was released on December 4, 2020. It was directed by Brown's frequent collaborator, and ex-tour photographer Jake Miosge. The video was filmed in downtown Los Angeles, and features a 1940s gangster scenario. According to The Source, the video "takes on a mini-movie form", having a total run-time of 7 minutes and 8 seconds. HipHopDX praised it for its "cinematic experience", also complimenting Brown's dancing.

=== Synopsis ===
Narrated by Lillo Brancato Jr., who starred in the movie A Bronx Tale directed by Robert De Niro, the clip finds Chris Brown at a downtown Los Angeles burlesque "cabaret-style" club, where he falls for a dancer, who hypnotizes him with her moves. But moments later, chaos erupts when Young Thug walks in. Intercut with plenty of footage of Brown dancing, the video eventually erupts into violence between the duo and the local mobsters. Despite a hail of bullets, Brown escapes unscathed with the lady on his arm.

== Charts ==
Chart performance for "City Girls"
Chart (2020)	Peak position
New Zealand Hot Singles (RMNZ)	31
US Hot R&B Songs (Billboard)	22

== Certifications ==
Certifications for "City Girls"
Region	Certification	Certified units/sales
New Zealand (RMNZ)	Platinum	30,000^{‡}
United States (RIAA)	Gold	500,000^{‡}
^{‡} Sales+streaming figures based on certification alone.
