= Grass Ain't Greener =

Single by Chris Brown

from the album Heartbreak on a Full Moon
- Released: May 5, 2016
- Recorded: 2015
- Studio: Record Plant (Los Angeles, California)
- Genre: Alternative R&B; trap
- Length: 3:21
- Label: RCA
- Songwriters: Chris Brown; Prince Chrishan
- Producer: Nikhil

Chris Brown singles chronology
"Wishing" (2016)	"Grass Ain't Greener" (2016)	"I'm the Man (Remix)" (2016)

Music video
- "Grass Ain't Greener" on YouTube

"Grass Ain't Greener" is a song by American singer Chris Brown released on May 5, 2016 as the lead single from Brown's eighth studio album, Heartbreak on a Full Moon. The song was written by Brown and Prince Chrishan, and produced by Nikhil. "Grass Ain't Greener" is a mid-tempo alternative R&B and trap song, that explores themes of breakup and untrusting love relationships.

The song obtained positive reviews from music critics, who complimented its lyrical production and Brown's overall performance. Some noted it as Brown's first introduction to "dark R&B". The song received moderate success, being certified platinum by the Recording Industry Association of America (RIAA), Platinum by Australian Recording Industry Association (ARIA), and silver by the British Phonographic Industry (BPI).

A music video, shot in the desertified surroundings of Los Angeles, and in a forest outside Fresno, California, was released on August 26, 2016, and displays, though a "cinematic" and "dark" atmosphere, a "mysterious" storyline about Brown following his ex-girlfriend to a foggy club that ends up being full of vampires.

== Background, recording and release ==
The song was one of the first tracks that Brown recorded for his eighth studio album, Heartbreak on a Full Moon. It was recorded in late 2015 at Record Plant in Los Angeles, California.

On January 10, 2016, Brown previewed some unreleased songs on his Periscope and Instagram profiles, through videos of him dancing and lip-synching to these tracks in the studio. ‘Grass Ain’t Greener’ was among them. On April 27, Brown announced the mixtape Before the Trap: Nights in Tarzana, the European leg of his One Hell of a Nite Tour, and the release of a new single on May 5. On May 3, he revealed that the single would be "Grass Ain't Greener", showing its artwork and announcing it as the first single from his upcoming album titled Heartbreak on a Full Moon. The single was released on May 5, 2016, on Brown’s 27th birthday. "Grass Ain't Greener" was not included on the album’s first announced track listing. It was later added as a bonus track on the official tracklist when the album became available for pre-order.

== Composition and lyrics ==
"Grass Ain't Greener" is a mid-tempo alternative R&B song, with a bouncy tune, and a trap production. The song was written by Chris Brown and Prince Chrishan, while its production, based on Roland TR-808 drums, was handled by Nikhil Seetharam. On "Grass Ain't Greener", Brown sings the first two verses and the chorus, and raps the final verse.

Lyrically, in the song Brown addresses how his second lover became his main girlfriend, combining passion and romance, but their relationship changed for the worse, ending up in a bitter breakup. In the track, Brown is wary of the intentions of his female liaisons, while calling out his ex-girlfriend for putting on a false facade to impress others, lamenting that he's tired of texting her, as he sings "I know what you want, but you're not gon' get it (...) You do what you want with somebody else / I'm gone, baby". Media outlets speculated that the song's lyrics were referring to Brown's relationship with his ex-girlfriend Karrueche Tran.

== Critical reception ==
Carl Lamare of Billboard said that the song is "Brown['s] first major attempt at the whole "dark R&B" craze, and it works perfectly" describing it as featuring "brutally honest lyrics over a beat that's somber, but danceable". Adam Fleischer of MTV said that Brown sings about "how the two don't play nicely together no more", commending Brown's "heartfelt vocals" and its lyrics, which he found to be "very relatable to his private life". XXL's writer Mark Stainser said that the song's production "matches impeccably Brown's voice", defining it as "one of the best R&B cuts of 2016".

== Music video ==
On August 26, 2016, Chris Brown uploaded the music video for "Grass Ain't Greener" on his YouTube and Vevo account. The video was directed by Brown, and shot in August in the desertified surroundings of Los Angeles, and in a forest outside Fresno, California.

=== Synopsis ===
The video starts with Brown driving towards a party in the desertified surroundings of Los Angeles, with his friends in the car, played by members of his OHB crew, who are skeptical, claiming that he’s 'always chasing a girl', and mention that his ex-girlfriend might be at the party. Upon arriving at the foggy club, they notice dancers in lingerie lying in hoops suspended from the ceiling. Brown looks around as flashes of his ex-girlfriend appear in his mind. The girl is dressed in tribal-like clothing with white paint on her body. Brown starts chasing a girl in a black bikini top, who bites his neck: the dancers turn out to be vampires. The video concludes with the girl from the initial flashes seductively looking at the camera before turning and walking away into the forest.

=== Reception ===
Capital XTRA called the video "cinematic" and "dark". A writer for Rap-Up described the video as "mysterious". 2DBZ and Urban Islandz stated that the character of Brown's ex-girlfriend in the video might be a reference to Karrueche Tran.

== Charts ==
=== Weekly charts ===
Weekly chart performance for "Grass Ain't Greener"
Chart (2016)	Peak position
Australia (ARIA)	97
Australia Urban (ARIA)	11
UK Singles (Official Charts)	100
UK Hip Hop/R&B (Official Charts)	31
US Billboard Hot 100	71
US Hot R&B/Hip-Hop Songs (Billboard)	23
US R&B/Hip-Hop Airplay (Billboard)	15
US Rhythmic Airplay (Billboard)	40

=== Year-end charts ===
2016 year-end chart performance for "Grass Ain't Greener"
Chart (2016)	Position
US Hot R&B/Hip-Hop Songs (Billboard)	94
US R&B/Hip-Hop Airplay (Billboard)	50

== Certifications ==
Certifications for "Grass Ain't Greener"
Region	Certification	Certified units/sales
Australia (ARIA)	Platinum	70,000^{‡}
Denmark (IFPI Danmark)	Gold	45,000^{‡}
New Zealand (RMNZ)	2× Platinum	60,000^{‡}
United Kingdom (BPI)	Silver	200,000^{‡}
United States (RIAA)	2× Platinum	2,000,000^{‡}
^{‡} Sales+streaming figures based on certification alone.

== Release history ==
Region	Date	Format	Label	Ref.
Worldwide	May 5, 2016	Digital download	RCA	
United States	June 21, 2016	Rhythmic contemporary	RCA	
