= Heartbreak on a Full Moon =

Studio album by Chris Brown
- Released: October 31, 2017
- Recorded: 2015–2017
- Studios: Paramount (Los Angeles); Record Plant (Los Angeles); Platinum Sound (New York City); Jungle City (New York City); Quad (New York City); CBE (Tarzana); Chalice (Hollywood)
- Genres: R&B; hip-hop
- Length: 158:33
- Labels: Black Pyramid; CBE; RCA
- Producers: A1; ADP; Amadeus; Ayo; BHam; Boi-1da; Cam Wallace; Cardiak; Cratos; D. A. Doman; Danja; Deko; Don Jarvis; Daecolm Holland; Dre Moon; EY; Foreign Teck; Hitmaka; ISM; J-Bo; J-Louis; Keyz; Milk+Sizz; Nikhil; Nija; OG Parker; OZ; P2J; Pip Kembo; Prince Chrishan; Qkauztion; Richie Souf; Scott Storch; Scribz; Sean Momberger; Sevn Thomas; Smash David; Soundz; Syk Sense; Tariq Beats; The Martianz; Txpski; Vontae Thomas; Xeryus G

Chris Brown chronology
Royalty (2015)	Heartbreak on a Full Moon (2017)	Indigo (2019)

Deluxe edition cover
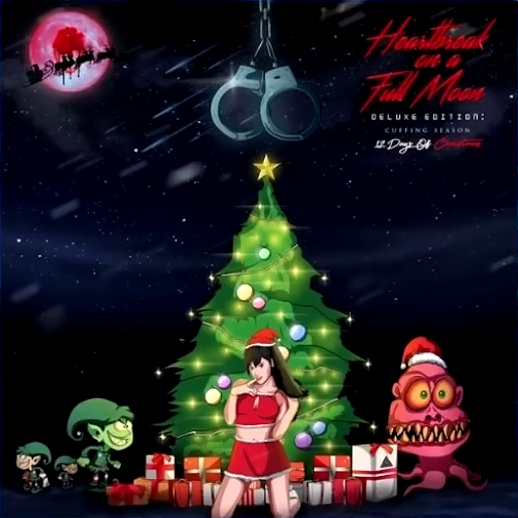
- Cuffing Season – 12 Days of Christmas

Singles from Heartbreak on a Full Moon
- 1. "Grass Ain't Greener" Released: May 5, 2016; 2. "Party" Released: December 16, 2016; 3. "Privacy" Released: March 24, 2017; 4. "Pills & Automobiles" Released: August 4, 2017; 5. "Questions" Released: August 16, 2017; 6. "Tempo" Released: February 6, 2018

Heartbreak on a Full Moon is the eighth studio album by the American singer Chris Brown. The album was released digitally on Halloween 2017, and three days later it was released by RCA Records as a double-disc package, consisting of 45 tracks. Brown worked with several producers, including Prince Chrishan, A1, Amadeus, Boi-1da, D. A. Doman, and Scott Storch. The album also features guest appearances by Jhené Aiko, R. Kelly, Dej Loaf, Lil Yachty, Usher, Gucci Mane, Yo Gotti, A Boogie wit da Hoodie, Kodak Black, Future, Young Thug, Ty Dolla Sign, and Verse Simmonds, with the deluxe edition having additional features from Agnez Mo, Trippie Redd, Ella Mai, and Solo Lucci. Recording sessions for Heartbreak on a Full Moon took place between the end of 2015 and August 2017.

Heartbreak on a Full Moon is an R&B and hip-hop album that also incorporates genres such as alternative R&B, trap, pop and dancehall. The album features a darker sound compared to Brown’s other work, with heavy lyrical emphasis on the pain of breakup and escaping sorrows through a hedonistic lifestyle. Its lyrics are thought to have been inspired by Brown's breakup with Karrueche Tran. Although Brown was able to convince RCA Records of the album's length, they were initially hesitant. Heartbreak on a Full Moon received polarizing reviews from music critics, that praised Brown's performances, but expressed divided opinions relating to the album's unorthodox length.

One week after its release Heartbreak on a Full Moon was certified gold by the Recording Industry Association of America (RIAA) for combined sales and album-equivalent units of over 500,000 units in the United States, and became the first album by an R&B male artist since Jamie Foxx's Unpredictable (2005) to be certified gold within a week. It has since been certified double platinum by the RIAA. The album was anticipated with multiple snippets, which built anticipation for its release since early 2016. Six official singles were released from Heartbreak on a Full Moon: "Grass Ain't Greener", "Party", "Privacy", "Pills & Automobiles", "Questions", and "Tempo".

Heartbreak on a Full Moon is credited with pioneering lengthier albums in the music streaming era, paving the way for urban artists, such as Drake, Kanye West and SZA, to make albums with over 20 songs.

== Background and recording ==
Brown started recording tracks for Heartbreak on a Full Moon a few weeks before the release of Royalty in late 2015. He continued working on the album during 2016 and 2017 in between the European leg of the One Hell of a Nite Tour and The Party Tour. Brown also built a home recording studio to record songs for the album. The recording sessions mostly took place in Los Angeles and New York City. One track, "Bite My Tongue", was left over from the sessions for Royalty.

During the album's creation, Brown believed he had made too many songs to fit on a single album, so he decided to make a 40-track album. He said in a 2017 interview with Nessa, that with Heartbreak on a Full Moon’s unorthodox length he wanted to "outdo expectations" and "push the boundaries on artistry". RCA Records initially did not want to release an album of such length, thinking this would damage its commercial performance, but the singer ended up convincing them otherwise. Brown involved over 50 producers, including A1, Amadeus, Prince Chrishan, Scott Storch, D.A. Got That Dope, Hitmaka and OG Parker, in the recording sessions. Recording eventually ended in August 2017, with "Rock Your Body" being the last track completed. According to an investigative article published by Billboard in February 2017, the period during which the album was created was marked by Brown's heavy drug use.

The singer explained the concept for the album in August 2017 during an interview for Complex, saying, "I thought Heartbreak on a Full Moon was a depiction of what my soul wanted to say. It's funny because we're doing a double album. I've done so many records, but all of the records, to me, are personal favorites and I feel like it gets what I want to say across." Regarding the content of Heartbreak on a Full Moon, Brown explained that it's “about everything that I went through. (...) I wanted to do songs with substance, R&B, Hip Hop. And you get every facet of who I am at this age.” When discussing its musicality, he added that he “wanted to capture all basis of who my audience liked. What songs they could actually identify with”.

== Music and lyrics ==
"This Ain't"
A sample of "This Ain't", where the singer expresses his desire to have a love relationship with a woman, but realizes their relationship consists of sex without love involvement.

"Pull Up"
A sample of "Pull Up", featuring a "horror-themed" melody, and lyrics about having sex being under the influence of cocaine.

Heartbreak on a Full Moon is an R&B album, that also incorporates hip hop, alternative R&B, trap, pop and dancehall. Brown's performances on the album often switch from his R&B singing to his rapping.

The album's songwriting was described as capturing the entire spectrum of emotions the singer experienced in the aftermath of a heartfelt breakup. Critics have speculated that the album's lyrical content was inspired by Brown's breakup with his ex-girlfriend, Karrueche Tran, describing her as the emotional muse behind its material. Its themes encompass regret, the transformation of love into hatred, internal conflict, and the struggle to move on from someone. Several songs of the album also portray the singer's attempt to escape his sorrow through a reckless and promiscuous lifestyle, only to realize that such actions cannot numb the pain of heartbreak. According to Andy Kellman of AllMusic, the character portrayed by Brown on Heartbreak on a Full Moon "often mood swings from playboy-hedonistic to sweet-romantic to scorned-acidic to sorrowful-heartbroken". Analyzing its lyrical content Prezzy of The Boombox said that "throughout the first disc the singer tries to exorcise the demons of love lost, while on the second one he mostly pours out the torments of his heartbreak". Renowned for Sound stated that "The first disc is a hedonistic mix of moody and lascivious", while the second half of the album has a "somber feel", with the "break-up tracks" showing the singer's "emotional side". Vulture's writer Craig Jenkins found the sexual content of various songs of the first half of Heartbreak on a Full Moon to be "loaded with raunchy invitations for sex" and filled with "X-rated" subjects like "sex in hallways, drunken hookups, and girls who mix cocaine and painkillers. Jenkins wrote that the "breakup tracks' intensity" is elevated by "shattered, jilted reflection and profound yearning" transmitted through Brown's "pleading tenor voice".

== Songs ==
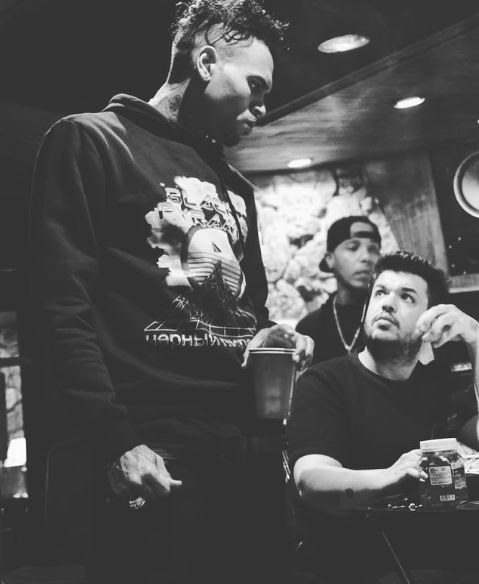
Brown (left) and mixing engineer Patrizio Pigliapoco (right) working on the album in 2016.

Heartbreak on a Full Moon starts with "Lost & Found", a song where the singer depicts the situation of a hurtful breakup in the making, being sung in perspective to the girl he's dealing with. The song's production features slow chords of bass and guitar mixed with sporadic percussions. The crooner's vocals on the track showcase a melancholic intonation in the first verse, becoming more demanding and aggressive during the second verse, ending with an auto-tuned third verse where Brown raps. According to HotNewHipHop, on the opening track “he waxes poetic about a femme fatal addicted to the high life [...] utilizing a lower register on the chorus”. Throughout the album the lyrics depict the pain of the singer reflected on his thoughts and feelings, and how he tries to escape it with parties, sex and drugs. The title track features Brown “lamenting his broken heart” over a “boom bap beat”. On the hip hop-influenced songs "Everybody Knows" and "Hurt the Same", the singer “[mixes] venom with vulnerability”, accusing the woman he loved of being insensitive and ungrateful. Brown “front-faces vulnerability” on the “regretful” songs "Enemy", "Tough Love" and "Even", apologizing to his ex-girlfriend for hurting her, sadly reminiscing the best moments passed together. "Privacy", "To My Bed", "Covered In You", "Tell Me What to Do" and "Rock Your Body" feature sexual content, with the singer approaching women in sultry ways.

"Nowhere"
A sample of Brown's "soulful" vocals on "Nowhere", where he painfully reminisce on his past relationship.

"This Ain't" was described as a "quasi-ballad" showcasing the singer's “sensitive side”, with lyrics about Brown realizing that a woman treats their "lovin'" relationship as just physical. "Sip", "Hope You Do", and "Pills & Automobiles" feature lyrics about having sex under the influence of alcohol or drugs. On "Paradise", he pines for his ex-girlfriend, admitting he treated her wrong. "Nowhere" is a "soul-tinged" song where Brown expresses not being able to get over his ex-girlfriend following their breakup. On the dancehall pop track "If You're Down" he asks his loved one to turn her back on the complicated and frustrating things in life and instead decide to live in the moment with him embracing each other. "Run Away" is a story of two people in love that try to escape from police brutality. The song is a response to police's violence aimed at unarmed African Americans in the United States, that also makes a reference to the “Hands up, don't shoot” slogan that was created after the shooting of Michael Brown. "Bite My Tongue" and "Frustrated" showcase the "pop-styled" side of the singer, with the former being an “alternative pop” track featuring "alarm whine and futuristic pre-hook vocal blips", and the latter having a “chill house” and electropop instrumental. On the “bright” dancehall track "This Way" the singer ironically thanks his ex-girlfriend for leaving him when he wasn't ready for the relationship to cease, because now he's happier living a promiscuous lifestyle. The final track of the album, "Yellow Tape," features Brown contemplating the darker aspects of fame and his struggles to cope with his pain. He laments how his hedonistic lifestyle is filled with superficial emotions that fail to numb his suffering, ultimately leading to his suicide.

== Artwork ==
The cover art for the album was announced on October 5, 2017. It features a pink full moon set against a starry night sky, topped with a graphic of a bleeding human heart, from which blood drips and transforms into ink. The pink moon symbolizes the album's themes, primarily centered around girls, love, heartbreak, and sex. Meanwhile, the bleeding heart, with its blood transforming into ink, embodies the raw, heartfelt emotions expressed by the singer in the album's lyrics.

Ebbiana of The Source praised the cover for being "very creative". Capital Xtra's Gayle Blewnsky said that the cover is "cartoon-esque". ABC News's Randy Holmes commended its drawing style, saying that the "anatomically-correct heart looks as though it was just ripped out of someone's chest".

== Release and promotion ==
On January 10, 2016, Brown previewed 9 unreleased songs during a live on Periscope, and the song "Grass Ain't Greener" on Instagram. From January through March 2016, he released videos on his Instagram profile previewing the unreleased songs "Lost and Found" "Sip", "Notice" and "Dead Wrong". In late February and March he performed some of the previewed songs live during his club performances in Barcelona, Leeuwarden, Milan, Madrid and Lisbon. On April 27 through Twitter, he announced the European leg of his One Hell of a Nite Tour, the documentary Welcome to My Life, his collaborative mixtape with his OHB group, Before the Trap: Nights in Tarzana, and the release of a new single on May 5, the day of Brown's 27th birthday. On May 3 he revealed that the single would be the already previewed "Grass Ain't Greener", announcing his eighth solo album Heartbreak on a Full Moon.

Brown also released extra tracks on SoundCloud during this time. On July 7, 2016, he released two tracks, "My Friend" and "A Lot of Love", in the wake of the then-recent shooting in Dallas. On August 31, 2016, less than 24 hours after being released from jail on charges of suspected assault with a deadly weapon, Brown released "What Would You Do?". From November 2016 through January 2017, he continued to preview unreleased material from the album sessions. Finally, on December 16, 2016, he released the second official single from the album, "Party", which features guest vocals from Usher and Gucci Mane. In February he announced that "Privacy" would be the next single, which was released on March 24, 2017. Later in April he previewed the songs "Flex On You" and "I Love Her", playing them in some club appearances.

The initial track listing of Heartbreak on a Full Moon was announced by Brown on his Instagram account on May 2, 2017, saying that it would be a double-disc album of 40 tracks, and that it would be released in June 2017. On May 11, he released an additional SoundCloud track with rapper Nas called "Die Young".

In the first days of June 2017, 46 unreleased songs by Chris Brown were leaked. The material consisted of discarded songs from his then-recent past works, demos recorded by him for other artists, and some tracks recorded during the Heartbreak album sessions, most of them unfinished. On June 7, 2017, during the red carpet interviews at the premiere of his own documentary, Welcome To My Life, Brown announced that the album's release date was postponed to mid-summer. That same month he continued previewing unreleased songs from the album sessions.

In July 2017, he announced the pending release of upcoming singles from his album. Later on August 4, 2017, he released the album's fourth single "Pills & Automobiles", which features guest vocals from Yo Gotti, A Boogie Wit Da Hoodie and Kodak Black. On August 14, 2017, he announced the release of the fifth official single, "Questions", and on August 16, he revealed the album's release date of October 31, 2017. In the run up to the album's release, on October 5, 2017, Brown unveiled the official artwork on his Instagram profile, sharing a video with a visual of a blood-dripping human heart set against a pink full moon, with a snippet of the song "Heartbreak on a Full Moon" in the background.

On October 13, 2017, Brown released the promotional single "High End", that features guest vocals from Future and Young Thug, and announced the final tracklist of the album. On October 19, the singer released three songs from the album, "Confidence", "Tempo" and "Only 4 Me", as an anticipation for the close release. On October 25, Brown organized with Tidal a free pop-up concert in New York City to perform the singles of the album. The following day, he released three more songs to anticipate the album, "Everybody Knows", "Hope You Do" and "Pull Up". A couple days before Heartbreak on a Full Moon’s release, Brown partnered with Spotify's Rap Caviar for a segment where he painted the album cover, mostly from dancing around the canvas.

Heartbreak on a Full Moon was released digitally on October 31, 2017, and onto CD three days later by RCA Records. On December 13, 2017, he released a 12-track deluxe edition called Cuffing Season – 12 Days of Christmas, containing songs left off the original album.

== Tour ==
On March 27, 2018, Chris Brown announced an official headlining concert tour to further promote the album, titled Heartbreak on a Full Moon Tour. The tour began on June 19 in Seattle, at White River Amphitheatre. The opening acts for the tour were 6lack, H.E.R., Rich the Kid, and Jacquees. The tour included 27 shows and ended on August 4, 2018 in Las Vegas, Nevada, at the T-Mobile Arena.

== Critical reception ==
Professional ratings
Review scores
Source	Rating
AllMusic	3/5 stars
HipHopDX	3.1/5

The Boombox wrote positively of the album, defining it "an ambitious effort that finds the crooner conveying feelings of heartache and betrayal", with “Chris Brown [proving] himself to be an indefatigable vessel for artistry, making Heartbreak on a Full Moon a statement project that will go down among the most ambitious albums of its time”. Qatar Tribune wrote that “Brown is man of many vibes, and though elements of his personality and style are more pronounced on one track versus another, it all sounds like him. And in the case of 'Heartbreak on a Full Moon', perhaps Brown's greatest feat is that he makes it all come together, and sound pretty good”. The Jamaica Star said that “Chris Brown sure has some nerve, releasing a 45-song album when audience attention spans are notoriously short”, commending the album's musicality: “with Heartbreak on a Full Moon, Brown performs like a one-man streaming service, and he's got hits on every channel”. Vibe listed it among the all-time "12 best hip-hop and R&B multi-disc albums". Cultural critic and media personality Joe Budden defined Heartbreak on a Full Moon as the singer's best album.

HotNewHipHop called the album "a unquestionable testament to the singer's dedication to his craft, a positive translation of his self-professed obsessive behavior". Craig Jenkins of Vulture argued that "There’s actually a decent album hidden in Chris Brown’s bewildering Heartbreak on a Full Moon", and wrote that "the album's first disc mixes peppy, dirty sex jams with moody revenge anthems that engage some of Brown's most grating tendencies as a performer, while the second reckons more humbly with depression." In a mixed review, HipHopDX writer Scott Glaysher stated: "There is no denying the technical flawlessness of his voice, but even those perfect pipes can't save the lifelessly formulaic songwriting." AllMusic editor Andy Kellman said that "the stand-outs are enough to make for a 45-minute listen that surpasses his previous album, and clearing out the tracks on which Brown's tenor slips from pleading to whining makes it easier to reach them with convenience." Kellman rounded the review off stating that the album was "artistically conservative", and that "there's depth, though it does require sifting." Renowned for Sound said: “At 2 hours 40 minutes, Chris Brown’s attempt at grandiosity winds up a bloated, mixed bag”.

=== Awards and nominations ===
Awards and nominations for Heartbreak on a Full Moon
Year	Ceremony	Category	Result	Ref.
2018	Soul Train Music Awards	Album of the Year	Nominated	

== Commercial performance ==
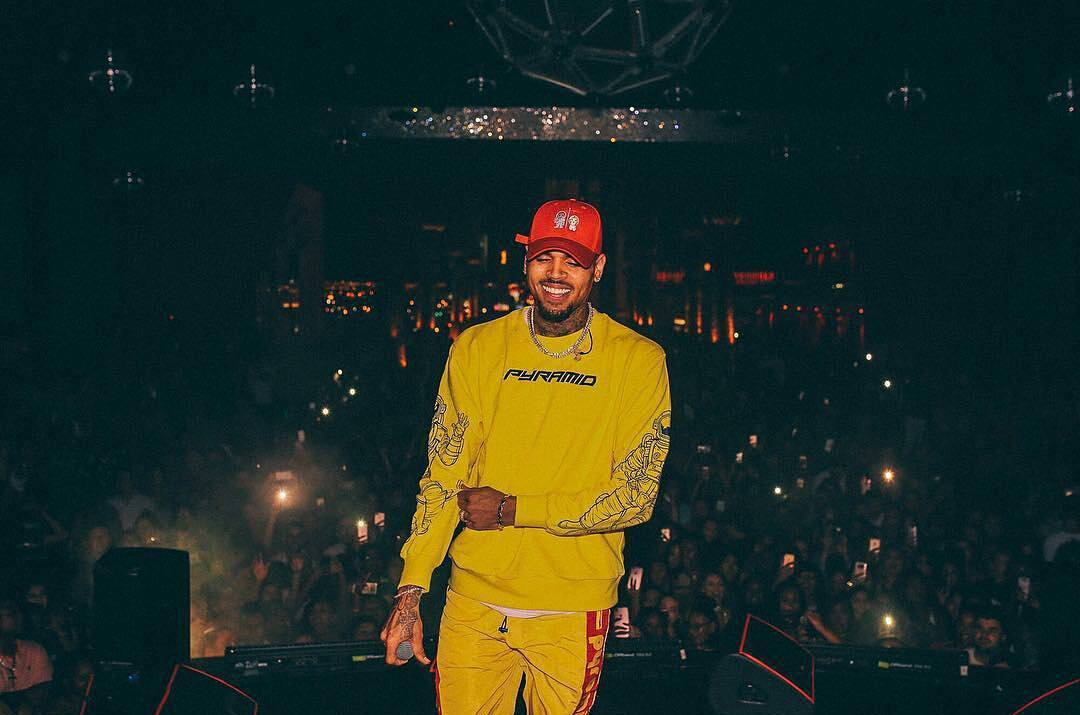
Brown performing at a nightclub in Las Vegas in July 2017.

Despite being counted for only three days of digital and streaming sales, because of its release in the middle of the chart's tracking week, Heartbreak on a Full Moon debuted at number three on the US Billboard 200, becoming Brown's ninth consecutive top 10 album on the chart, after selling 25,000 copies and earning 68,000 album-equivalent units within three days. In its second chart week, the album remained at number three on Billboard 200, with 20,000 copies and earning 73,000 album-equivalent units. The album was Brown's seventh solo album to debut at number one on the Billboard Top R&B/Hip-Hop Albums chart. On November 8, 2017, Heartbreak on a Full Moon was certified gold by the Recording Industry Association of America for combined sales and album-equivalent units of over 500,000 units in the United States. Brown became the first R&B male artist that went gold in a week since Jamie Foxx's Unpredictable in 2005. Heartbreak on a Full Moon was the thirty-sixth best-selling album of the year according to Hits, moved a total of 608,000 album-equivalent units by the end of 2017, including 80,000 pure album sales, 643,000 song sales, 695 million streams. In the next year, the album was the forty-fourth best-selling album of the year, moved a total of 618,000 album-equivalent units by the end of 2018, including 25,000 pure album sales, 240,000 song sales, 768 million streams. Heartbreak on a Full Moon became Chris Brown's Second longest-running album on the Billboard 200, spending over 90 weeks on the chart. On August 23, 2019, the album was certified double platinum by the Recording Industry Association of America (RIAA) for combined sales and album-equivalent units of over a two million units in the United States.

In Australia, it entered the ARIA Albums Chart at number five, becoming his first top ten in the nation since X in 2014.

In the United Kingdom, the album debuted at number 10 on the UK Albums Chart, Brown's sixth non-consecutive top 10 album on the chart. The album was eventually certified Gold by the British Phonographic Industry (BPI) for sales of over 100,000 copies in the UK.

In New Zealand, the album debuted at number three on the RMNZ Albums Chart, giving Brown his seventh top ten album on the chart. Until June 2018, the album has accumulated over 3 billion streams worldwide.

== Track listing ==
Production credits were adapted from RCA's official website.

Disc 1
No.	Title	Writer(s)	Producer(s)	Length
1.	"Lost & Found"	Christopher Brown	J-Bo; Xeryus G.^{[a]}; David Nakaji^{[b]}; Ben Milchev^{[b]}	4:01
2.	"Privacy"	Brown	D. A. Doman; Jim Stewart^{[b]}; Pigliapoco^{[b]}	3:40
3.	"Juicy Booty" (featuring Jhené Aiko and R. Kelly)	Brown; Jhené Chilombo; Robert Kelly	Polow da Don; Chu; DJ Buddha	4:33
4.	"Questions"	Brown; Floyd Bentley III; Prince Chrishan; Melvin Moore; Lyrica Anderson; Bobby Turner Jr.	Pip Kembo; B Ham; A1	2:09
5.	"Heartbreak on a Full Moon"	Brown	Don City; Beck	4:06
6.	"Roses"	Brown; Chrishan; Turner, Jr.; Moore	ISM; A1	3:24
7.	"Confidence"	Brown; Gabrielle Nowee	Soundz; Cardiak; Hitmaka; A1	2:57
8.	"Rock Your Body"	Brown	TBHits; Foster	2:42
9.	"Tempo"	Brown	Sean Momberger; Pigliapoco^{[b]}	3:38
10.	"Handle It" (featuring Dej Loaf and Lil Yachty)	Brown; Steve Thornton; Deja Trimble; Miles McCollum	Swiff D; Patrizio Pigliapoco^{[b]}	4:41
11.	"Sip"	Brown; Turner Jr.	Chrishan; Txpski; A1	3:17
12.	"Everybody Knows"	Brown	Tariq Beats; Cabbin	3:08
13.	"To My Bed"	Brown; Ellery McKinney	Ayo; Keyz; EY	4:33
14.	"Hope You Do"	Brown; Chrishan	ISM; A1	4:41
15.	"This Ain't"	Brown; Chrishan; Anderson	Foreign Teck; OZ; Tariq Beats	2:58
16.	"Pull Up"	Brown; Nija Charles; Turner Jr.	A1; Tariq Beats	2:22
17.	"Party" (featuring Usher and Gucci Mane)	Brown; Turner Jr.; Radric Davis; Usher Raymond; Symere Woods	ISM; Prince Chrishan; A1^{[a]}	3:40
18.	"Sensei" (featuring A1)	Brown; Bentley III	OG Parker; Deko; A1^{[a]}; Pigliapoco^{[b]}	2:36
19.	"Summer Breeze"	Brown; Anderson; Ramsahoye; Turner Jr.	Prince Chrishan; Txpski; A1	4:00
20.	"No Exit"	Brown	Don City; Beck	3:20
21.	"Pills & Automobiles" (featuring Yo Gotti, A Boogie wit da Hoodie, and Kodak Black)	Brown; Mario Mims; Julius Dubose; Dieuson Octave	OG Parker; Smash David; The Martianz	4:52
22.	"Hurt the Same"	Brown	D. A. Doman; Jim Stewart^{[b]}; Pigliapoco^{[b]}	3:29
Total length:				78:47

Disc 2
No.	Title	Writer(s)	Producer(s)	Length
1.	"I Love Her"	Brown	Amadeus; Trilogy	2:18
2.	"You Like"	Brown; Sevyn Streeter	Amadeus; Chizzy; B Ham	2:26
3.	"Nowhere"	Brown	Mel & Mus	3:13
4.	"Other Niggas"	Brown; Benton Harbor	Foreign Teck; Vontae Thomas; Cratos^{[b]}; Pigliapoco^{[b]}	2:59
5.	"Tough Love"	Brown	Boi-1da; Frank Dukes^{[a]}; J-Louis^{[a]}; Sevn Thomas^{[b]}; Syk Sense^{[b]}	4:04
6.	"Paradise"	Brown	Cam Wallace; Pigliapoco^{[b]}	3:49
7.	"Covered in You"	Brown	Ayo; Keyz; P2J	3:22
8.	"Even"	Brown; Julian Ray; Yoftahe Zewdu	Laney Stewart	3:59
9.	"High End" (featuring Future and Young Thug)	Brown; Nayvadius Wilburn; Jeffrey Williams	Richie Souf	3:22
10.	"On Me"	Brown	Amadeus; The Breed; Pigliapoco^{[b]}	2:32
11.	"Tell Me What to Do"	Brown	D. A. Doman; Pigliapoco^{[b]}	3:26
12.	"Frustrated"	Brown	ADP; Daecolm Holland	3:14
13.	"Enemy"	Brown; Milton Adams II	Scott Storch; Diego Ave^{[a]}	3:46
14.	"If You're Down"	Brown; Bentley III	ADP; Scribz; Daecolm Holland^{[b]}	3:21
15.	"Bite My Tongue"	Brown; Anderson; Turner Jr.	Daecolm Holland; Moon Willis	2:58
16.	"Run Away"	Brown; Chrishan; Turner Jr.	Dre Moon; A1	4:10
17.	"This Way"	Brown	JMike; T-Collar	4:02
18.	"Yellow Tape"	Brown	Amadeus; Velocity Music; Pigliapoco^{[b]}	4:41
Total length:				61:42

Heartbreak on a Full Moon (bonus tracks)
No.	Title	Writer(s)	Producer(s)	Length
19.	"Reddi Wip"	Brown; Chrishan; Turner Jr.	Jordan Evans; Matthew Burnett; Jandre Amos^{[a]}	4:28
20.	"Hangover"	Brown	Amadeus; The Breed	2:46
21.	"Emotions"	Brown; Chrishan; Moore	Billboard	2:22
22.	"Only 4 Me" (featuring Ty Dolla Sign and Verse Simmonds)	Brown; Maurice Simmonds; Tyrone Griffin, Jr.	Danja; Qkauztion; Verse Simmonds	5:07
23.	"Grass Ain't Greener"	Brown; Chrishan	Nikhil	3:21
Total length:				79:46

Deluxe edition (Cuffing Season – 12 Days of Christmas) bonus tracks
No.	Title	Writer(s)	Producer(s)	Length
1.	"Don't Slow Me Down"	Brown; Bentley III	Cardiak; Hitmaka	2:32
2.	"On Purpose" (featuring Agnez Mo)	Brown; Agnes Muljoto	Bell	2:47
3.	"Hands Up"	Brown; Jawan Shelton	Beazy Tymes; Charlie Handsome	2:27
4.	"Same Shit"	Brown	Foreign Teck; Cardiak; Rance	4:09
5.	"Trust Me"	Brown	Amadeus; Velocity Music; Dr. O^{[c]}; Pigliapoco^{[b]}	3:26
6.	"Let Shit Go"	Brown; John McGee	OG Parker; SK; Xeryus G	2:56
7.	"I Wanna"	Brown; Moore	A1	2:35
8.	"Water"	Brown; Paulo Rodriguez; Toni Romiti	P-Lo; Geoffro Cause	4:07
9.	"Yoppa" (featuring Trippie Redd)	Brown; Michael Lamar White IV	Amadeus; Velocity Music; Dr. O^{[c]}; Pigliapoco^{[b]}	3:03
10.	"Get Off"	Brown	Amadeus; Chizzy; B Ham; Pigliapoco^{[b]}	3:16
11.	"This X-Mas" (featuring Ella Mai)	Brown; Owens; Foye III; Charles Hinshaw Jr.	DJ Mustard; Ayo^{[a]}; Keyz^{[a]}	4:09
12.	"Secret" (featuring Solo Lucci)	Brown; Michael Dorsey	Amadeus; Velocity Music; Dr. O^{[c]}; Pigliapoco^{[b]}	3:55
Total length:				39:22

Notes

- ^{^[a]} signifies a co-producer
- ^{^[b]} signifies an additional producer
- ^{^[c]} signifies an uncredited co-producer

Sample credits

- "Privacy" contains an interpolation of "Tight Up Skirt", performed by Red Rat.
- "Juicy Booty" samples "Cutie Pie", performed by One Way, and contains an interpolation of "California Love (Remix)" performed by Tupac Shakur, Dr. Dre and Roger Troutman.
- "Questions" contains an interpolation of "Turn Me On", performed by Kevin Lyttle.
- "To My Bed" contains an interpolation of "Nice & Slow", performed by Usher.
- "Hope You Do" samples "Where I Wanna Be", performed by Donell Jones.
- "Even" contains an interpolation of "Remember the Time", performed by Michael Jackson.
- "Frustrated" contains an interpolation of "Brazilian Rhyme (Beijo Interlude)", performed by Earth, Wind & Fire.
- "This Way" contains an interpolation of "Rosa Parks", performed by Outkast.

== Charts ==
=== Weekly charts ===
Weekly chart performance for Heartbreak on a Full Moon
Chart (2017)	Peak position
Australian Albums (ARIA)	5
Australian Urban Albums (ARIA)	1
Austrian Albums (Ö3 Austria)	73
Belgian Albums (Ultratop Flanders)	38
Belgian Albums (Ultratop Wallonia)	73
Canadian Albums (Billboard)	10
Danish Albums (Hitlisten)	23
Dutch Albums (Album Top 100)	15
Finnish Albums (Suomen virallinen lista)	50
French Albums (SNEP)	29
German Albums (Offizielle Top 100)	35
Irish Albums (IRMA)	18
Italian Albums (FIMI)	78
Japanese Albums (Oricon)	45
Japanese Digital Albums (Oricon)	17
Japanese Download Albums (Billboard Japan)	17
Japanese Hot Albums (Billboard Japan)	52
New Zealand Albums (RMNZ)	3
Norwegian Albums (VG-lista)	21
Portuguese Albums (AFP)	39
Scottish Albums (Official Charts)	33
South Korean Albums (Circle)	57
Swiss Albums (Schweizer Hitparade)	29
UK Albums (Official Charts)	10
UK R&B Albums (Official Charts)	1
US Billboard 200	3
US Top R&B/Hip-Hop Albums (Billboard)	1

=== Year-end charts ===
2017 year-end chart performance for Heartbreak on a Full Moon
Chart (2017)	Position
Australian Urban Albums (ARIA)	25
US Top R&B/Hip-Hop Albums (Billboard)	70

2018 year-end chart performance for Heartbreak on a Full Moon
Chart (2018)	Position
Australian Albums (ARIA)	82
Australian Urban Albums (ARIA)	27
New Zealand Albums (RMNZ)	31
US Billboard 200	28
US Top R&B/Hip-Hop Albums (Billboard)	18

2019 year-end chart performance for Heartbreak on a Full Moon
Chart (2019)	Position
Australian Urban Albums (ARIA)	43
US Billboard 200	175

== Certifications ==
Certifications for Heartbreak on a Full Moon
Region	Certification	Certified units/sales
Australia (ARIA)	Platinum	70,000^{‡}
Canada (Music Canada)	Platinum	80,000^{‡}
Denmark (IFPI Danmark)	Gold	10,000^{‡}
France (SNEP)	Gold	50,000^{‡}
New Zealand (RMNZ)	3× Platinum	45,000^{‡}
South Africa (RISA)	Gold	25,000^{‡}
United Kingdom (BPI)	Gold	100,000^{‡}
United States (RIAA)	2× Platinum	2,000,000^{‡}
^{‡} Sales+streaming figures based on certification alone.

== Release history ==
Release dates and formats for Heartbreak on a Full Moon
Region	Date	Label(s)	Edition(s)	Format(s)	Ref.
Various	October 31, 2017	RCA; CBE	Standard; deluxe	Digital download; streaming	
Various	November 3, 2017	RCA; CBE	Standard; deluxe	CD	
Various	December 13, 2017	RCA; CBE	Digital download; streaming	Cuffing Season – 12 Days of Christmas	

== See also ==
- List of Billboard number-one R&B/hip-hop albums of 2017
- List of Billboard number-one R&B/hip-hop albums of 2018
- List of UK R&B Albums Chart number ones of 2017
