= Privacy (song) =

Single by Chris Brown

from the album Heartbreak on a Full Moon
- Released: March 24, 2017
- Recorded: December 31, 2016
- Studio: Platinum Sound Recording Studios, New York City
- Length: 3:40
- Label: RCA
- Songwriter: Brown
- Producers: D. A. Doman; Jim Stewart

Chris Brown singles chronology
"Bruk Off Yuh Back" (2017)	"Privacy" (2017)	"Jiu Jitsu" (2017)

Music video
- "Privacy" on YouTube

"Privacy" is a song by the American singer Chris Brown from his eighth album, Heartbreak on a Full Moon. It was released by RCA Records as the third single from the album on March 24, 2017. The song was written by Brown and produced by David Doman with Jim Stewart.

"Privacy" achieved commercial success in English-speaking countries, being certified double Platinum by the Recording Industry Association of America (RIAA), Platinum by Australian Recording Industry Association (ARIA), and Gold by the British Phonographic Industry (BPI).

Its music video was shot in Los Angeles on March 27, 2017, and released on April 14, 2017.

== Background and recording ==
The song was made at Platinum Sound Recording Studios, in New York City the night of New Year's Eve 2016, minutes before the dropping of the ball. According to the song's recording engineer, Patrizio Pigliapoco, the making of the song took less than half an hour.

On January 4, 2017, Brown previewed two snippets on his Instagram profile from the songs "Privacy" and "Tell Me What to Do", that were unreleased songs planned to be on his upcoming eighth studio album, Heartbreak on a Full Moon. On January 10, 2017, Brown posted a video of himself and rapper Casanova dancing to "Privacy" in his recording studio. The single was released on March 24, 2017, after being premiered on SoundCloud the same day.

== Composition ==
"Privacy" was written by Brown, and produced by David Doman, with additional production done by keyboard player Jim Stewart. The lyrics talk about how Brown can't wait to be alone with his lady in the bedroom, and about spending the night with her in a sexually explicit way. The song contains an interpolation of the 1990s dancehall song "Tight Up Skirt" by Red Rat in the first part of the chorus.

== Music video ==
On March 24, 2017, Brown uploaded the audio for "Privacy" on his YouTube and Vevo account. The music video for the song was directed by Brown and shot in Los Angeles on March 27, 2017. The music video was released on April 14, 2017 on Vevo.

=== Synopsis ===
The neon-colored, dance-filled music video starts off in a Casino where Brown is walking and performing stylized dance moves on the tables, then entering an elevator, a lady catches his eye. Once following her into a room, he is transported on the stage with other superpower like dancers. At the end Brown is transported back to that hotel elevator. This time, he walks out with the girl he had been searching for, holding hands, and looking at the camera with a knowing smile.

== Live performances ==
Chris Brown performed the track during 2017 Bet Awards, and also during a charity concert organized by Tidal, and during a free pop-up concert in New York City some days before the dropping of his album Heartbreak on a Full Moon.

== Track listing ==
- Digital download
1. "Privacy" – 3:40

== Credits and personnel ==
Credits adapted from Tidal.

- Chris Brown – vocals, composer
- d.a. doman – producer, composer
- Patrizio Pigliapoco – recording engineer
- Jim Stewart – composer
- Tom Coyne – mastering engineer
- Jaycen Joshua – mixing engineer

== Charts ==
=== Weekly charts ===
Weekly chart performance for "Privacy"
Chart (2017)	Peak position
Australia (ARIA)	61
Australia Urban (ARIA)	7
France (SNEP)	73
New Zealand Heatseekers (RMNZ)	4
Scottish Singles Sales (Official Charts)	44
Switzerland (Schweizer Hitparade)	95
UK Singles (Official Charts)	86
UK Hip Hop/R&B (Official Charts)	26
US Billboard Hot 100	62
US Hot R&B/Hip-Hop Songs (Billboard)	26
US R&B/Hip-Hop Airplay (Billboard)	8
US Rhythmic Airplay (Billboard)	16

=== Year-end charts ===
2017 year-end chart performance for "Privacy"
Chart (2017)	Position
US Hot R&B/Hip-Hop Songs (Billboard)	66
US R&B/Hip-Hop Airplay (Billboard)	34

== Certifications ==
Certifications for "Privacy"
Region	Certification	Certified units/sales
Australia (ARIA)	Platinum	70,000^{‡}
New Zealand (RMNZ)	2× Platinum	60,000^{‡}
United Kingdom (BPI)	Gold	400,000^{‡}
United States (RIAA)	3× Platinum	3,000,000^{‡}
^{‡} Sales+streaming figures based on certification alone.
