= Questions (Chris Brown song) =

Single by Chris Brown

from the album Heartbreak on a Full Moon
- Released: August 16, 2017
- Recorded: 2016
- Studio: Paramount (Los Angeles, California)
- Genre: Dancehall; dancehall pop
- Length: 2:09
- Label: RCA
- Songwriters: Chris Brown; Christopher Dotson; Melvin Moore; Brandon Hamlin; Philip Kembo; Floyd Bentley; Bobby Turner, Jr.
- Producers: Pip Kembo; B HAM; A1

Chris Brown singles chronology
"Pills & Automobiles" (2017)	"Questions" (2017)	"Either Way" (2017)

Music video
- "Questions" on YouTube

"Questions" is a song by American singer Chris Brown from his eighth studio album, Heartbreak on a Full Moon (2017). It was released by RCA Records as the fifth single from the album on August 16, 2017.

The song is a dancehall track, based on an interpolation of Vincentian soca singer Kevin Lyttle’s 2003 single "Turn Me On". It was written by Brown, Christopher Dotson, Melvin Moore and Bobby Turner Jr., while its production was handled by Pip Kembo, B HAM and Floyd "A1" Bentley. The single was commercially successful worldwide, being certified gold in Canada, New Zealand, Denmark and Switzerland, and platinum in Australia, United Kingdom and United States. A music video for the song was released on August 16, 2017. The clip shows Brown and a group of ladies execute dancing coreographies in colorful scenarios.

== Background and release ==
In September 2016, in a then deleted video from his Instagram account, Brown previewed some sections of the song whilst painting in his house. Fans speculated that the song was a cover of Kevin Lyttle's 2003 single "Turn Me On".

In July 2017, he announced the pending release of upcoming singles from his album Heartbreak on a Full Moon. Later on August 4, 2017, he released "Pills & Automobiles", that features guest vocals from American trap artists Yo Gotti, A Boogie wit da Hoodie and Kodak Black, then on August 14, 2017, he announced the release date of the fifth official single from the album for August 16, which was "Questions". The song leaked online a week before its actual release, though, with iTunes versions appearing online on August 11, it's believed that the track was prematurely released onto iTunes in select countries before being taken down. With these versions, the cover art was simply a black picture.

== Composition ==
"Questions" is an uptempo dancehall song featuring pop and R&B influences, with a "bouncy" island beat produced by A1 Bentley, Pip Kembo and B HAM. The song is based on an interpolation of Kevin Lyttle’s 2003 hit song "Turn Me On". In the song Brown asks to a girl that catches his eye if he could take her home for the night.

== Music video ==
On August 16, 2017, Brown uploaded the music video for "Questions" on his YouTube and Vevo account. Amy Sciarretto of PopCrush described the video as a clip "immersed in colorful scenarios where Brown showcases his dancing skills".

== Track listing ==
- Digital download
1. "Questions" – 2:09

== Charts ==
=== Weekly charts ===
Weekly chart performance for "Questions"
Chart (2017)	Peak position
Australia (ARIA)	56
Belgium (Ultratip Bubbling Under Flanders)	24
Belgium (Ultratip Bubbling Under Wallonia)	13
Canada Hot 100 (Billboard)	53
Czech Republic Singles Digital (ČNS IFPI)	100
France (SNEP)	138
Germany (GfK)	74
Ireland (IRMA)	37
Lebanon (Lebanese Top 20)	15
Netherlands (Dutch Top 40 Tipparade)	1
Netherlands (Single Top 100)	43
New Zealand (Recorded Music NZ)	33
Portugal (AFP)	69
Scottish Singles Sales (Official Charts)	32
Slovakia Singles Digital (ČNS IFPI)	79
Sweden (Sverigetopplistan)	40
Switzerland (Schweizer Hitparade)	55
UK Singles (Official Charts)	12
UK Hip Hop/R&B (Official Charts)	3
US Billboard Hot 100	78
US Hot R&B/Hip-Hop Songs (Billboard)	32
US R&B/Hip-Hop Airplay (Billboard)	45
US Rhythmic Airplay (Billboard)	8

=== Year-end charts ===
2017 year-end chart performance for "Questions"
Chart (2017)	Position
US Hot R&B/Hip-Hop Songs (Billboard)	98

== Certifications ==
Certifications for "Questions"
Region	Certification	Certified units/sales
Australia (ARIA)	Platinum	70,000^{‡}
Canada (Music Canada)	Gold	40,000^{‡}
Denmark (IFPI Danmark)	Gold	45,000^{‡}
Germany (BVMI)	Gold	200,000^{‡}
New Zealand (RMNZ)	2× Platinum	60,000^{‡}
Switzerland (IFPI Switzerland)	Gold	10,000^{‡}
United Kingdom (BPI)	Platinum	600,000^{‡}
United States (RIAA)	Platinum	1,000,000^{‡}
^{‡} Sales+streaming figures based on certification alone.
