= High End =

2017 song by Chris Brown featuring Future and Young Thug

Promotional single by Chris Brown featuring Future and Young Thug

from the album Heartbreak on a Full Moon
- Released: October 13, 2017
- Recorded: 2017
- Genre: Hip hop; trap
- Length: 3:22
- Label: RCA
- Songwriters: Chris Brown, Nayvadius Wilburn, Jeffery Lamar Williams
- Producer: Richie Souf

Music video
- "High End" on YouTube

"High End" is a song by American singer Chris Brown featuring American rappers Future and Young Thug. It was released on October 13, 2017 by RCA Records, as a promotional single from Chris Brown's eight studio album Heartbreak on a Full Moon.

== Background ==
Chris Brown announced a collaboration with Future and Young Thug for a new song. Chris Brown released the song on October 11, 2017. The next day he already released the music video. In "High End", which is a hip hop song, the lyrics talk about the luxury life of the artists. In the song each artist does their verse, and no one claim the hook together.

Brown said that the song was written for the collaborative mixtape by Future and Young Thug, Super Slimey, but Brown asked them for permission to put it on his own album Heartbreak on a Full Moon, because it fit the album's concept.

== Music video ==
The music video was released a day before the original release of the single. The video was directed by Chris Brown and Spiff TV, features cameos from American artists Teyana Taylor, Fabolous and Trey Songz. It shows Future arriving in a nightclub where he begins to dance alongside humans and monsters. Chris appears as a vampire with red eyes who begins to dance. Young Thug appears as a creature with white eyes, in a room surrounded by girls, and later he joins the party.

== Credits and personnel ==
Credits adapted from Tidal.

- Chris Brown – vocals, lyrics, composer
- Future - vocals, lyrics, composer
- Young Thug - vocals, lyrics, composer
- Tony Son – lyrics, composer
- Richie Souf - producer
- Ivan Jimenez - assistant engineer
- David Nakaji - assistant engineer
- Patrizio Pigliapoco – recording engineer
- Tom Coyne – mastering engineer
- Jaycen Joshua – mixing engineer

== Charts ==
Chart performance for "High End"
Chart (2017)	Peak position
Canada Hot 100 (Billboard)	57
France (SNEP)	93
Switzerland (Schweizer Hitparade)	78
UK Singles (Official Charts)	71
UK Hip Hop/R&B (Official Charts)	33
US Billboard Hot 100	82
US Hot R&B/Hip-Hop Songs (Billboard)	32

== Certifications ==
Certifications for "High End"
Region	Certification	Certified units/sales
United States (RIAA)	Gold	500,000^{‡}
^{‡} Sales+streaming figures based on certification alone.
