= Lyrica Anderson =

American singer and songwriter

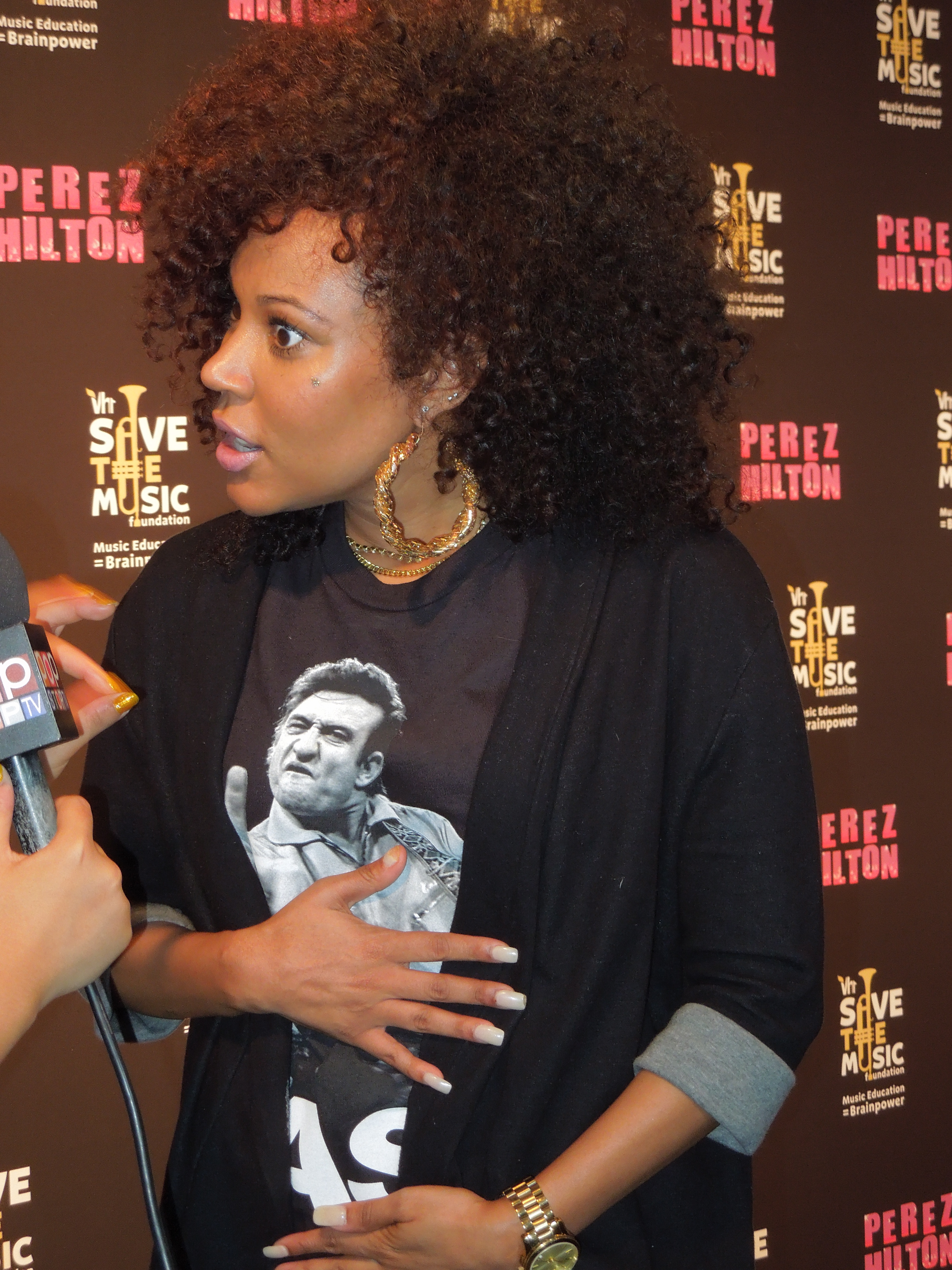
- Anderson in 2012

Background information
- Born: Los Angeles, California
- Genres: R&B, soul, pop, hip hop
- Occupations: Singer, songwriter, rapper, producer, actress
- Instrument: Vocals
- Years active: 2008–present
- Labels: Mosley, Interscope, EMPIRE
- Website: www.iamlyrica.com

Lyrica Nasha Anderson is an American R&B singer and songwriter. She is the daughter of singer and former Ikette Lyrica Garrett. Anderson has appeared on the VH1 reality show Love & Hip Hop: Hollywood.

== Career ==
In 2009, Anderson co-wrote the song "Pyramid" for Filipina singer Charice with R&B singer Iyaz, which was released in 2010 and peaked at number one on the US Dance Club Songs chart. Anderson has writing credits on two songs on Demi Lovato's third studio album, Unbroken (2011); "All Night Long" featuring Missy Elliott and Timbaland and "Together" featuring Jason Derulo.

In September 2012, Anderson released her debut mixtape entitled King Me. In 2013, she was released from her deal with Timbaland's record label Mosley Music Group, a division of Interscope Records. In the same year she co-wrote the song "Jealous" for Beyoncé's fifth studio album. In May 2014, she released her debut extended play, King Me 2, featuring guest appearances from Ty Dolla $ign, Kevin Gates and Wiz Khalifa. In 2014, Anderson also co-wrote the song "Pretend" for singer Tinashe. She also co-wrote the song grass ain't greener recorded by Chris Brown

In October 2015, Anderson released her debut studio album, Hello. In 2016, she became a supporting cast member of the third season on VH1's Love & Hip Hop: Hollywood. In 2017, she returned as a main cast member of the reality series.

== Discography ==
=== Studio albums ===
- Hello (2015)
- Adia (2017)
- Bad Hair Day (2020)

=== EPs ===
- King Me 2 (2014)
- Nasha Pearl (2017)
- Strength (2018)

=== Mixtape ===
- King Me (2012)

=== Singles ===
- "Unf*** You" by Lyrica Anderson (featuring Ty Dolla $ign) from King Me 2 (2013)
- "Freakin" by Lyrica Anderson (featuring Wiz Khalifa) from King Me 2 (2014)
- "Freakin Remix" by Lyrica Anderson (featuring Wiz Khalifa and Eric Bellinger) from King Me 2 (2014)
- "Hashtag" by Lyrica Anderson (2015)
- "Don't Take It Personal" by Lyrica Anderson (2017)
- "Marriott" by Lyrica Anderson (2020)
- "Act a Fool" by Lyrica Anderson (2020)

=== Other appearances ===
Title	Artist	Album
"Daddy's Little Girl"	The Knux	Remind Me in 3 Days...
"Mentally"	Timbaland	Timbaland Thursdays
"Little Drummer Boy"	Timbaland	Western Union Singing Telegram
"Gotta Be Love"	Armin Van Buuren	Embrace
"The Game"	Ya Boy	Road 2 Rocka
"Where Did the Love Go" (featuring Afrojack)	Chico Rose	Non-album single

=== Songwriting credits ===
Year	Artist	Album	Title(s)
2007	Mýa	Liberation	"Walka Not a Talka" (featuring Snoop Dogg)
2007	Keke Palmer	So Uncool	"Footwurking"
2008	Webbie	Savage Life 2	"I Miss You" (featuring LeToya Luckett)
2009	Jeanette	Undress to the Beat	"Freak Out"
2010	Charice	Charice	"Pyramid" (featuring Iyaz)
2010	Hannah Montana	Hannah Montana Forever	"Are You Ready"
2010	Various Artists	Camp Rock 2: The Final Jam	"Fire" performed by Matthew "Mdot" Finley. Written by Anderson and Dapo Torimiro.
2010	Various Artists	Camp Rock 2: The Final Jam	"It's On" performed by the film's cast. Written by Anderson, Toby Gad and Kovasciar Myvette.
2010	Various Artists	Camp Rock 2: The Final Jam	"Tear It Down" performed by Matthew "Mdot" Finley and Meaghan Jette Martin. Written by Anderson, Toby Gad and Kovasciar Myvette.
2010	Various Artists	Camp Rock 2: The Final Jam	"Walking' In My Shoes" (bonus track) performed by Matthew "Mdot" Finley and Meaghan Jette Martin.
2011	Demi Lovato	Unbroken	"All Night Long" (featuring Missy Elliott and Timbaland)
2011	Demi Lovato	Unbroken	"Together" (featuring Jason Derulo)
2011	The Knux	Eraser	"1974" (featuring Natalia Kills)
2012	Elijah Blake	Bijoux 22	"X.O.X" (featuring Common)
2012	BoA	Only One	"One Dream (featuring Henry of Super Junior-M and Key of SHINee)
2013	Beyoncé	Beyoncé	"Jealous"
2014	Jennifer Hudson	JHUD	"Walk It Out" (featuring Timbaland)
2014	Tinashe	Aquarius	"Pretend" (featuring ASAP Rocky)
2014	Blonde	Non-album single	"I Loved You" (featuring Melissa Steel)
2015	Elijah Blake	Shadows & Diamonds	"I Just Wanna..."
2015	Jason Derulo	Everything Is 4	"Love Like That" (featuring K. Michelle)
2015	Chris Brown	Royalty	"Wrist" (featuring Solo Lucci)
2015	Chris Brown	Royalty	"Little Bit"
2017	Ty Dolla $ign	Beach House 3	"All the Time"
2017	Chris Brown	Heartbreak on a Full Moon	"Questions"
2017	Chris Brown	Heartbreak on a Full Moon	"Party" (featuring Usher and Gucci Mane)
2017	Omarion	Non-album single	"Distance"
2019	Chris Brown	Indigo	"Cheetah"
2019	Chris Brown	Indigo	"Part of the Plan"
2019	Chris Brown	Indigo	"You Like That"

== Filmography ==
=== Television ===
Year	Title	Role	Notes
2016–2019	Love & Hip Hop: Hollywood	Herself	Supporting Cast (season 3); Main Cast (seasons 4–6)
2020	The Conversation	Herself	2 episodes
2022–2023	Family Reunion: Love & Hip Hop Edition	Herself	Main cast (season 3)

=== Actress ===
Year	Title	Role	Notes
2023	No Way Out	Lynette	
2023	Forever Us	Kate Harris	
2026	Unrequited	Detective Shaw	
