= Before the Trap: Nights in Tarzana =

Before The Trap: Nights In Tarzana

Mixtape by Chris Brown, OHB
- Released: April 29, 2016
- Recorded: 2015–16
- Genres: Hip hop; R&B; trap
- Length: 77:40
- Label: CBE

Chris Brown, OHB chronology
| Royalty (2015) | Before The Trap: Nights In Tarzana (2016) | Heartbreak on a Full Moon (2017) |

Before the Trap: Nights in Tarzana is the seventh mixtape by American recording artist Chris Brown in collaboration with his OHB group; it was released on April 29, 2016, on DatPiff for free. The mixtape contains appearances from rappers of his OHB collective and others, such as Hoody Baby, Young Blacc, Young Lo, Dee Cosey, Kevin Gates, Tyga, Section Boyz, Quavo, Gangsta Robb, Keeis Stackz, Tracy T, Ryan Toby, Lyrica, Young Thug, and Jeezy.

The mixtape was re-released as a commercial mixtape exclusively on the streaming platforms Tidal and Amazon Music on July 2, 2018, with a different tracklist, excluding the songs "TrapHouse Blues", "Like I Done It Before" and "Rumorz", adding to it numerous songs from the collaborative mixtape Attack the Block by Brown, OHB and Section Boyz also released in 2016.

== Background ==
The mixtape was announced on April 27 by Brown on Twitter, later announcing his European One Hell of a Nite Tour, the documentary Welcome to My Life, and the publication of his single "Grass Ain't Greener".

== Composition ==
Musically, the 19-track tape sound has been described as mainly a darker trap sound, with poppy, DJ Mustard-esque songs to some mid-tempo R&B love songs that fill the in-between, with Chris Brown performances that vary from mainly his rapping to his singing.

== Commercial performance ==
The mixtape on DatPiff was certified platinum by the site's standards, reaching over 300,000 downloads and over 1,600,000 full listens.

== Track listing ==
| No. | Title | Length |
|---|---|---|
| 1. | "Shut Down" (featuring Hoody Baby, Young Blacc, Young Lo, Dee Cosey) | 5:22 |
| 2. | "Whippin'" (featuring Section Boyz, Quavo) | 7:00 |
| 3. | "Socialize" (featuring Young Blacc, Young Lo, Kevin Gates) | 4:31 |
| 4. | "I Need Love" (featuring Hoody Baby, Young Blacc) | 4:07 |
| 5. | "Party Next Door" (featuring Young Blacc) | 3:51 |
| 6. | "Side Piece" | 3:34 |
| 7. | "Freed Up" | 3:29 |
| 8. | "Big Dreams" (Hoody Baby featuring Gangsta Robb) | 3:49 |
| 9. | "Roller Coaster" (featuring Keeis Stackz, Hoody Baby, Tracy T) | 3:45 |
| 10. | "Like I Done It Before" (Young Lo) | 4:24 |
| 11. | "Actin Like This" (featuring Dee Cosey) | 3:51 |
| 12. | "Love Gon Go" (featuring Ryan Toby) | 4:13 |
| 13. | "TrapHouse Blues" (Hoody Baby) | 3:26 |
| 14. | "I Lean" (featuring Tracy T, Hoody Baby) | 3:17 |
| 15. | "Save The Drama" (featuring Tracy T, Kevin Gates) | 3:47 |
| 16. | "Faded To Sade Remix" (Lyrica featuring Chris Brown) | 3:47 |
| 17. | "Wrist Remix" (featuring Young Thug, Jeezy) | 3:15 |
| 18. | "Rumorz" (Tyga featuring Chris Brown) | 3:24 |
| 19. | "Substance" (featuring Hoody Baby, Tracy T, Young LO) | 4:11 |
| Total length: | | 01:17:40 |

Sample credits

- "Rumorz" samples "Rumors by Timex Social Club
