= Party (Chris Brown song) =

Single by Chris Brown featuring Usher and Gucci Mane

from the album Heartbreak on a Full Moon
- Released: December 16, 2016
- Recorded: 2016
- Genre: Hip hop; R&B
- Length: 3:40
- Label: RCA
- Songwriters: Christopher Brown; Floyd Bentley; Ishmael Montague; Melvin Moore; Lyrica Anderson; Bobby Joseph Turner, Jr.; Radric Davis; Usher Raymond; Barry Bradford
- Producers: A1; ISM; Hitmaka

Chris Brown singles chronology
"Do You Mind" (2016)	"Party" (2016)	"I Think of You" (2017)

Usher singles chronology
"Rivals" (2016)	"Party" (2016)	"LaLaLa" (2019)

Gucci Mane singles chronology
"Stutter" (2016)	"Party" (2016)	"Good Drank" (2017)

Music video
- "Party" on YouTube

"Party" is a song by American singer Chris Brown featuring fellow American singer Usher and American rapper Gucci Mane. It was released by RCA as the second single from the former's eighth studio album, Heartbreak on a Full Moon (2017) on December 16, 2016. "Party" was the only top 40 hit from the album, peaking at number 40 on the Billboard Hot 100.

== Music video ==
The music video for "Party" was directed by Chris Brown alongside Riveting Entertainment, and made available on December 18, 2016 on iTunes, YouTube, and VEVO. It features cameo appearances from Internet viral video stars Kida the Great and Ayo & Teo with other young dancers. The video begins with Brown entering an underground club. To gain entry he begins to dance to the song "Kriss Kross" with a group of kids surrounding him in a circle. Afterwards, "Party" begins with Chris Brown performing alongside backup dancers and kids. Usher then appears, flashing his NBA Championship ring he won as a minority owner of the Cleveland Cavaliers and slides down an escalator to begin dancing. Gucci Mane performs his verse with a group of kids surrounding him dancing.

== Promotion ==
Chris Brown, along with Gucci Mane, performed the track during the BET Awards 2017.

== Credits and personnel ==
Credits adapted from Tidal.

- Chris Brown – vocals, composer
- Usher Raymond IV – vocals, composer
- Gucci Mane – vocals, composer
- Lyrica Anderson – composer
- Ishmael Sadiq Montague – composer
- Melvin Moore – composer
- Floyd Bentley – composer
- Christopher Dotson – composer
- Jaycen Joshua – mixing engineer
- Patrizio Pigliapoco – recording engineer

== Charts ==
=== Weekly charts ===
Weekly chart performance for "Party"
Chart (2016–17)	Peak position
Australia (ARIA)	82
Australia Urban (ARIA)	11
Canada Hot 100 (Billboard)	50
France (SNEP)	84
Netherlands (Single Tip)	17
New Zealand Heatseekers (RMNZ)	1
Russia (Airplay)	197
Scottish Singles Sales (Official Charts)	46
UK Singles (Official Charts)	68
UK Hip Hop/R&B (Official Charts)	7
US Billboard Hot 100	40
US Hot R&B/Hip-Hop Songs (Billboard)	14
US R&B/Hip-Hop Airplay (Billboard)	4
US Rhythmic Airplay (Billboard)	2

=== Year-end charts ===
2017 year-end chart performance for "Party"
Chart (2017)	Position
US Hot R&B/Hip-Hop Songs (Billboard)	50
US R&B/Hip-Hop Airplay (Billboard)	22
US Rhythmic (Billboard)	25

== Certifications ==
Certifications for "Party"
Region	Certification	Certified units/sales
Australia (ARIA)	Platinum	70,000^{‡}
Canada (Music Canada)	Gold	40,000^{‡}
New Zealand (RMNZ)	2× Platinum	60,000^{‡}
United Kingdom (BPI)	Gold	400,000^{‡}
United States (RIAA)	3× Platinum	3,000,000^{‡}
^{‡} Sales+streaming figures based on certification alone.

== Release history ==
Region	Date	Format	Label	Ref.
United States	December 16, 2016	Digital download	RCA	
United States	January 10, 2017	Rhythmic contemporary	RCA	
United States	March 1, 2017	Urban contemporary	RCA	
