= One Hell of a Nite Tour =

2015–16 concert tour by Chris Brown

- Tour by Chris Brown
- Promotional poster for the tour
- Associated album: Royalty
- Start date: August 12, 2015
- End date: June 15, 2016
- No. of shows: 25 in North America; 16 in Europe; 41 in total

Chris Brown concert chronology
- Between the Sheets Tour (2015); One Hell of a Nite Tour (2015–16); The Party Tour (2017)

The One Hell of a Nite Tour was the sixth concert tour by American singer Chris Brown to support his seventh studio album, Royalty.

== Tour dates ==
Date	City	Country	Venue
North America
August 12, 2015	Kansas City	United States	Sprint Center
August 13, 2015	St. Louis	United States	Scottrade Center
August 14, 2015	Tinley Park	United States	First Midwest Bank Amphitheatre
August 15, 2015	Noblesville	United States	Klipsch Music Center
August 16, 2015	Clarkston	United States	DTE Energy Music Theatre
August 18, 2015	Cuyahoga Falls	United States	Blossom Music Center
August 19, 2015	Darien	United States	Darien Lake Performing Arts Center
August 21, 2015	Camden	United States	Susquehanna Bank Center
August 22, 2015	Bristow	United States	Jiffy Lube Live
August 23, 2015	Bridgeport	United States	Webster Bank Arena
August 26, 2016	Holmdel	United States	PNC Bank Arts Center
August 28, 2016	Saratoga Springs	United States	Saratoga Performing Arts Center
August 29, 2015	Mansfield	United States	Xfinity Center
August 30, 2015	Wantagh	United States	Nikon at Jones Beach Theatre
September 1, 2015	Pelham	United States	Oak Mountain Amphitheatre
September 3, 2015	Miami	United States	American Airlines Arena
September 4, 2015	Tampa	United States	MidFlorida Credit Union Amphitheatre
September 5, 2015	Atlanta	United States	Aaron's Amphitheatre at Lakewood
September 9, 2015	Elroy	United States	Austin360 Amphitheatre
September 10, 2015	Dallas	United States	Gexa Energy Pavilion
September 12, 2015	Albuquerque	United States	lsleta Amphitheatre
September 15, 2015	Phoenix	United States	US Airways Center
September 17, 2015	Chula Vista	United States	Sleep Train Amphitheatre
September 18, 2015	Anaheim	United States	Honda Center
September 19, 2015	Concord	United States	Concord Pavilion
Europe
May 22, 2016	Frankfurt	Germany	Festhalle
May 24, 2016	Lyon	France	Halle Tony Garnier
May 25, 2016	Montpellier	France	Park&Suites Arena
May 26, 2016	Zürich	Switzerland	Hallenstadion
May 28, 2016	Paris	France	Bercy Arena
May 31, 2016	Antwerp	Belgium	Lotto Arena
June 2, 2016	Stockholm	Sweden	Ericsson Globe
June 3, 2016	Oslo	Norway	Oslo Spektrum
June 5, 2016	Copenhagen	Denmark	Forum Copenhagen
June 7, 2016	Hamburg	Germany	Barclaycard Arena
June 8, 2016	Munich	Germany	Olympiahalle
June 9, 2016	Oberhausen	Germany	Koenig-Pilsener Arena
June 11, 2016	Amsterdam	Netherlands	Ziggo Dome
June 12, 2016	Luxembourg	Luxembourg	Rockhal
June 15, 2016	Dublin	Ireland	3Arena
June 17, 2016	Baku	Azerbaijan	Baku Boulevard
June 19, 2016	Barcelona	Spain	Palau Sant Jordi
