= Wrist (Chris Brown song) =

Song by Chris Brown featuring Solo Lucci

from the album Royalty
- Released: December 3, 2015
- Recorded: 2015
- Genre: Trap; R&B; hip hop
- Length: 3:14
- Label: RCA
- Songwriters: Chris Brown; Lyrica Anderson; Michael Hernandez; Christopher Dotson; Floyd "A1" Bentley; Michael Dorsey; Bobby Joseph Turner Jr.; Caleb Nordelus
- Producers: The MeKanics; Khemasis; Prince Chrishan; Floyd "A1" Bentley

Music video
- "Wrist" on YouTube

"Wrist" is a song by American singer Chris Brown from his seventh studio album Royalty. It was launched along with an iTunes pre-order of the album on December 3, 2015. It was produced by The MeKanics and Khemasis and features rapper Solo Lucci. The song received mixed reviews from music critics and peaked at number 17 on the US Bubbling Under Hot 100 Singles, and number 46 on the US Hot R&B/Hip-Hop Songs chart.

An official remix of the song featuring Young Thug and Jeezy was released in 2016 and is contained in OHB and Brown's collaborative mixtape Before the Trap: Nights in Tarzana.

== Composition ==
"Wrist" is a trap song with some heavy influences from R&B and hip hop.

== Music video ==
On December 15, 2015, Brown uploaded the music video for "Wrist" on his YouTube and Vevo account.

== Critical reception ==
"Wrist" received mixed reviews from music critics. Susan Smith of The Columbus Dispatch said that Brown on the song puts on his "singer-with-rapper-sensibilities" persona, for an "edgy" and "very likable" song. Michael Arcenaux of Complex said that the song "comes across as rather banal and beneath Brown's talent". Brad Wete of Billboard said that the song is one of the standout moments on Royalty, comparing it to Brown's previous single "Look at Me Now" (2011). Mike Pizzo of Las Vegas Weekly said that in the song Solo Lucci is a "Future ripoff". Brandon Caldwell of Houston Press, despite commending Lucci's performance on the track, said that the song "sucks", criticizing its lyrics, saying that "Brown is a legend, of the bad-boy variety. He's also the creator of far too many songs that should never have left the studio, "Wrist" included".

== Charts ==
Chart performance for "Wrist"
Chart (2016)	Peak position
US Bubbling Under Hot 100 Singles (Billboard)	17
US Hot R&B/Hip-Hop Songs (Billboard)	46

== Certifications ==
Certifications for "Wrist"
Region	Certification	Certified units/sales
New Zealand (RMNZ)	Gold	15,000^{‡}
United States (RIAA)	Gold	500,000^{‡}
^{‡} Sales+streaming figures based on certification alone.
