= Chris Brown videography =

Videos and media by American singer

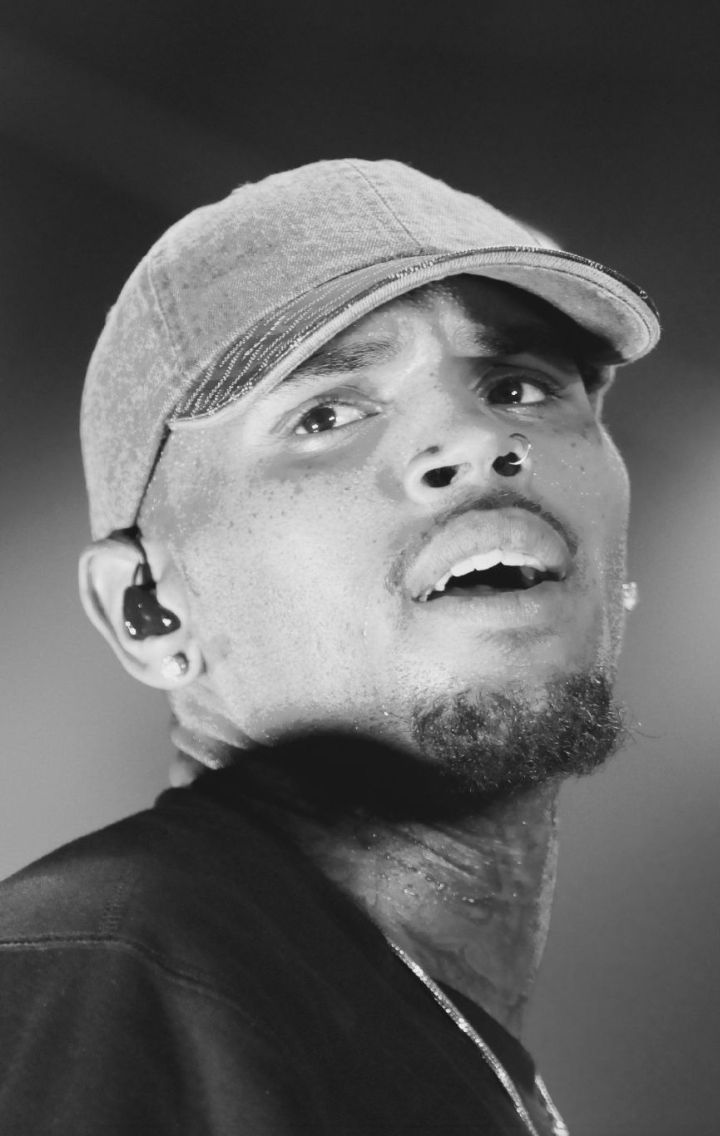
- Brown performing in 2015
- Music videos: 100
- Video albums: 4
- Films: 8

Chris Brown is an American R&B singer-songwriter and actor who has appeared in many music videos. His videography consists of 100 music videos (including 121 as a featured artist), 19 guest appearances, 4 video albums, 8 film appearances and 11 television appearances.

Brown's first music video was for his debut single "Run It!", taken from his self-titled debut album. Directed by Erik White, the video "introduced the world" to Brown's dance moves. White and Brown directed the accompanying music video for the second single "Yo (Excuse Me Miss)", which made reference to Michael Jackson. Some of Brown's other videos have been noted for its similarities to Jackson's work, including his music videos for "Wall to Wall" (2007), "Yeah 3x" (2010), "She Ain't You" (2011) and "Turn Up the Music" (2012). In 2007, Brown made his acting debut in the film, Stomp the Yard, as Duron. That same year, he also appeared in This Christmas as Michael "Baby" Whitfield. Brown's music video for the single "Forever" (2008) was directed by Joseph Kahn and was "highly regarded as one of the best videos of 2008". It earned Brown three nominations at the 2008 MTV Video Music Awards in the categories of Best Dancing in a Video, Best Choreography and Video of the Year.

Joseph Kahn also directed the music videos for the singles "I Can Transform Ya" and "Crawl", taken from Brown's third studio album Graffiti (2009). In 2010, Brown appeared in the film, Takers, as Jesse Attica. Which he produced as well His music video for "Look at Me Now" (from his fourth studio album F.A.M.E.) was well received by critics for displaying various colors and intricate routines performed by Brown and several dancers. It won Video of the Year at the 2011 BET Awards. Colin Tilley directed the video for "Next to You" — a collaboration with Justin Bieber, which was set in a post-apocalyptic environment. The music video for "Beautiful People" featured personal footage of Brown's everyday life and cameo appearances from Diddy, Brandy, Bow Wow, T-Pain, Nelly and Timbaland, among others. In 2012, Brown starred in the film, Think Like a Man, as Alex.

== Music videos ==
=== As lead artist ===
Year	Title	Album	Director(s)
2002	"Whose Girl Is That"	—N/a	—N/a
2005	"Run It!" (featuring Juelz Santana)	Chris Brown	Erik White
2005	"Yo (Excuse Me Miss)"	Chris Brown	Erik White, Chris Brown
2006	"Gimme That" (Remix) (featuring Lil Wayne)	Chris Brown	Erik White
2006	"Say Goodbye"	Chris Brown	Jessy Terrero
2007	"Wall to Wall"	Exclusive	Erik White, Chris Brown
2007	"Wall to Wall" (Remix) (featuring Jadakiss)	Exclusive	Erik White, Chris Brown
2007	"Kiss Kiss" (featuring T-Pain)	Exclusive	Erik White, Chris Brown
2007	"This Christmas"	This Christmas soundtrack	Chris Brown
2007	"With You"	Exclusive	Erik White, Chris Brown
2008	"Take You Down"	Exclusive	Harvey White
2008	"Forever"	Exclusive	Joseph Kahn
2008	"Superhuman" (featuring Keri Hilson)	Exclusive	Erik White
2009	"I Can Transform Ya" (featuring Lil Wayne and Swizz Beatz)	Graffiti	Joseph Kahn
2009	"Crawl"	Graffiti	Joseph Kahn
2010	"Holla At Me" (with Tyga)	Fan of a Fan	Alex Nazari
2010	"G Shit" (with Tyga)	Fan of a Fan	Alex Nazari
2010	"Deuces" (featuring Tyga and Kevin McCall)	Fan of a Fan and F.A.M.E.	Colin Tilley
2010	"No Bullshit"	Fan of a Fan and F.A.M.E.	Colin Tilley
2010	"Yeah 3x"	F.A.M.E.	Colin Tilley
2011	"Matrix"	—N/a	Colin Tilley
2011	"Real Hip Hop Shit" (featuring Kevin McCall)	Boy in Detention	—N/a
2011	"Look at Me Now" (featuring Lil Wayne and Busta Rhymes)	F.A.M.E.	Colin Tilley
2011	"Beautiful People" (featuring Benny Benassi)	F.A.M.E.	Chris Brown, Esteban Serrano De Leon
2011	"Real Hip Hop Shit #4" (featuring Kevin McCall)	Boy in Detention	—N/a
2011	"Spend It All" (featuring Se7en and Kevin McCall)	Boy in Detention	—N/a
2011	"Last"	Boy in Detention	Godfrey Tabarez
2011	"She Ain't You"	F.A.M.E.	Colin Tilley
2011	"Should've Kissed You"	F.A.M.E.	Godfrey Tabarez
2011	"Your Body"	Boy in Detention	Godfrey Tabarez
2011	"Next to You" (featuring Justin Bieber)	F.A.M.E.	Colin Tilley
2011	"All About You"	F.A.M.E.	—N/a
2011	"Yoko" (featuring Berner, Wiz Khalifa and Big K.R.I.T.)	Boy in Detention	Godfrey Tabarez, Tha Razor
2011	"Niggas in Paris" (featuring T-Pain)	—N/a	Godfrey Tabarez
2011	"Strip" (featuring Kevin McCall)	Boy in Detention and Fortune	Colin Tilley
2012	"Turn Up the Music"	Fortune	Godfrey Taberez, Chris Brown
2012	"How I Feel"	—N/a	Godfrey Tabarez
2012	"Mercy" (Remix)	—N/a	Colin Tilley
2012	"Sweet Love"	Fortune	Godfrey Taberez, Chris Brown
2012	"Till I Die" (featuring Big Sean and Wiz Khalifa)	Fortune	Chris Brown
2012	"Don't Wake Me Up"	Fortune	Colin Tilley
2012	"Don't Judge Me"	Fortune	Colin Tilley
2013	"Home"	—N/a	David Alan
2013	"Fine China"	X	Chris Brown, Sylvain White
2013	"Don't Think They Know" (featuring Aaliyah)	X	Chris Brown
2013	"Love More" (featuring Nicki Minaj)	X	Chris Brown
2014	"Loyal" (featuring Lil Wayne and Tyga)	X	Chris Brown
2014	"New Flame" (featuring Usher and Rick Ross)	X	Chris Brown
2014	"Don't Be Gone Too Long" (featuring Ariana Grande)	X	Chris Brown
2015	"Autumn Leaves" (featuring Kendrick Lamar)	X	Colin Tilley
2015	"Ayo" (with Tyga)	Fan of a Fan: The Album	Colin Tilley
2015	"Bitches N Marijuana" (with Tyga featuring Schoolboy Q)	Fan of a Fan: The Album	Colin Tilley
2015	"Liquor" / "Zero"	Royalty	Chris Brown
2015	"Fine by Me"	Royalty	Chris Brown
2015	"Back to Sleep"	Royalty	Chris Brown
2015	"Wrist" (featuring Solo Lucci)	Royalty	Chris Brown
2015	"Anyway" (featuring Tayla Parx)	Royalty	Chris Brown
2015	"Picture Me Rollin'"	Royalty	Chris Brown
2015	"Little More (Royalty)"	Royalty	Chris Brown
2016	"Grass Ain't Greener"	Heartbreak on a Full Moon	Chris Brown
2016	"Party" (featuring Usher and Gucci Mane)	Heartbreak on a Full Moon	Chris Brown
2017	"Privacy"	Heartbreak on a Full Moon	Chris Brown
2017	"Questions"	Heartbreak on a Full Moon	Chris Brown
2017	"Pills & Automobiles" (featuring Yo Gotti, A Boogie wit da Hoodie and Kodak Black)	Heartbreak on a Full Moon	Chris Brown
2017	"High End" (featuring Future and Young Thug)	Heartbreak on a Full Moon	Chris Brown, Spiff TV
2018	"Tempo"	Heartbreak on a Full Moon	Chris Brown
2018	"Hope You Do"	Heartbreak on a Full Moon	Chris Brown, Daniel CZ
2018	"To My Bed"	Heartbreak on a Full Moon	Chris Brown, Daniel CZ
2019	"Undecided"	Indigo	Chris Brown, Arrad
2019	"Back to Love"	Indigo	Chris Brown
2019	"Wobble Up" (featuring Nicki Minaj and G-Eazy)	Indigo	Chris Brown, Arrad
2019	"No Guidance" (featuring Drake)	Indigo	Chris Robinson
2019	"Heat" (featuring Gunna)	Indigo	Edgar Esteves, Chris Brown
2020	"Go Crazy" (with Young Thug)	Slime & B	Mat Fuller
2020	"Say You Love Me" (with Young Thug)	Slime & B	Mat Fuller
2020	"City Girls" (with Young Thug)	Slime & B	Jake Miosge
2021	"Go Crazy (Remix)" (with Young Thug featuring Lil Durk, Mulatto and Future)	—N/a	Daps
2022	"Iffy"	Breezy	Joseph Kahn
2022	"WE (Warm Embrace)"	Breezy	Arrad
2022	"C.A.B. (Catch a Body)" (featuring Fivio Foreign)	Breezy	Damien Sandoval
2022	"Call Me Every Day" (featuring Wizkid)	Breezy	Child
2022	"Under the Influence"	Indigo	Child
2022	"It's Giving Christmas"	Breezy – It's Giving Christmas	—N/a
2022	"No Time Like Christmas"	Breezy – It's Giving Christmas	—N/a
2023	"Psychic" (featuring Jack Harlow)	Breezy	Cameron Dean
2023	"Talm' Bout"	Breezy	Travis Colbert
2023	"Summer Too Hot"	11:11	Christian Breslauer
2023	"Sensational" (featuring Davido and Lojay)	11:11	Child
2023	"Nightmares" (featuring Byron Messia)	11:11	Travis Colbert
2024	"Angel Numbers / Ten Toes"	11:11	Jamar Harding
2024	"Go Girlfriend"	11:11	Jamar Harding
2024	"Press Me"	11:11	Jamar Harding
2024	"Feel Something"	11:11	Jamar Harding
2024	"Hmmm" (featuring Davido)	11:11	Travis Colbert
2025	"Residuals"	11:11	Travis Colbert
2025	"Holy Blindfold"	Brown	Travis Colbert
2026	"Fallin'" (featuring Leon Thomas)	Brown	Travis Colbert
2026	"For the Moment"	Brown	Travis Colbert
2026	"It Depends" / "Obvious"	Brown	Travis Colbert

=== As featured artist ===
Year	Title	Album	Director(s)
2006	"Shortie Like Mine" (Bow Wow featuring Chris Brown and Johntá Austin)	The Price of Fame	Bryan Barber
2008	"Shawty Get Loose" (Lil Mama featuring Chris Brown and T-Pain)	VYP (Voice of the Young People)	R. Malcolm Jones
2008	"No Air" (with Jordin Sparks)	Jordin Sparks	Chris Robinson
2008	"Get Like Me" (David Banner featuring Chris Brown)	The Greatest Story Ever Told	Ulysses Terrero, Kai Henry
2008	"What Them Girls Like" (Ludacris featuring Chris Brown and Sean Garrett)	Theater of the Mind	Chris Robinson
2008	"Head of My Class" (Scooter Smiff featuring Chris Brown)	—N/a	Erik White
2008	"Make the World Go Round" (Nas featuring Chris Brown and The Game)	Untitled Nas album	Chris Robinson
2009	"Freeze" (T-Pain featuring Chris Brown)	Thr33 Ringz	Syndrome
2009	"Better on the Other Side" (with The Game, Diddy, DJ Khalil, Polow da Don, Mario Winans, Usher and Boyz II Men)	—N/a	Taydoe
2009	"Drop It Low" (Ester Dean featuring Chris Brown)	Music Inspired by More than a Game	Joseph Kahn
2009	"Back to the Crib" (Juelz Santana featuring Chris Brown)	—N/a	Chris Robinson
2010	"Make a Movie" (Twista featuring Chris Brown)	The Perfect Storm	Colin Tilley
2010	"Ain't Thinkin' 'Bout You" (Bow Wow featuring Chris Brown)	Fan of a Fan	Colin Tilley
2010	"Get Back Up" (T.I. featuring Chris Brown)	No Mercy	Maya Table
2010	"Green Goblin" (Jae Millz featuring Chris Brown)	Dead Presidents	Antwan Smith
2010	"Champion" (Chipmunk featuring Chris Brown)	Transition and F.A.M.E.	Colin Tilley
2011	"Another Planet" (Jawan Harris featuring Chris Brown)	—N/a	Colin Tilley
2011	"Wonder Woman" (Tyga featuring Chris Brown)	Well Done	Alex Nazari
2011	"Yesterday" (Diddy – Dirty Money featuring Chris Brown)	Last Train to Paris	Colin Tilley
2011	"One Night Stand" (Keri Hilson featuring Chris Brown)	No Boys Allowed	Colin Tilley
2011	"My Last" (Big Sean featuring Chris Brown)	Finally Famous	TAJ Stansberry
2011	"Best Love Song" (T-Pain featuring Chris Brown)	Revolver	Erik White
2011	"Better with the Lights Off" (New Boyz featuring Chris Brown)	Too Cool to Care	Colin Tilley
2011	"Snapbacks Back" (Tyga featuring Chris Brown)	Well Done 2 and Boy In Detention	Alex Nazari
2011	"Pot of Gold" (Game featuring Chris Brown)	The R.E.D. Album	Bryan Barber
2011	"Body 2 Body" (Ace Hood featuring Chris Brown)	Blood, Sweat & Tears	Dayo
2011	"International Love" (Pitbull featuring Chris Brown)	Planet Pit	Dave Rousseau
2011	"Another Round" (Fat Joe featuring Chris Brown)	—N/a	Colin Tilley
2012	"Why Stop Now" (Busta Rhymes featuring Chris Brown)	—N/a	Hype Williams
2012	"Right by My Side" (Nicki Minaj featuring Chris Brown)	Pink Friday: Roman Reloaded	Benny Boom
2012	"Amazing" (David Banner featuring Chris Brown)	Sex, Drugs & Video Games	KTJB
2012	"Take It to the Head" (DJ Khaled featuring Chris Brown Rick Ross, Nicki Minaj and Lil Wayne)	Kiss the Ring	Colin Tilley
2012	"I Can Only Imagine" (David Guetta featuring Chris Brown and Lil Wayne)	Nothing but the Beat	Colin Tilley
2012	"Put It Down" (Brandy featuring Chris Brown)	Two Eleven	Hype Williams
2012	"Algo Me Gusta de Ti" (Wisin & Yandel featuring Chris Brown and T-Pain)	Líderes	Jessy Terrero
2012	"Function" (Remix) (E-40 featuring Young Jeezy, Chris Brown, French Montana, Red Café and Problem)	—N/a	Fredo Tovar, Scott Fleishman
2012	"Celebration" (The Game featuring Chris Brown, Tyga, Wiz Khalifa and Lil Wayne)	Jesus Piece	Matt Alonzo
2012	"Everyday Birthday" (Swizz Beatz featuring Chris Brown and Ludacris)	—N/a	Taj TPK
2013	"Ready" (Fabolous featuring Chris Brown)	—N/a	Taj TPK
2013	"Beat It" (Sean Kingston featuring Chris Brown and Wiz Khalifa)	Back 2 Life	Colin Tilley
2013	"For the Road" (Tyga featuring Chris Brown)	Hotel California	Colin Tilley
2013	"Shots Fired" (Tank featuring Chris Brown)	—N/a	Mike Ho
2013	"Sweet Serenade" (Pusha T featuring Chris Brown)	My Name Is My Name	Colin Tilley
2013	"It Won't Stop" (Sevyn Streeter featuring Chris Brown)	Call Me Crazy, But...	Chris Brown
2013	"Show Me" (Kid Ink featuring Chris Brown)	My Own Lane	Chris Brown
2014	"Episode" (E-40 featuring T.I. and Chris Brown)	The Block Brochure: Welcome to the Soil 4	Ben Griffin
2014	"Memory" (Asher Monroe featuring Chris Brown)	On My Way, Pt. 1	Chris Brown
2014	"Hold You Down" (DJ Khaled featuring Chris Brown, August Alsina, Future and Jeremih)	I Changed a Lot	Gil Green, DJ Khaled
2014	"Only" (Nicki Minaj featuring Drake, Lil Wayne and Chris Brown)	The Pinkprint	Hannah Lux Davis
2015	"Post to Be" (Omarion featuring Chris Brown and Jhené Aiko)	Sex Playlist	Omarion, Jay Ahn, Taz
2015	"Don't Kill the Fun" (Sevyn Streeter featuring Chris Brown)	Shoulda Been There, Pt. 1	Chris Brown
2015	"Five More Hours" (with Deorro)	Good Evening	Andrew Sandler
2015	"Private Show" (T.I. featuring Chris Brown)	Paperwork	Emil Nava
2015	"How Many Times" (DJ Khaled featuring Chris Brown, Lil Wayne and Big Sean)	I Changed a Lot	Colin Tilley
2015	"You Changed Me" (Jamie Foxx featuring Chris Brown)	Hollywood: A Story of a Dozen Roses	Director X
2015	"Fun" (Pitbull featuring Chris Brown)	Globalization	Gil Green
2015	"Do It Again" (Pia Mia featuring Chris Brown and Tyga)	—N/a	Sky Jason Shields, Colin Tilley
2015	"Play No Games" (Big Sean featuring Chris Brown and Ty Dolla $ign)	Dark Sky Paradise	Mark Carson
2015	"All Eyes on You" (Meek Mill featuring Nicki Minaj and Chris Brown)	Dreams Worth More Than Money	Benny Boom
2015	"Body on Me" (Rita Ora featuring Chris Brown)	—N/a	Colin Tilley
2015	"Put On My Niggas" (Compton Menace featuring Chris Brown)	The Way It Is	Dale Resteghini
2015	"Moses" (French Montana featuring Chris Brown and Migos)	Casino Life 2	Spiff TV
2015	"Gold Slugs" (DJ Khaled featuring Chris Brown, August Alsina and Fetty Wap)	I Changed a Lot	Eif Rivera
2015	"She Wildin'" (Fabolous featuring Chris Brown)	The Young OG Project	Gerard Victor
2015	"Ain't Shit Change" (Cal Scruby featuring Chris Brown)	House In the Hills	Andrew Sandler
2015	"Player" (Tinashe featuring Chris Brown)	—N/a	Emil Nava
2015	"Sorry" (Rick Ross featuring Chris Brown)	Black Market	Taj
2016	"Paradise" (with Benny Benassi)	Danceaholic	Daniel CZ
2016	"Drifting" (G-Eazy featuring Chris Brown and Tory Lanez)	When It's Dark Out	Daniel CZ
2016	"Bounce" (Kid Red featuring Chris Brown and Migos)	Guilty by Association	Keemotion
2016	"I'm the Man (Remix)" (50 Cent featuring Chris Brown)	—N/a	Eif Rivera
2016	"Wishing" (DJ Drama featuring Chris Brown, Skeme and LyQuin)	Quality Street Music 2	Eavvon O'Neal
2016	"No Romeo No Juliet" (50 Cent featuring Chris Brown)	—N/a	Eif Rivera
2016	"Leave Broke" (Famous Fresh featuring Chris Brown)	—N/a	Daniel CZ, Andrew Listerman
2016	"Do You Mind" (DJ Khaled featuring Nicki Minaj, Chris Brown, August Alsina, Jeremih, Future and Rick Ross)	Major Key	Gil Green
2017	"Hold Up" (French Montana featuring Chris Brown and Migos)	—N/a	Keemotion
2017	"I Think of You" (Jeremih featuring Chris Brown and Big Sean)	—N/a	Daniel CZ
2017	"I See You" (Kap G featuring Chris Brown)	SupaJefe	Arrad
2017	"Pie" (Future featuring Chris Brown)	Hndrxx	Nick Walker
2017	"Tone It Down" (Gucci Mane featuring Chris Brown)	Mr. Davis	Eif Rivera
2017	"Perfect" (Dave East featuring Chris Brown)	Paranoia: A True Story	Arrad
2017	"Post & Delete" (Zoey Dollaz featuring Chris Brown)	M'ap Boule	Edward Tran
2017	"Jiu Jitsu" (OneInThe4rest featuring Chris Brown)	—N/a	Arrad
2017	"Just As I Am" (Spiff TV featuring Prince Royce and Chris Brown)	Five	Spiff TV
2017	"Flipmode" (Remix) (Fabolous featuring Velous and Chris Brown)	—N/a	Gerard Victor
2018	"Melanin Magic" (Remy Ma featuring Chris Brown)	—N/a	Millicent Hailes, Remy Ma
2018	"Stranger Things" (with Joyner Lucas)	—N/a	Joyner Lucas, Ben Proulx
2018	"Freaky Friday" (Lil Dicky featuring Chris Brown)	—N/a	Tony Yacenda
2018	"Save It for Me" (Yo Gotti featuring Chris Brown)	I Still Am	Shane C. Drake, Yo Gotti
2018	"I Don't Die" (with Joyner Lucas)	—N/a	Joyner Lucas, Ben Proulx
2018	"Love You Better" (King Combs featuring Chris Brown)	—N/a	Andrew Sandler
2018	"Left, Right" (Casanova featuring Chris Brown and Fabolous)	Commissary	—N/a
2018	"Fairytale" (with Skye)	—N/a	Eif Rivera
2018	"Attention" (Fat Joe and Dre featuring Chris Brown)	—N/a	Eif Rivera
2018	"Overdose" (Agnez Mo featuring Chris Brown)	—N/a	Agnez Mo
2019	"Chi Chi" (Trey Songz featuring Chris Brown)	—N/a	Jon J
2019	"Light It Up" (with Marshmello and Tyga)	—N/a	Arrad
2019	"Jealous" (DJ Khaled featuring Chris Brown, Lil Wayne and Big Sean)	Father of Asahd	DJ Khaled, Eif Rivera
2019	"Haute" (Tyga featuring J. Balvin and Chris Brown)	Legendary	Tyga, Arrad
2019	"Type a Way" (Eric Bellinger featuring Chris Brown and OG Parker)	The Rebirth 2	Arrad
2019	"Easy (Remix)" (DaniLeigh featuring Chris Brown)	—N/a	Divad
2019	"Blow My Mind" (with Davido)	A Good Time	Edgar Esteves
2019	"Restroom Occupied" (Yella Beezy featuring Chris Brown)	Baccend Beezy	Ben Griffin
2020	"Put In Work" (Jacquees featuring Chris Brown)	—N/a	BPace
2021	"Provide" (G-Eazy featuring Chris Brown and Mark Morrison)	These Things Happen Too	Edgar Esteves
2021	"F.E.E.L.S." (Tory Lanez featuring Chris Brown)	Playboy	Christian Breslauer
2021	"Already Best Friends" (Jack Harlow featuring Chris Brown)	Thats What They All Say	Ace Pro
2021	"Come Through" (H.E.R. featuring Chris Brown)	Back of My Mind	Child
2021	"Angles" (Wale featuring Chris Brown)	Folarin 2	Daniel CZ
2021	"Baddest" (Yung Bleu featuring Chris Brown and 2 Chainz)	Moon Boy	Edgar Esteves
2021	"Shopping Spree" (Davido featuring Chris Brown and Young Thug)	A Better Time	Des Gray
2021	"Nostálgico" (with Rvssian and Rauw Alejandro)	—N/a	Edgar Esteves
2022	"Nasty" (Tyga featuring Chris Brown)	—N/a	Christian Breslauer
2023	"How Does It Feel" (Chlöe featuring Chris Brown)	In Pieces	Arrad
2023	"Don't Give It Away" (Fridayy featuring Chris Brown)	Fridayy	The.97
2023	"How We Roll" (with Ciara)	CiCi	Christian Breslauer
2023	"City of Dreams" (Tyla Yaweh featuring Chris Brown)	Heart Full of Rage 2	Shapxo
2023	"IDGAF" (Tee Grizzley featuring Chris Brown and Mariah the Scientist)	Tee's Coney Island	Blu, Mikey Rare
2024	"Wake Up" (Skylar Blatt featuring Chris Brown)	TBA	Travis Colbert
2024	"Wait on It" (Jeremih featuring Bryson Tiller and Chris Brown)	TBA	BenMarc
2025	"Use Me" (with Bow Wow)	TBA	Otto Sterling

=== Guest appearances ===
Year	Title	Album	Director(s)
2005	"Presidential" (YoungBloodZ)	Ev'rybody Know Me	Lenny Bass
2005	"Gotta Go" (Trey Songz)	I Gotta Make It	Vem, Delante Murphy, Trey Songz
2009	"Slow Dance" (Keri Hilson)	In a Perfect World...	Chris Robinson
2010	"I'm So Raw" (Tyga)	Fan of a Fan	Alex Nazari
2010	"Nobody" (Jawan Harris)	—N/a	—N/a
2010	"Cat Daddy" (The Rej3ctz)	TheFUNKtion vs theKICKback	Alex Nazari
2011	"Favor" (Lonny Bereal featuring Kelly Rowland)	The Love Train	Juwan Lee
2012	"Slight Work" (Wale featuring Big Sean)	Ambition	Chris Brown, Godfrey Tabarez
2012	"Think Like a Man" (Jennifer Hudson and Ne-Yo featuring Rick Ross)	Think Like a Man	Chris Robinson
2012	"Ayy Ladies" (Travis Porter featuring Tyga)	From Day 1	Alex Nazari
2012	"Naked" (Kevin McCall featuring Big Sean)	—N/a	Chris Brown, Godfrey Tabarez
2012	"Amnesia" (Luvaboy TJ)	—N/a	Chris Brown
2012	"Rum and Raybans" (Sean Kingston featuring Cher Lloyd)	Back 2 Life	Hannah Lux Davis
2013	"Ali Bomaye" (The Game featuring 2 Chainz and Rick Ross)	Jesus Piece	J.R. Saint
2013	"REDD" (U.G.L.Y. featuring Maad Scientist)	—N/a	Chris Brown
2016	"Famous" (Kanye West featuring Rihanna and Swiss Beatz)	The Life of Pablo	Kanye West, Eli Linnetz
2018	"Feels Like Summer" (Childish Gambino)	Summer Pack	Donald Glover, Ivan Dixon, Greg Sharp
2021	"Stamina" (Hoodybaby and Lil Duke)	—N/a	BPace, Hoodybaby
2021	"Blue Emerald" (Rich Gang featuring Young Thug)	—N/a	Michelle Parker

== Filmography ==
=== Films ===
Year	Title	Role	Notes
2007	Stomp the Yard	Duron Williams	Supporting role
2007	This Christmas	Michael "Baby" Whitfield	Leading role
2010	Takers	Jesse Attica	Supporting role, executive producer
2012	Think Like a Man	Alex	Supporting role
2012	Bad 25	Himself	Documentary
2013	Battle of the Year	Rooster	Supporting role
2017	Chris Brown: Welcome to My Life	Himself	Documentary
2021	She Ball	T.A.K.O.	Supporting role

=== Television ===
Year	Title	Role	Notes
2006	One on One	Himself	"Recipe for Disaster" (Season 5, episode 17)
2006	Christmas in Washington	Himself	Guest Star
2007	Chris Brown: Journey to South Africa	Himself	A documentary of Brown's first trip to Africa
2007	The O.C.	Will Tutt	"The My Two Dads" (Season 4, episode 9) "The French Connection" (Season 4, episode 10) "The Dream Lover" (Season 4, episode 11)
2007	Sesame Street	Himself	Guest Star
2007	Generations	Himself	Guest Star
2008	The Suite Life of Zack & Cody	Himself	"Doin' Time in Suite 2330" (Season 3, episode 20)
2011	Tosh.0	Himself	Season 3, episode 10
2015	Real Husbands of Hollywood	Himself	Season 4, episode 4
2017	Black-ish	Richard Youngsta	Guest Star
2024	Coulda Been House	Himself	Guest Star

== Video albums ==
List of video album DVDs, with selected details
Title	Album details	Certifications	Content
Chris Brown's Journey	Released: June 13, 2006; Label: Jive; Format: DVD, CD	RIAA: Gold	Contains the music videos for "Run It!", "Yo (Excuse Me Miss)" and "Gimme That", as well as a documentary of Brown's highlights from his UK and Japan promotional trips, his homecoming in Virginia, the Grammy Awards and upcoming tour rehearsals.
BET Presents Chris Brown	Released: November 6, 2007; Label: Jive; Format: DVD		Contains Brown's performance and acceptance speech at the 2006 BET Awards, his exclusive 18th birthday celebration, interviews, and music videos for "Wall to Wall", "Yo (Excuse Me Miss)", "Say Goodbye" and "Gimmie That".
A Star Is Born: Unauthorized	Released: February 19, 2008; Label: Azure; Format: DVD		A documentary about Brown.
Exclusive: The Forever Edition Bonus DVD	Released: June 3, 2008; Label: Jive; Format: DVD		Contains performances from Brown's Up Close and Personal Tour, interviews, and behind the scenes footage.

== Commercials ==
Company / product	Year	Ref.
Doublemint	2008	
Fortune	2012	
Snipes	2016	
Bussin’	2023	
