= Gabrielle Nowee =

American singer-songwriter

Gabrielle "Goldiie" Nowee
- Also known as: Goldie
- Born: June 4, 1985 (age 40)
- Origin: Los Angeles
- Genres: R&B, pop, EDM
- Occupations: Singer, songwriter
- Instruments: Vocals, piano
- Labels: Universal

Gabrielle "Goldiie" Nowee (born June 4, 1989) is an American songwriter. She has worked with many songwriters including Diane Warren, Babyface, P. Diddy, and Tricky Stewart. In 2012, she was a finalist on the hit television show The Voice, and she has also appeared in a music video for 50 Cent. Goldiie is most known for her songwriting for Chris Brown, David Guetta, Christina Aguilera, K Camp, Busta Rhymes, Nipsey Hussle, Jesse McCartney, Luke James, G Eazy, Kehlani, TLC, Meek Mill, Jeremih, and Ty Dolla Sign. She is associated with the Universal Music Publishing Group.

== Songwriting credits ==
Year	Artist(s)	Album	Song	Ref
2008	Nipsey Hussle	Bullets Ain't Got No Name Vol. 2	"Hussle in the House"	
2008	Nipsey Hussle	Bullets Ain't Got No Name Vol. 1	"One Take Freestyle"	
2011	Roshawn Lyles	Non-album single	"Screaming"	
2012	Alex Jacke	Non-album single	"Callin for You"	
2012	Alex Jacke	Non-album single	"Days of Our Lives"	
2015	Chris Brown	Before the Party	"4 Seconds"	
2015	Chris Brown	Royalty	"Picture Me Rollin’"	
2015	Chris Brown	Royalty	"Little Bit"	
2015	Chris Brown	Royalty	"Who's Gonna (NOBODY)	
2016	Jesse McCartney	Non-album single	"Out of Words"	
2017	AGNEZ MO	X	"Long As I Get Paid"	
2017	Chris Brown	Heartbreak on a Full Moon	"Confidence"	
2017	G-Eazy	The Beautiful & Damned	"Crash and Burn"	
2017	Ty Dolla Sign	Beach House 3	"Pineapple"	
2017	Kid Ink	7 Series	"Bad Lil Vibe"	
2017	Keyshia Cole	11:11 Reset	"Incapable"	
2017	K. Michelle	Kimberly: The People I Used to Know	"God, Love, Sex, and Drugs"	
2017	K. Michelle	Kimberly: The People I Used to Know	"Takes Two"	
2017	K. Michelle	Kimberly: The People I Used to Know	"Birthday"	
2017	DaniLeigh	Summer With Friends	"Lurkin"	
2017	Sevyn Streeter	Girl Disrupted	"Soon as I Get Home"	
2018	Jeremih, Ty Dolla Sign	MihTy	"The Light"^{[a]}	
2018	Meek Mill	Championships	"Dangerous"	
2018	Cymphonique	No Days Off	"Drippin'"	
2018	T.I.	Dime Trap	"Seasons"	
2019	Chris Brown	Indigo	"Girl Of My Dreams"	
2019	Chris Brown	Indigo	"All On Me"	
2019	Algee Smith	ATL	"Fame"	
2019	BJ the Chicago Kid	1123	"Time Today"	
2019	E-40	Practice Makes Paper	"1 Question"	
2020	Tinashe	Songs for You	"Know Better"	

- ^{^[a]} signifies background vocals

== Discography ==
=== Songs ===
- "Blue Laces" from The Marathon, Nipsey Hussle ft Goldiie
- "Intoxicated" from X-Tra Laps, Nipsey Hussle ft Goldiee
- "Westside" Algee Smith ft Goldiie
- "Play" Big Freedia ft Goldiie
- "Fuck What People Think" Rock Mafia ft Goldiie

=== Mixtape ===
- The Gold Rush Part. 1 (2016)

=== Other appearances ===
Title	Appearance	Year
Finalist	The Voice	2012
