= Counterfeit (disambiguation) =

A counterfeit is an imitation made with the intent to deceptively represent its content or origins, such as

- Counterfeit drug
- Counterfeit money
- Counterfeit goods

Counterfeit may also refer to:

- Counterfeit (1919 film), an American film
- Counterfeit (1936 film), an American crime film
- Counterfeit (poker), a term in community card poker
- Balance puzzle, or the counterfeit coin problem
- Counterfeit (band), an English punk rock band formed in 2015
- Counterfeit, a 2003 album by Hans-Joachim Roedelius
- Counterfeit², a 2003 album by Martin Gore
- Counterfeit EP, a 1989 EP by Martin Gore
- "Counterfeit" (song), a 1997 song by Limp Bizkit
- "Counterfeit", a song by Chris Spedding from the 1986 album Enemy Within
- "Counterfeit", a song by Chris Brown from his 2015 mixtape Before the Party, featuring Rihanna, Kelly Rowland, and Wiz Khalifa
- Counterfeit (novel), a novel by Kirstin Chen

== See also ==
- The Counterfeiters (disambiguation)
