= Body on Me =

Body on Me may refer to:

- "Body on Me" (Nelly song), 2008
- "Body on Me" (Rita Ora song), 2015
