= Royalty (Chris Brown album) =

Studio album by Chris Brown
- Released: December 18, 2015
- Recorded: 2014–15
- Studios: Record Plant (Los Angeles, California)
- Genres: R&B; alternative R&B
- Length: 51:04
- Labels: Black Pyramid; CBE; RCA
- Producers: Vinylz; Boi-1da; Dre Moon; DJ Wes; The Monsters and the Strangerz; Foreign; Teck; Khemasis; Tone Stith; Matthew Burnett; Tushar Apte; Riley Bell; Blaq Tuxedo; Tha Aristocrats; Dr3amforever; Nonfiction; Razihel; Daniele Autore; The Audibles; Poo Bear; JHawk; C.P Dubb; Composer; Don City; Derrick Beck; Free School; Danja; Allen Ritter; Polow da Don; The Aquarius; Ayo & Keyz of the Upperclassmen; Prince Chrishan; B.A.M.; A1

Chris Brown chronology
Fan of a Fan: The Album (2015)	Royalty (2015)	Heartbreak on a Full Moon (2017)

Singles from Royalty
- 1. "Liquor" Released: June 26, 2015; 2. "Zero" Released: September 18, 2015; 3. "Back to Sleep" Released: November 9, 2015; 4. "Fine by Me" Released: November 27, 2015

Royalty is the seventh studio album by American singer and songwriter Chris Brown. It was released on December 18, 2015, by CBE and RCA Records. The album was anticipated by the mixtape Before the Party, released as its prelude, and serves as the follow-up to his sixth album X (2014). The album is named after the singer's first daughter, Royalty, whom the album is dedicated to.

Royalty is mainly an R&B and alternative R&B album, while also exploring funk, pop and trap music. Brown described the lyrical content as a representation of his life experiences during that period. While collaborating with various producers on the album, it showcases the least number of guest appearances compared to his previous works. Royalty received mixed reviews from music critics.

The album debuted at number three on the US Billboard 200, selling 184,000 units in its first week, marking an improvement over Brown's last three studio albums. It also became his eighth consecutive album to debut in the top-ten in the United States. Royalty was certified Platinum by the Recording Industry Association of America (RIAA), for combined equivalent units of 1,000,000 units.

Four singles preceded the album's release: "Liquor", "Zero", "Back to Sleep", and "Fine by Me". Its third single "Back to Sleep" became the album's biggest success, peaking at number 20 on the US Billboard Hot 100. Brown directed and released eight music videos for the songs of the album, serializing them to construct a linear story.

== Background and recording ==
Brown discussed the possibility of releasing two distinct versions of the album: an urban edition tailored for the US market and a global version that would substitute some urban tracks with uptempo, pop-oriented songs. Ultimately, he decided to release the majority of these tracks on an EP titled Royalty International, opting to primarily include R&B tracks in the album.

Recording sessions for Royalty took place in late 2014 and throughout 2015 at Record Plant in Los Angeles, California. In November 2015, during an interview with Hot 97, Brown talked about the significance of the title, named after his daughter Royalty Brown:

The album is called "Royalty" because it represents where I'm at right now in my life, and my daughter is the biggest part of my life.

Brown also explained why Royalty is his album with fewer guest appearances: "this body of work had to be about me. Me getting my rhythm back into doing my thing, what I experienced during my evolution as a man into becoming a father. It's about the life that i am living right now, and i wanted to tell it by myself (...) on this album you hear what I've been through, where I'm at, and where I'm tryna go, all in one".

== Composition ==
Royalty is an R&B and alternative R&B album that encompasses funk, trap and pop music. According to Iyana Robertson of Vibe, Brown on the album "sticks to the absence of a sonic script", showcasing "a pure, palpable display of an “outside of the box” approach to music". Its lyrical content explores promiscuity, breakup, recklessness and unconditional love. Robertson said that lyrically the album "waves goodbye to amour on its way out the door", noting it to be "a stark contrast to 2014's X, which included professions of affection".

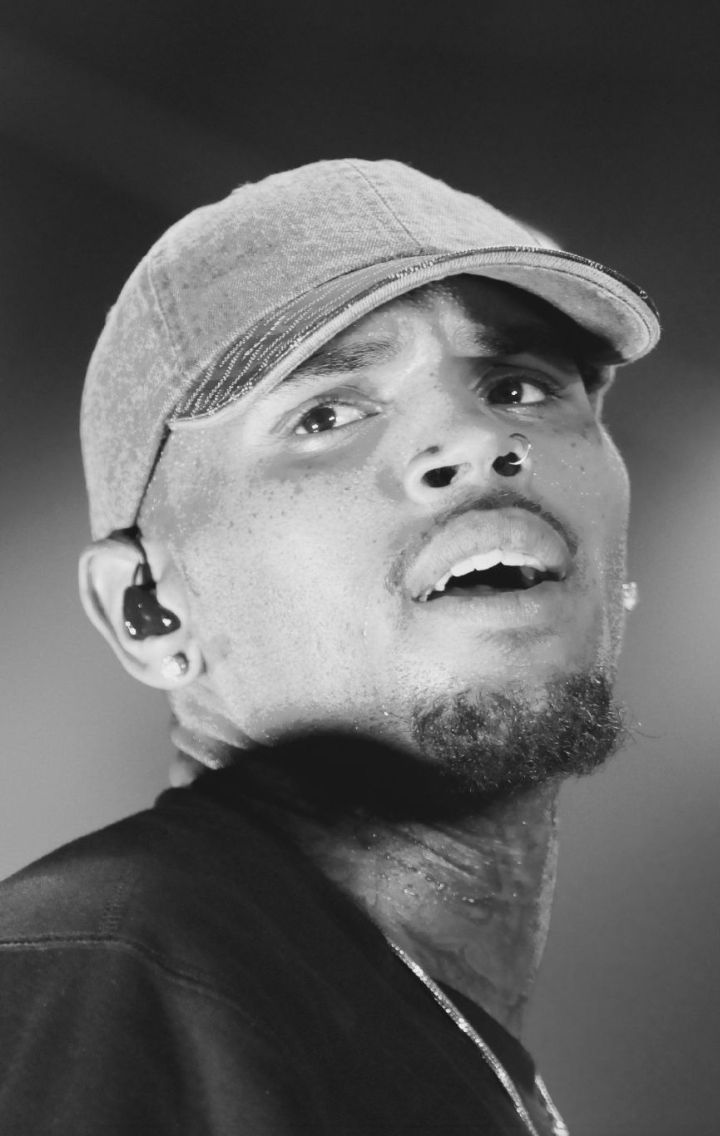
Brown in September 2015, performing in Tampa during his "One Hell of a Nite Tour".

The opening track "Back to Sleep" is an R&B slow jam about late night sex, that features beats and minor influences of funk music, reminiscent of Marvin Gaye's 1982 song "Sexual Healing". "Fine by Me" is a nu-disco song, inspired by 80s music, with lyrics about the singer feeling comfortable not being the love interest of a specific lady, but only her sex partner. "Wrist" is a trap song that also borrows from R&B and hip hop. Brad Wete of Billboard defined it as "a syrupy thumper blending hip-hop and R&B, almost serving as a Southern update of his 2011 hit “Look at Me Now”". "Make Love" is a "90s-inspired" R&B slow jam. "Zero" and "No Filter" are disco and funk records that were compared by some critics to works of American band Chic and French electronic music duo Daft Punk, with lyrics that have been described as "unapologetic". "Anyway" is a dance-pop song which features an auto-tuned chorus sung by Tayla Parx. "Picture Me Rollin’" is a G-funk song about living the thug life, featuring different references from West Coast rap. "Who's Gonna (Nobody)" is a "lascivious" R&B and alternative R&B slow-jam, that interpolates "Nobody" performed by Keith Sweat featuring Athena Cage.

"Proof" and "Discover" are alternative R&B songs, with lyrics about painful perspectives in romantic relationships. "Proof" was described by Brad Wete of Billboard as “a slow-winding tornado where [Brown] struggles to mend a relationship mangled by lies and insecurity. He's severed ties with exes and uses lines like “Whenever shit got deep, I would've drowned for you” as evidence of his dedication"”, while "Discover" was noted for its "dreamy atmosphere" and "sorrowful vocals", with Brown "futilely yearning for the second chance he doesn't deserve". The album's standard edition ends with "Little More", a pop record where the singer explains to his daughter his love for her.

"Day One" is an urban midtempo song. "KAE" is a song dedicated to the singer's ex-girlfriend, Karrueche Tran. According to Brown “The song is saying that the relationship is no more. I'm expressing the time apart and the space that's between two people who loved each other”. The last track of the deluxe edition of Royalty is "U Did It", an "atmospheric" slow alternative R&B song with elements of trap music, featuring vocals from American rapper Future.

== Artwork ==
The artwork of the album was revealed on October 16, 2015, and was shot by Italian photographer Francesco Carrozzini, portraying Brown holding his daughter Royalty in his arms while she is sleeping, in a black and white picture. The photoshoot for the album took place in October 2015, a few days prior to the announcement of the album cover. Billboard described the cover as a "tender representation of Brown's private feelings". Rap-Up said that the cover shows "a genuine intimate portrait of father and daughter".

== Release and promotion ==
In the latter months of 2014 and throughout 2015, Chris Brown shared snippets of his upcoming music by posting short videos on his social media accounts and performing unreleased tracks during club appearances. On June 25, 2015, the singer announced that his seventh album would be released during autumn 2015. The following day he released the album's lead single, titled "Liquor". On August 22, 2015, the singer revealed on his Twitter account, that his upcoming album would be titled "Royalty", in honor of his daughter (named Royalty Brown).

On October 13, 2015, Brown announced that Royalty would be released on November 27, 2015. On October 16, 2015, he revealed the album cover. After it was revealed that the album had been pushed back to December 18, 2015, in exchange on November 27, 2015, he released a free 34-track mixtape, called Before the Party, as a prelude to Royalty. The mixtape features guest appearances from Rihanna, Wiz Khalifa, Pusha T, Wale, Tyga, French Montana and Fetty Wap.

On December 3, 2015, the track "Wrist" featuring Solo Lucci was released along with an iTunes pre-order of the album. On December 11, 2015, the track "Anyway" was released as an instant grat with pre-orders. The next day, iTunes offered a preview of the first 30 seconds of each track from the album.

Brown promoted Royalty through a series of radio interviews and live performances of songs from the album on various televised shows, including Jimmy Kimmel Live!, Taraji & Terrence's White Hot Holidays Power 106 Cali Christmas 2015 and at the 3rd iHeartRadio Music Awards. Brown also did three shows leading up to the December 18 release date of Royalty, all at relatively small venues for the arena-touring singer, to promote the release. The live shows took place on December 13 at the Aragon Ballroom in Chicago, on December 16 at The Masonic in San Francisco, and on December 18 at Hollywood Palladium in Los Angeles.

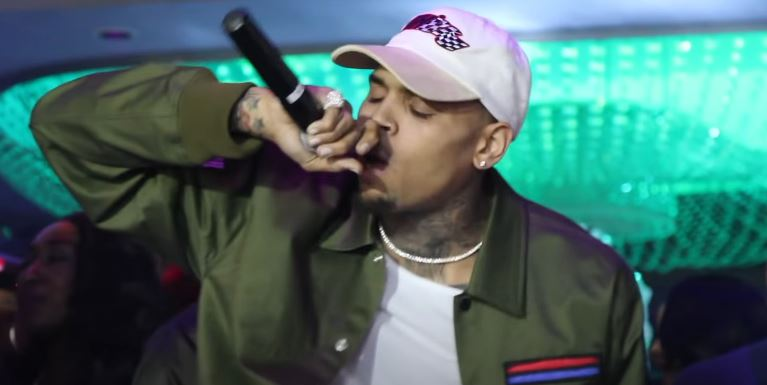
Chris Brown in January 2016 performing "Back to Sleep" in Miami.

The album was released on December 18, 2015, by CBE and RCA, in a standard edition containing 14 tracks, an international deluxe edition with four additional tracks, and a Japanese and f.y.e. deluxe edition featuring two more tracks than the international deluxe edition. On Christmas Day, the EP Royalty International was released. The four-track EP contained the two tracks that were previously exclusive to the Japanese deluxe edition.

== Singles ==
The album's lead single, "Liquor" was released on June 26, 2015. The song was produced by ToneStith. On September 22, 2015, the music video premiered, sharing along with the music video for "Zero". The song has since peaked at number 60 on the US Billboard Hot 100.

The album's second single, "Zero" was released on September 18, 2015. The song was produced by Riley Bell, Matthew Burnett and Tushar Apte. On September 22, 2015, the music video was released for "Zero", while sharing along with the music video for "Liquor". The song has since peaked at number 80 on the US Billboard Hot 100.

The song, titled "Back to Sleep" was premiered via SoundCloud on November 5, 2015. It was officially released as the album's third single on November 9, 2015. The song was produced by Vinylz and Boi-1da. On December 14, 2015, Brown uploaded and released the music video for "Back to Sleep" on his YouTube and Vevo account. The video begins, after the conclusion of Brown's "Fine By Me" music video. The song has since peaked at number 20 on the US Billboard Hot 100 making it Brown's highest-charting single from Royalty in the United States.

"Fine by Me" was released, along with the pre-order on iTunes on November 26, 2015. On the following day, it was officially released as the album's fourth single. The song was produced by The Monsters and the Strangerz. The video begins at the end of his video "Zero", and shows a clip from his other video "Liquor".

=== Other songs ===
The track "Wrist" featuring Solo Lucci, was released as part of the countdown single, with the pre-order of the album on December 4, 2015. On December 15, 2015, Brown uploaded the music video from the song.

The track "Anyway" was released as an instant grat with pre-orders on December 11, 2015. It was produced by BLAQTUXEDO and features guest appearances from Tayla Parx.

The music video for "Picture Me Rollin’" was uploaded and released on December 17, 2015. Scott Disick, French Montana, Cal Scruby, Kid Red, ASAP Ferg, and ASAP Rocky, all make their cameo appearances in this video.

On December 18, 2015, Brown uploaded the music video for "Little More (Royalty)" on his YouTube and Vevo account. The song has since peaked at number 91 on the US Billboard Hot 100.

== Music video series ==
Brown directed and released eight music videos for Royalty, serializing them to construct a linear story. Vice described the music video series as a "34-minute magnum opus". At the 2016 MTV Video Music Awards Royalty was nominated for "Breakthrough Long Form Video".

=== Plot ===
Brown in the "Liquor / Zero" music video.

Chris Brown is first seen drowning his sorrows at a bar alone when a mysterious woman buys him a drink and gives it to him after slipping a drug into it. After reluctantly drinking it, Brown loses control of his senses and leaves with the woman to her home, but Brown is under the effect of the drug and sees everything in a psychedelic way as his eyes turn temporarily neon green ("Liquor"). After the night spent with the mysterious woman, Brown hails a taxi to return home, only to find another girl he has been seeing angrily tossing his clothes off the balcony, unaware of his whereabouts. Rather than get into an argument, Brown decides to gather his boys and go out. Afterwards, he starts dancing in an alley and moves his way into a laundromat with his crew before taking the stage at a downtown theater and meeting up with Dan Bilzerian ("Zero").

After Brown leaves his crew, another woman catches his attention. He follows her to a building containing a high tech fighting arena. Suddenly, an old man's face appears on the screen and tells Brown that he owns the substance that was slipped into his drink back at the bar and wants it back via Brown's blood. Realizing he was tricked in the first place, Brown is forced to fight the old man's henchmen, but easily dispatches them with his heightened physical abilities derived from the drug and escapes, though the old man tells the second woman to follow him ("Fine By Me"). Brown then calls his girlfriend and heads over to her place, where they have sex through the night ("Back to Sleep").

Brown wakes up and goes for a walk, but is caught by the old man's henchwoman who drugs him again with a dust-like substance. In another trance-like sequence, Brown is dragged into another dark room by the henchwoman, inter-cut with clips of him and rapper Solo Lucci performing and dancing to "Wrist". She seduces him as he is tied to a chair, then tries to slit his throat, but Brown glitches out of his trap and the henchwoman is bound to the chair in his stead, allowing his escape. Brown calls his girlfriend again to try to explain everything, but she is fed up and claims she is "done", ignoring any further calls from him. She then meets another man who asks her out on a date while she works out with her friends, but the man stands her up when they are supposed to meet. Brown sees his dejected girlfriend walk into a club and with his crew's encouragement, reconciles with her inside the club and leads a dance number ("Anyway"). While Brown and his girlfriend leave, the man from earlier bumps into them and upon hearing the man call his girlfriend "love", Brown punches him, which leads to another argument resulting in Brown's girlfriend leaving him for good.

While Brown sulks, another of his friends (Scott Disick) calls him, inviting him to go to a house party, which Brown reluctantly accepts as "Picture Me Rollin'" starts to play. While Brown cheers himself up at the party, the old man himself appears and confronts Brown, saying "we can do this the easy way or the hard way". Brown's friends, including Disick, French Montana and ASAP Rocky, step in and toss the thug out while Brown escapes.

Brown is then seen tossing in his sleep inter-cut with flashbacks from the earlier videos, in addition to new footage of his girlfriend struggling to accept her pregnancy. He then wakes up in his bed and finds a toddler, revealed to be his own daughter Royalty, sitting next to him. Initially confused, he realizes the previous experiences were likely a dream and begins to play with Royalty in a musical montage ("Little More (Royalty)"), proclaiming his fatherly love for her and how she brings out the best in him. The video series ends as the same green flash in Brown's eyes from earlier appears for a second in Royalty's eyes.

== Critical reception ==
Professional ratings
Aggregate scores
Source	Rating
Metacritic	59/100
Review scores
Source	Rating
AllMusic	2.5/5 stars
Billboard	3.5/5 stars
Complex	2/5 stars
HipHopDX	2.5/5
Las Vegas Weekly	3/5 stars
USA Today	2/4 stars
Los Angeles Times	3/4 stars

According to review aggregator Metacritic, the album's average score was 59/100, indicating "mixed, or average reviews." Los Angeles Times's Mikael Wood expressed a positive response, and complimented its music as "[carrying] a convincing bad-guy energy that's all the more potent for its sweet, often luscious textures. Susan Smith of The Columbus Dispatch stated that "Royalty is a worthwhile collection, proving that in a world where “stay in your lane” is common wisdom, it doesn't exactly apply to people such as Brown, who have a few lanes to choose from".

Brad Wete of Billboard affirmed that "“Proof”-like cuts prove Brown can make quality songs about relationship dynamics (...) And he probably should, for the sake of a well-rounded output. (...) Admittedly, a rich 26-year-old bachelor's life is full of romps with women and wild nights. Fame, access, and talent bring those with ease. This seems to be an art imitating life thing. But if and when Brown ascends to the next level, it likely will be because he starts talking about the morning after. It's time for him to wake up." AllMusic editor Andy Kellman expressed a mixed response saying that the album "is not a farther away from the X-rated material full of carousing and belligerence that have dominated his work since Exclusive, as the cover might've suggested", and stated that the majority of Royalty "is a qualitative step back from previous solo album X."

Marcus Dowling of HipHopDX wrote that "While showing progression here, Chris Brown still is quite far from being the best man and artist that he can be." HotNewHipHop argued that "Royalty has the lushness of the best R&B records, and some of the sensibility. Unfortunately, he's still spouting lines and repping an ideology that's a better fit for emotionally barren clubs on the Vegas strip than an intimate venue or bedroom." Michael Arcenhaux of Complex started off the review saying that if he had one word to describe the album "it would be mistake", and that "Royalty is many things all at once though much of it is not particularly good."

=== Awards and nominations ===
Awards and nominations for Royalty
Year	Ceremony	Category	Result	Ref.
2016	Billboard Music Awards	Top R&B Album	Nominated	
2016	MTV Video Music Awards	Breakthrough Long Form Video	Nominated	

== Commercial performance ==
Royalty debuted at number three on the US Billboard 200 selling 184,000 equivalent copies (162,000 in pure album sales) behind Justin Bieber's Purpose and 25 by Adele. It was the second best-selling album of the week. The album was Brown's sixth solo album to debut at number one on the Billboard Top R&B/Hip-Hop Albums. Royalty was also streamed 17.3 million times in the first week. The album debuted at number 23 on the UK Albums Chart and number-one on the UK R&B Chart, becoming Brown's fifth number-one on that chart.

The sales for Royalty marked an improvement over Brown's last three studio albums, with the former two peaking higher, but selling less in their first week's of release, while the collaboration with Tyga sold 51,000 copies in its first week, peaking at number 7. Despite having greater first week sales than his three previous albums, this is his third-lowest peak position for one of his solo studio albums. In its second week, the album remained in the top ten at Billboard 200, fell to number 8, selling 55,000 equivalent copies (36,000 in pure album sales). In its third week, the album dropped down to number 12 on the chart, selling 29,000 equivalent copies (17,000 in pure album sales). In the fourth week the album fell to number 14 on the Billboard 200 chart, selling 23,000 equivalent copies (12,000 in pure album sales). The album sold 19,000 copies (10,000 in pure album sales) in its fifth week. As of March 2016, Royalty has sold 360,000 copies in the United States. Royalty was certified platinum by the Recording Industry Association of America (RIAA), for combined album sales, on-demand audio, video streams, track sales equivalent of 1,000,000 units.

== Track listing ==
Credits adapted from the album's liner notes.

Royalty — CD – digital download – streaming
No.	Title	Writer(s)	Producer(s)	Length
1.	"Back to Sleep"	Chris Brown; August Rigo	Vinylz; Ritter^{[a]}; Boi-1da^{[a]}	3:21
2.	"Fine by Me"	Brown; Sean Douglas; Talay Riley	The Monsters and the Strangerz; Kirkpatrick	3:27
3.	"Wrist" (featuring Solo Lucci)	Brown; Floyd Bentley; Christopher Dotson; Lyrica Anderson; Michael McIntosh	Foreign Teck; Khemasis; Prince Chrishan; A1 Bentley	3:14
4.	"Make Love"	Brown; Melvin Villanueva; Rian Beriones	Tone Stith	3:50
5.	"Liquor"	Brown; Stith	Tone Stith; The Aquarius	3:44
6.	"Zero"	Brown; Douglas; Riley	Burnett; Apte; Bell^{[b]}	3:34
7.	"Anyway" (featuring Tayla Parx)	Brown; Lisa Scinta; Taylor Parks; Andrew Hey; Barry Bradford	Blaq Tuxedo	3:31
8.	"Picture Me Rollin'"	Brown	Dr3amforever; DJ-Wes	3:13
9.	"Who's Gonna (Nobody)"	Brown	B.A.M.	4:33
10.	"Discover"	Brown; Jocelyn Donald; Dewain Whitmore; Steven Rehbein	Danja; Polow da Don	4:25
11.	"Little Bit"	Brown; Bentley; Gabrielle Nowee; Anderson	Blaq Tuxedo	2:45
12.	"Proof"	Brown; Bryson Tiller; Donald DeGrate	Ayo; Keyz	4:01
13.	"No Filter"	Brown; Josh Cumbee; Mark Pitts; Nat Dunn; Ilan Kidron	Nonfiction	3:06
14.	"Little More (Royalty)"	Brown; Boyd; Jordan; Giannos; Nicolò Arquilla; Daniele Autore	The Audibles; Poo Bear; Max Borghetti; Razihel; Daniele Autore	4:20
Total length:				51:04

Royalty — Deluxe edition (bonus tracks)
No.	Title	Writer(s)	Producer(s)	Length
15.	"Day One"	Brown	JHawk; C.P Dubb	4:07
16.	"Blow It in the Wind"	Brown; Shanell Woodgett; Natalie Sims; Keith Thomas; Pitts	The Composer	4:08
17.	"KAE"	Brown	Don City; Beck	3:34
18.	"U Did It" (featuring Future)	Brown; Ngandu Kabamba; Nayvadius Wilburn	Dre Moon	3:33
Total length:				66:26

Royalty — Japanese and f.y.e. deluxe edition (bonus tracks)
No.	Title	Writer(s)	Producer(s)	Length
19.	"The 80s"	Brown	Free School	4:25
20.	"Blue Jeans"	Brown	The Futuristics; Finatik N Zac; Jim Jonsin	3:05
Total length:				73:56

Notes

- ^{^[a]} signifies a co-producer
- ^{^[b]} signifies an additional producer
- "Back to Sleep" features background vocals from August Rigo
- "Fine by Mine" and "Zero" feature background vocals from Talay Riley
- "Anyway" features additional vocals from Taylor Parks
- "No Filter" features background vocals from Josh Cumbee, Ilan Kidron, Afshin Salmani, Nat Dunn and Terrence Coles

Sample credits

- "Picture Me Rollin’" contains elements of "Regulate", written by Warren Griffin II, Nathaniel Hale, Jerry Leiber, Mike Stoller and performed by Nate Dogg featuring Warren G, and "Funk You Up", written by Gwendolyn Chisolm, Cheryl Cook, Sylvia Robinson, Angela Stone and performed by The Sequence.
- "Who's Gonna (Nobody)" contains elements of "Nobody", written by Scott Fitzgerald, Keith Sweat and performed by Keith Sweat featuring Athena Cage.
- "Discover" contains elements of "Little City Slikers", written by Steven Rehbein, Richard Braun and performed by Auracle.
- "Proof" contains elements of "My Heart Belongs to U", written by Donald DeGrate, Cedric Hailey and performed by Jodeci.

== Personnel ==
Credits for Royalty adapted from Allmusic.

- Chris Brown – composer, creative director, executive producer, primary artist
- Afsheen – producer
- Lyrica Anderson – composer
- Tushar Apte – composer, drum Programming, keyboards, producer
- Aquarius – producer
- The Aristocrats – programming
- Nicolò Arquilla – composer
- Daniele Autore – composer, producer
- Ayọ – producer
- B.A.M. – producer
- Riley Bell – additional production, composer
- Adrian Bent – guitar (bass)
- Floyd Bentley – composer, producer
- Rian Glen Beriones – composer
- Andre "Drenative" Blake – composer
- Boi Ida – producer
- Jason Boyd – composer
- Barry "Mijo" Bradford – composer
- Richard Braun – composer
- Matthew Burnett – composer, drum programming, keyboards, producer
- Francesco Carrozzini – photography
- Maddox Chhim – assistant
- Cheryl Cook – composer
- Tom Coyne – mastering
- Josh Cumbee – composer, engineer, guitar, keyboards, producer, programming, vocals (background)
- Terrence De Carlo Coles – composer
- Wesley "Dj Wes" Dees – composer
- Donald Degrate – composer
- DJ Wes – producer
- Jocelyn a. Donald – composer
- Michael Dorsey – composer
- Christopher Dotson – composer, producer
- Sean Douglas – composer
- Nat Dunn – vocals (background)
- Natalie Dunn – composer
- Kenneth Edmonds – composer
- Scott Fitzgerald – composer
- Askia Fountain – composer
- James Foye III – composer
- Kenneth "K-Smack" Franklin – composer
- Chris Galland – assistant
- Jimmy Giannos – composer
- Edward Griffin – composer
- Warren Griffin III – composer
- Cedric Hailey – composer
- Anderson Hernandez – composer
- Michael Hernandez – composer, producer
- Andrew Hey – composer
- Nate Hills – composer
- Brandon Hodge – composer
- Chaz Jackson – composer
- Jaycen Joshua – mixing
- Jordan Johnson – composer
- Stefan Johnson – composer, engineer
- Jamal Jones – composer
- Dominic Jordan – composer
- Ryan Kaul – assistant
- Ilan Kidron – composer, vocals (background)
- Chris King – engineer
- Ian Kirkpatrick – composer, producer, programming
- Jerry Leiber – composer
- Darius Logan – composer
- Dominique Logan – composer
- Marcus Lomax – composer
- The Mekanics – producer
- The Monsters – producer, programming
- Caleb Nordelus – composer, producer
- Gabrielle "Goldie" Nowee – composer
- Austin Owens – composer
- Taylor Parks – composer, vocals, featured artist
- Mark Pitts – composer, executive producer
- Polow da Don – producer
- Poo Bear – producer
- JHawk – producer
- Razihel – producer
- Steven Rehbein – composer
- August Rigo – composer, vocals (background)
- Talay Riley – composer, vocals (background)
- Allen Ritter – composer, producer
- Afshin Salmani – composer, engineer, keyboards, programming, vocals (background)
- Omega Sampson – composer
- Matthew Samuels – composer
- Ike Schultz – assistant
- Lisa Scinta – composer
- Darryl Simmons – composer
- Natalie Sims – composer
- Aaron Lamont Small – composer
- Solo Lucci – featured artist
- Brian Springer Vocal – engineer
- Antonio "Tone" Stith – composer, producer
- Mike Stoller – composer
- Angela Stone – composer
- Strangerz – producer, programming
- Keith Sweat – composer
- T-Coles – vocals (background)
- Keith Thomas – A&R
- Bryson Tiller – composer
- Bobby Joseph Turner, Jr. – composer
- Blaq Tuxedo – producer
- Keyz of the Upperclassmen – producer
- Melvin Villanueva – composer
- Vinylz – producer
- Courtney Walter – art direction, creative director, design
- Irvin Whitlow – composer
- Dewain Whitmore, Jr. – composer
- Orlando Williamson – composer

== Charts ==
=== Weekly charts ===
Weekly chart performance for Royalty
Chart (2015–2016)	Peak position
Australian Albums (ARIA)	14
Australian Urban Albums (ARIA)	2
Austrian Albums (Ö3 Austria)	54
Belgian Albums (Ultratop Flanders)	48
Belgian Albums (Ultratop Wallonia)	85
Canadian Albums (Billboard)	17
Danish Albums (Hitlisten)	26
Dutch Albums (Album Top 100)	21
French Albums (SNEP)	81
German Albums (Offizielle Top 100)	37
Irish Albums (IRMA)	51
Japanese Albums (Oricon)	32
Japanese Hot Albums (Billboard Japan)	22
New Zealand Albums (RMNZ)	16
Norwegian Albums (VG-lista)	36
Scottish Albums (Official Charts)	45
South African Albums (RISA)	15
South Korean Albums (Circle)	96
Spanish Albums (Promusicae)	57
Swedish Albums (Sverigetopplistan)	46
Swiss Albums (Schweizer Hitparade)	15
UK Albums (Official Charts)	23
UK R&B Albums (Official Charts)	1
US Billboard 200	3
US Top R&B/Hip-Hop Albums (Billboard)	1

=== Year-end charts ===
2015 year-end chart performance for Royalty
Chart (2015)	Position
Australian Urban Albums (ARIA)	14

2016 year-end chart performance for Royalty
Chart (2016)	Position
Australian Urban Albums (ARIA)	20
US Billboard 200	39
US Top R&B/Hip-Hop Albums (Billboard)	7

2017 year-end chart performance for Royalty
Chart (2017)	Position
Australian Urban Albums (ARIA)	98

== Certifications ==
Certifications for Royalty
Region	Certification	Certified units/sales
Australia (ARIA)	Gold	35,000^{‡}
New Zealand (RMNZ)	2× Platinum	30,000^{‡}
South Africa (RISA)	Gold	25,000^{‡}
United Kingdom (BPI)	Gold	100,000^{‡}
United States (RIAA)	Platinum	1,000,000^{‡}
^{‡} Sales+streaming figures based on certification alone.

== Release history ==
Release dates and formats for Royalty
Region	Date	Label	Format(s)
United Kingdom	December 18, 2015	RCA	CD; digital download
United States	December 18, 2015	RCA	CD; digital download

== See also ==
- List of UK R&B Albums Chart number ones of 2015
- List of Billboard number-one R&B/hip-hop albums of 2016
