= Before the Party (disambiguation) =

Before the Party is a mixtape by Chris Brown released in 2015.

Before the Party may also refer to:

- "Before the Party" (short story), a short story in the collection The Casuarina Tree (1926), by W. Somerset Maugham
  - Before the Party (play) (1949), an adaptation of the short story for theatre by Rodney Ackland
  - Before the Party (TV series) (1969), a TV series based on Maugham's story
