= The Counterfeiters =

The Counterfeiters or Counterfeiters may refer to:

- The Counterfeiters (novel), a 1925 novel by André Gide
- Counterfeiters (1940 film), a German film
- The Counterfeiters (1948 film), an American film directed by Sam Newfield
- The Counterfeiters (1951 film), an Italian film directed by Franco Rossi
- The Counterfeiters (2007 film), a 2007 film written and directed by Stefan Ruzowitzky
- The Counterfeiters (2010 film), a 2010 film based on the Gide novel
- Counterfeiters (2017 film), a 2017 film written, directed by, and starring Bryce Hirschberg

== See also ==
- Counterfeit (disambiguation)
