= Royalty International =

Royalty International – EP

EP by Chris Brown
- Released: December 25, 2015
- Recorded: 2015
- Genres: Tropical house; disco
- Length: 17:50
- Labels: RCA; CBE
- Producers: Scott Storch; Will Lobban-Bean; Alexander Isaak; Free School; The Futuristics; FNZ; Jim Jonson

Chris Brown chronology
Royalty (2015)	Royalty International – EP (2015)	Heartbreak on a Full Moon (2017)

Royalty International – EP is an extended play by American singer Chris Brown. It was released on Christmas Day, by RCA Records. At first it was available only for digital download in United Kingdom, Ireland, New Zealand, Canada and Australia, later it was released worldwide on every streaming platform.

== Background ==
Initially, Brown's intention was to release two different versions of his seventh studio album, Royalty, including an "international" version where some R&B tracks were replaced by uptempo pop-leaning songs, but eventually the international version was scrapped, and he ended up releasing some of these tracks on an EP titled Royalty International.

== Track listing ==
Royalty International – EP
No.	Title	Writer(s)	Producer(s)	Length
1.	"Blood On My Hands"	Brown; Jean Baptiste	Gorgon City; Jon Redwine	4:02
2.	"Shattered"	Brown; Daniel 'Draydel' Sado	Scott Storch; Diego Ave	3:04
3.	"Lonely Dancer"	Brown	Cook Classics; Alexander Isaak	3:14
4.	"The 80's"	Brown	Jean Baptiste; The Monsters and the Strangerz	4:25
5.	"Blue Jeans"	Brown	The Futuristics; FNZ; Jim Jonson	3:05
Total length:				17:50
