= Kirstin Chen =

Singaporean writer

Kirsten Chen
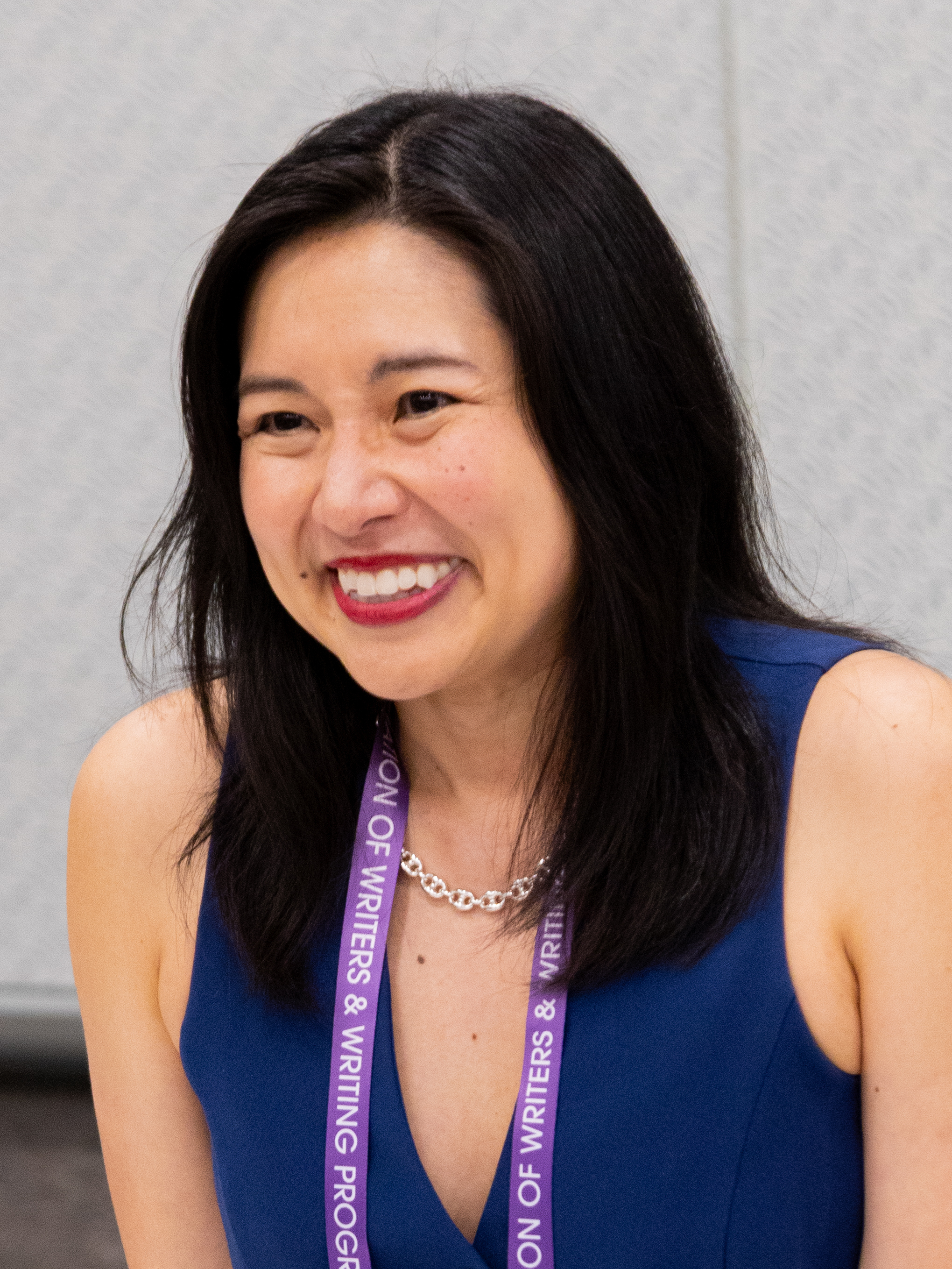
- Chen in 2025
- Born: Singapore
- Education: Stanford University; Emerson College
- Occupation: Writer
- Writing career
- Notable works: Soy Sauce for Beginners; Bury What We Cannot Take
- Website: kirstinchen.com

Kirstin Chen is a Singaporean writer.

== Early life and education ==
Chen was born and raised in Singapore. She moved to the United States at age 15 to attend boarding school, then attended Stanford University, where she earned her Bachelor of Arts. She has a Master of Fine Arts degree from Emerson College.

== Career ==
Chen teaches creative writing at the University of San Francisco and has taught on Ashland University's low-residency MFA program.

== Works ==
Chen's first novel, Soy Sauce for Beginners, was an editors pick at O, The Oprah Magazine, the novel tells the story of a young Singaporean Chinese woman living in the United States who returns to Singapore to help the family soy sauce business.

Chen's second novel, Bury What We Cannot Take, published in 2018 by Little A/Amazon Publishing, relates the stories of three generations of a family set against the backdrop of 1950s Maoist China. The novel was named among "best fiction of 2018" by Entropy and "best historical fiction of 2018" by BookBub.

== Bibliography ==
- Soy Sauce for Beginners, New Harvest, 2014.
- Bury What We Cannot Take, Little A, 2018.
- Counterfeit : a novel, William Morrow, New York, NY, 2022. ISBN 9780063119543
