= Soy Sauce for Beginners =

2014 novel by Kirstin Chen

- Author: Kirstin Chen
- Language: English
- Genre: Domestic fiction
- Publisher: New Harvest
- Publication date: 7 January 2014
- ISBN: 0544114396
- OCLC: 875632618

Soy Sauce for Beginners is a novel by Singaporean author Kirstin Chen. Her debut novel, it follows Gretchen Lin, a 30-year-old Singaporean woman who has spent the past fifteen years living in San Francisco, as she returns to her home country to help run her family's artisanal soy sauce factory.

== Reception ==
Courtney Ophoff of the Booklist wrote: "Foodies will appreciate the behind-the-scenes look at the world of artisanal soy sauce, while others will enjoy Chen's tribute to her native Singapore." Akshita Nanda of The Straits Times gave the novel a 3 out of 5 rating and called it "predictable yet satisfying" and an "assured debut novel as light and flavourful as the condiment spicing its pages." Chloe Krug Benjamin of the Washington Independent Review of Books opined that while Chen's writing is "more straightforward than surprising, and occasionally, Gretchen's moments of introspection feel unnecessarily explanatory", the pacing is "excellent", the novel is mostly a "dialogue-based page-turner" and Chen "brings the novel's many plot lines to a skillful, if foreseeable, close." Kirkus Reviews called the novel "readable but lightweight" and "short on depth and complexity".
