= Bury What We Cannot Take =

2018 novel by Kirstin Chen

- Author: Kirstin Chen
- Language: English
- Genre: Historical fiction
- Publisher: Little A
- Publication date: 29 March 2018
- ISBN: 1542049709
- OCLC: 1027219036

Bury What We Cannot Take is a novel by Singaporean author Kirstin Chen. Set in the late 1950s, when China was under Maoist rule, the novel follows nine-year-old San San, whose mother Seok Koon plans for the family's escape from China, where her estranged husband lives. However, when the family falls under greater scrutiny from the government, Seok Koon can only obtain travel permits for one child, forcing her to leave San San behind temporarily and figure out some other way to rescue her.

== Reception ==
Entropy included the novel on its "Best of 2018: Best Fiction Books" list, stating: "Against the backdrop of early Maoist China, this captivating and emotional tale follows a brother, a sister, a father, and a mother as they grapple with their agonizing decision, its far-reaching consequences, and their hope for redemption." Fan Wu of the San Francisco Chronicle wrote: "Though we the reader may yearn for a richer political and social landscape and a more convincing ending in Chen’s book, it provides a rare glimpse into the little-documented history of such people during Mao's era." Publishers Weekly called it "evocative" and a "fascinating family portrait." Amanda Winterroth of the Booklist called it an "engaging, if uneven, portrait of China in the late 1950s during the rise of Maoism." Kirkus Reviews called the novel a "modestly engaging, well-researched historical novel of Communist China that fails to fulfill its potential"
