= 2016 iHeartRadio Music Awards =

US music awards ceremony in 2016

- Date: April 3, 2016
- Location: The Forum, Inglewood
- Hosted by: Jason Derulo

Highlights
- Most awards: Taylor Swift (4)
- Most nominations: Taylor Swift and The Weeknd (7)

Television/radio coverage
- Network: TBS, TNT and truTV

The 2016 iHeartRadio Music Awards was the third music award show presented by iHeartMedia's platform iHeartRadio and was televised live on TBS, TNT and truTV. The awards was held on April 3, 2016, at The Forum in Inglewood, California, and was hosted by American singer Jason Derulo.

Taylor Swift and The Weeknd led the nominations with seven categories, followed by Adele with five nominations.

== Performers ==
Artist(s)	Song(s)
Jason Derulo	"If It Ain't Love"
Justin Bieber	"Love Yourself" "Company"
Meghan Trainor	"No"
Fetty Wap	"Again"
Pitbull	"Fireball" (live from the 2016 NCAA March Madness Music Festival)
Chris Brown	"Liquor" "Back to Sleep" "Wrist" "Anyway"
Demi Lovato; Brad Paisley (on guitar)	"Stone Cold"
DNCE; Nile Rodgers (on guitar)	"Cake by the Ocean" "Le Freak"
G-Eazy; Bebe Rexha	"Me, Myself & I"
Maroon 5	"Animals" (live from the 2016 NCAA March Madness Music Festival)
ZAYN	"Like I Would"
The Weeknd	"Acquainted" (live from the 2016 Juno Awards)
Iggy Azalea	"Team"

== Presenters ==
- Justin Timberlake — presented Best Tour to Taylor Swift
- Pharrell Williams — presented the Innovator Award to U2
- Diplo — introduced Chris Brown
- Meagan Good — introduced Meghan Trainor
- Pete Wentz — presented Biggest Triple Threat
- 2 Chainz — presented R&B Artist of the Year
- Julianne Hough— presented Dance Artist of the Year
- Trey Songz — presented Song of the Year
- Kelly Osbourne — introduced Demi Lovato
- Zendaya — introduced Zayn
- Selena Gomez — presented Album of the Year
- Wiz Khalifa
- Big Sean
- Derek Hough
- Kat Graham
- Demi Lovato — introduced Iggy Azalea

== Winners and nominees ==
The nominees were announced on February 9, 2016. Winners are listed first and highlighted in boldface.

Song of the Year	Female Artist of the Year
**"Hello" – Adele**; "Blank Space" – Taylor Swift; "Can't Feel My Face" – The Weeknd; "Shut Up and Dance" – Walk the Moon; "Uptown Funk" – Mark Ronson featuring Bruno Mars	**Taylor Swift**; Adele; Selena Gomez; Meghan Trainor; Carrie Underwood
Male Artist of the Year	Best New Artist
**Justin Bieber**; Luke Bryan; Ed Sheeran; Sam Smith; The Weeknd	**Fetty Wap**; Hozier; Sam Hunt; Shawn Mendes; Tove Lo
Best Duo/Group of the Year	Album of the Year
**Maroon 5**; Fall Out Boy; One Direction; Walk the Moon; Zac Brown Band	**1989 – Taylor Swift**; 25 – Adele; Beauty Behind the Madness – The Weeknd; In the Lonely Hour – Sam Smith; × – Ed Sheeran
Best Tour	Alternative Rock Artist of the Year
**Taylor Swift - The 1989 World Tour**; Garth Brooks - The Garth Brooks World Tour; Luke Bryan - Kick the Dust Up Tour; Foo Fighters - Sonic Highways World Tour; U2 - Innocence + Experience Tour	**Twenty One Pilots**; AWOLNATION; Foo Fighters; Muse; X Ambassadors
Alternative Rock Song of the Year	Rock Artist of the Year
**"Stressed Out" – Twenty One Pilots**; "Cigarette Daydreams" – Cage The Elephant; "Ex's & Oh's" – Elle King; "Renegades" – X Ambassadors; "Shut Up and Dance" – Walk the Moon	**Foo Fighters**; Breaking Benjamin; Disturbed; Five Finger Death Punch; Three Days Grace
Rock Song of the Year	Country Song of the Year
**"Heavy Is the Head" – Zac Brown Band featuring Chris Cornell**; "Cut the Cord" – Shinedown; "Failure" – Breaking Benjamin; "Footsteps" – Pop Evil; "I Am Machine" – Three Days Grace	**"Buy Me a Boat" – Chris Janson**; "Homegrown" – Zac Brown Band; "I See You" – Luke Bryan; "Lose My Mind" – Brett Eldredge; "Take Your Time" – Sam Hunt
Country Artist of the Year	Dance Song of the Year
**Luke Bryan**; Sam Hunt; Brad Paisley; Blake Shelton; Thomas Rhett	**"Where Are Ü Now" – Skrillex & Diplo with Justin Bieber**; "Hey Mama" – David Guetta featuring Nicki Minaj, Bebe Rexha & Afrojack; "Lean On" – Major Lazer & DJ Snake featuring MØ; "Waves" – Mr. Probz; "You Know You Like It" – DJ Snake & AlunaGeorge
Dance Artist of the Year	Hip Hop Song of the Year
**Calvin Harris**; David Guetta; Major Lazer; Skrillex & Diplo; Zedd	**"Hotline Bling" – Drake**; "Blessings" – Big Sean featuring Drake & Kanye West; "Flex (Ooh, Ooh, Ooh)" – Rich Homie Quan; "Trap Queen" – Fetty Wap; "Truffle Butter" – Nicki Minaj featuring Drake & Lil Wayne
Hip Hop Artist of the Year	R&B Song of the Year
**Drake**; Big Sean; Fetty Wap; Future; J. Cole	**"Earned It" – The Weeknd**; "Bitch Better Have My Money" – Rihanna; "Planez" – Jeremih featuring J. Cole; "Post to Be" – Omarion featuring Chris Brown & Jhene Aiko; "The Hills" – The Weeknd
R&B Artist of the Year	Latin Song of the Year
**Chris Brown**; Beyoncé; The Weeknd; Trey Songz; Usher	**"El Perdón" – Nicky Jam & Enrique Iglesias**; "Ay Vamos" – J Balvin; "Hilito" – Romeo Santos; "La Gozadera" – Gente De Zona featuring Marc Anthony; "Mi Verdad" – Maná featuring Shakira
Latin Artist of the Year	Regional Mexican Song of the Year
**Pitbull**; Enrique Iglesias; J Balvin; Nicky Jam; Prince Royce	**"Levantando Polvadera" – Voz de Mando**; "Aunque Ahora Estés Con Él" – Calibre 50; "Eres Una Niña" – Gerardo Ortiz; "Mi Vicio Más Grande" – Banda El Recodo de Cruz Lizárraga; "Te Mestiste" – Ariel Camacho y Los Plebes del Rancho
Regional Mexican Artist of the Year	Best Lyrics
**Banda Los Recoditos**; Calibre 50; Gerardo Ortiz; Julión Álvarez y Su Norteño Banda; Voz De Mando	**"Fight Song" – Rachel Platten**; "Die a Happy Man" – Thomas Rhett; "Hello" – Adele; "Photograph" – Ed Sheeran; "See You Again" – Wiz Khalifa featuring Charlie Puth
Best Collaboration	Best Cover Song
**"Uptown Funk" – Mark Ronson featuring Bruno Mars**; "Bad Blood" – Taylor Swift featuring Kendrick Lamar; "Like I'm Gonna Lose You" – Meghan Trainor featuring John Legend; "See You Again" – Wiz Khalifa featuring Charlie Puth; "Where Are Ü Now" – Skrillex & Diplo with Justin Bieber	**"Uptown Funk" – Fifth Harmony, Jasmine V, Jacob Whitesides and** **Mahogany Lox covering Mark Ronson featuring Bruno Mars**; 1989 (Album in full) – Ryan Adams covering Taylor Swift; "Bad Blood" – Alessia Cara covering Taylor Swift; "Bitch Better Have My Money" – Kelly Clarkson covering Rihanna; "Cheerleader" – Pentatonix covering Omi; "Hands To Myself/Sorry" – Troye Sivan covering Selena Gomez and Justin Bieber; "Hello" – Demi Lovato covering Adele; "Hotline Bling" – Justin Bieber covering Drake; "Hotline Bling" – Sam Smith & Disclosure covering Drake; "Trap Queen" – Ed Sheeran covering Fetty Wap
Best Song from a Movie	Biggest Triple Threat
**"Til It Happens to You" – Lady Gaga (The Hunting Ground)**; "Earned It" – The Weeknd (Fifty Shades of Grey); "Love Me Like You Do" – Ellie Goulding (Fifty Shades of Grey); "See You Again" – Wiz Khalifa featuring Charlie Puth (Furious 7); "Writing's on the Wall" – Sam Smith (Spectre)	**Selena Gomez – Singer/Actor/Dancer**; Lady Gaga – Singer/Actor/Activist; Hailee Steinfeld – Singer/Actor/Model; Jason Derulo – Singer/Host/Dancer; Jennifer Lopez – Singer/Actor/Dancer; Justin Timberlake – Singer/Actor/Dancer; Nick Jonas – Singer/Actor/Model; Troye Sivan – Singer/Actor/YouTuber; Usher – Singer/Actor/Dancer; Zendaya – Singer/Actor/Dancer
Most Meme-able Moment	Best Fan Army
**Taylor Swift's "Crazy Girl" with Running Mascara (from "Blank Space" video)**; Adele and "Hello" memes (Lionel Richie, Miss Piggy); Drake and "Hotline Bling"; Katy Perry and the Left Shark (from Super Bowl 49); Kanye West and Kanye For President / Kanye 2020	**Justin Bieber – Beliebers**; 5 Seconds of Summer – 5SOSFam; Fifth Harmony – Harmonizers; Ariana Grande – Arianators; Selena Gomez – Selenators; Adam Lambert – Glamberts; Demi Lovato – Lovatics; Little Mix – Mixers; Shawn Mendes – Mendes Army; Nicki Minaj – Barbz; One Direction – Directioners; Taylor Swift – Swifties
iHeartRadio Innovator Award
**U2**

== Changes ==
Taylor Swift and The Weeknd were nominated for the inaugural Female and Male Artist of the Year categories (the previous two years featured simply Artist of the Year). Swift was the big winner of the night with four awards, including Best Tour and Album of the Year.

Out of the 29 categories, the awards also feature 7 fan-voted categories including Best Fan Army, Best Lyrics and Best Collaboration, as well as four new categories: Best Cover Song, Best Song from a Movie, Biggest Triple Threat and Most Meme-Able Moment. Voting took place via the iHeartRadio website from February 9 through March 25, except for Fan Army and Meme-Able Moment, which continued through the evening of the awards on April 3.
