= Picture Me Rollin' =

Song by Chris Brown

from the album Royalty
- Recorded: 2015
- Studio: Record Plant (Los Angeles, California)
- Genre: G-funk
- Length: 3:13
- Label: RCA
- Songwriters: Christopher Brown; Andre "Drenative" Blake; Gabrielle "Goldiie" Nowee; Cheryl Cook; Wesley "Dj Wes" Dees; Kenneth "K-Smack" Franklin; Edward Griffin; Warren Griffin III; Jerry Leiber; Aaron Lamont Small; Mike Stoller; Angela Stone
- Producers: Dj Wes, Dr3amforever

Music video
- "Picture Me Rollin'" on YouTube

"Picture Me Rollin'" is a song by American singer Chris Brown, from his seventh studio album Royalty. It was written by Brown, and produced by Dr3amforever and Dj-Wes.

"Picture Me Rollin'" garnered positive reviews from music critics, who noted it as one of the album's highlights, praising its G-funk sound. The song peaked at number 50 on the US Hot R&B/Hip-Hop Songs chart. Its music video, shot in Brown's Los Angeles mansion, was released on December 17, 2015, and is part of the Royalty music videos storyline.

== Composition ==
"Picture Me Rollin'" is a G-funk song about living the thug life, featuring different references from West Coast rap. Brown's vocal performance on the track mostly showcases his singing, having some rapped background vocals and ad-libs, switching to an auto-tuned rap verse at the end. According to HotNewHipHop, the song's production mixes G-funk with elements of DJ Mustard's production style. The track was entirely written by Brown, and produced by Dr3amforever and DJ-Wes. It contains elements of "Regulate" by Warren G and Nate Dogg, from the former's album Regulate...G Funk Era (1994), and "Funk You Up" (1979) by The Sequence, for which the artists are credited as writers.

== Critical reception ==
"Picture Me Rollin'" received positive reviews from music critics. Mike Pizzo of Las Vegas Weekly said that the song is the best one on Royalty. Jesse Cataldo of Slant Magazine described it as "catchy", calling it a revival of 90s G-funk. Marcus Dowling of HipHopDX praised the "gangsta vibe" of the song, comparing it to works by American rapper 2Pac.

== Music video ==
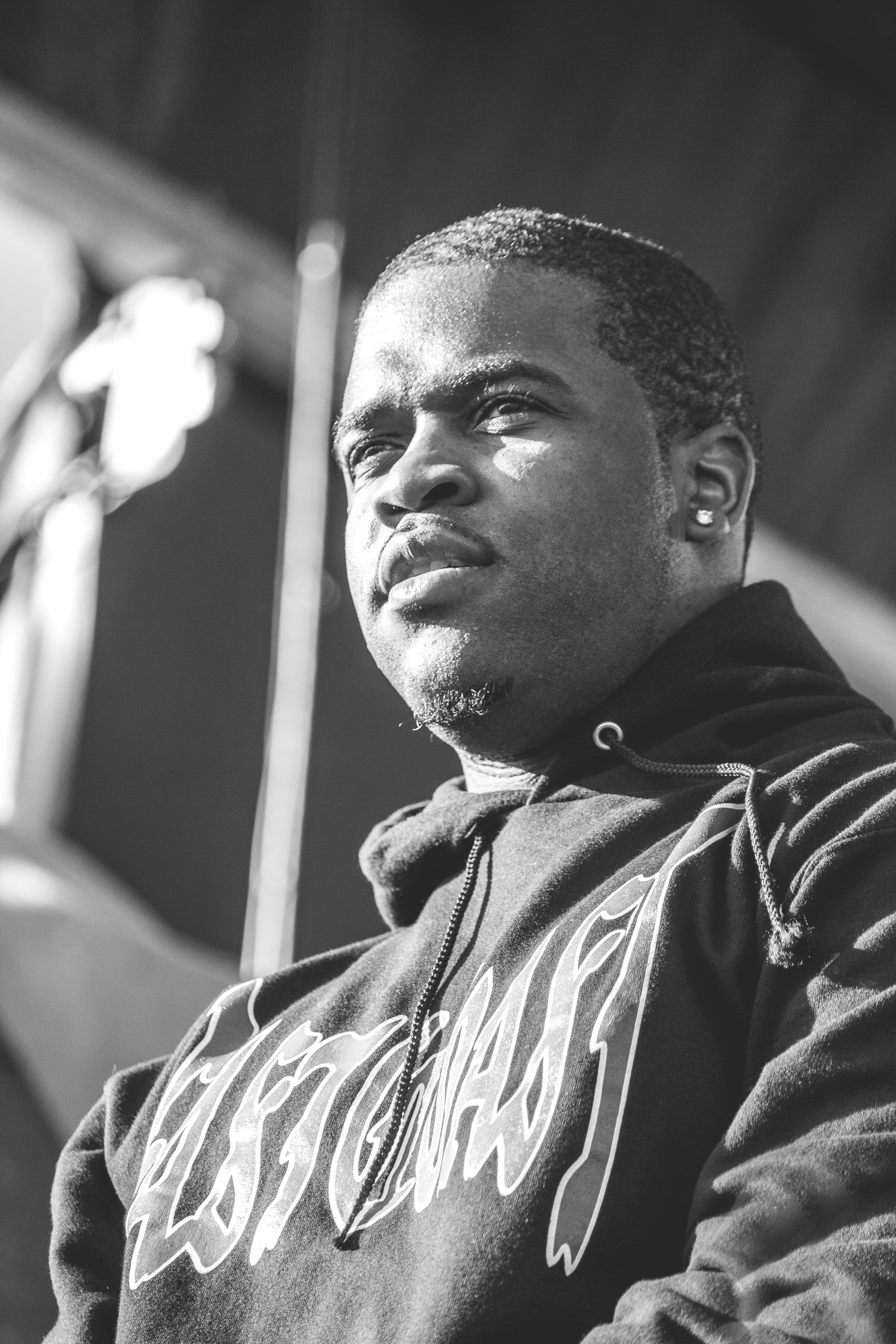
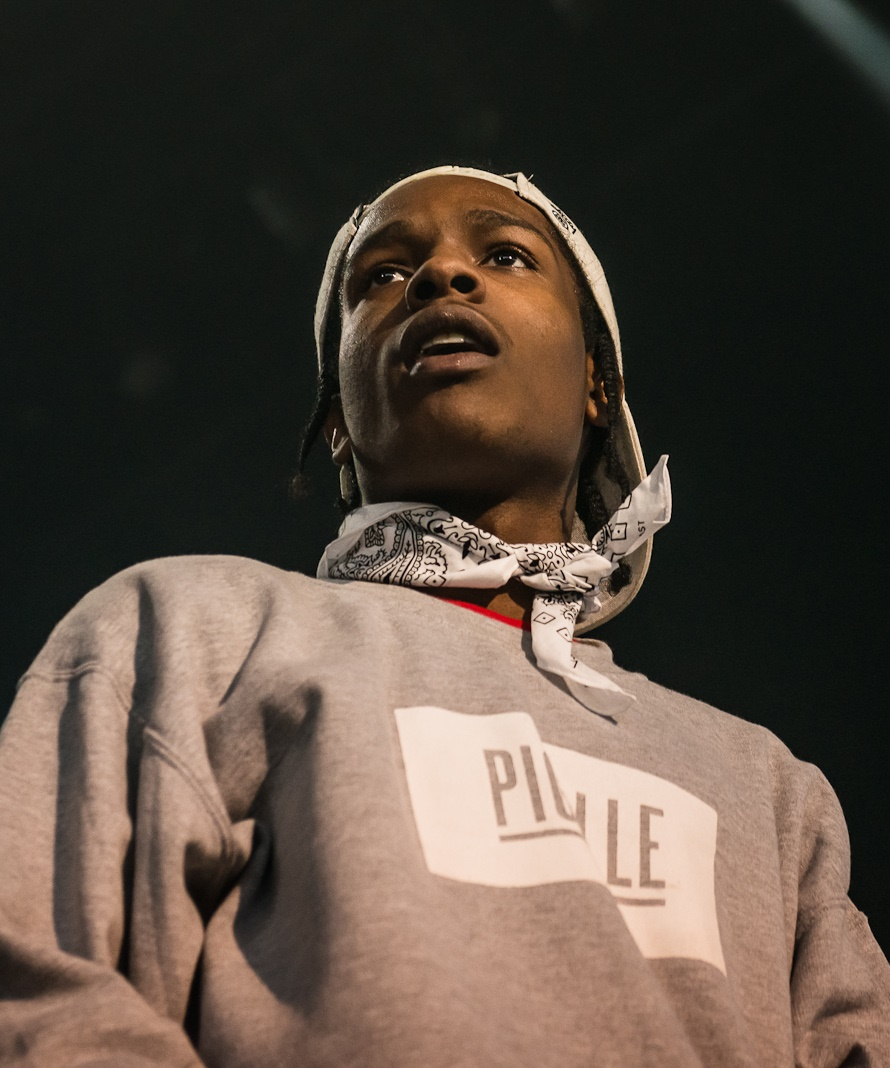
ASAP Ferg, (left) and ASAP Rocky (right) are two of the rappers who make a cameo appearance in the video.

On December 17, 2015, Brown uploaded the music video for "Picture Me Rollin'" on his YouTube and Vevo account. The video was directed by Chris Brown, and is part of the Royalty music videos storyline. Scott Disick, French Montana, Kid Red, ASAP Ferg, and ASAP Rocky make cameo appearances in the video.

=== Synopsis ===
The video follows the conclusion of Brown's "Anyway" music video. After breaking up with his girlfriend in his car, Brown gets a call from Scott Disick inviting him to a house party. In the party, shot in Brown's Los Angeles mansion, the singer is seen dancing, smoking and celebrating with his friends. He takes a break from partying to hang with a few girls in a bouncy castle, but things get heated when a goon cuts off the party's music to threaten Brown. The music video ends with the singer's friends supposedly hurting the goon.

== Charts ==
Chart performance for "Picture Me Rollin'"
Chart (2016)	Peak position
UK Hip Hop/R&B (Official Charts)	25
US Hot R&B/Hip-Hop Songs (Billboard)	50

== Certifications ==
Certifications for "Picture Me Rollin'"
Region	Certification	Certified units/sales
New Zealand (RMNZ)	Gold	15,000^{‡}
^{‡} Sales+streaming figures based on certification alone.
