= Tone Stith =

American singer (born 1995)

- Born: Antonio Stith; July 26, 1995 (age 30); Marlton, New Jersey, U.S.
- Genres: R&B; hip-hop
- Occupations: Singer; songwriter; record producer
- Years active: 2015–present
- Labels: RCA; MNRK
- Website: tonestithmusic.com

Antonio "Tone" Stith (born July 26, 1995) is an American R&B singer and songwriter signed to MNRK Records.

== Early life ==
Stith was born and raised in New Jersey and raised in a musical family. He began playing the drums at three years old and also learned the piano and guitar. His family encouraged his musical abilities, with his mother helping him learn to sing after overhearing him singing along to a song on a DVD of a Tyler Perry play. Stith learned how to utilize production software and started pursuing a musical career when he was a teenager. He formed the group SJ3 in high school, which attracted the interest of music executive Jas Prince, the driving force behind Drake's early career, when he was in his teens. With Prince's support, Stith began a solo career.

== Career ==
Stith is known for co-writing Chris Brown's 2015 platinum single "Liquor" and the track "Make Love" from the Royalty album. On July 11, 2017, he released his debut album Can We Talk while he was co-signed by Drake.

In 2021, Stith performed at the BET Awards 2021 and Victoria Monét's The Jaguar Tour as a supporting act in 2023. He was nominated for the Best New Artist at the 2021 Soul Train Music Awards. In 2022, he performed on stage at SXSW, Rolling Stone and Meta Creator House.

On September 8, 2023, Stith released an extended play titled P.O.V under RCA Records.

Stith has worked with notable acts including 2 Chainz, Ty Dolla Sign, H.E.R., Quavo, Swae Lee, Bryson Tiller and more. His single "Girls Like You" peaked at number 6 on Billboard's R&B charts.

== Discography ==
=== Mixtapes ===
- Can We Talk (2017)

=== EPs ===
- Good Company (2018)
- FWM (2021)
- Still FWM (2021)
- P.O.V (2023)

=== Singles ===
- "Light Flex" (2018)
- "Devotion" (2020)
- "FWM" (2021)
- "Like the First Time" (2021)
- "Something in the Water" (2021)
- "I Don't Wanna" (2021)
- "B.E.D" (2022)
- "Girls Like You" (2023)
- "I Need You" (2023)
- “SHUT UP” (2025)
- ”FLY” (2025)

=== Albums ===
- The Edge (2026)

== Awards and nominations ==
Year	Award	Categories	Result	Ref.
2021	Soul Train Music Awards	Best New Artist	Nominated	
