= Liquor (song) =

Single by Chris Brown

from the album Royalty
- Released: June 26, 2015
- Recorded: 2015
- Studio: Record Plant (Los Angeles, California)
- Genre: Alternative R&B
- Length: 3:47
- Label: RCA
- Songwriters: Chris Brown; Antonio Stith; Jordan Evans; Matthew Samuels; Omega Shelton
- Producers: Tone Stith; The Aquarius

Chris Brown singles chronology
"All Eyes on You" (2015)	"Liquor" (2015)	"Body on Me" (2015)

Music video
- "Liquor" on YouTube

"Liquor" is a song by American singer Chris Brown, from his seventh studio album Royalty. It was released as the album's lead single on June 26, 2015, by RCA Records.

The song was written by Chris Brown along with Tone Stith, Jordan Evan, Matthew Samuels and Omega Shelton, while its production was handled by Stith and The Aquarius. "Liquor" is an alternative R&B slow jam, with lyrics about Brown being secretly drugged by a woman, with the effects of the drug increasing his sexual desires towards her. The single was certified Platinum by the Recording Industry Association of America (RIAA).

Its music video was released on September 22, 2015, and is the first part of the Royalty music videos storyline, being connected in a two part music video with the following single from the album, "Zero". The videoclip follows the lyrical content of the song, with Brown being sneakily drugged by a woman, and later taken to her house. The video garnered positive reception from critics, for its psychedelic and cinematic visuals. Brown performed "Liquor" at the 2015 BET Awards, 2016 iHeartRadio Music Awards, and included it on all the setlists of his tours following its release.

== Background and composition ==
On June 25, 2015, Billboard revealed that Brown's seventh studio album would be released in the fall of that year. In the same interview with Billboard, Brown stated that "Liquor" would be included in the album's track list. The song was premiered on June 25, and was released for digital download the next day.

The song was written by Chris Brown, Tone Stith, Jordan Evans, Matthew Samuels and Omega Shelton, and was produced by Tone Stith and The Aquarius. "Liquor" is an alternative R&B slow jam, containing elements of psychedelic and soul music. PopCrush described it as a "synthy organ-driven track". In the song's lyrics, Brown starts to feel very intoxicated, noticing that a girl has secretly drugged his drink, with the effects of the drug increasing his sexual desires towards her, as he sings: “There's something in this liquor / The air is getting thicker / All I want is you”.

== Live performances ==
"Liquor" was performed live by Chris Brown at the BET Awards 2015. The performance started with the singer sitting at a piano, singing "Liquor" as a woman dressed in all-white danced behind him. Brown also performed the song at the 2016 iHeartRadio Music Awards. The song was included on all the setlists of Brown's tours following its release.

== Music video ==
=== Background ===
The official music video, was filmed on August 5, 2015. On August 7, 2015, a few images from "Liquor"’s music video shoot were released online. According to Hollywood Life, the video "was shot over two days in Los Angeles". On August 27, 2015, Brown uploaded a teaser for "Liquor" on his Instagram account. The music video premiered on September 22, 2015, and combines "Liquor" and the following single "Zero" into a single music video, having a total run-time of 9 minutes and 29 seconds.

The music video for "Liquor/Zero" was directed by Chris Brown.

=== Synopsis ===
The “Liquor” part of the video begins with Brown, alone at a dive bar named "Golden Gopher", drinking to get away from his sorrows. He's then offered a drink from a lady in a black dress, that he accepts, not knowing that she had sneakily put a drug in the glass. Brown drinks the drugged liquor, then he immediately feels dizzy and his vision gets hazy, as "Liquor" starts to play. The girl then takes a taxi with Brown that brings them to her house, and the singer, being under the influence of the drug, sees everything around him in a hallucinated way. The "Liquor" part of the video ends with Brown being dropped off by a taxi to another woman’s apartment.

=== Reception ===
According to HotNewHipHop, the "Liquor" video is "filled with dancing, drinking, psychedelia, and intrigue". The Irish Independent defined it as "psychedelic". HypeBeast praised it as "a vibrant, psychedelic and cinematic outing", noting that it "displays a Chris Brown we’re not too accustomed to seeing". Soul Bounce praised its visuals and Brown's "dynamic" and "discombobulated dance moves".

== Chart performance ==
"Liquor" peaked at number 60 on the US Billboard Hot 100, spending a total of 17 weeks on the chart. The song was certified Platinum by the Recording Industry Association of America (RIAA), denoting sales of 1,000,000 copies. In the United Kingdom, "Liquor" peaked at number 82 on the UK Singles Chart.

== Charts ==
Chart performance for "Liquor"
Chart (2015)	Peak position
UK Singles (Official Charts)	82
UK Hip Hop/R&B (Official Charts)	19
US Billboard Hot 100	60
US Hot R&B/Hip-Hop Songs (Billboard)	14
US R&B/Hip-Hop Airplay (Billboard)	3
US Rhythmic Airplay (Billboard)	22

== Certifications ==
Certifications for "Liquor"
Region	Certification	Certified units/sales
New Zealand (RMNZ)	Platinum	30,000^{‡}
United States (RIAA)	Platinum	1,000,000^{‡}
^{‡} Sales+streaming figures based on certification alone.
