= Raizhell =

Italian DJ and record producer

RAIZHELL

Background information
- Also known as: Razihel
- Born: Nicolò Arquilla; 23 April 1987 (age 39); Rome, Italy
- Genres: Drumstep; Dubstep; Electro; Electro house; Glitch hop; Melbourne bounce; Moombahcore; Drift phonk; Trap
- Years active: 2012–present
- Labels: Dim Mak; Monstercat; NoCopyrightSounds; Rottun; Warner Music Italy
- Member of: Streex
- Formerly of: Hopes Die Last
- Website: raizhell.com

Nicolò Arquilla (born 23 April 1987), better known as Raizhell (pronounced "Raise Hell") and formerly known as Razihel, is an Italian electronic music producer known for his releases on the Canadian-based record label Monstercat. Prior to his solo music career, Arquilla was the lead vocalist for the Italian post-hardcore band Hopes Die Last. Arquilla is also a member of the pop-punk duo Streex.

== Early life ==
Raizhell was born Nicolò Arquilla.

== Career ==
=== As Razihel ===
In 2012, Razihel self-released a song called "Fireflies (God Knows)". The song was negatively remarked for its song structure having similarities to Skrillex's "Scary Monsters and Nice Sprites" despite the sounds, per se, being his.

In February 2013, Razihel collaborated with Norwegian electronic music producer Savant to produce "Light Years", which was regarded for its "crisp vocals and beautiful intricate melodies". Three months later, Razihel collaborated with Varien to release "Toothless Hawkins (And His Robot Jazz Band)" on Monstercat. This glitch hop track combined electronic music with "an ample dose of swing" from "old school jazz". Five days later, Razihel released another dubstep track called "Homesick" on NoCopyrightSounds. The intro was "heavily influenced by nostalgic videogame tones", which was then followed by a drop that was regarded as explosive and spiraling.

In August 2014, Razihel released "Skybreaker", which included a "melodic rhythm... with some random vocal samples" in the introduction and a drop that included "chopped up bass samples".

In February 2015, Razihel released "Children Of The Night", a "dark and twisted" track which featured an "electrifying guitar" in the intro and a drop with a "Melbourne Bounce bass line". In June 2015, Razihel collaborated with Aero Chord to release "Titans". Additionally, in the same year, Razihel collaborated with The Bloody Beetroots on two songs: "Wrong", which was described as having "a seesawing pitched bass progression and bubbling breakdown arpeggios", and "Pizza House Party", which was described as having "upbeat, bass heavy, bouncing across melodies".

== Discography ==
=== Singles ===
==== As Razihel ====
Year	Title	Label
2012	Fireflies (God Knows)	Self-released
2013	Castlevania (with We Are Presidents & Alvino)	Self-released
2013	Light Years (with Savant)	Section Z Records
2013	Toothless Hawkins (And His Robot Jazz Band) (with Varien)	Monstercat
2013	Homesick (feat. Dave Revan)	NoCopyrightSounds
2013	One For All, All For One (with Virtual Riot)	Monstercat
2014	Spooky Jack (And His Living Dead Symphony) (with Varien)	Rottun Recordings
2014	Skybreaker	Monstercat
2015	Children Of The Night	Monstercat
2015	Wrong (with The Bloody Beetroots)	Dim Mak Records
2015	Titans (with Aero Chord)	Monstercat
2015	Pizza House Party (with The Bloody Beetroots)	Dim Mak Records

==== As Raizhell ====
- Rosalía (with Fedez & Taxi B) – 2024

=== Remixes ===
Date	Original Artist	Title	Label
2013	Benny Benassi & Pink Is Punk	"Perfect Storm"	Ultra Records
2013	Daft Punk (feat. Pharrell Williams & Nile Rodgers)	"Get Lucky"	Columbia Records
2013	Ellie Goulding	"Burn"	Polydor Records
2013	DJ Muggs	"Safe" (ft. Belle Humble)	Ultra Records
2013	DJ Jazzy Jeff & the Fresh Prince	"The Fresh Prince of Bel-Air"	Zomba Recording

=== Production credits ===
- Chris Brown – Body Shots (2014)
- Chris Brown – Little More (Royalty) (2015)
