= Casino Life 2 =

Mixtape by French Montana
- Released: May 8, 2015
- Genre: Hip hop
- Length: 53:03
- Label: Coke Boys; MMG
- Producer: Ayo; Carlos "Spiff TV" Suarez (exec.); Cool & Dre; Danny Boy Styles; Detail; DJ Spinz; Dolla; K-Major; Kyle Massey; Moon.1981; MP808; Reese; Southside; Swizz Beatz; TM88; Trakformaz; Young Chop

French Montana chronology
Mac & Cheese: The Appetizer (2014)	Casino Life 2 (2015)	Coke Zoo (2015)

Casino Life 2: Brown Bag Legend is the nineteenth mixtape by American recording artist French Montana. It was released on May 8, 2015. The mixtape features guest appearances from Lil Wayne, Chris Brown, Lil Durk, Curren$y, will.i.am, Migos, and others. Production was handled by Detail, Young Chop, Southside, DJ Spinz, TM88, Swizz Beats and others. It is the sequel to, Mister 16: Casino Life mixtape released in 2011. On May 3, Montana announced that the song, "I Ain't Gonna Lie", which featured Lil Wayne was going to be released on the mixtape.

== Track listing ==
No.	Title	Producer(s)	Length
1.	"Hold On (The Intro)"	Moon.1981	4:47
2.	"Off the Rip" (featuring Chinx and N.O.R.E.)	Trakformaz	3:57
3.	"Moses" (featuring Chris Brown and Migos)	Southside; TM88; DJ Spinz; K-Major	5:00
4.	"I Ain't Gonna Lie" (featuring Lil Wayne)	Swizz Beatz	3:53
5.	"Yay Yay"	Detail	3:10
6.	"AintNuttin" (featuring Rick Ross)	Ayo	3:33
7.	"5 Mo" (featuring Travi$ Scott and Lil Durk)	TM88; MP808	3:16
8.	"Gangsta"	Young Chop	3:09
9.	"Hard Work" (featuring Lil Durk)	Reese; Kyle Massey	2:45
10.	"Coke Boy Money" (featuring Chinx and Zack)	Dolla	3:12
11.	"Body Numb Full of Drugs"	Young Chop	4:49
12.	"All Hustle No Luck" (featuring will.i.am and Lil Durk)	Southside; TM88	6:01
13.	"In the Sun" (featuring Curren$y)	Cool & Dre	3:32
14.	"To Each His Own (The Outro)"	Danny Boy Styles	4:39
Total length:			53:03
