= Fine by Me (Chris Brown song) =

2015 song by Chris Brown

Single by Chris Brown

from the album Royalty
- Released: November 27, 2015
- Recorded: 2015
- Genre: Nu-disco
- Length: 3:27
- Label: RCA
- Songwriters: Chris Brown; Sean Douglas; Talay Riley; Ian Kirkpatrick; Jordan Johnson; Stefan Johnson; Alexander "Xplicit" Izquierdo
- Producers: The Monsters and the Strangerz; Ian Kirkpatrick

Chris Brown singles chronology
"Back to Sleep" (2015)	"Fine by Me" (2015)	"Something New" (2016)

Music video
- "Fine by Me" on YouTube

"Fine by Me" is a song by American singer Chris Brown from his seventh studio album Royalty. It was released as a single on November 27, 2015, by RCA Records.

== Background ==
On October 7, 2015, he posted on his Instagram account a video where he was lip-synching a snippet of "Fine by Me". The song was released, along with the pre-order on iTunes on November 26, 2015. On the following day, it was officially released as the album's fourth single.

== Music video ==
On November 27, 2015, Brown uploaded the music video for "Fine by Me" on his YouTube and Vevo account.

=== Synopsis ===
The video begins at the end of his video "Zero", and starts with Brown stumbling out of a convenience store before a girl lures him into a mysterious warehouse. He is told to change clothes and is greeted by a man on the screen who is out for blood. The madman unleashes his henchmen, who fight Brown on the dance floor doing an orchestrated fight-dance scene, but at the end he's able to defeat them all with his fighting moves.

== Charts ==
Chart performance for "Fine by Me"
Chart (2015–16)	Peak position
Belgium Dance (Ultratop Wallonia)	46
Belgium (Ultratop 50 Wallonia)	53
Netherlands (Single Top 100)	97
UK Singles (Official Charts)	76
US Bubbling Under Hot 100 Singles (Billboard)	13
US Bubbling Under R&B/Hip-Hop Singles (Billboard)	7
