= Back to Sleep (song) =

Single by Chris Brown

from the album Royalty
- Released: November 5, 2015
- Recorded: 2015
- Studio: The Record Plant (Los Angeles, California)
- Genre: R&B
- Length: 3:21
- Label: RCA
- Songwriters: Chris Brown; August Rigo
- Producers: Vinylz; Boi-1da; Ritter

Chris Brown singles chronology
"Gold Slugs" (2015)	"Back to Sleep" (2015)	"Fine by Me" (2015)

Music video
- "Back to Sleep" on YouTube

"Back to Sleep", also known by its censored title "Sex You Back to Sleep", is a song by American singer Chris Brown from his seventh studio album Royalty. The song was released as the album's third single and its first urban single on November 5, 2015. Three official remixes of the song were released in early 2016: The first featuring Usher and Zayn, the second featuring Miguel, August Alsina, and Trey Songz, and the final featuring Tank, R. Kelly and Anthony Hamilton.

The song received universal acclaim from contemporary music critics, noting it as one of the album's highlights, celebrating its production and Brown's vocal performance. Some critics called it the best R&B song of its decade. The song received comparisons to Brown's previous singles "Take You Down" (2008) and "No Bullshit" (2011), and also to Marvin Gaye's 1982 song "Sexual Healing", due to its similar musical direction. The song became the most successful one from the Royalty album, peaking at number 20 on the US Billboard Hot 100 and number 5 on the US Hot R&B/Hip-Hop Songs chart.

Its music video was released on December 14, 2015, and is part of Royalty music videos storyline, following the conclusion of Brown's "Fine by Me" music video. The videoclip depicts a sexually intimate scene between Brown and his love interest.

== Background ==
The song was written by Chris Brown and August Rigo, and was produced by Vinylz and Boi-1da. The song was recorded in 2015 at Record Plant in Los Angeles, California. "Back to Sleep" was premiered via SoundCloud on November 5, 2015, and was sent to radio four days later as the album's third single, also receiving its commercial release for digital download on November 9, 2015.

== Composition ==
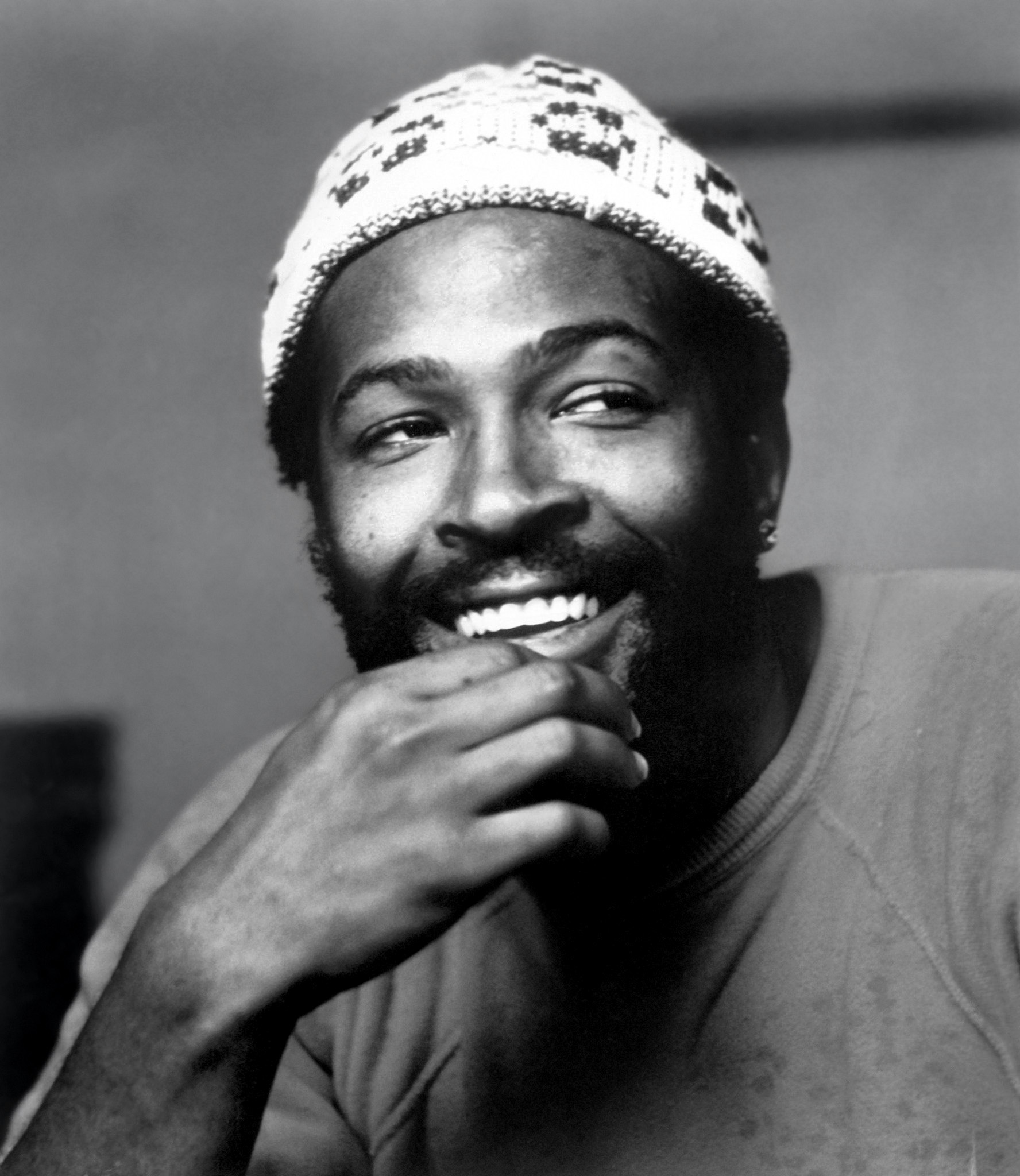
Brown said that "Back to Sleep" was inspired by Marvin Gaye's 1982 song "Sexual Healing".

"Back to Sleep" is a mid-tempo R&B slow jam, about late night sex, that features minor influences of funk, and roland TR-808 beats reminiscent of Marvin Gaye's 1982 song "Sexual Healing". Vibe stated that the song infuses elements of "new school R&B" with "a light dusting of 1980s pop". According to Billboard, the lyrical content of "Back to Sleep" features "Brown fresh off a late night flight into town", detailing how he plans to go to his girlfriend's house, wake her up at 3:30 a.m. to have sex with her, then tuck her in for actual sleep.

== Music video ==
=== Background ===
The music video for "Back to Sleep" was directed by Brown, and released on December 14, 2015, on his YouTube and Vevo account.

=== Synopsis ===
The video follows the conclusion of Brown's "Fine by Me" music video, and starts with the singer making a phone call to his girlfriend, asking her if he could "come over" to her house even though it's late at night, because of "weird" things happening to him throughout the night. As soon as Brown arrives to her house, they get intimate, with scenes showing them kissing and touching in the shower and bedroom, intercut with scenes of Brown performing the song in a club, with a female band.

== Live performances ==
Brown promoted the song with live performances on televised shows and festivals, including Jimmy Kimmel Live!, Taraji & Terrence's White Hot Holidays, the "Lil' Weezyana Fest 2016", and the 3rd iHeartRadio Music Awards. The song was included in the setlists of all Brown's tours following its release.

== Remixes ==
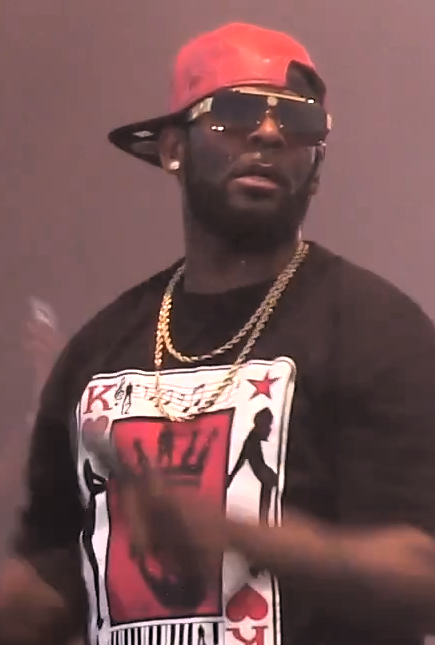
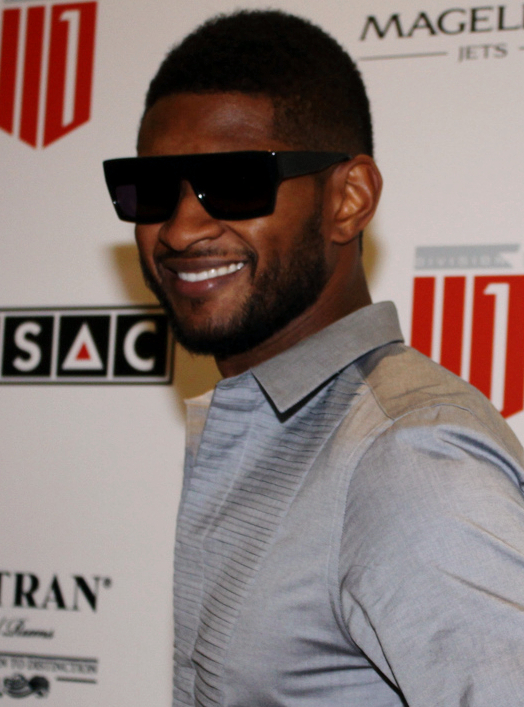
R. Kelly (left) and Usher (right) are two of the many artists that appeared on remixes of the track.

Chris Brown has released three remixes to the song. Part 1 features Usher and Zayn, and was released as "Back to Sleep (Remix)" on February 26, 2016; in addition to verses from Usher and Zayn Malik, the remix also features a new verse from Brown where he mentions his ex-girlfriend Karrueche Tran and cancels out the rest of the song except the chorus and bridge. Part 2 features Miguel, August Alsina, and Trey Songz, and was released as "Back to Sleep (Remix)" on April 8, while Part 3 was released on April 10 as "Back To Sleep (Legends Remix)", and features Tank, R. Kelly and Anthony Hamilton. On August 29, 2016, R&B singer Brandy shared a version of the song with Brown. On July 15, 2016, another remix version was released, dubbed as the "Secret Garden Remix". The song featured previously released verses from R. Kelly, Usher, Tank, and an additional verse from R&B singer and actor Tyrese Gibson.

== Critical reception ==
"Back to Sleep" received widespread acclaim from music critics. In 2018, the co-host of The Breakfast Club, Charlamagne tha God, defined the song as "the best R&B record in the past 15 years" along with "Adorn" by Miguel. AllMusic's editor Andy Kellman stated that the track is the best one on the Royalty album. Brad Wete of Billboard said that it "excels as a quality addition to his catalog’s stellar collection of panty-dropping and baby-making songs", comparing the song to Brown's previous singles "Take You Down" (2008) and "No Bullshit" (2011), and also to Marvin Gaye's 1982 song "Sexual Healing".

Mikael Wood of The Courier-Journal praised Brown's "great vocal performance" on the track, describing it as "a smooth depiction of genuine sexuality". Soul Bounce called it "The highlight of Royalty" and "a polished, well-produced song that [spotlights] Brown's talent". Renowned for Sound complimented the song's "impressive vocals" and its production, saying that "the synth R&B arrangement is as smooth as ever", stating that the chorus has a "risqué" sex appeal. Vibe said that "Back to Sleep" is "a super sexy song", finding shock value in its sexually explicit lyrics.

== Chart performance ==
On the Billboard Hot 100, the song debuted at number 64 on the week ending January 2, 2016, and reached number 48 on the week ending February 13, 2016. On the week ending March 12, 2016, it reached number 36 on the Hot 100, and number 2 on the Mainstream R&B/Hip-Hop chart. On the week ending March 19, 2016, it reached number 20 on the Hot 100 and became the top Digital Gainer of the week, debuting at number 13 on the Digital Songs chart, having sold 42,000 downloads that week, 32% of which stemmed from the Part 1 remix. The same week, it reached number 5 on the Hot R&B/Hip-Hop Songs chart, number 2 on the R&B Digital Songs chart, and number 3 on the Hot R&B Songs chart. By April 2, 2016, the single had sold 300,620 copies in the US.

== Track listing ==
- Digital download
1. "Back to Sleep" (Explicit) – 3:21
- Digital download (Remix)
1. "Back to Sleep" (Remix) (featuring Usher and Zayn) – 4:27
- Digital download (Legends Remix)
1. "Back to Sleep" (Legends Remix) (featuring Tank, R. Kelly and Anthony Hamilton) – 3:43

== Charts ==
=== Weekly charts ===
Weekly chart performance for "Back to Sleep"
Chart (2015–16)	Peak position
Australia (ARIA)	74
Belgium Urban (Ultratop Flanders)	31
Canada Hot 100 (Billboard)	95
France (SNEP)	138
Netherlands (Single Tip)	8
New Zealand (Recorded Music NZ)	38
South Africa Airplay (EMA)	4
UK Singles (Official Charts)	100
UK Hip Hop/R&B (Official Charts)	18
US Billboard Hot 100	20
US Adult R&B Songs (Billboard)	24
US Hot R&B/Hip-Hop Songs (Billboard)	7
US R&B/Hip-Hop Airplay (Billboard)	3
US Rhythmic Airplay (Billboard)	5

=== Year-end charts ===
2016 year-end chart performance for "Back to Sleep"
Chart (2016)	Position
US Billboard Hot 100	89
US Hot R&B/Hip-Hop Songs (Billboard)	33
US R&B/Hip-Hop Airplay (Billboard)	11
US Rhythmic (Billboard)	32

== Certifications ==
Certifications for "Back to Sleep"
Region	Certification	Certified units/sales
Australia (ARIA)	Platinum	70,000^{‡}
Denmark (IFPI Danmark)	Gold	45,000^{‡}
New Zealand (RMNZ)	3× Platinum	90,000^{‡}
United Kingdom (BPI)	Gold	400,000^{‡}
United States (RIAA)	4× Platinum	4,000,000^{‡}
^{‡} Sales+streaming figures based on certification alone.
