= Zero (Chris Brown song) =

Single by Chris Brown

from the album Royalty
- Released: September 18, 2015
- Recorded: 2014
- Genre: Disco; funk
- Length: 3:33
- Label: RCA
- Songwriters: Chris Brown; Sean Douglas; Talay Riley; Matthew Burnett; Tushar Apte
- Producers: Matthew Burnett; Tushar Apte; Riley Bell

Chris Brown singles chronology
"Moses" (2015)	"Zero" (2015)	"Play No Games" (2015)

Music video
- "Zero" on YouTube

"Zero" is a song by American singer Chris Brown from his seventh studio album Royalty. It was released as a single on September 18, 2015, by RCA Records.

The song received positive reviews from music critics, who noted it as one of the album's highlights and celebrated its production, praising his 1980s-inspired sound, including the use of talk box. The song peaked at number 80 on the Billboard Hot 100.

== Composition and lyrics ==
"Zero" is a disco-funk song. Critics compared it to the work of American band Chic and French electronic music duo Daft Punk. Funk elements are evident in the bass line and the electric guitar rhythm in the chorus. The track also features a robotic vocodered voice reminiscent of Daft Punk. Lyrically, Brown sings about not caring over a breakup, stating, "Ask how many nights I've been thinking of you, zero". Some critics speculated that the lyrics were dedicated to Brown's ex-girlfriend Karrueche Tran.

== Cover artwork ==
The cover artwork is similar to artwork used in the 1985 manga City Hunter. The layout is practically identical with only minor variations such as skin tone. RCA does not give attribution for the song's artwork.

== Critical reception ==
"Zero" received positive reviews from music critics. AllMusic editor Andy Kellman called the song a "disco-funk throwback replete with talkbox", noting some irony in writing, recording, and releasing a song bragging about not thinking of an ex. Marcus Dowling of HipHopDX said that the song and "No Filter", another song from Royalty, "pack in all of the aforementioned Rodgers' chugging grooves from Chic's 'Good Times', David Bowie's 'Let's Dance', and Daft Punk's 'Get Lucky' into one production". Mike Pizzo of Las Vegas Weekly praised the sound but was less impressed with the lyrical content: "it's hard not to nod your head to the cheesy '80s grooves of 'Fine by Me' or 'Zero', even if the message is endlessly eye rolling." Jesse Cataldo of Slant Magazine praised the song saying that "'Zero' similarly has a pretty good neo-disco aesthetic, with warm synth washes and some genial Vocoder noodling", comparing the track's musicality to Daft Punk's Random Access Memories".

== Music video ==
On August 7, 2015 a few images from the music video shoot were released online. On August 27, 2015, Brown uploaded a teaser for "Liquor/Zero" on his Instagram. The music video premiered on September 22, 2015, along with "Liquor" as one video.

=== Synopsis ===
The music video for "Liquor/Zero" was directed by Brown. In the “Zero” part of the video, Brown returns home after a long night and finds a girl he’s been seeing throwing his clothes off a balcony because she did not know where he was. Rather than get into an argument, Brown decides to gather his boys and go out, and after he dance starting in an alley and moves his way into a laundromat with his crew before taking the stage at downtown theater. At the end of the video there is a cameo by Dan Bilzerian.

== Track listing ==
- Digital download
1. "Zero" (Explicit) — 3:33
- Digital download
1. "Zero" (Clean) — 3:30

== Charts ==
Chart performance for "Zero"
Chart (2015–16)	Peak position
Belgium (Ultratip Bubbling Under Flanders)	25
Belgium Urban (Ultratop Flanders)	30
Belgium (Ultratop 50 Wallonia)	33
France (SNEP)	181
Netherlands (Single Tip)	22
UK Singles (Official Charts)	68
US Billboard Hot 100	80
US Pop Airplay (Billboard)	33
US Bubbling Under R&B/Hip-Hop Singles (Billboard)	1
US Rhythmic Airplay (Billboard)	8

== Certifications ==
Certifications for "Zero"
Region	Certification	Certified units/sales
New Zealand (RMNZ)	Gold	15,000^{‡}
United States (RIAA)	Gold	500,000^{‡}
^{‡} Sales+streaming figures based on certification alone.
