= Counterfeit (novel) =

2022 book

- Author: Kirstin Chen
- Language: English
- Genre: Crime fiction, Thriller, Caper story
- Publisher: William Morrow and Company
- Publication date: 7 June 2022
- ISBN: 000848449X
- OCLC: 1261878899

Counterfeit is a novel written by Singaporean author Kirstin Chen. It follows Ava Wong, a Chinese-American lawyer who is embroiled in a scheme involving selling counterfeit luxury handbags when she reconnects with Winnie Fang, her roommate in college who left after a cheating scandal.

== Reception ==
Camille Perri of The New York Times Book Review called it an "entertaining, luxurious read" and a "shrewd deconstruction of the American dream and the myth of the model minority." Olivia Ho of The Straits Times gave the novel a 4 out of 5 rating and wrote it "knocks it out of the park." Kirkus Reviews called it "clever, sharp, and slyly funny" and a "delightfully different caper novel with a "Gone Girl"–style plot twist." Publishers Weekly stated: "The story is further deepened by the author’s sharp, convincing details of the fashion industry and its shadow market, which lends this tale of fakes the tang of authenticity." Laura Peacock of the Waterloo Region Record called it a "fun, frothy, entertaining read best paired with the most complicated coffee drink you can think of, so that you can feel just an indulgent as the read." Lacy Baugher Milas of Paste called it an "absolutely perfect beach or poolside escapist adventure, sly, funny, and whip-smart by turns." The magazine also included the novel on its list of "Must-Read New Thrillers for Summer 2022".
