= Little More (Royalty) =

205 song by Chris Brown

Song by Chris Brown

from the album Royalty
- Recorded: 2015
- Genre: Pop; R&B
- Length: 4:20
- Label: RCA
- Songwriters: Chris Brown; Jason Boyd; Dominic Jordan; Jimmy Giannos; Nicolò Arquilla; Daniele Autore
- Producers: The Audibles; Danusk; Poo Bear; Max Borghetti; Razihel

Music video
- "Little More (Royalty)" on YouTube

"Little More (Royalty)" is a song by American singer Chris Brown from his seventh studio album Royalty. It was produced by The Audibles and Poo Bear. The song peaking at number 91 on the US Billboard Hot 100, and number 32 on the US Hot R&B/Hip-Hop Songs chart.

== Music video ==
=== Background and synopsis ===
On December 18, 2015, Brown uploaded the music video for "Little More (Royalty)" on his YouTube and Vevo account. In the video, Brown wakes up after a night of partying to find a little girl looking around his bedroom. He winds up acting very confused, but that confusion turns to love. The video shows them playing together, eating, and doing all sorts of fun things.

=== Reception ===
Many critics have praised the video saying that Brown shows a more playful side in the video, playing with his little girl, feeding her breakfast, dancing, blowing bubbles and just generally goofing off together.

== Charts ==
Chart performance for "Little More (Royalty)"
Chart (2016)	Peak position
Canada Hot 100 (Billboard)	98
UK Hip Hop/R&B (OCC)	29
US Billboard Hot 100	91
US Hot R&B/Hip-Hop Songs (Billboard)	32

== Certifications ==
Certifications for "Little More (Royalty)"
Region	Certification	Certified units/sales
United States (RIAA)	Gold	500,000^{‡}
^{‡} Sales+streaming figures based on certification alone.
