= Moses (French Montana song) =

Single by French Montana featuring Chris Brown and Migos

from the album Casino Life 2
- Released: August 21, 2015
- Genre: Hip hop; trap
- Length: 4:27
- Label: Bad Boy; Interscope
- Songwriters: Karim Kharbouch; Christopher Brown; Quavious Marshall; Kiari Cephus; Kirsnick Ball; Joshua Luellen; Bryan Simmons; Gary Hill; Kendricke Brown
- Producers: Southside; TM88; DJ Spinz; K-Major

French Montana singles chronology
"I'm Up" (2015)	"Moses" (2015)	"All the Way Up" (2016)

Chris Brown singles chronology
"Body on Me" (2015)	"Moses" (2015)	"Zero" (2015)

Migos singles chronology
"One Time" (2015)	"Moses" (2015)	"No Days Off" (2015)

"Moses" is a song by American rapper French Montana. It was released on August 21, 2015, as the second single from his mixtape, Casino Life 2 (2015).The song features American singer and rapper Chris Brown and American hip hop trio Migos. The hip hop song was produced by Southside, TM88, DJ Spinz and K-Major. The intro begins with vocals from rapper Travis Scott.

== Track listing ==
- Download digital
1. Moses (featuring Chris Brown and Migos) — 5:00

== Music video ==
On November 12, 2015, Montana uploaded the music video for "Moses" on his YouTube and Vevo account.

== Critical reception ==
Colin Joyce from Spin called it "a lovely, druggy futurist and (Future-ish) single". Calling it a "high powered" song, C. Vernon Coleman II of XXL wrote that Brown "comes up with the catchy chorus".

== Charts ==
=== Weekly charts ===
Chart (2015–16)	Peak position
US Bubbling Under R&B/Hip-Hop Singles (Billboard)	1
US R&B/Hip-Hop Airplay (Billboard)	25
US Hot Rap Songs (Billboard)	23
