= BET Presents Chris Brown =

- The cover for BET Presents Chris Brown

Video album by Chris Brown
- Released: September 16, 2007
- Recorded: 2006–2007
- Genre: R&B; soul; pop; hip-hop
- Length: 60 minutes
- Language: English
- Label: Black Entertainment Television

BET Presents Chris Brown is a DVD released by the American R&B singer-songwriter Chris Brown. The DVD was originally packaged with Exclusive, exclusively at Wal-mart. The release features BET highlights, performance highlights, and music videos from throughout Brown's career. Brown gives a candid interview as he talks about the production of Exclusive.

== Release ==
In collaboration with Jive and Zomba Records, BET Official created BET Presents Chris Brown to help celebrate the release Brown's sophomore effort and gives his fans a chance to experience highlights from his career. The DVD was originally packaged with Brown's second album, Exclusive, exclusively at Walmart. However, it is now available for individual purchase at online shopping sites such as Amazon.com.

DVD features BET Highlights

- 2006 BET Hip Hop Awards Performances
- Interview with Chris Brown
- 106 and Park Performances & Interviews

Music videos

- "Run It!"
- "Say Goodbye"
- "Gimme That"
- "Yo (Excuse Me Miss)"
- "Wall to Wall"
- "Kiss Kiss" (Sneak Peek)
