= Body on Me (Rita Ora song) =

Single by Rita Ora featuring Chris Brown
- Released: 7 August 2015
- Studio: California (Record Plant, R8D, Larrabee Sound); New York (Sterling Sound)
- Genre: Pop; R&B
- Length: 3:45
- Label: Roc Nation; Columbia
- Songwriters: James Abrahart; Rosina Russell; Tinashe Sibanda; Marcus Lomax; Jordan Johnson; Stefan Johnson; Chris Brown; Balazs Harko; Robin Ellignsen
- Producers: T-Colla; The Monsters and the Strangerz; Faux Delorean

Rita Ora singles chronology
"Poison" (2015)	"Body on Me" (2015)	"Coming Home" (2015)

Chris Brown singles chronology
"Liquor" (2015)	"Body on Me" (2015)	"Moses" (2015)

Fetty Wap singles chronology
"Again" (2015)	"Body on Me" (2015)	"1Hunnid" (2015)

Music video
- "Body on Me" on YouTube

"Body on Me" is a song by British singer Rita Ora, featuring guest vocals by American singer Chris Brown. The song was released on 7 August 2015. A remix featuring American rapper and singer Fetty Wap was released on 25 August 2015.

== Background and composition ==
Ora and Brown confirmed their collaboration on 24 July 2015 by posting a still from the song's accompanying music video to their respective Instagram accounts. The song's audio and accompanying artwork were revealed on 6 August, ahead of its release on 7 August 2015. "Body on Me" is a pop and R&B song with a tempo of 89 beats per minute.

== Music video ==
A music video to accompany the release of the song was first released on Vevo on 18 August 2015 at a total length of four minutes and thirty-eight seconds. The music video was directed by Colin Tilley.

== Live performances ==
Ora and Brown performed the song for the first time together during an episode of Jimmy Kimmel Live on 8 September 2015. Ora later performed a solo rendition of the song on Good Morning America on 16 September and in an episode of The Ellen DeGeneres Show which aired on 5 October. Ora included the song as part of a medley with "Poison" and "Trapping Ain't Dead" at the 2015 MOBO Awards, where she was joined onstage by Section Boyz. On 12 November 2015, Ora performed the song as part of medley with "I Will Never Let You Down" at the Bambi Awards 2015.

== Track listing ==
- Digital download
1. "Body on Me" (featuring Chris Brown) – 3:45
- Digital download – Fetty Wap Remix
1. "Body on Me" (Fetty Wap Remix) (featuring Chris Brown and Fetty Wap) – 3:49
- Digital download – The Remixes
1. "Body on Me" (Zac Samuel Remix Edit)– 3:18
2. "Body on Me" (Dave Audé Tropical Remix) – 4:47
3. "Body on Me" (Fwdslxsh Remix – 2:42
- CD single
1. "Body on Me" (featuring Chris Brown) – 3:47
2. "Body on Me" (Fetty Way Remix) (featuring Chris Brown and Fetty Wap) – 3:50

== Charts ==
=== Weekly charts ===
Chart (2015)	Peak position
Australia (ARIA)	66
Belgium (Ultratip Bubbling Under Flanders)	55
Canada Hot 100 (Billboard)	91
Czech Republic Singles Digital (ČNS IFPI)	65
France (SNEP)	118
Ireland (IRMA)	54
Netherlands (Single Tip)	13
New Zealand Heatseekers (RMNZ)	6
Scottish Singles Sales (Official Charts)	14
Slovakia Singles Digital (ČNS IFPI)	55
Sweden Heatseeker (Sverigetopplistan)	13
South Africa (EMA)	66
UK Singles (Official Charts)	22
US Bubbling Under Hot 100 (Billboard)	2
US Rhythmic Airplay (Billboard)	16

=== Year-end charts ===
Chart (2015)	Position
UK Singles (OCC)	60

== Certifications ==
Region	Certification	Certified units/sales
New Zealand (RMNZ)	2× Platinum	60,000^{‡}
United Kingdom (BPI)	Gold	400,000^{‡}
^{‡} Sales+streaming figures based on certification alone.

== Release history ==
Country	Date	Format	Label	Ref.
Various	August 7, 2015	Digital download	Roc Nation; Columbia	
United States	August 11, 2015	Rhythmic contemporary	Roc Nation; Columbia	
Various	August 28, 2015	Digital download (remixes)	Roc Nation; Columbia	
Italy	September 18, 2015	Contemporary hit radio	Roc Nation; Columbia	
