= Before the Party =

Mixtape by Chris Brown
- Released: November 27, 2015
- Recorded: 2012–15
- Genres: R&B; hip hop; pop
- Length: 120:25
- Label: CBE
- Producers: Nard & B; Soundz; Issac Flame; Wheezy; Danja; Drumma Boy; Tone Stith; Will A Fool; The Mekanics; Swiff D; Krysshun; J.U.S.T.I.C.E. League; DJ Khaled; The Inkwell; David D.A. Doman; David Banner; DJ Chose; Kuk Harrell

Chris Brown chronology
Fan of a Fan: The Album (2015)	Before the Party (2015)	Royalty (2015)

Before the Party is the sixth mixtape by American recording artist Chris Brown. It was released on November 27, 2015, by Chris Brown Entertainment on DatPiff for free. The mixtape contains appearances from French Montana, Wiz Khalifa, Rihanna, Wale, Fetty Wap, Tyga, and more. It also includes production from Kuk Harrell, Danja, David Banner, Drumma Boy, among others. Before the Party was released as a prelude to his seventh studio album, Royalty.

Before the Party received positive reviews from music critics, that praised its sound, the performances and its songwriting. The mixtape became one of the biggest releases on DatPiff, reaching more than 500,000 downloads.

== Release ==
On October 13, 2015, Brown announced that his upcoming album Royalty would've been released on November 27, 2015. After it was revealed that the album has been pushed back to December 18, 2015, in exchange on November 27, 2015, he released a free 34-track mixtape on DatPiff, called Before the Party, as a prelude to Royalty. The mixtape is composed by previously unreleased tracks that Brown recorded in different studio sessions between 2012 and 2015. The cover art was created by visual artist McFlyy, and features an anime depiction of Brown, posing stoically in a Bape coat, floating in the universe with a woman with bountiful cleavage and a Gundam head. The mixtape was later released on various streaming platforms on August 15, 2017, in its entirety.

== Reception ==
=== Critical reception ===
Professional ratings
Review scores
Source	Rating
HotNewHipHop	4.5/5 stars

Before the Party received positive reviews from music critics. HotNewHipHop's Nicholas DG responded positively to the mixtape, calling it "an impressive massive mixtape". He praised "Holy Angel" as one of Brown's best songs, writing that the track "is bent on collecting the hardships and sins he has faced throughout his lifetime". The critic also praised "Play Me" for its "slowly crescendoing orchestral sound and a hypnotic drum beat", described "Desperado" as a "perfect musical embodiment" of betrayal, called "Gotta Get Up" a Michael Jackson-inspired track, and highlighted "FAN (Freak at Night)" for its blend of rock, hip-hop, and electro influences. Craig Jenkins of Vice described it as an "album-before-the-album", and commented that its songs "aren’t leftovers or scraps exactly, either. They’re really accomplished. Song after state-of-the-art song, Before the Party makes you wonder what did make [Royalty], if this is all the stuff that didn’t". Digital Spy's Ian Sandwell argued that Before the Party was a stronger project than the album Royalty, which the mixtape was intended to serve as a prelude to. He also described parts of the mixtape as experimental and praised its "atmospheric downtempo R&B cuts" as its standout tracks.

=== Commercial performance ===
It received a great success being one of the most listened and downloaded free mixtapes on DatPiff, being certified double platinum by the site's standards, reaching over 500,000 downloads and over 3,000,000 full listens.

== Track listing ==
No.	Title	Producer(s)	Length
1.	"Counterfeit" (featuring Rihanna, Wiz Khalifa and Kelly Rowland)	Danja; RoccStar	4:35
2.	"Go"	Kuk Harrell	3:45
3.	"Sex"	David D.A. Doman; RoccStar	4:36
4.	"Holy Angel" (featuring Pusha T)	DJ Chose	4:40
5.	"Pussy"	Krysshun	3:39
6.	"Play Me"		3:24
7.	"Gotta Get Up"		2:34
8.	"All I Need" (featuring Wale)	J.U.S.T.I.C.E. League; DJ Khaled	4:18
9.	"Text Message" (featuring Tyga)	Vidal Davis	3:49
10.	"Red Lights"	Soundz	4:26
11.	"Just So You Know"	XZ; Wheezy	3:46
12.	"Ghetto Tales"	Swiff D	2:57
13.	"Come Home Tonight"	DJ Chose	3:40
14.	"The Breakup"	Chizzy; Amadeus	4:12
15.	"Hell of a Night" (featuring French Montana and Fetty Wap)	The Mekanics	3:36
16.	"Freaky Shit"	Drumma Boy	2:50
17.	"Beat It Up"	Tone Stith	4:08
18.	"Won't Change"		3:18
19.	"Here We Go Again"	Glass John	4:01
20.	"FAN [Freak At Night]"		4:22
21.	"Swallow Me Down" (featuring French Montana)		5:04
22.	"Till the Morning"	The Featherstones	3:01
23.	"Right Now"	Don City; Derrick Beck	3:12
24.	"Seasons Change"	Amadeus	3:42
25.	"Roses Turn Blue"		4:06
26.	"Second Hand Love"	RoccStar	3:50
27.	"I Can't Win"	Amadeus	2:36
28.	"Matter"		3:06
29.	"Lipstick On the Glass"	Will A Fool	3:14
30.	"Scared To Love You"		2:15
31.	"Show Off"	David Banner	3:26
32.	"Desperado"		2:27
33.	"Trust Me"	J.U.S.T.I.C.E. League	2:47
34.	"4 Seconds"	JAYLIEN	3:54
Total length:			119:85

Before the Party — (bonus tracks)
No.	Title	Length
35.	"Start It Slow"	3:10

Notes

- "Beat It Up" features uncredited additional vocals by Tone Stith.
- "Here We Go Again" features uncredited additional vocals by Rihanna.
- "I Can't Win" features uncredited additional vocals by Sevyn Streeter.
- "4 Seconds" features uncredited additional vocals by Joelle James.

Sample credits

- "All I Need" contains elements of "Me and My Girlfriend" (1996) performed by Tupac Shakur. and "Miss You, Goodbye" by K. Michelle (2014).
- "Roses Turn Blue" contains elements of "Merry Christmas Mr. Lawrence" (1983) performed by Ryuichi Sakamoto.
- "Hell of a Night" contains elements of "Last Night a D.J. Saved My Life" (1983) performed by Indeep.
- ”Beat It Up” contains elements of "Escapade" (1990) performed by Janet Jackson.
- ”Till The Morning” contains elements of "You're Not My Kind of Girl" (1988) performed by New Edition.
