= Anyway (Chris Brown song) =

2015 song

Song by Chris Brown featuring Tayla Parx

from the album Royalty
- Released: December 11, 2015
- Genre: EDM; dance-pop
- Length: 3:31
- Label: RCA
- Songwriters: Brown; Darius Logan; Lisa Scinta; Tayla Parx; Dominique Logan
- Producer: BLAQTUXEDO

Music video
- "Anyway" on YouTube

"Anyway" is a song by American singer Chris Brown from his seventh studio album Royalty. It was released as an instant grat track on December 11, 2015. It was produced by BLAQTUXEDO and features a guest appearance by fellow American singer Tayla Parx. The song peaked at number 7 on the US Bubbling Under Hot 100 Singles.

== Music video ==
On December 16, 2015, Brown uploaded the music video for "Anyway" on his YouTube and Vevo account.

== Charts ==
Chart performance for "Anyway"
Chart (2016)	Peak position
Lebanon (Lebanese Top 20)	12
US Bubbling Under Hot 100 Singles (Billboard)	7
