= Jamie Foxx discography =

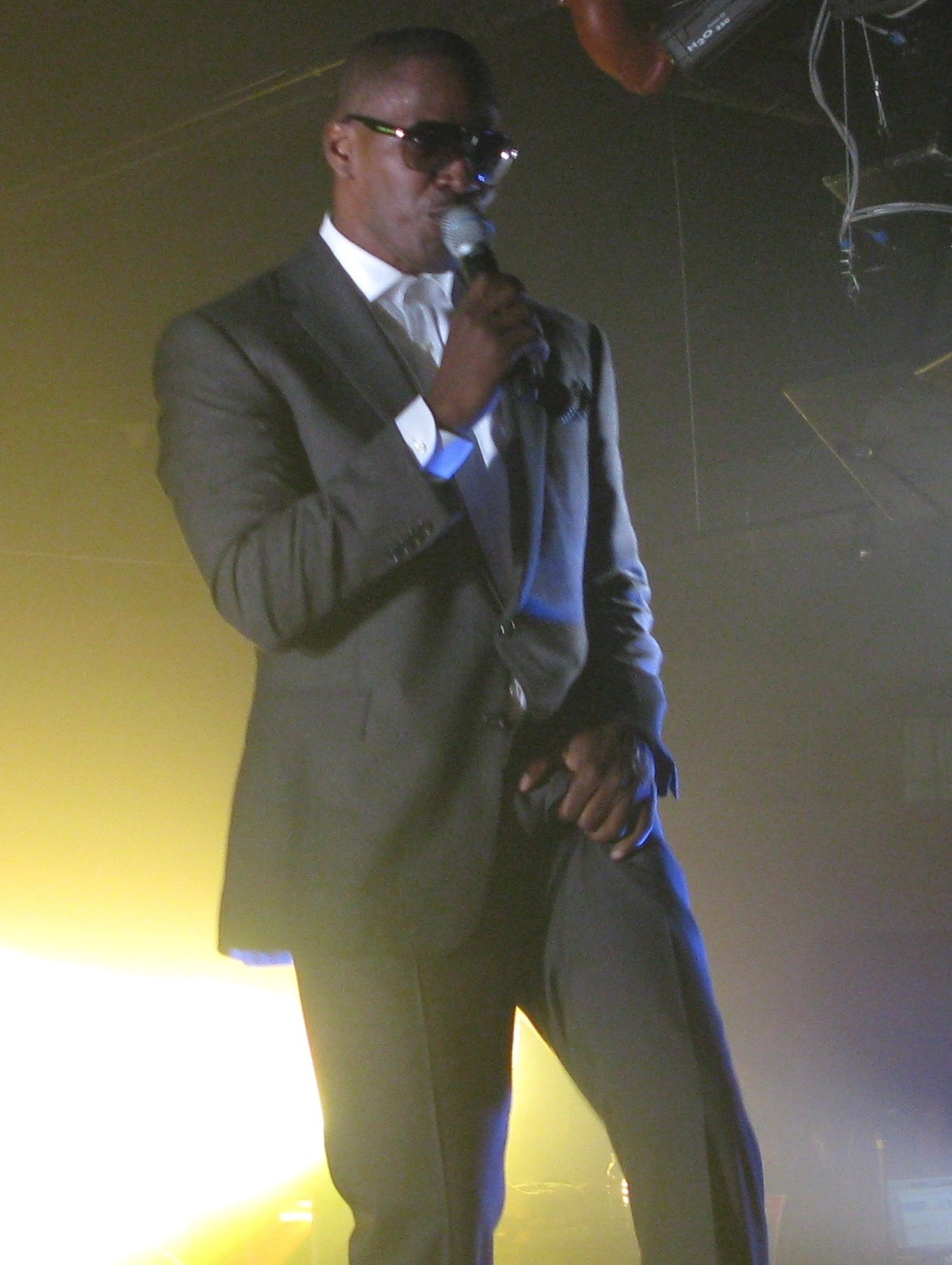
- Studio albums: 5
- Singles: 19
- Music videos: 12

This is a comprehensive listing of releases by Jamie Foxx, an American actor, singer, and comedian.

== Studio albums ==
List of albums, with selected chart positions
Title	Album details	Peaks								Sales	Certifications
Title	Album details	US	US R&B	AUS	NLD	GER	NZ	SWI	UK	Sales	Certifications
Peep This	Released: July 19, 1994; Label: Fox; Format: CD, cassette, digital download	78	12	—	—	—	—	—	—	US: 138,000	
Unpredictable	Released: December 20, 2005; Label: J; Format: CD, LP, digital download	1	1	39	47	43	13	66	9	US: 1,998,000	RIAA: 2× Platinum; BPI: Silver; MC: Gold
Intuition	Released: December 16, 2008; Label: J; Format: CD, digital download	3	1	—	—	—	—	—	—	US: 1,000,000	RIAA: Platinum
Best Night of My Life	Released: December 21, 2010; Label: J; Format: CD, digital download	6	2	—	—	—	—	—	—	US: 409,000	
Hollywood: A Story of a Dozen Roses	Released: May 18, 2015; Label: RCA; Format: CD, digital download	10	1	—	—	—	—	—	—		

== Singles ==
=== As lead artist ===
List of singles as lead artist, with selected chart positions and certifications, showing year released and album name
Title	Year	Peak chart positions						Certifications	Album
Title	Year	US	US R&B	AUS	CAN	NZ	UK	Certifications	Album
"Infatuation"	1994	92	36	—	—	—	—		Peep This
"Experiment"	1994	—	88	—	—	—	—		Peep This
"Extravaganza" (featuring Kanye West)	2005	—	52	22	—	13	43		Unpredictable
"Unpredictable" (featuring Ludacris)	2005	8	2	44	—	—	16	RIAA: Platinum; RMNZ: Gold	Unpredictable
"DJ Play a Love Song" (featuring Twista)	2006	45	5	—	—	—	—	RIAA: Gold	Unpredictable
"Can I Take U Home"	2006	—	48	—	—	—	—		Unpredictable
"Just Like Me" (featuring T.I.)	2008	49	8	91	—	12	—	RMNZ: Gold	Intuition
"She Got Her Own" (with Ne-Yo & Fabolous)	2008	54	2	—	—	—	—		Intuition
"Blame It" (featuring T-Pain)	2009	2	1	79	7	29	123	RIAA: Platinum; RMNZ: Platinum	Intuition
"Digital Girl" (Remix) (featuring Drake, Kanye West and The-Dream)	2009	92	37	—	—	—	—		Intuition
"Winner" (featuring Justin Timberlake and T.I.)	2010	28	65	—	23	28	—		Best Night of My Life
"Living Better Now" (featuring Rick Ross)	2010	—	81	—	—	—	—		Best Night of My Life
"Fall for Your Type" (featuring Drake)	2010	50	1	—	—	—	—		Best Night of My Life
"Best Night of My Life" (featuring Wiz Khalifa)	2011	— (Note: "Best Night of My Life" did not enter the Billboard Hot 100, but peaked at number eight on the Bubbling Under Hot 100 Singles chart.)	12	—	—	—	—		Best Night of My Life
"Party Ain't a Party" (featuring 2 Chainz)	2014	—	—	—	—	—	—		—N/a
"Ain't My Fault"	2014	—	—	—	—	—	—		Hollywood: A Story of a Dozen Roses
"You Changed Me" (featuring Chris Brown)	2015	93	32	—	—	—	—		Hollywood: A Story of a Dozen Roses
"Baby's in Love" (featuring Kid Ink)	2015	—	—	—	—	—	—		Hollywood: A Story of a Dozen Roses
"In Love by Now"	2015	—	110	—	—	—	—		Hollywood: A Story of a Dozen Roses
"—" denotes a recording that did not chart or was not released in that territory.

=== As featured artist ===
List of singles as featured artist, with selected chart positions, showing year released and album name
Title	Year	Peak chart positions							Certifications	Album
Title	Year	US	US R&B	AUS	CAN	IRL	NZ	UK	Certifications	Album
"Slow Jamz" (Twista featuring Kanye West and Jamie Foxx)	2003	1	1	26	—	30	9	3	RIAA: 3× Platinum; BPI: Gold; RMNZ: 2× Platinum	Kamikaze / The College Dropout
"Gold Digger" (Kanye West featuring Jamie Foxx)	2005	1	1	1	5	3	1	2	RIAA: 8× Platinum; ARIA: Platinum; BPI: 4× Platinum; RMNZ: 6× Platinum	Late Registration
"Georgia" (Field Mob featuring Ludacris and Jamie Foxx)	2005	39	31	—	—	—	—	—		Light Poles and Pine Trees
"Live in the Sky" (T.I. featuring Jamie Foxx)	2006	—	59	—	—	—	—	—		King
"Please Excuse My Hands" (Plies featuring Jamie Foxx and The-Dream)	2008	66	8	—	—	—	—	—		Definition of Real
"Where's the Love?" (The Black Eyed Peas featuring The World)	2016	—	—	15	—	—	—	47		non-album-single
"—" denotes a recording that did not chart or was not released in that territory.

== Other charted songs ==
List of songs, with selected chart positions, showing year released and album name
Title	Year	Peak chart positions	Album
Title	Year	US R&B	Album
"I Don't Need It" (featuring Timbaland)	2008	38	Intuition
"Number One" (featuring Lil Wayne)	2008	— (Note: "Number One" did not enter the Billboard Hot R&B/Hip-Hop Songs, but peaked at number seven on the Bubbling Under R&B/Hip-Hop Songs chart.)	Intuition
"Speak French" (featuring Gucci Mane)	2010	90	Best Night of My Life
"Jam" (Kevin Gates featuring Trey Songz, Ty Dolla Sign and Jamie Foxx)	2016	29	Islah
"Dearly Beloved" (Wale featuring Jamie Foxx)	2021	52	Folarin 2
"—" denotes a recording that did not chart or was not released in that territory.

== Guest appearances ==
Song	Year	Artist(s)	Album
"T-Shirt & Panties"	1998	Adina Howard	Woo OST
"Scream Shout"	2000	Melvin Riley	Bedroom Stories
"Where Home Is"	2003	MC Lyte	Da Undaground Heat, Vol. 1
"Slow Jamz”	2004	Twista, Kanye West	Kamikaze
"Build You Up"	2005	50 Cent	The Massacre
"When I Get You Home"	2005	Twista, Pharrell Williams	The Day After
"Best Dress"	2006	LL Cool J	Todd Smith
"Partners for Life"	2006	Diddy	Press Play
"Around the World"	2006	Game	Doctor's Advocate
"Psst!!"	2006	Snoop Dogg	Tha Blue Carpet Treatment
"She Goes All the Way"	2007	Rascal Flatts	Still Feels Good
"Contagious"	2008	Ludacris	Theater of the Mind
"Decisions"	2009	Busta Rhymes, Mary J. Blige, John Legend, Common	Back on My B.S.
"Hustle Blood"	2010	Big Boi	Sir Lucious Left Foot: The Son of Chico Dusty
"Where Do We Go"	2011	Pitbull	Planet Pit
"Hallelujah"	2012	Game	Jesus Piece
"Déjà Vu"	2014	Dionne Warwick	Feels So Good
"Focus"	2015	Ariana Grande	Dangerous Woman
"Jam"	2016	Kevin Gates, Trey Songz, Ty Dolla Sign	Islah
"Climb Ev'ry Mountain"	2016	Barbra Streisand	Encore: Movie Partners Sing Broadway
"She Feelin Nice"	2020	Pop Smoke	Shoot for the Stars, Aim for the Moon (Delxue)
"Dearly Beloved"	2021	Wale	Folarin 2
"No Way"	2021	Roddy Ricch	Live Life Fast

== Production discography ==
List of producer and songwriting credits (excluding guest appearances, interpolations, and samples)
Track(s)	Year	Credit	Artist(s)	Album
3. "Baby It's On"	1997	Producer	By Chance	Gotta Get That Lovin
"Swerve On"	1997	Producer	Adina Howard	(Freak) And U Know It (Single)
7. "T-Shirt & Panties"	1998	Producer (with Billy Moss)	Adina Howard	Various artists – Woo Soundtrack
7. "Any Given Sunday"; (featuring Guru and Common)	2000	Producer	Jamie Foxx	Various artists – Any Given Sunday Soundtrack
16. "Any Given Sunday (Outro)"	2000	Producer	Jamie Foxx	Various artists – Any Given Sunday Soundtrack
16. "Bed Springs"	2000	Producer	Jamie Foxx	Various artists – Bait Soundtrack
9. "Let’s Make A Baby"	2000	Songwriter	D'wayne Wiggins	Eyes Never Lie
2. "Da Intro (Skit)"	2003	Producer	Keith Murray	He's Keith Murray
5. "Star (Skit)"	2003	Producer	Keith Murray	He's Keith Murray
8. "Sucka Free (Skit)"	2003	Producer	Keith Murray	He's Keith Murray
12. "B.C. (Skit)"	2003	Producer	Keith Murray	He's Keith Murray
17. "Psst"; (featuring Jamie Foxx)	2006	Producer	Snoop Dogg	Tha Blue Carpet Treatment
"Fool Wit U"	2006	Songwriter	Chapter 4	Non-album single
15. "Love Brings Change"	2008	Producer	Jamie Foxx	Intuition
10. "Let Me Get You On Your Toes"	2010	Producer	Jamie Foxx	Best Night of My Life
12. "Sleeping Pill"	2010	Producer	Jamie Foxx	Best Night of My Life
14. "All Said and Done"	2010	Producer	Jamie Foxx	Best Night of My Life
15. "Sex on the Beach"	2010	Producer	Jamie Foxx	Best Night of My Life
12. "100 Black Coffins"	2012	Producer	Rick Ross	Various artists – Django Unchained Soundtrack
