= B. Scott =

American television personality

- Born: March 21, 1981 (age 45); Franklin, Virginia, U.S.
- Education: University of North Carolina at Chapel Hill (BA)
- Years active: 2007–present
- Known for: Internet; radio; television; entertainment
- Website: www.lovebscott.com

Brandon Scott Sessoms, best known as B. Scott (born March 21, 1981), is an American television personality, radio show host and internet celebrity who is known for their YouTube videoblogs and their website, LoveBScott.com. They are also a contributing editor to The Glam Network, and an Ebony Magazine advice columnist.

Scott, who is transgender and non-binary, has become a popular internet personality through their video blogging and their website. Scott has interviewed celebrities such as Mariah Carey, Ne-Yo, Chaka Khan, Aubrey O'Day and Ashanti. They have appeared in the mainstream media, making appearances on The Tyra Banks Show and shows on Oxygen and BET.

== Early life ==
Scott was born in Franklin, Virginia, and was raised in Hertford County, North Carolina, by parents of African-American, Irish, Jewish and Meherrin ancestry. As a teenager, Scott was selected to attend the North Carolina School of Science and Mathematics (NCSSM), a two-year public residential high school for students with a strong aptitude and interest in mathematics and science, located in Durham, North Carolina. After graduating from NCSSM in 1999, they attended the University of North Carolina at Chapel Hill and came out as gay in their sophomore year. They said in a video blog that they had feelings and were questioning previously but when they were a sophomore pre-med, they got their first romantic kiss from a man and realized they were attracted to men, and that they were using the intense pre-med education to distract themself from their sexuality. They stopped efforts to become a physician from the realization that it was a self-created distraction. Scott graduated in 2002 with a B.A. in Psychology. Scott moved to Washington, D.C., where they briefly practiced as a licensed realtor in the Capitol Hill area.

In June 2005, Scott moved to Los Angeles, California, where they continued their work in real estate and as an interior designer. It was during this time that they began their interest in the entertainment industry, while briefly working in print ads as a fashion model.

== Video blogging and LoveBScott.com ==
On January 1, 2007, Scott launched LoveBScott.com which primarily focuses on five pillars in pop culture: celebrity news, fashion, music, nightlife, and miscellaneous entertainment. The intent is to approach entertainment and celebrity news with a positive spin. The name lovebscott.com was selected in an effort to give their website a readily-identifiable personality with the mission of conveying a positive outlook. In May 2007, B. Scott started incorporating YouTube videos into their website to personally connect with readers. The videos include personal observations, celebrity news, musical performances, political commentary, interviews and messages of encouragement to the audience. The videos are produced out of their Los Angeles residence. Their YouTube channel has over 90,000 subscribers, and has won numerous awards for viewership and subscriptions. Scott has won the Best Video Blog by The Black Weblog Awards in 2007 and 2008. In January 2008 Scott became a YouTube company partner.

In 2009, they created The B. Scott Show, a talk/variety-style internet show that ran concurrent to the original videoblog. Interview subjects included celebrities and important figures in the LGBT community. Interviews are conducted in Scott's home and broadcast on both the YouTube channel and the website. Celebrities interviewed have included Ne-Yo, Ashanti, Eva Marcille, LeToya Luckett of Destiny's Child, Mariah Carey, Jordin Sparks, and Chilli (of TLC). Scott's YouTube channel has led to recognition from numerous celebrities. Popular blogger Perez Hilton in 2007 named Scott his "Favorite New YouTuber". In addition, on June 19, 2009, Academy Award winner Jamie Foxx declared on his Sirius Satellite Radio channel "The Foxxhole", "I love B. Scott. [They're] very attractive. [They look] like a cross between Prince, Rosario Dawson and Lenny Kravitz." This unsolicited acclaim helped open B. Scott to a new level of recognition.

== Radio ==
In April 2010, they premiered The B. Scott Show on Jamie Foxx's channel, The Foxxhole, on Sirius XM Satellite Radio. The premiere guest was former Destiny's Child member, Michelle Williams. The show was broadcast on Monday nights at 9 pm ET on Sirius 106 and XM 149. It was announced via Twitter that Scott would be discontinuing the radio show for personal reasons.

== Television ==
In 2010, Scott appeared on The Tyra Banks Show as part of the "Ambush Stranger Makeovers" segment and Oxygen's Hair Battle Spectacular as a guest judge. Prior to these appearances, Scott was a featured contributor to *Extra*. Scott was also featured in "Too Hot to Handle," a 2013 season 2 episode of *Chef Roblé & Co.* on Bravo.

=== 2013 BET Awards: 106 & Park Pre-Show Controversy ===
In 2013, Scott served as a red carpet correspondent for *Style Stage* at the *2013 BET Awards: 106 & Park Pre-Show*. They were aired live at the Nokia Theatre in Los Angeles on June 30. Prior to the awards show, Black Entertainment Television (BET) aired a pre-show with Scott as the sole style correspondent. They were scheduled to conduct at least 12 one-on-one interviews but only completed the first one, before being pulled from the stage during the second.

Scott, known for openly sharing personal experiences, alleged that after the first segment, they were pulled backstage and forced "to pull my hair back, asked me to take off my makeup, made me change my clothes and prevented me from wearing a heel." The outfit had been pre-approved, but they were told it was unacceptable. Scott agreed to change into men's clothes but was never put back on air, instead being replaced by singer Adrienne Bailon. BET issued a statement calling it a matter of miscommunication and expressing regret for any offense caused. Scott dismissed the BET statement as a non-apology.

In August 2013, Scott filed a lawsuit against BET and its parent company Viacom for discrimination based on gender identity, gender expression, and sexual orientation. They sought $2.5 million in damages. In January 2014, *TMZ* obtained and released internal emails indicating that BET executives had discussed their desire to prevent Scott from appearing "too feminine" on air. Network Vice President Rhonda Cowen responded, suggesting Scott be "less 'womanly.'" Another BET executive, Monica Ware, advised avoiding public disclosure of the reasons for the dress code change. *Huffington Post* also confirmed *TMZ*'s reporting on the internal emails.

In April 2014, BET won the lawsuit when Los Angeles Superior Court Judge Yvette Palazuelos ruled that BET's right to control its creative expression, including managing on-screen talent attire, was protected by the First Amendment, ultimately overruling Scott's claims of discrimination.

Scott appealed and settled the lawsuit for an undisclosed amount with BET in February 2015.

In March 2021, BET announced that Scott would produce and host a new show on their network, *Twenties: The After Show*. Scott expressed pride in making history as the first trans non-binary person to host and executive produce a show at BET, stating, "I am in a place of forgiveness and I am honored to help turn the page on the past and be a part of the network's move toward a more inclusive future for everyone."

== Podcast ==
In 2015, Scott launched 'The B. Scott Show' podcast as a successor to their YouTube series of the same name. According to the show's description, "B. Scott, the ‘Queen of Tea,' serves up the hottest tea in pop culture with lovebscott.com's editor Denver Sean, signature one-on-one interviews and ‘Ask B. Scott' advice."

== Other appearances ==
Since March 2007, Scott has been hired as a celebrity talent; contributing to several publications and hosting events.

On June 7, 2007, Scott hosted the "White Party" at the Hollywood Black Film Festival in Los Angeles. They also hosted this event in Summer 2008.

On April 4, 2008, Scott kicked off gay Pride month at Yale University. During the festivities they were at the forefront of three events. Scott hosted a Master's Tea at Yale University's Silliman College, a "Pride Meet and Greet" at Bespoke Restaurant and "After-party" at the Center Street Lounge in New Haven, CT.

On October 19, 2008, Scott led a team for the AIDS Walk Los Angeles and hosted the official AIDS Walk Los Angeles afterparty at Eleven Restaurant & Nightclub in West Hollywood. CA.

On February 28, 2009, Scott attended the 14th Annual Black Solidarity Conference at Yale University as a featured panelists on the "Disrobed: An Exposé of Black Sexuality" panel.

In early 2010, following their interview with Mariah Carey, Scott appeared in their video for "Up Out My Face" featuring Nicki Minaj.

In March 2010, Scott was the featured panelist for the first "Out in the Spotlight" panel discussion at Morehouse College. This appearance, hosted by Morehouse's Safe Space LGBT Organization, was the college's first step at creating a bridge to the LGBTQ community.

== Personal life ==
In March 2021, Scott stated "I am a trans non-binary person and I use they/them pronouns. My gender identity, who I am on the inside, doesn't fit the binary labels of 'man' or 'woman'."

== Awards ==
In 2014 Scott was included as part of the Advocate's annual "40 under 40" list. In 2016, Scott was included in OUT Magazine's OUT 100. The publication wrote, "Multimedia maven and androsexual B. Scott has come into his own in the past year, his cross-platform presence stronger than ever. At the 2013 BET Awards, he was instructed to dress more gender-normative, then plucked from his red-carpet-covering post. It was a slap in the face for the gender-nonconforming pop culture blogger, who was wearing a tunic, heels, and full makeup. But in 2015, he emerged from the subsequent discrimination lawsuit on a higher plane, with his own successful celebrity news and entertainment website, video opportunities, and an undisclosed settlement sum in the bank. Says Scott, 'I am triumphing.'"
