= The Poetess =

American rapper

Felicia Morris, better known by her stage name, The Poetess, is an American rapper and radio personality.

== Career ==
Morris made her radio debut at the age of five on KDIA-AM, a soul station in the San Francisco Bay Area, where her father, Johnny Morris, worked as a disc jockey. She later moved to Los Angeles and got her first broadcasting experience as a co-host on Bailey Broadcasting's nationally syndicated "Hip Hop Countdown and Report". Since 1989, she has appeared regularly on the radio as an authority on black music.

Morris directed her long-term interest in poetry into writing rap songs, and was offered a recording contract with Poetic Groove/Interscope Records in 1992. Her debut album Simply Poetry featured guest appearances from Jamie Foxx, Def Jef and Kool G. Rap. The first single from the album, "Love Hurts", made the Top 10 on The Gavin Report's Rap Radio Charts.

Morris joined the staff of Los Angeles station KKBT/92.3 The Beat (later 100.3 The Beat) in 1994. As a DJ she introduced the music of Erykah Badu and Lauryn Hill, and conducted interviews with various musicians and celebrities. She subsequently became the community affairs director for 100.3 The Beat, discussing issues such as gang violence, economic empowerment and health awareness, and organizing voter registration drives, school supply give-a-ways, community rallies, and health awareness campaigns.

Morris left KKBT-FM Los Angeles in 2007 after 13 years, and a year later joined The Foxxhole on SiriusXM radio, a comedy and entertainment network executive produced by Jamie Foxx. Morris served as co-host and mistress of information on The Jamie Foxx Show, and produced The Sheryl Underwood Show, 5150 Show with Corey Holcomb, Voice of Reason with Zo Williams, and The Foxxhole Comedy Corner. In 2014, she founded Morris Media Studios, a professional podcast studio in Los Angeles.

Morris contributed a chapter to the 2009 book Family Affair: What It Means to be African American Today in which she described her past relationship, starting in 1994, with a gang member anonymised as "MC".

== Discography ==
- 1992: Simply Poetry (debut album)
- 1994: Peep This by Jamie Foxx (rap on "Dog House")
