= Jamie Foxx filmography =

List of films featuring Jamie Foxx

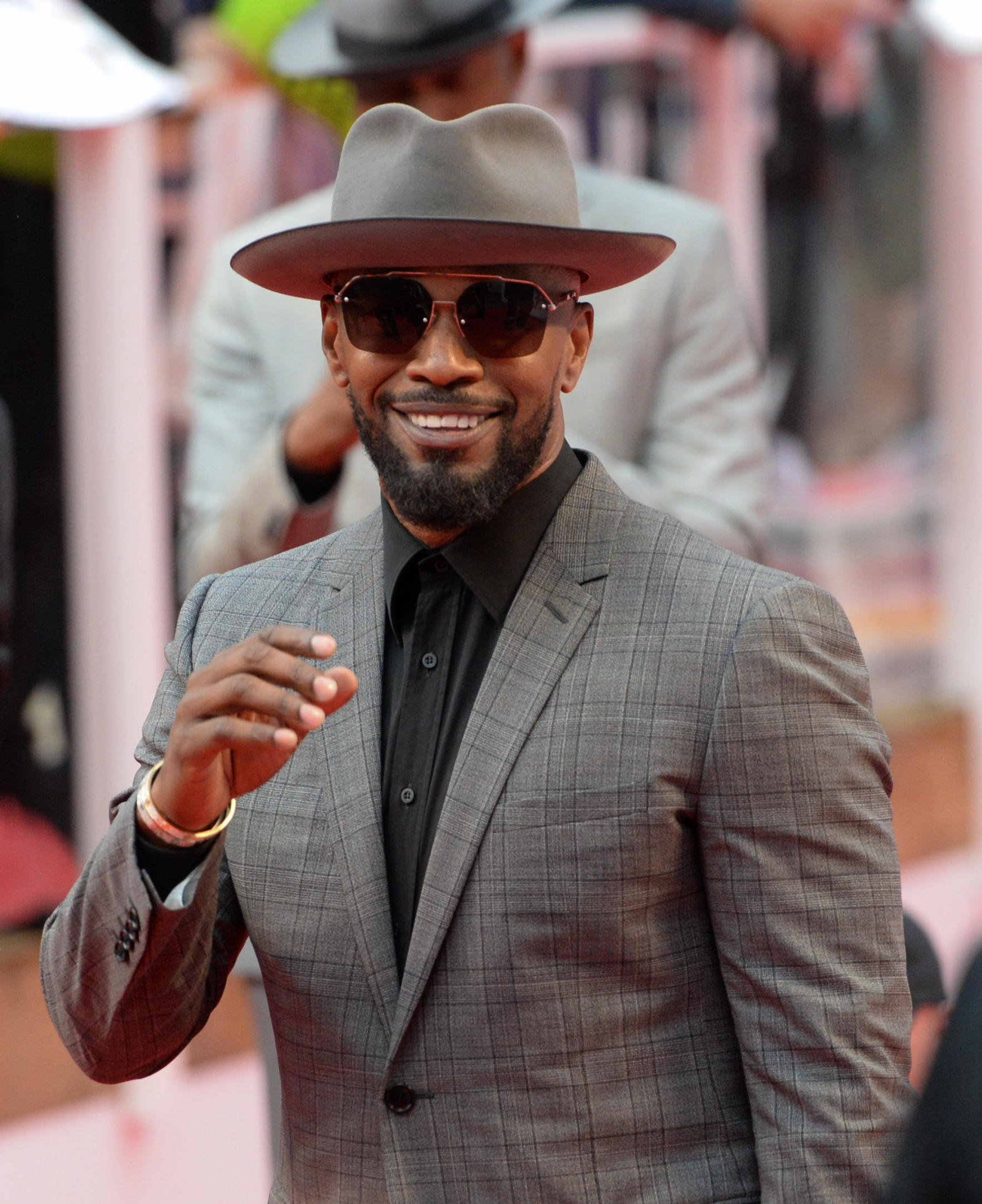
Foxx at the 2019 TIFF.

The following is the filmography of American actor, comedian, and singer Jamie Foxx.

== Film ==
Year	Title	Role	Notes	Refs.
1992	Toys	Baker		
1996	The Truth About Cats & Dogs	Ed		
1996	The Great White Hype	Hassan El Ruk'n		
1997	Booty Call	Bunz		
1998	The Players Club	Blue		
1999	Any Given Sunday	Willie Beamen		
2000	Held Up	Michael		
2000	Bait	Alvin Sanders		
2001	Ali	Drew Bundini Brown		
2003	Shade	Larry Jennings		
2004	Breakin' All the Rules	Quincy Watson		
2004	Collateral	Max Durocher		
2004	Ray	Ray Charles		
2005	Stealth	Lt. Henry Purcell		
2005	Jarhead	Staff Sgt. Sykes		
2006	Miami Vice	Ricardo Tubbs		
2006	Dreamgirls	Curtis Taylor Jr.		
2007	The Kingdom	Ronald Fleury		
2009	The Soloist	Nathaniel Ayers		
2009	Law Abiding Citizen	Nick Rice		
2010	Valentine's Day	Kelvin Moore		
2010	Due Date	Darryl		
2010	I'm Still Here	Himself	Mockumentary	
2011	Rio	Nico (voice)		
2011	Horrible Bosses	Dean "Motherfucker" Jones		
2012	Django Unchained	Django Freeman		
2013	White House Down	President James Sawyer		
2013	...And She Was My Eve	—N/a	Director, short film	
2014	Rio 2	Nico (voice)		
2014	The Amazing Spider-Man 2	Maxwell "Max" Dillon / Electro		
2014	A Million Ways to Die in the West	Django Freeman	Uncredited cameo	
2014	Horrible Bosses 2	Dean "Motherfucker" Jones		
2014	Annie	William Stacks		
2017	Sleepless	Vincent Downs		
2017	Welcome to My Life	Himself	Documentary	
2017	Baby Driver	Leon "Bats" Jefferson III		
2018	Robin Hood	Little John		
2019	The Black Godfather	Himself	Documentary	
2019	Just Mercy	Walter McMillian		
2019	QT8: The First Eight	Himself	Documentary	
2020	Project Power	Art Reilly		
2020	Soul	Joseph "Joe" Gardner (voice)		
2021	Spider-Man: No Way Home	Maxwell "Max" Dillon / Electro		
2022	Day Shift	Bud Jablonski	Also executive producer	
2023	God Is a Bullet	The Ferryman		
2023	They Cloned Tyrone	Slick Charles	Also producer	
2023	Strays	Bug (voice)		
2023	The Burial	Willie E. Gary	Also producer	
2024	Luther: Never Too Much	Himself	Documentary, also producer	
2024	Not Another Church Movie	God		
2025	Back in Action	Matt	Also executive producer	
2025	Tin Soldier	Bokushi		
2025	Being Eddie	Himself	Documentary	
TBA	Geechee †	—N/a	Producer only, Post-production	
TBA	Fight for '84 †	TBA	Post-production, also producer	
TBA	All-Star Weekend †	Malik	Completed, also director, writer, and producer	

Key
†	Denotes films that have not yet been released

== Television ==
Year	Title	Role	Notes	Refs.
1991–1994	In Living Color	Various	Main cast, 95 episodes	
1992–93	Roc	Crazy George	7 episodes	
1993	Jamie Foxx: Straight from the Foxxhole	Himself	Stand-up special	
1996	Hangin' with Mr. Cooper	Coach Armstrong	Episode: "Rivals"	
1996	Moesha	Woody	Episode: "Driving Miss Moesha"	
1996–2001	The Jamie Foxx Show	Jamie King, Tyrone Koppel	100 episodes, also creator, director and executive producer	
2000, 2012	Saturday Night Live	Himself (host)	Episodes: "Jamie Foxx/Blink-182" and "Jamie Foxx/Ne-Yo"	
2001	2001 MTV Video Music Awards	Himself (host)	Television special	
2002	Jamie Foxx: I Might Need Security	Himself	Stand-up special	
2003	Jamie Foxx Unleashed: Lost, Stolen and Leaked!	Himself	Stand-up special	
2003	2003 ESPY Awards	Himself (host)	Television special	
2004	Redemption: The Stan Tookie Williams Story	Stan "Tookie" Williams	Television film	
2004	Chappelle's Show	Black Tony Blair	Season 2, Episode 13	
2004	2004 ESPY Awards	Himself (host)	Television special	
2006	Sesame Street	Himself	Episode: "Cookie World"	
2007	Elmo's Christmas Countdown	Himself	Television special	
2009	BET Awards 2009	Himself (host)	Television special	
2011	Nite Tales: The Series	—N/a	Director, episode: "Last Laugh"	
2015	2015 iHeartRadio Music Awards	Himself (host)	Television special	
2016	Jackie Robinson	Jackie Robinson (voice)	2 episodes	
2017–present	Beat Shazam	Himself (host)	Also executive producer, did not host in 2023	
2017	White Famous	Himself	2 episodes, also executive producer	
2018	BET Awards 2018	Himself (host)	Television special	
2019	Live in Front of a Studio Audience	George Jefferson	Episode: "Norman Lear's All in the Family and The Jeffersons"	
2021	Dad Stop Embarrassing Me!	Brian Dixon	8 episodes, also co-creator, writer and executive producer	
2023–2025	Alert: Missing Persons Unit	—N/a	Creator, writer and executive producer	
2024	Jamie Foxx: What Had Happened Was...	Himself	Stand-up special	

== Music videos ==
Year	Title	Artist	Refs.
1996	"1, 2, 3, 4 (Sumpin' New)"	Coolio	
2004	"Slow Jamz"	Twista	
2005	"Gold Digger"	Kanye West	
2010	"We Are the World 25 for Haiti"	Artists for Haiti	
2010	"Yes"	LMFAO	
2017	"Sorry Not Sorry"	Demi Lovato	
2018	"Walk It Talk It"	Migos featuring Drake	
