= Welcome to My Life (film) =

- Theatrical poster
- Directed by: Andrew Sandler
- Produced by: Chris Brown; Andrew Listermann
- Starring: Chris Brown; Mary J. Blige; Jennifer Lopez; Rita Ora; DJ Khaled; Jamie Foxx; Mike Tyson; Usher; Tyga; Stephen Hill; Mark Pitts; Terrence Jenkins; Mark Geragos
- Music by: Kevin Lax
- Production company: Gravitas Ventures
- Distributed by: Riveting Entertainment
- Release date: June 7, 2017 (United States)
- Running time: 95 minutes
- Country: United States
- Language: English

Welcome to My Life is a 2017 self-documentary focused on the life and career of American R&B singer and dancer Chris Brown, directed by Andrew Sandler. Numerous celebrities, including Jennifer Lopez, Mike Tyson, Rita Ora, Usher and Tyga, participated in the film and shared anecdotes with Brown.

== Synopsis ==
The film analyzes Chris Brown's career and life as a whole. The artist was born in a poor and disadvantaged social context, in which he also suffers the harassment of a violent stepfather, until his mother found the courage to send that man away. Nevertheless, from an early age Brown managed to excel at school level and to get noticed thanks to a great charisma and predisposition for the musical arts. Afterwards he has a massive rise to fame, following the huge success of his first two albums, Chris Brown and Exclusive, while also starting a love relationship with singer Rihanna. Brown recounts how they met, how their relationship developed between bright and dark times, and the moment where the incident of domestic violence, for which he was subsequently convicted, took place. Brown dwells on his emotions, revealing to have had suicidal thoughts derived from his sense of guilt. In the trailer to the film, Brown says his reputation dropped sharply after his 2009 assault on Rihanna, "I went from being on top of the world, number one songs, being kind of like America's sweetheart, to being public enemy number one."

From here on, Brown explains the subsequent difficulties, the return to commercial success with his F.A.M.E. album, and the psychological problems and drug abuse that led him to other legal problems, ending up spending three months in jail. Then he focused on putting the pieces back together and building a new life with his partner Karrueche Tran. Brown recounts the feelings he felt during the three months spent in jail, being almost always in isolation, a condition imposed by his fame, expressing the way in which fans and loved ones supported him right at that moment, allowing him to obtain one of his greatest hits while incarcerated, with the song "Loyal". The artist also explained the ups and downs of his relationship with Tran and how, during a moment of pause in their relationship, he unwittingly conceived his first daughter Royalty Brown, definitively ending the relationship, but starting a new one as a parent, that deeply affected him as a man and artist. Brown concludes the documentary by talking about the moment when the judge in charge of following his case finally ended his probation period, starting a new phase in his life.

During various parts of the documentary, various celebrities and people that are part of Chris Brown's life share anecdotes about him, describing him from a human and professional point of view. Brown's mother also participates in the documentary.

== Cast ==
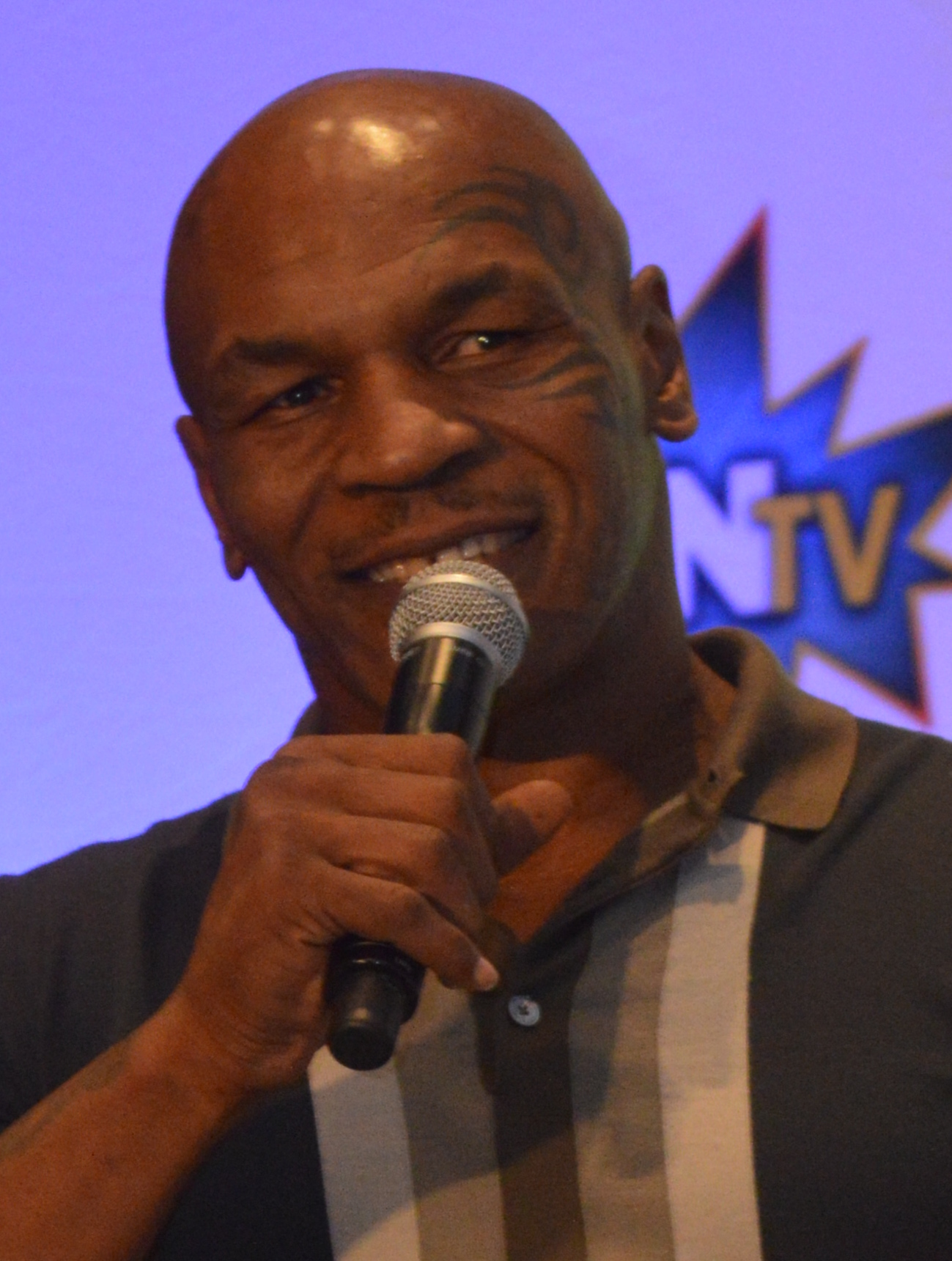
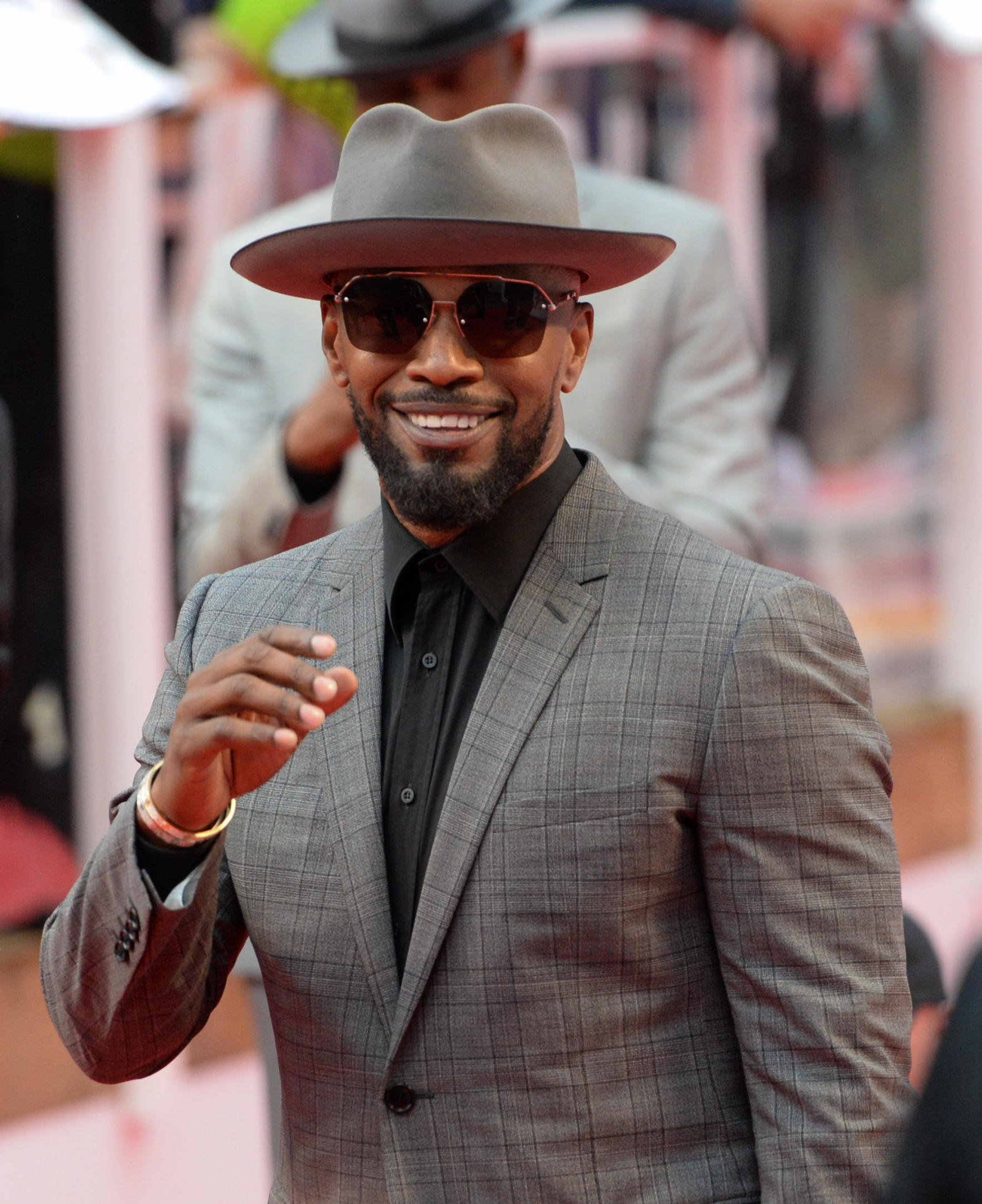
Celebrities such as Mike Tyson (left) and Jamie Foxx (right) share stories, and their point of view about certain Brown's private situations in the documentary.
- Chris Brown
- Mary J. Blige
- Jennifer Lopez
- Rita Ora
- DJ Khaled
- Jamie Foxx
- Mike Tyson
- Usher
- Tyga
- Stephen Hill
- Mark Pitts
- Terrence Jenkins
- Mark Geragos
- Joyce Hawkins

== Development ==
According to the official statement shared in conjunction with the publication of the movie, the documentary was made with the intention of allowing Brown to speak firsthand about his private affairs after years of tabloids profiting from them. The artist announced that he was working on the project in late 2015, then officially announcing it in March 2016. Singer Rihanna has granted Brown's permission to talk about her and show images that include her in the documentary, however preferring not to directly release her own testimony in the movie.

During a 2017 interview, the singer said it was important to become vulnerable during the shooting process of the documentary, to let his audience in on his personal life:

I think with this film it just embodied what my fans actually respect me for and them getting to know me a lot more instead of me painting an image or coming up on the radio or anywhere I go. I just let it be natural, be real, let it flow from the heart but at the same time just being a man about everything in its entirety and who I am as an artist.

== Marketing ==
The documentary's initial trailer was released in April 2016. The premiere took place on June 7, 2017 during an event that featured the presence of Brown, his family and those that participated in the making of the documentary, but also other celebrities such as Jhené Aiko, Kap G, Puff Daddy and Kid Ink. Its theatrical distribution included screening in a few selected cinemas exclusively in United States, United Kingdom and Mexico. Subsequently, the documentary was distributed worldwide by Netflix and through a home video publication and on demand market. Currently the work is no longer available in the Netflix catalog.

=== Soundtrack ===
For the documentary, Brown has released a track entitled "Welcome to My Life", in collaboration with rapper Cal Scruby.

== Reception ==
=== Critical response ===
The film was positively received by critics, it holds a 75% rating on Rotten Tomatoes based on 25 reviews. Craig Jenkins of Vulture defined the movie as "one of the strangest music documentaries I’ve ever seen", stating that it's "star-studded but sort of sketchy", finding it to be "all the way honest" with Brown being "hoarse and glassy-eyed in spots, lucid but struggling through the daunting business of owning his many faults", ending up saying that "the most illuminating scene is one where he says abuse is “learned behavior,” remembering the boyfriend who brutalized his mother through his childhood". Reviewing the documentary, Rachel Leah of Salon talked about what the singer said on domestic violence, stating: "Chris Brown's actions are inexcusable, but what he says about male violence is vital".

=== Box office ===
Although theatrical distribution has been limited, where the film was released it has achieved generally good success, having most of its venues sold out. Welcome to My Life sold, between domestic DVD sales and domestic blu-ray sales, more than 70,000 copies.
