= DJ Play a Love Song =

Single by Jamie Foxx featuring Twista

from the album Unpredictable
- Released: January 10, 2006
- Length: 4:18
- Label: J
- Songwriters: Sean Garrett; Jamal Jones; Jason Perry
- Producers: Polow da Don; Garrett

Jamie Foxx singles chronology
"Unpredictable" (2005)	"DJ Play a Love Song" (2006)	"Live in the Sky" (2006)

Twista singles chronology
"Hit the Floor" (2005)	"DJ Play a Love Song" (2006)	"So Lonely" (2006)

"DJ Play a Love Song" is a song by American singer and actor Jamie Foxx. It was written by Sean Garrett, Jamal Jones, and Jason Perry for his second album, Unpredictable (2005), while production was helmed by Garrett and Jones under his production moniker Polow da Don. The song features additional vocals by rapper Twista. It was released as the album's second single in early 2006. A video for the song co-stars America's Next Top Model winner Eva Pigford.

== Chart performance ==
DJ Play a Love Song debuted at number 90 on the US Billboard Hot 100 chart, on the week of May 6, 2006. After climbing for the chart for 12 weeks, the song eventually reached its peak at number 45 on the chart. The song also peaked at number five on the US Hot R&B/Hip-Hop Songs chart in June 2006. On December 11, 2006, the single was certified gold by the Recording Industry Association of America (RIAA) for sales of over 500,000 copies in the United States.

The song was released in the UK as a download only third single from the album but failed to chart.

== Formats and track listings ==
US download

1. "DJ Play A Love Song (No Rap version) - 3:51

UK download #1

1. "DJ Play A Love Song (Remix version 1 - Dirty) - 4:08

UK download #2

1. "DJ Play A Love Song (Remix version 2 - Dirty) - 3:50

== Charts ==
=== Weekly charts ===
Chart (2006)	Peak position
US Billboard Hot 100	45
US Hot R&B/Hip-Hop Songs (Billboard)	5
US Rhythmic Airplay (Billboard)	34

=== Year-end charts ===
Chart (2006)	Position
US Hot R&B/Hip-Hop Songs (Billboard)	36

== Certifications ==
Region	Certification	Certified units/sales
United States (RIAA)	Gold	500,000^{^}
^{^} Shipments figures based on certification alone.

== Release history ==
Region	Date
United States	January 10, 2006
United Kingdom	September 11, 2006
