= Living Better Now =

Single by Jamie Foxx featuring Rick Ross

from the album Best Night of My Life
- Released: November 2, 2010
- Recorded: 2010; Hit Factory Criteria (Miami, Florida)
- Genre: R&B; hip hop
- Length: 4:08
- Label: J
- Songwriters: Bink; Jamie Foxx; Ernie Isley; Marvin Isley; O'Kelly Isley; Ronald Isley; Rudolph Isley; Christopher Jasper; Rico Love; Breyon Prescott; William Roberts II; Bishop; Breyon Prescott; Tony Scales
- Producers: Bink; Rico Love

Jamie Foxx singles chronology
| "Winner" (2010) | "Living Better Now" (2010) | "Fall for Your Type" (2010) |

Rick Ross singles chronology
| "Aston Martin Music" (2010) | "Living Better Now" (2010) | "Welcome to My Hood" (2011) |

"Living Better Now" is a song by American singer and actor Jamie Foxx, released on November 2, 2010, as the second single for his fourth studio album Best Night of My Life (2010). It features American rapper Rick Ross and samples "Big Poppa" by The Notorious B.I.G.

== Track listing ==
Digital download

1. "Living Better Now" (featuring Rick Ross) - 4:08

== Charts ==
| Chart (2010) | Peak position |
|---|---|
| US Hot R&B/Hip-Hop Songs (Billboard) | 81 |

== Release history ==
| Country | Date | Format | Label |
|---|---|---|---|
| United States | November 2, 2010 | Digital download | J Records |
| United States | November 9, 2010 | Rhythmic contemporary | J Records |
| United States | November 9, 2010 | Urban contemporary | J Records |
