= Extravaganza (song) =

Single by Jamie Foxx featuring Kanye West

from the album Unpredictable
- Released: October 4, 2005
- Length: 4:15
- Label: J
- Songwriters: Kanye West; Mike City
- Producer: Mike City

Jamie Foxx singles chronology
"Gold Digger" (2005)	"Extravaganza" (2005)	"Georgia" (2005)

Kanye West singles chronology
"Number One" (2005)	"Extravaganza" (2005)	"Heard 'Em Say" (2005)

"Extravaganza" is a song by American R&B singer and actor Jamie Foxx, taken from his second album Unpredictable (2005). It features rapper Kanye West. The song, written by Foxx and Mike City, peaked at number 52 on US Hot R&B/Hip-Hop Songs chart in October 2005. It also peaked at number 43 on the UK Singles Chart, becoming his first charting single on the chart as lead artist.

== Background ==
"Extravaganza" was originally set to be the first single in Foxx's second album, Unpredictable, but was pushed back in favor of the title track. The track was one of the first songs leaked off the album before its release date, under the original title "One Night Extravaganza". However, the song was only released as a single in the UK and Australia in June 2006.

== Music video ==
A music video for "Extravaganza" was directed by Paul Hunter. It does not feature Kanye West.

== Track listings ==
UK CD single and digital download
No.	Title	Writer(s)	Producer(s)	Length
1.	"Extravaganza" (featuring Kanye West)	Mike City; Kanye West	City	4:15
2.	"One Too Many Drinks (Extravaganza)"	City; West; Ricky Walters	City; Foxx^{[a]}	4:37
3.	"Extravaganza" (Shux remix)	City; West	Mike City; Shux^{[a]}	3:55
4.	"Don't Know You Anymore"	City	City	3:46

Notes

- ^{^[a]} signifies additional producers

Sample credits

- "One Too Many Drinks (Extravaganza)" contains a sample from "Children's Story" as written and performed by Ricky Walters.

== Charts ==
Chart performance for "Extravaganza"
Chart (2005)	Peak position
Australia (ARIA)	44
Germany (GfK)	99
UK Singles Chart	43
US Hot R&B/Hip-Hop Songs (Billboard)	52

== Release history ==
Release history for "Extravaganza"
Region	Date
United States	October 4, 2005
United Kingdom	June 19, 2006
