= You Changed Me =

Single by Jamie Foxx featuring Chris Brown

from the album Hollywood: A Story of a Dozen Roses
- Released: March 12, 2015
- Recorded: 2015
- Genre: R&B
- Label: RCA
- Songwriters: Kevin Cossom; Chris Brown
- Producers: Boi-1da; Vinylz; DJ Scout

Jamie Foxx singles chronology
"Ain't My Fault" (2014)	"You Changed Me" (2015)	"Baby's In Love" (2015)

Chris Brown singles chronology
"Five More Hours" (2015)	"You Changed Me" (2015)	"Do It Again" (2015)

Music video
- "You Changed Me" on YouTube

"You Changed Me" is a song by American singer and actor Jamie Foxx featuring Chris Brown. It was released on March 12, 2015 as the second single from his fifth studio album Hollywood: A Story of a Dozen Roses (2015).

== Music video ==
A music video for the song, directed by Director X, was premiered on May 29, 2015. An official behind-the-scenes video was released to Foxx's VEVO channel on June 3, 2015. Empire actress Grace Gealey made a cameo appearance as Foxx's love interest. Rapper Alexandra Reid from the South Korean Girl-Group BP Rania also makes a cameo as Chris Brown's love interest.

== Charts ==
Chart (2015)	Peak position
US Billboard Hot 100	93
US Adult R&B Songs (Billboard)	8
US Hot R&B/Hip-Hop Songs (Billboard)	32
US R&B/Hip-Hop Airplay (Billboard)	21

== Release history ==
Country	Date	Format	Label	Ref.
United States	March 12, 2015	Digital download	RCA Records	
