= Unpredictable (Jamie Foxx album) =

Studio album by Jamie Foxx
- Released: December 20, 2005
- Length: 62:25
- Label: J
- Producers: Babyface; Charlie Bereal; Bigg D; Warryn Campbell; Mike City; Mr. Collipark; Ron Feemster; Sean Garrett; R.L. Huggar; Daron Jones; Jim Jonsin; Mateo Laboriel; Harold Lilly; No I.D.; Polow da Don; Miykal Snoddy; Tank; Timbaland

Jamie Foxx chronology
Peep This (1994)	Unpredictable (2005)	Intuition (2008)

Singles from Unpredictable
- 1. "Extravaganza" Released: October 4, 2005; 2. "Unpredictable" Released: October 18, 2005; 3. "DJ Play a Love Song" Released: January 10, 2006; 4. "Can I Take U Home" Released: 2006

Unpredictable is the second studio album by American singer and actor Jamie Foxx. It was released on December 20, 2005, by J Records. Recording sessions for the album took place between 2004 and 2005, with production contributions from Timbaland, Mike City, Sean Garrett, Jim Jonsin, and others. Serving as the follow-up to Peep This (1994), the project marked his first studio release in eleven years.

Upon its release, Unpredictable received generally mixed reviews from music critics, who were ambivalent towards its lyrical content and production. The album debuted at number two on the US Billboard 200 chart, selling 597,000 copies in its first week. It eventually peaked at number one and was certified double platinum by the Recording Industry Association of America (RIAA). The album was supported by four singles: "Extravaganza" featuring Kanye West, the title track featuring Ludacris, "DJ Play a Love Song" featuring Twista, and "Can I Take U Home".

== Critical reception ==
Professional ratings
Aggregate scores
Source	Rating
Metacritic	52/100
Review scores
Source	Rating
AllMusic	3.5/5 stars
Robert Christgau	(dud)
Entertainment Weekly	C−
The Guardian	1/5 stars
HipHopDX	4/5 stars
Los Angeles Times	2.5/4 stars
Now	2/5 Ns
Rolling Stone	3/5 stars
Paste	3/5 stars
Vibe	3.5/5 stars

Unpredictable received polarized reviews from music critics. At Metacritic, which assigns a normalized rating out of 100 to reviews from critics, the album received an average score of 52, which indicates "mixed or average reviews", based on 16 reviews. AllMusic editor Andy Kellman found that though he "fits somewhere between R. Kelly and Ginuwine, Foxx has more than enough personality and talent to defend his music against accusations of opportunism. He can belt and proclaim with authority, but he's best when he's smooth and mellow – an asset, to be sure, since not many modern R&B vocalists trade in subtleties." Christian Hoard from Rolling Stone felt that "when the album works, it's because of Foxx's easy charm and A-list confidence, which staves off overkill while he's dropping lush, insistent melodies on well-conceived love odes like "VIP." Foxx wrote or co-wrote nearly half the album and sprinkled hip-hop-flavored beats – among largely mellow fare, courtesy of veteran (if not terribly well known) R&B-producers." The Village Voice's Greg Tate wrote that "Foxx reveals across the breadth of Unpredictable that his real dream is to do Marvin Gaye [and] the album's guest list assures us that Unpredictable is pure product, buffed-and-shined modern R&B."

Richard Cromelin from The Los Angeles Times noted that producers on Unpredictable "create some rich, flavorful, state-of-the-art sonic settings, and Foxx's smooth, agile voice – lots of R. Kelly, a little Sam Cooke – is fine for the pleading and preening that mark his range on Unpredictable. Entertainment Weekly's Michael Endelman felt that the "album is exactly what you'd expect from this sort of vanity project: plenty of competent-if-generic R&B booty jams and Cristal-sippin' anthems with a who's who of cameos that only a suitcase of cash or celebrity status can snag. We know that Foxx can actually sing, but this ballad-heavy disc of clichéd wordplay and commonplace melodies proves his music career should've ended on screen." In a negative review for Now, Jason Richards remarked that Foxx "should focus on getting back to actin' before we have time to remember his solo album too well, cuz after you get past the fact that, wow, the guy can also sing, there isn't much left to these boring mid-tempo sex jams." Alex Petridis of The Guardian was also not impressed with the album, writing: "Unpredictable resembles another legendary thespian's venture into pop, William Shatner's 1968 opus The Transformed Man, in that you start to wonder whether Foxx is actually serious or not."

== Commercial performance ==
Unpredictable debuted at number two on the US Billboard 200 chart, selling 597,000 copies in its first week. The album debuted behind Mary J. Blige's The Breakthrough album. In its second week, the album climbed to number one on the chart, selling an additional 200,000 copies. Foxx became the fourth Academy Award-winning actor with a number-one album on the US Billboard 200 chart. In its third week, the album remained at number one on the chart, selling 131,000 more copies. In its fourth week, the album remained at number one on the chart, selling 103,000 copies. On March 24, 2006, the album was certified double platinum by the Recording Industry Association of America (RIAA) for sales of over two million copies in the United States.

== Track listing ==
Unpredictable track listing
No.	Title	Writer(s)	Producer(s)	Length
1.	"Unpredictable" (featuring Ludacris)	Harold Lilly; James Scheffer; Derrick Baker; Christopher Bridges	Jim Jonsin; Bigg D; Harold Lilly	3:39
2.	"Warm Bed"	Sean Garrett; Michael Crooms; Prentice Sprye	Sean Garrett; Mr. Collipark	3:53
3.	"DJ Play a Love Song" (featuring Twista)	Jamal Jones; Garrett; Jason Perry	Polow da Don; Sean Garrett	4:18
4.	"With You" (featuring The Game and Snoop Dogg)	Jamie Foxx; Tank; Charlie Bereal; Kenny Bereal; Nate Walton; Ainz Prasad	Tank; Jamie Foxx	4:20
5.	"Can I Take U Home"	Tim Mosley	Timbaland; Static Major^{[a]}	4:15
6.	"Love Changes" (featuring Mary J. Blige)	Skip Scarborough	Warryn "Baby Dubb" Campbell; Breyon Prescott^{[b]}	4:30
7.	"Extravaganza" (featuring Kanye West)	Mike City; Kanye West	Mike City	4:15
8.	"Three Letter Word"	Lilly; Ernest Smith; Michael Snoddy; Earl Klugh	Harold Lilly; No I.D.; Miykal Snoddy	4:42
9.	"Get This Money"	Mike City	Mike City	4:31
10.	"VIP"	Foxx; Mateo Laboriel; Tank; Herbie Hancock	Mateo Laboriel; Tank^{[a]}	3:54
11.	"Do What It Do"	Foxx; Tank; C. Bereal; K. Bereal	Jamie Foxx; Tank; Charlie Bereal	4:03
12.	"Storm (Forecass)"	R.L. Huggar; Daron Jones	Daron Jones; R.L. Huggar	4:27
13.	"U Still Got It (Interlude)" (featuring Common)	Foxx; Walton; Prasad	Jamie Foxx	2:47
14.	"Heaven"	Foxx	Babyface	3:54
15.	"Wish U Were Here"	Ron Feemster; Foxx; Tank; Joseph "Lonny" Bereal; Prescott	Ron "Neff-U" Feemster	4:13
Total length:				62:25

Notes

- ^{^[a]} signifies vocal producer(s)
- ^{^[b]} signifies co-producer(s)

Sample credits

- "Three Letter Word" contains a sample from "Kari", written and performed by Earl Klugh.
- "VIP" contains a sample from "Butterfly", written and performed by Herbie Hancock.

== Charts ==
=== Weekly charts ===
Weekly chart performance for Unpredictable
Chart (2005–2006)	Peak position
Australian Albums (ARIA)	39
Belgian Albums (Ultratop Flanders)	70
Dutch Albums (Album Top 100)	47
French Albums (SNEP)	55
German Albums (Offizielle Top 100)	43
Irish Albums (IRMA)	27
New Zealand Albums (RMNZ)	13
Scottish Albums (Official Charts)	23
Swiss Albums (Schweizer Hitparade)	66
UK Albums (Official Charts)	9
US Billboard 200	1
US Top R&B/Hip-Hop Albums (Billboard)	1

=== Year-end charts ===
Year-end chart performance for Unpredictable
Chart (2006)	Position
Australian Urban Albums (ARIA)	43
US Billboard 200	15
US Top R&B/Hip-Hop Albums (Billboard)	2

== Certifications ==
Certifications for Unpredictable
Region	Certification	Certified units/sales
Canada (Music Canada)	Gold	50,000^{^}
United Kingdom (BPI)	Silver	60,000^{^}
United States (RIAA)	2× Platinum	2,000,000^{^}
^{^} Shipments figures based on certification alone.
