= The Foxxhole =

- Broadcast area: United States, Canada
- Frequency: Sirius XM Radio 96
- Branding: xL The Foxxhole

Programming
- Format: Uncensored Urban comedy, talk radio, urban contemporary with Jamie Foxx

Ownership
- Owner: Sirius XM Radio

History
- First air date: May 17, 2007

Technical information
- Class: Satellite Radio Station

The Foxxhole was an uncensored comedy channel on Sirius XM Radio channel 96. Presented by actor/comedian/musician Jamie Foxx, the network broadcasts a variety of comedy and urban music such as hip-hop and R&B in addition to live talk shows broadcast during the weekdays. The channel originally debuted on Sirius 106 on May 17, 2007, and began broadcasting simultaneously on XM 149 on November 12, 2008, until both services moved The Foxxhole to channel 96 on May 4, 2011.

Original programming on The Foxxhole includes talk shows such as The Jamie Foxx Show and Speedy's Comedy Corner; former programs on the network have included The Claudia Jordan Show, The Corey Holcomb 5150 Show, The B. Scott Show, and other programs.

Between programs, The Foxxhole broadcasts a nonstop stream of unedited and uncensored stand-up comedy clips from urban comedians, as well as urban contemporary, hip-hop and R&B songs.

== Controversies ==
On the April 17, 2009 episode of The Jamie Foxx Show, Foxx and his co-hosts made several sexually suggestive and disparaging jokes regarding teenaged singer Miley Cyrus, in response to a caller's comment on a recent altercation between Cyrus and rock band Radiohead. Cyrus, who was a minor at the time, was advised by Foxx and his co-hosts to "go make a sex tape" and take drugs "like Lindsay Lohan". Foxx issued a public apology on The Tonight Show with Jay Leno several days later in response to growing public outcry as well as televised criticism by Cyrus's father, country singer Billy Ray Cyrus.

== See also ==
- List of Sirius Satellite Radio stations
- List of XM Satellite Radio channels
