= Best Night of My Life =

Studio album by Jamie Foxx
- Released: December 21, 2010
- Recorded: 2009–2010
- Genres: R&B; hip hop
- Length: 55:07
- Labels: Jamie Breyon; J
- Producers: The Y's; Bink; Tony "Chef Tone" Scales; Danja; Rico Love; Noah "40" Shebib; Malay; KP; Eric Hudson; Mel & Mus; Big Bob; Juke; Jamie Foxx

Jamie Foxx chronology
Intuition (2008)	Best Night of My Life (2010)	Hollywood: A Story of a Dozen Roses (2015)

Singles from Best Night of My Life
- 1. "Winner" Released: April 6, 2010; 2. "Living Better Now" Released: November 2, 2010; 3. "Fall for Your Type" Released: November 12, 2010; 4. "Best Night of My Life" Released: April 5, 2011

Best Night of My Life is the fourth studio album by American singer and actor Jamie Foxx. It was released on December 21, 2010, by Jamie Breyon Entertainment and J Records. The album was supported by four singles in total; "Winner" featuring Justin Timberlake and T.I., "Living Better Now" featuring Rick Ross, "Fall for Your Type" featuring Drake and "Best Night of My Life" featuring Wiz Khalifa.

Upon its release, Best Night of My Life was met with generally mixed reviews from music critics. The album debuted at number six on the US Billboard 200 chart, selling 144,000 copies in its first week.

== Background ==
The album was originally scheduled to be released under the title Body.

== Promotion ==
On November 16, 2009, the song titled "Speak French" featuring Gucci Mane, was released as the buzz single.

== Singles ==
"Winner" featuring Justin Timberlake and T.I., was released as the album's lead single on April 6, 2010.

The album's second single "Living Better Now" featuring Rick Ross was released as a digital download on November 2, 2010. It officially impacted Rhythmic and Urban radio in the US on November 9, 2010.

"Fall For Your Type" featuring Drake, was released as the album third single on November 12, 2010.

"Best Night of My Life" featuring Wiz Khalifa, was released as the album's fourth single on April 5, 2011.

=== Promotional singles ===
"Yep Dat's Me" featuring Ludacris and Soulja Boy, was released as the album's first promotional single on December 17, 2010. Another version of the song, which features T.I. was released as well.

== Critical reception ==
Professional ratings
Aggregate scores
Source	Rating
Metacritic	58/100
Review scores
Source	Rating
Allmusic	3/5 stars
The Boston Globe	mixed
Entertainment Weekly	B−
HipHopDX	3.5/5 stars
Los Angeles Times	2.5/4 stars
The New York Times	(favorable)
PopMatters	(2/10)
Rolling Stone	3/5 stars
Slant Magazine	2.5/5 stars
USA Today	2.5/4 stars

Best Night of My Life was met with generally mixed reviews from music critics. At Metacritic, which assigns a normalized rating out of 100 to reviews from mainstream critics, the album received an average score of 58, which indicates "mixed or average reviews", based on 9 reviews. In a mixed review, David Jeffries of Allmusic wrote that, "If Best Night of My Life is just part of the bigger Foxx picture, rather than an item from his sideline career, it’s still an above-average celebrity album".

== Commercial performance ==
Best Night of My Life debuted at number six on the US Billboard 200 chart, selling 144,000 copies in its first week. This became Foxx's third consecutive US top-ten album. As of January 2015, the album has sold 409,000 copies in the United States.

== Track listing ==
No.	Title	Writer(s)	Producer(s)	Length
1.	"This Will Be (Intro)"	Chuck Jackson, Marvin Yancy		1:41
2.	"Best Night of My Life" (featuring Wiz Khalifa)	Eric Hudson, Eric Bishop, Breyon Prescott, Tony Scales, Cameron Thomaz	Hudson	3:05
3.	"Living Better Now" (featuring Rick Ross)	Bink, Ernie Isley, Marvin Isley, O'Kelly Isley, Ronald Isley, Rudolph Isley, Christopher Jasper, Rico Love, Prescott, William Roberts II, Bishop, Tony "Chef Tone" Scales	Bink	4:06
4.	"Winner" (featuring Justin Timberlake and T.I.)	James Fauntleroy II, Justin Timberlake, Robert Knox, Clifford Harris, Jr.	The Y's	4:02
5.	"Freak" (featuring Rico Love)	Danja, Love, Marcella Araica	Danja	4:34
6.	"Hit It Like This"	Melvin Hough II, Prescott, Rivelino Raoul Wouter	Mel & Mus	2:48
7.	"Yep Dat's Me" (featuring Ludacris and Soulja Boy)	Hudson, Bishop, Lonny Bereal, Michael Dion, Christopher Bridges, James Smith	Hudson, Ezekiel Lewis*	3:07
8.	"Fall for Your Type" (featuring Drake)	Noah "40" Shebib, Noel Campbell, Aubrey Graham	Noah "40" Shebib, Drake (co.)	4:30
9.	"Gorgeous"	Hudson, Bishop	Hudson	5:03
10.	"Let Me Get You on Your Toes (Interlude)"	Hudson, Bishop, Bereal, Smith	Hudson	1:31
11.	"15 Minutes"	James Ho, Kawan "KP" Prather, Terrence Smith, Ashanti Floyd	Malay, KP	4:06
12.	"Sleeping Pill"	Bishop, Ainz Brainz Prasad, Al Sherrod Lambert	Jamie Foxx & Ainz Brainz Prasad	4:05
13.	"Rejoice"	Big Bob, Juke, Raheem DeVaughn, Bishop, Chris Lewis, Prescott	Big Bob, Juke	4:48
14.	"All Said and Done"	Hudson, Bishop, Bereal, Lambert, Smith	Hudson	4:31
15.	"Sex on the Beach" (featuring Shelly Renee)	Bishop, Butler, Ainz Brainz Prasad, Lamis Carneiro	Jamie Foxx & Ainz Brainz Prasad	3:16

Deluxe edition (bonus tracks)
No.	Title	Writer(s)	Producer(s)	Length
15.	"Split Personality"	Fauntleroy, Timberlake, Knox	The Y's	4:50
16.	"Quit Your Job"		Los da Mystro	3:17
17.	"Speak French" (featuring Gucci Mane)	Bishop, Radric Davis, Tyler Williams	Sean Garrett, Bangladesh	4:53
18.	"Sex on the Beach" (featuring Shelly Renee)	Bishop, Butler, Prasad, Carneiro	Jamie Foxx	3:16

Notes

- "Yep Dat's Me" has an alternate version featuring rapper T.I. instead of Ludacris

Sample credits

- "This Will Be (Intro)" contains interpolations of "This Will Be", performed by Natalie Cole
- "Living Better Now" contains an interpolation of "Big Poppa" performed by The Notorious B.I.G.

== Charts ==
=== Weekly charts ===
Weekly chart performance for Best Night of My Life
Chart (2010)	Peak position
US Billboard 200	6
US Top R&B/Hip-Hop Albums (Billboard)	2

=== Year-end charts ===
Year-end chart performance for Best Night of My Life
Chart (2011)	Position
US Billboard 200	81
US Top R&B/Hip-Hop Albums (Billboard)	21

== Release history ==
Best Night of My Life release history
Region	Date	Label	Ref(s)
United Kingdom	December 20, 2010	RCA Records	
United States	December 21, 2010	J Records	
