= Hollywood: A Story of a Dozen Roses =

Studio album by Jamie Foxx
- Released: May 15, 2015
- Recorded: 2014–15
- Genre: R&B
- Length: 49:57
- Labels: Jamie Breyon; RCA
- Producers: DJ Mustard; Jamie Foxx; The Monarch; Pharrell Williams; Kevin Cossom; Cook Classics; Boi-1da; Vinylz; Mario Winans; J-Rell; Vidal Davis; Lonny Bereal; Catalyst; Frank Dukes; Tank; Allen Ritter; Syk Sense; Travis Sayles; Breyon Prescott; Christopher Young; Brainz; J-Doe; Don City

Jamie Foxx chronology
Best Night of My Life (2010)	Hollywood: A Story of a Dozen Roses (2015)

Singles from Hollywood: A Story of a Dozen Roses
- 1. "Ain't My Fault" Released: November 25, 2014; 2. "You Changed Me" Released: March 12, 2015; 3. "Baby's In Love" Released: May 4, 2015; 4. "In Love By Now" Released: August 26, 2015

Hollywood: A Story of a Dozen Roses (also commonly known as Hollywood) is the fifth studio album by American R&B singer and actor Jamie Foxx. It was released on May 15, 2015, by Jamie Breyon Entertainment and RCA Records. The album includes musical appearances from Chris Brown, Fabolous, Kid Ink, Pharrell Williams and Wale, while production on the album was handled by Boi-1da, DJ Mustard, Mario Winans and Vinylz, among others.

The album debuted at number ten on the US Billboard 200 chart, selling 31,000 copies in its first week.

== Background and concept ==
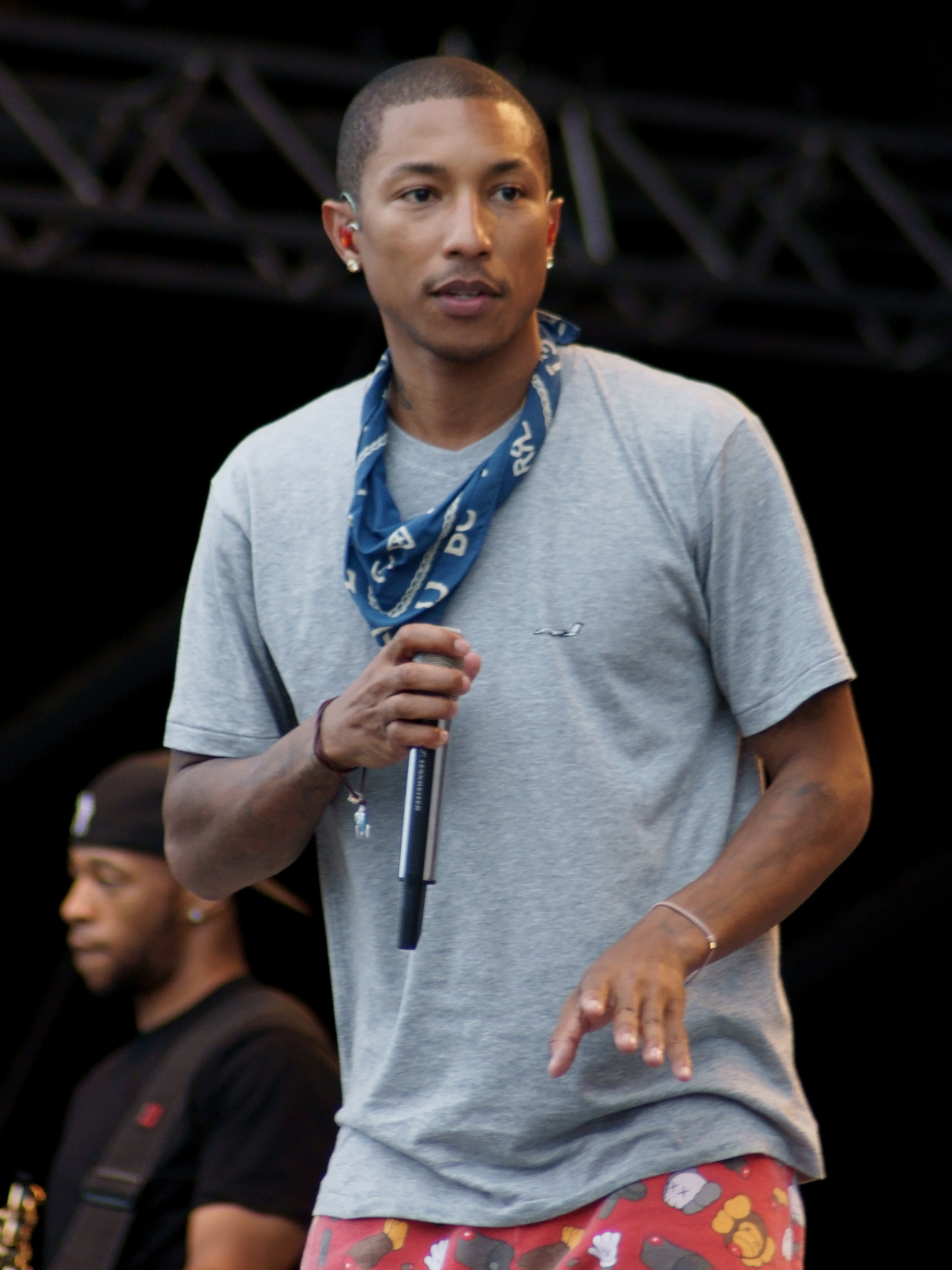
Foxx collaborated with fellow singer Pharrell (pictured) on the song "Tease".

Hollywood: A Story of a Dozen Roses as Foxx describes the album, as a focus on a former relationship, he had in Hollywood, California, where his girlfriend abandons him in his time of need. stating:

This what you learn about Hollywood sometimes the person is not all into you as maybe as like a step up as to whatever next person is. So I find this out in a weird way, I was suppose [sic] to go to a premier, I've gotta 104 temperature, so i'm laying in the bed & the girl that I was dating at the time saids um what you doing, I said what you mean, well ugh it's the premier, it's the biggest premier, yeah i'm sick, well ugh I got this dressed & I was like Word, said yes & people are there & people going to be on red carpet for me & i'm gone see me & i'm gonna be me there. So I get up go to the closet & grab the dress & said go head, but don't come back & that was something that like tripped me out like you really need that shine like crazy & I said okay cool & I seen her float on to somebody else in Hollywood.

== Singles ==
The album's lead single, titled "Ain't My Fault", was released on November 25, 2014. The song was written and produced by Mario Winans.

The album's second single, "You Changed Me" featuring Chris Brown, was released on March 12, 2015. The production on the song was handled by Boi-1da, Vinylz, Allen Ritter, Kevin Cossom and Jordan Evans. The song has so far peaked at number 93 on the US Billboard Hot 100.

The album's third single, "Baby's In Love" featuring Kid Ink, was released on May 4, 2015. The production on the song was handled by Cook Classics.

Foxx announced "In Love By Now" as the album's fourth single August 26, 2015.

=== Promotional singles ===
"Party Ain't a Party" featuring 2 Chainz, was released on October 7, 2014. and features production from DJ Mustard. When he saw the fight of Pusha T & Consequence, he told the two to stop fighting and sued Consequence for putting Pusha T in a headlock.

"Pretty Thing" (originally titled "Pretty Young Thing") premiered on March 11, 2015, was produced by DJ Mustard, and sampled Michael Jackson's hit single "P.Y.T. (Pretty Young Thing)".

== Critical reception ==
Professional ratings
Aggregate scores
Source	Rating
Metacritic	53/100
Review scores
Source	Rating
AllMusic	2/5 stars
Billboard	3/5 stars
Consequence of Sound	C+
The New York Times	mixed
Rolling Stone	3/5 stars

Hollywood: A Story of a Dozen Roses received generally mixed reviews from music critics. At Metacritic, which assigns a normalized rating out of 100, to reviews from mainstream publications, the album received an average score of 53 based on 5 reviews, signifying "mixed or average reviews". Hillary Crosley of Billboard described the album as a "disjointed outing", saying that "It sounds like a collection of random one-offs rather than an album. Foxx's voice, falsetto and all, still sounds lovely, but he seems unsure exactly how he should use it." Andy Kellman of AllMusic was critical of the album, saying "That material, as well as much of what surrounds it, is significantly less substantive than the singer's past work" stating that the single "You Changed Me" is "the only adult cut off the album".

== Commercial performance ==
Hollywood: A Story of a Dozen Roses debuted at number ten on the US Billboard 200 chart, selling 31,000 copies in its first week. This became Foxx's fourth consecutive US top-ten album. The album debuted at number one on the US Top R&B/Hip-Hop Albums, scoring Foxx's third chart-topper and first since 2009. In its second week, the album dropped to number 32 on the chart, selling an additional 11,000 copies, bringing its two-week total to 42,000 copies.

== Track listing ==
Hollywood — Standard version
No.	Title	Writer(s)	Producer(s)	Length
1.	"Dozen Roses, Pt. 1"	Jamie Foxx; Ainz Brainz Prasad; Don City; Ricky Offord	Don City; Ainz Brainz Prasad	1:14
2.	"You Changed Me" (featuring Chris Brown)	Kevin Cossom; Chris Brown	Boi-1da; Vinylz; Ritter; Cossom; Evans	4:02
3.	"Like a Drum" (featuring Wale)	Samuels; Joshua Scruggs; Jamie Foxx; Cossom; Prescott; Olubowale Akintimehin	Boi-1da; Syk Sense; Cossom	5:56
4.	"Another Dose"	Samuels; Hernandez; Adam Feeney; Foxx; Kevin Cossom; Prescott	Boi-1da; Frank Dukes; Cossom	3:54
5.	"Tease" (featuring Pharrell)	Pharrell Williams	Williams	2:55
6.	"Baby's in Love" (featuring Kid Ink)	Will Lobban-Bean; Jacob Luttrell; Lauren Christy; Shy Carter; Brian Collins	Cook Classics	3:29
7.	"Text Message"	Vidal Davis; Theron Thomas; Timothy Thomas; Foxx; Prescott	Davis	4:06
8.	"Hollywood"	Jerell Moore; Richard Wheeler; Tobias Thomas; Foxx; Prescott; Dan Farrugia; Michael McIntosh	J'rell of The Inkkwell	4:04
9.	"Vegas Confessions"	Moore; Wheeler; Thomas; Foxx; Prescott; McIntosh	J'rell of The Inkkwell	3:44
10.	"Socialite"	Andre Davidson; Sean Davidson; Cossom; Foxx; Prescott	The Monarch; Cossom	4:02
11.	"Dozen Roses, Pt. 2"	Jamie Foxx; Ainz Brainz Prasad; Don City; Offord	Don City; Ainz Brainz Prasad	0:50
12.	"In Love By Now"	Foxx; Lonny Bereal; Mitch Cohn; Travis Sayles; James Smith; Durrell Babbs	Catalyst; Sayles; J Doe; Tank; Foxx	3:05
13.	"Jumping Out the Window"	Foxx; L. Bereal; Cohn; Sayles; Smith; Farrugia; Babbs	Cohn; Sayles; L. Bereal	4:15
14.	"On the Dot" (featuring Fabolous)	Hernandez; Samuels; Cossom; Foxx; Ritter; Ken Lewis; Brent Kolatalo; Prescott; John Jackson	Vinylz; Boi-1da; Cossom; Ritter; Kataylst	3:12
15.	"Dozen Roses, Pt. 3"	Jamie Foxx; Ainz Brainz Prasad; Don City; Offord	Don City; Ainz Brainz Prasad	1:12
Total length:				49:57

Hollywood — Deluxe version (bonus tracks)
No.	Title	Writer(s)	Producer(s)	Length
16.	"Right Now"	Prescott; Curtis Chambers; Ivan Barias; Foxx; Miguel Jontel Pimentel	Orthodox	3:16
17.	"Pretty Thing"	Mikely Wilhelm Adam; Dijon Isaiah McFarlane; James Ingram; Quincy Jones	DJ Mustard	2:24
18.	"Ain't My Fault"	Foxx	Mario Winans	3:36
Total length:				59:11

== Charts ==
=== Weekly charts ===
Chart (2015)	Peak position
UK R&B Albums (Official Charts)	37
US Billboard 200	10
US Top R&B/Hip-Hop Albums (Billboard)	1

=== Year-end charts ===
Chart (2015)	Position
US Top R&B/Hip-Hop Albums (Billboard)	51

== Release history ==
List of release dates, showing region, formats, label, editions and reference
Region	Date	Format(s)	Label	Edition(s)	Ref.
Germany	May 15, 2015	CD; digital download	JB Venture; RCA	Deluxe	
United Kingdom	May 18, 2015	CD; digital download	JB Venture; RCA	Standard; Deluxe	
United States	May 18, 2015	CD; digital download	RCA	Standard; Deluxe	

== See also ==
- List of Billboard number-one R&B/Hip-Hop albums of 2015
