= Fall for Your Type =

Single by Jamie Foxx featuring Drake

from the album Best Night of My Life
- Released: November 12, 2010
- Recorded: 2010
- Studio: Westlake Studios (Hollywood, California), Hit Factory Criteria (Miami, Florida)
- Genre: Downtempo
- Length: 4:31
- Label: J
- Songwriters: Noah Shebib; Aubrey Graham; Noel Campbell
- Producers: Noah "40" Shebib; Rico Love; Drake

Jamie Foxx singles chronology
"Living Better Now" (2010)	"Fall for Your Type" (2010)

Drake singles chronology
"What's My Name?" (2010)	"Fall for Your Type" (2010)	"Moment 4 Life" (2010)

"Fall for Your Type" is a downtempo ballad, recorded by American singer and actor Jamie Foxx for his fourth studio album, Best Night of My Life (2010). The song was released as the third single from the album on November 12, 2010.

It features guest vocals from Canadian rapper Drake, who originally recorded the song for his debut studio album, Thank Me Later (2010). The song was written by Noah "40" Shebib, Aubrey "Drake" Graham and Noel Campbell. "Fall for Your Type" was produced by Shebib, with vocal production by Rico Love.

== Background ==
Drake recorded "Fall for Your Type" for his debut studio album Thank Me Later (2010). He told MTV News in August 2010 that he wished that the song was included on the album, but revealed that: "I have other plans for that record, so it's gonna be good".

== Music and lyrics ==
"Fall for Your Type" is a downtempo ballad, with a length of four minutes and thirty-one seconds (4:31). August Brown cited the song as being a "lovers' rock for a techno dystopia". The song contains an "icy cold", hip hop landscape. "Fall for Your Type" is a "somber track", in which Foxx "drops into a pained purr and gives guest Drake a run for his melancholy-player money."

== Critical response ==
In a review of the album, Jonah Weiner of Rolling Stone notes "Fall for Your Type" as being the album's "one break from the good times". He cited it as being refreshing to hear Foxx "finally switch up his script".

== Live performances ==
Foxx and Drake performed the song on December 13, 2010 on The Ellen DeGeneres Show. Foxx performed the song on Good Morning America on December 20.

== Music video ==
The music video for "Fall for Your Type" was directed by Chris Robinson. It begins with Foxx and Drake's names appearing on screen with a cloudy dark sky backdrop, and as the music starts the names disappear and the words "fall for your type" shatter as Foxx is falling from a building in a suit. Foxx, in the next scene, is in his penthouse, wearing shades, thinking about his love interest and the moments they had together. Especially one where he is with her, watching her sleep. Shots of him falling from a building appear throughout the video. In another scene his love interest is seen, supposedly angry and they are yelling at each other, and she eventually pushes him, and he falls back because he would have slipped on her purse.

As Drake appears in a dark backdrop, Foxx is seen in the left back, falling with shattered glass in mid-air. The next scenes involve furniture such as vases and lamps being thrown to the ground in slow motion, and Foxx's love interest (Jessica Burciaga) throwing a couple of wine glasses and a painting to the ground. Foxx is seen sitting on a couch, facing broken glass in his penthouse, his tattoo being shown. More scenes display the two, Foxx and his love interest being intimate, switching to him walking through the mess of the shattered glass. Drake is introduced talking to his love interest close, in her ear, who seems at first to have her back turned to him. Foxx and his companion are seen at a gathering, flirting. Then in the next scene they are fighting over the phone to the extent that she drops her phone in a glass of champagne. At the end of the video, Foxx hears a doorbell and goes to get it. It is his love interest; she mouths the words "I love you," and he lets her in.

== Charts ==
=== Weekly charts ===
Chart (2010–2011)	Peak position
US Billboard Hot 100	50
US Hot R&B/Hip-Hop Songs (Billboard)	1
US Rhythmic Airplay (Billboard)	23

=== Year-end charts ===
Chart (2011)	Position
US Hot R&B/Hip-Hop Songs (Billboard)	16

== See also ==
- List of number-one R&B singles of 2011 (U.S.)
