= Peep This =

Studio album by Jamie Foxx
- Released: July 19, 1994
- Length: 55:28
- Label: Fox
- Producer: Jamie Foxx (also exec.); DaMone Arnold; Victor White

Jamie Foxx chronology
Peep This (1994)	Unpredictable (2005)

Singles from Peep This
- 1. "Infatuation" Released: May 16, 1994; 2. "Experiment" Released: September 5, 1994

Peep This is the debut studio album by American entertainer Jamie Foxx, then of In Living Color fame. It was released on July 19, 1994, by Fox Records. The album peaked at number 78 on the US Billboard 200 and produced two singles, including "Infatuation" and "Experiment." Foxx's next album, Unpredictable, was released in 2005.

== Critical reception ==
Professional ratings
Review scores
Source	Rating
AllMusic	2.5/5 stars

AllMusic rated the album two and a half out of five stars.

== Track listing ==
All tracks written or co-written by Jamie Foxx; additional writers noted where applicable.

No.	Title	Writer(s)	Length
1.	"Peep This"		2:50
2.	"Experiment"		4:44
3.	"Miss You"		4:20
4.	"Dog House" (featuring The Poetess)	Felicia Morris	4:57
5.	"Infatuation"		5:01
6.	"Baby Don't Cry"		4:23
7.	"Precious"	Victor White	4:02
8.	"Your Love"		4:50
9.	"Summertime"	Victor White	4:49
10.	"If You Love Me"		4:15
11.	"Don't Let the Sun (Go Down on Our Love)"		5:25
12.	"Peep This Out"		0:27
13.	"Light a Candle"		5:05

Sample credits

- "Miss You" contains samples from "I Need a Freak" as performed by Sexual Harassment and "Beatbox (Diversion One)" as performed by Art of Noise
- "Your Love" contains a sample from "If I Was Your Girlfriend" as written and performed by Prince.

== Personnel ==
- Jamie Foxx – lead vocals, background vocals (2–11, 13), piano (11, 13), producer, arrangements, executive producer, musician
- DaMóne Arnold – co-producer, musician
- Chopper – assistant engineer
- Kevin "K.D." Davis – engineer, mixing
- Emáge – background vocals (4, 7, 10)
- Eric Flicksinger – assistant engineer
- Kenny Ford, Sr. – piano (13), arrangement (13)
- Kenny Ford, Jr. – bass (13)
- Sheree Ford-Payne – background vocals (7)
- Wendell Greene – executive producer
- Helik – assistant engineer
- Marcus King – executive producer
- Stephen Marcussen – mastering
- Keith Martin – background vocals (3)
- Jeremy Monroe – background vocals (2)
- Kenji Nakai – assistant engineer
- Anastacia Newkirk – background vocals (2)
- The Poetess – rap (4)
- Stoker – engineer
- Jeffrey Suttles – drums (13)
- Louie Teran – assistant engineer
- Nathan Walton – background vocals (2–4)
- Carlos Warlick – assistant engineer
- Victor White – background vocals (9), guitar (9), co-producer, musician

== Charts ==
Weekly chart performance for Peep This
Chart (1994)	Peak position
US Billboard 200	78
US Top R&B/Hip-Hop Albums (Billboard)	12
