= Winner (Jamie Foxx song) =

Single by Jamie Foxx featuring Justin Timberlake and T.I.

from the album Best Night of My Life
- Released: April 6, 2010 (digital download); April 20, 2010 (US – urban radio); May 4, 2010 (US – rhythm/crossover radio)
- Recorded: 2009
- Genre: R&B; hip hop
- Length: 4:04
- Label: J
- Songwriters: Justin Timberlake; James Fauntleroy; Rob Knox; Clifford Harris
- Producer: The Y's

Jamie Foxx singles chronology
| "Speak French" (2010) | "Winner" (2010) | "Living Better Now" (2010) |

Justin Timberlake singles chronology
| "Love Dealer" (2010) | "Winner" (2010) | "Motherlover" (2011) |

T.I. singles chronology
| "Hello Good Morning" (2010) | "Winner" (2010) | "Yeah Ya Know (Takers)" (2010) |

"Winner" is the first single from American singer and actor Jamie Foxx's fourth studio album Best Night of My Life, released for digital download on April 6, 2010, through J Records. It features American singer Justin Timberlake and rapper T.I. Foxx told George Lopez about Timberlake's contribution: "I got him on the track—'cause he wasn't gonna get on the track—I just literally said, 'Man, my people suffered for 500 years. You owe me this.'"

== Critical reception ==
AllMusic considered this song a standout cut. LA Times was also positive: "Current radio staple "Winner" sets the template — big processed drums, creepy synths and lots of open space for Foxx's capable runs." The New York Times was positive too: "On "Winner" there's even some of the pseudo rapping that Justin Timberlake has been squeezing out of his system of late." PopMatters was negative in its review, however: ""Winner" is another song that exists in spite of Jamie, and speaks only to the depth of his pockets. (...) The chorus of "Winner" splayed across ESPN and TNT promos for basketball games." Slant Magazine panned the track: "It's this kind of careless maximalism that produces junk like "Winner", a whirring waste of a Justin Timberlake appearance, a song whose basketball theme and cheesy dribble beat sound like something ripped from High School Musical." USA Today, however, highlighted the song positively.

== Charts ==
Chart performance
| Chart (2010) | Peak position |
|---|---|
| Canada Hot 100 (Billboard) | 23 |
| New Zealand (Recorded Music NZ) | 37 |
| US Billboard Hot 100 | 28 |
| US Pop Airplay (Billboard) | 30 |
| US Hot R&B/Hip-Hop Songs (Billboard) | 65 |
