= Unpredictable (Jamie Foxx song) =

Single by Jamie Foxx featuring Ludacris

from the album Unpredictable
- Released: October 18, 2005
- Length: 3:39
- Label: J
- Songwriters: Derrick Baker; Christopher Bridges; Harold Lilly; James Scheffer
- Producers: Jim Jonsin; Bigg D; Lilly

Jamie Foxx singles chronology
"Georgia" (2005)	"Unpredictable" (2005)	"DJ Play a Love Song" (2006)

Ludacris singles chronology
"Georgia" (2005)	"Unpredictable" (2005)	"Money Maker" (2006)

"Unpredictable" is a song by American singer and actor Jamie Foxx. It was written by Derrick "Bigg D" Baker, Christopher Bridges, Harold Lilly, and Jim Jonsin for his same-titled second studio album (2005), while production was helmed by Baker, Lilly, and Jonsin. It was released as the album's second single in 2005. It features additional vocals by rapper Ludacris. "Unpredictable" samples "Wild Flower" and "Wild Flower (Suite)" by American funk and R&B group New Birth. A commercial success, it peaked number eight on the US Billboard Hot 100.

== Chart performance ==
"Unpredictable" debuted at number 100 on the US Billboard Hot 100 chart, on the week of May 6, 2006. After climbing for the chart for 11 weeks, the song eventually reached its peak at number eight on the chart, the week of February 11, 2006. This became Foxx's first US top-ten single as a lead artist. The song also peaked at number two on the US Hot R&B/Hip-Hop Songs chart in February 2006. On June 14, 2006, the single was certified platinum by the Recording Industry Association of America (RIAA) for sales of over a million copies in the United States.

In the United Kingdom, the single peaked at number 16 on the UK Singles Chart on April 16, 2006. This became Foxx's highest charting song in UK as a lead artist.

== Track listing ==
UK CD

1. "Unpredictable" (album version) – 3:39
2. "Unpredictable" (The Roger Athelston mix) – 3:40
3. "Unpredictable" (Mayhem Reggae mix) – 4:18
4. "Unpredictable" (CD-ROM video)

US 12"

A-side:

- A1. "Unpredictable" (Mayhem Reggae mix) – 4:17
- A2. "Unpredictable" (Mayhem instrumental) – 4:17

B-side:

- B1. "Unpredictable" (The Roger Athelston mix) – 3:41
- B2. "Unpredictable" (The Roger Athelston instrumental) – 3:41
- B3. "Unpredictable" (radio edit; main) – 3:39

== Charts ==
=== Weekly charts ===
Weekly chart performance for "Unpredictable"
Chart (2006)	Peak position
Australia (ARIA)	22
Belgium (Ultratip Bubbling Under Flanders)	5
Belgium (Ultratip Bubbling Under Wallonia)	4
France (SNEP)	91
Netherlands (Dutch Top 40 Tipparade)	6
Netherlands (Single Top 100)	43
Germany (GfK)	73
Ireland (IRMA)	26
New Zealand (Recorded Music NZ)	13
Scotland Singles (OCC)	26
Switzerland (Schweizer Hitparade)	85
UK Singles (OCC)	16
UK Hip Hop/R&B (OCC)	6
US Billboard Hot 100	8
US Hot R&B/Hip-Hop Songs (Billboard)	2
US Pop Airplay (Billboard)	27
US Rhythmic Airplay (Billboard)	6

=== Year-end charts ===
Year-end chart performance for "Unpredictable"
Chart (2006)	Position
UK Urban (Music Week)	4
US Billboard Hot 100	60
US Hot R&B/Hip-Hop Songs (Billboard)	2
US Rhythmic (Billboard)	36

== Certifications ==
Certifications for "Unpredictable"
Region	Certification	Certified units/sales
New Zealand (RMNZ)	Gold	15,000^{‡}
United States (RIAA)	Platinum	1,000,000^{^}
^{^} Shipments figures based on certification alone.^{‡} Sales+streaming figures based on certification alone.

== Release history ==
Release dates and formats for "Unpredictable"
Region	Date	Format	Label(s)	Ref.
United States	24 January 2006	Mainstream airplay	J	
