= Jamie Foxx =

American comedian, actor and singer (born 1967)

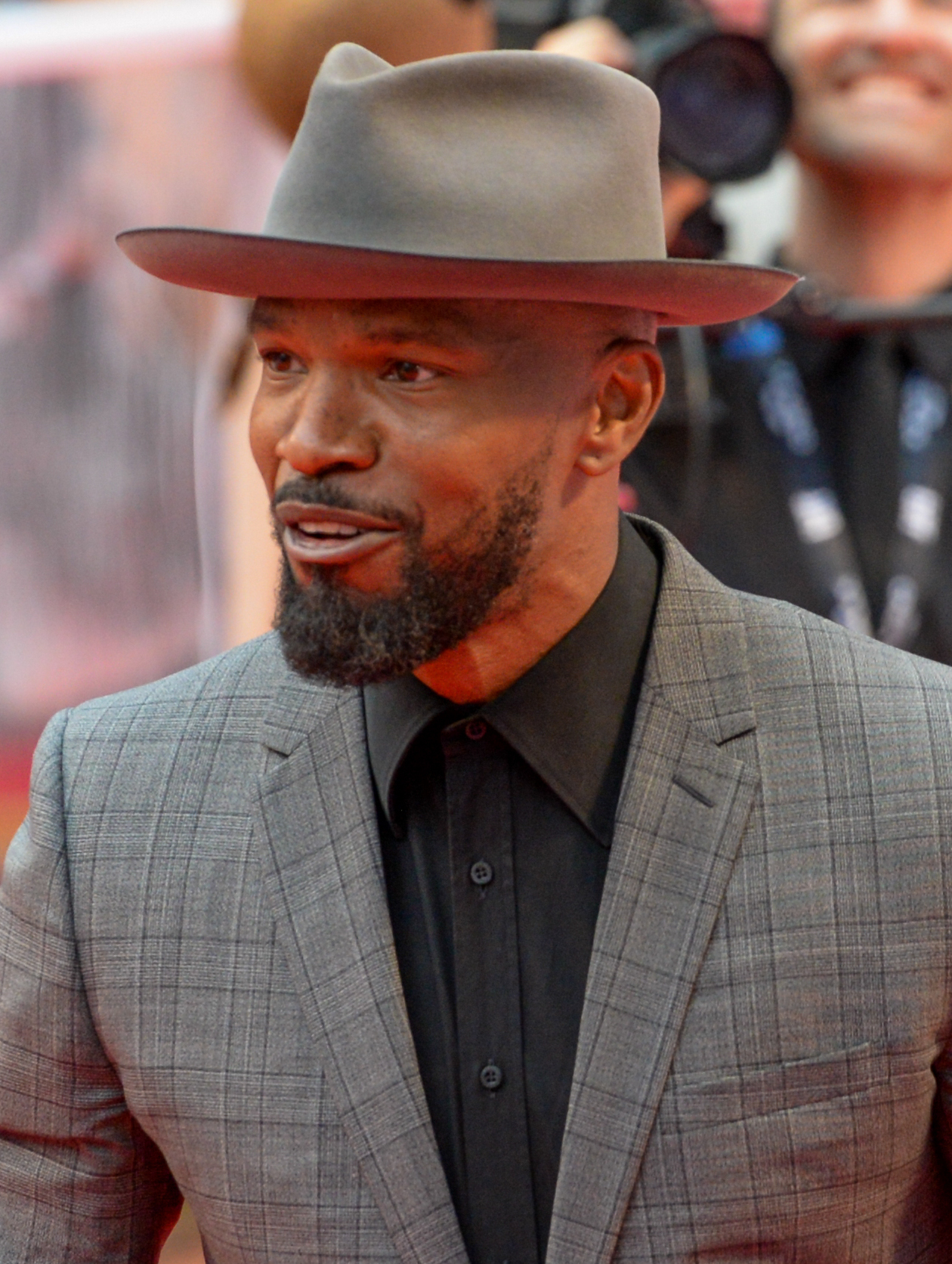
- Foxx at the 2019 Toronto International Film Festival
- Born: Eric Marlon Bishop; December 13, 1967 (age 58); Terrell, Texas, U.S.
- Education: United States International University (BA)
- Occupations: Actor; comedian; singer; producer; pianist
- Years active: 1988–present
- Works: Filmography; discography
- Children: 2, including Corinne
- Awards: Full list
- Musical career
- Genres: R&B; hip hop; pop; comedy
- Instruments: Vocals; piano
- Labels: Fox; J; RCA; Foxxhole; Chameleon Music

Jamie Foxx (born Eric Marlon Bishop, December 13, 1967), is an American actor, comedian, singer, and film producer. He gained his career breakthrough as a featured player in the sketch comedy show In Living Color from 1991 to 1994. Following this success, he was given his own sitcom, The Jamie Foxx Show, in which he starred, co-created and produced from 1996 to 2001.

Foxx received acclaim for his portrayal of Ray Charles in the film Ray (2004), winning the Academy Award for Best Actor. That same year, he was nominated for the Academy Award for Best Supporting Actor for his role in the crime film Collateral. He gained further prominence for his film roles in Ali (2001), Jarhead (2005), Dreamgirls (2006), Miami Vice (2006), Horrible Bosses (2011), Django Unchained (2012), Annie (2014), Baby Driver (2017), and Soul (2020). He also played Electro in The Amazing Spider-Man 2 (2014) and Spider-Man: No Way Home (2021) and Walter McMillian in Just Mercy (2019).

Foxx also embarked on a successful career as an R&B singer in the 2000s. He earned two number-one singles on the Billboard Hot 100, with his features on the singles "Slow Jamz" by Twista alongside Kanye West, and "Gold Digger" by the latter. His single "Blame It" won him the Grammy Award for Best R&B Performance by a Duo or Group with Vocals. Four of his five studio albums have charted in the top ten of the U.S. Billboard 200: Unpredictable (2005), which topped the chart, Intuition (2008), Best Night of My Life (2010), and Hollywood: A Story of a Dozen Roses (2015). Since 2017, Foxx has served as the host and executive producer of the Fox game show Beat Shazam. In 2021, he wrote his autobiography Act Like You Got Some Sense.

== Early life ==
Eric Marlon Bishop was born on December 13, 1967, in Terrell, Texas, a suburb of Dallas. Foxx is the son of Darrell Bishop (renamed Shahid Abdula following his conversion to Islam), who sometimes worked as a stockbroker, and Louise Annette Talley Dixon. Shortly after his birth, Foxx was adopted and raised by his great aunt and uncle, likewise his mother's adoptive parents, Esther Marie (née Nelson), a domestic worker and nursery operator, and Mark Talley, a yard worker. He has had little contact with his birth parents, who were not a major part of his upbringing, but he has been publicly photographed with them on occasion. He was raised in the black quarter of Terrell, which at the time was a racially segregated community. He has often acknowledged his grandmother's influence as one of the greatest reasons for his success.

Foxx began playing the piano when he was five years old. He had a strict Baptist upbringing and as a teenager was a part-time pianist and choir leader in Terrell's New Hope Baptist Church. His natural talent for telling jokes was already in evidence as a third grader, when his teacher used him as a reward: if the class behaved well, Foxx would tell them jokes. He attended Terrell High School, where he received top grades and played basketball and football (as quarterback). His ambition was to play for the Dallas Cowboys, and he was the first player in the school's history to pass for more than 1,000 yards. He also sang in a band called Leather and Lace. After high school, Foxx received a scholarship to United States International University, where he studied classical piano, music theory, and composition.

== Career ==
=== 1989–2003: Standup, sitcom, and acting debut ===
In 1989, Foxx began attending a local comedy club's open mic night, after a girlfriend's dare. He found that female comedians were often called first to perform, so he chose the stage name of Jamie Foxx, which was ambiguous enough to disallow any biases, and his stage surname in deference to popular Black, 1970s comedian Redd Foxx. Foxx joined the cast of In Living Color in 1991, his recurrent character Wanda named in homage of Redd's dear friend and co-worker LaWanda Page. Following a recurring role in the comedy-drama sitcom Roc, Foxx went on to star in his own sitcom The Jamie Foxx Show, from 1996 to 2001, which he also co-created and produced through his company Foxx Hole Productions and was aired on the WB network. He portrayed Jamie King and uncredited performances of reporter Tyrone Koppel.

Foxx made his film debut in the 1992 comedy Toys. In 1994, Foxx released an album (on the Fox record label) entitled Peep This, which was not commercially successful. His first dramatic role came in Oliver Stone's 1999 film Any Given Sunday, where he was cast as a hard-partying quarterback, partly because of his own football background. During filming, Foxx stated he often butted heads with costar LL Cool J.

In 2001, Foxx starred opposite Will Smith in Michael Mann's biographical drama Ali. Three years later, Foxx played taxi driver Max Durocher in the Mann film noir Collateral alongside Tom Cruise, for which he received outstanding reviews. Critic Roger Ebert praised Foxx's performance, stating that, "Jamie Foxx's work is a revelation. I've thought of him in terms of comedy ("Booty Call", "Breakin' all the Rules"), but here he steps into a dramatic lead and is always convincing and involving". He received an Academy Award for Best Supporting Actor nomination.

=== 2003–2006: Career stardom ===
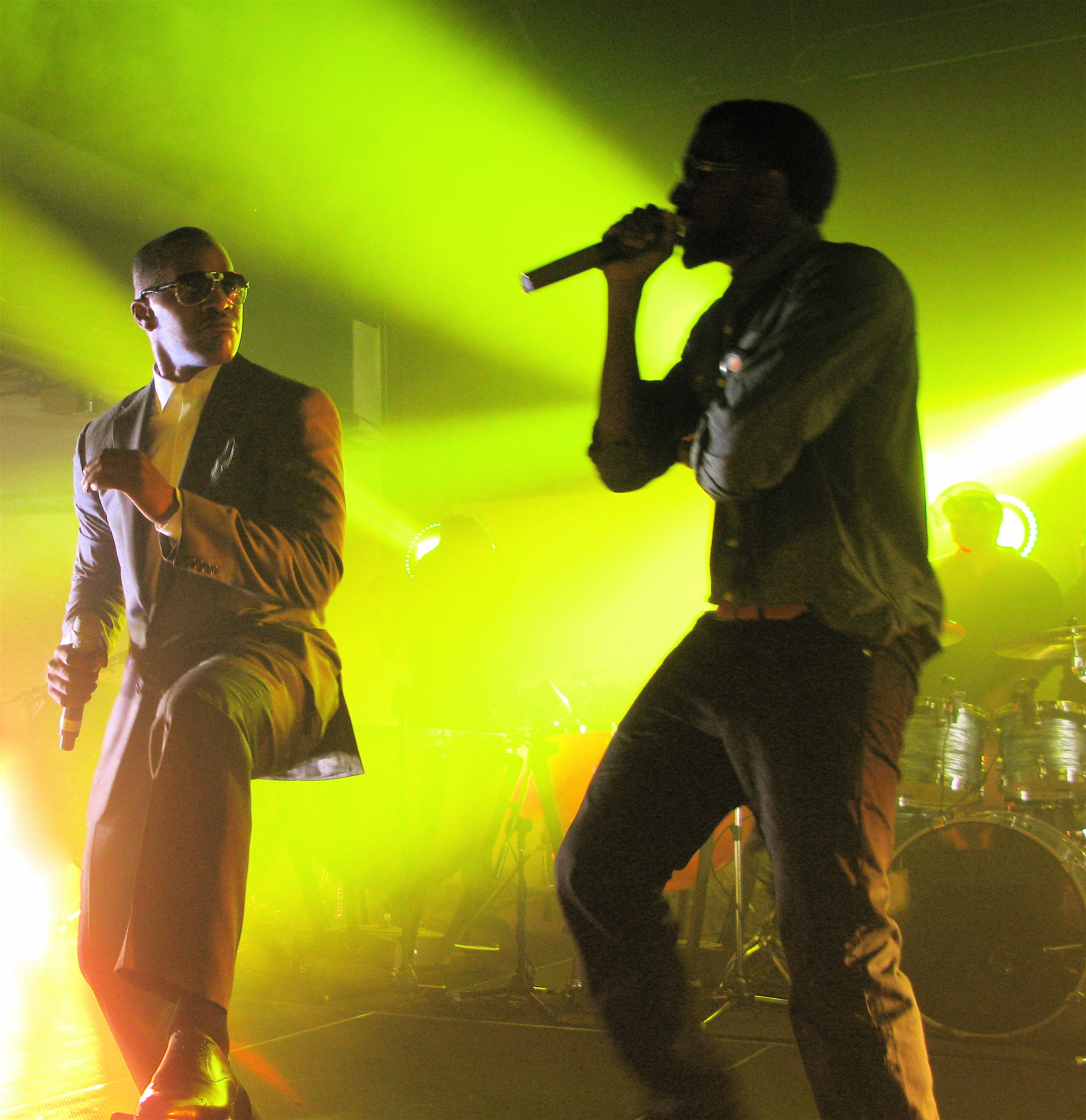
Foxx and Kanye West performing "Gold Digger"

In 2003, Foxx featured on the rapper Twista's song, "Slow Jamz", together with Kanye West, which reached No. 1 on the U.S. Billboard Hot 100 singles chart and #3 on the UK Singles chart. His second collaboration with Kanye West, "Gold Digger", in which Foxx sang the Ray Charles-influenced "I Got a Woman" hook, then went straight to No. 1 on the Billboard Hot 100, remaining there for 10 weeks. In 2005, Foxx featured on the single "Georgia" by Atlanta rappers Ludacris and Field Mob, which sampled Ray Charles' hit "Georgia on My Mind".

Foxx also portrayed Ray Charles in the biographical film Ray (2004), for which he won the Academy Award for Best Actor and the BAFTA Award for Best Actor in a Leading Role. Foxx is the third male in history (after Barry Fitzgerald and Al Pacino) to receive two acting Oscar nominations in the same year for two different movies, Collateral and Ray. In 2005, Foxx was invited to join the Academy of Motion Picture Arts and Sciences.

Foxx released his second studio album, Unpredictable, in December 2005. It debuted at No. 2, selling 598,000 copies in its first week, rising to No. 1 the following week and selling an additional 200,000 copies. To date, the album has sold 1.98 million copies in the United States, and was certified double Platinum by the RIAA. The album also charted on the UK Albums Chart, where it peaked at No. 9. Foxx became the fourth artist to have both won an Academy Award for an acting role and to have achieved a No. 1 album in the U.S., joining Frank Sinatra, Bing Crosby and Barbra Streisand.

Foxx's first single from the album, the title track "Unpredictable" (featuring Ludacris), peaked in the Billboard Hot 100 Top 10 singles and also made the UK Top 20 singles chart; the track samples "Wildflower" by New Birth. The second U.S. single from the album was "DJ Play a Love Song", which reunited Foxx with Twista. In the UK, the second single was "Extravaganza", which saw Foxx once again collaborate with Kanye West, although Foxx did not feature in the song's music video.

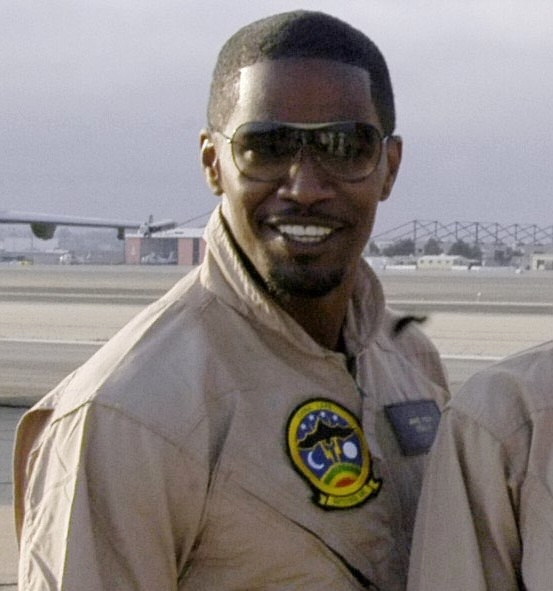
Foxx promoting Stealth in July 2005

At the 2006 BET Awards, Foxx won Best Duet/Collaboration with Kanye West for "Gold Digger" and tied with Mary J. Blige's "Be Without You" for Video of the Year. On December 8, 2006, Foxx received four Grammy Award nominations, which included Best R&B Performance by a Duo or Group with Vocals for Love Changes featuring Mary J. Blige, Best R&B Album for Unpredictable, Best Rap Performance by a Duo or Group for Georgia by Ludacris & Field Mob featuring Jamie Foxx, and Best Rap/Sung Collaboration for Unpredictable featuring Ludacris.

Following on from these successes, Foxx went on to appear in the box-office hits Jarhead, Miami Vice, and Dreamgirls, which lifted his profile even higher as a bankable star in Hollywood.

=== 2007–2009: Intuition ===
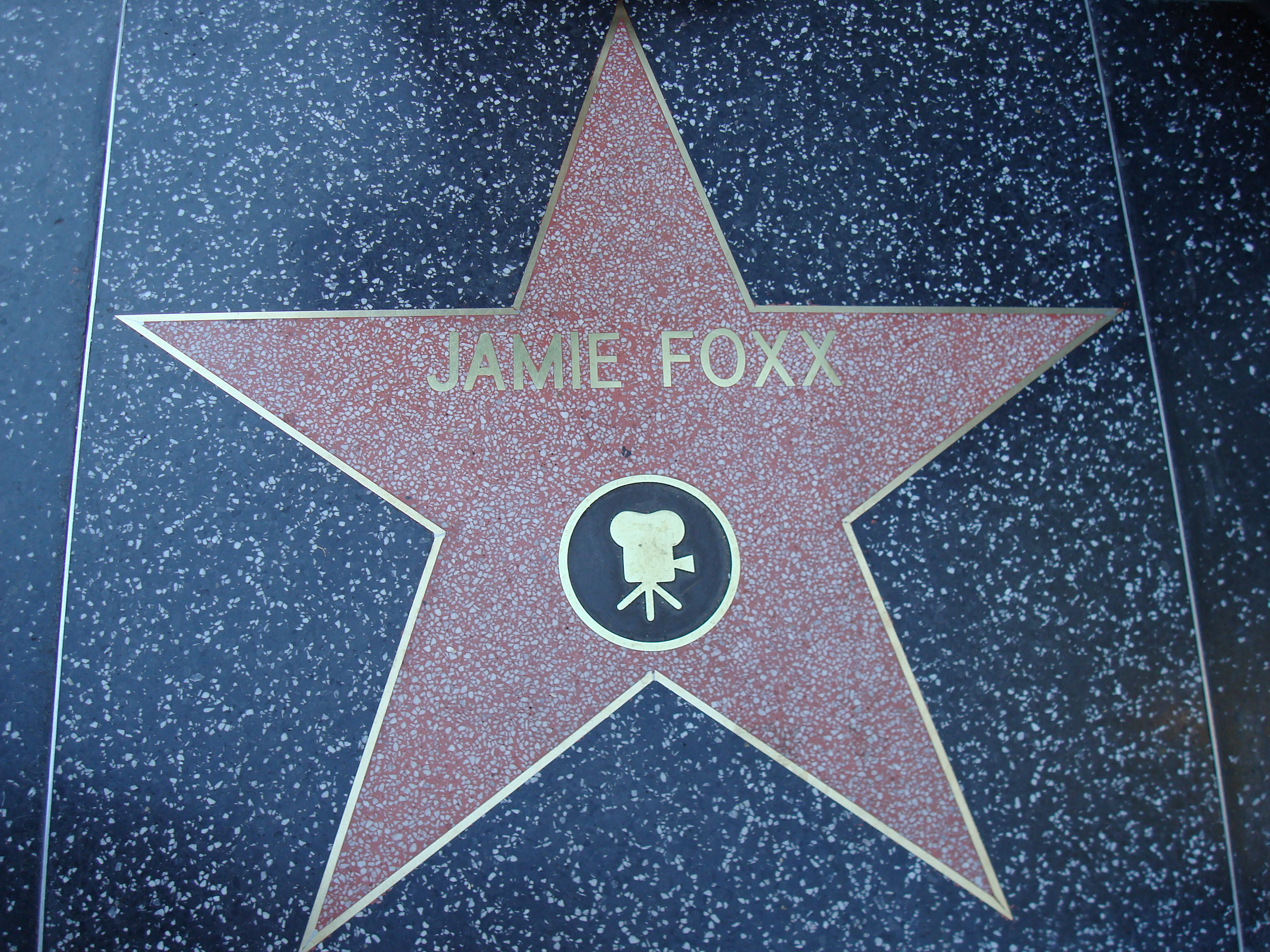
Foxx's star on the Hollywood Walk of Fame

2007 brought him the lead role in the action thriller film The Kingdom opposite Chris Cooper, Jason Bateman, Jennifer Garner and Ashraf Barhom. In September 2007, Foxx was awarded a star on the Hollywood Walk of Fame: "[it was] one of the most amazing days of my life," said Foxx. In April 2009, Foxx played the lead role in the dramatic film The Soloist. A few months later in October 2009, he played a starring role alongside Gerard Butler in the thriller Law Abiding Citizen. In 2007, his company FoxxKing Entertainment signed deals with MTV and VH1.

Foxx released his third album titled Intuition in 2008, featuring Kanye West, T.I., Ne-Yo, Lil' Kim and T-Pain. The album's first single, "Just Like Me" featuring T.I., was promoted by a video directed by Brett Ratner which featured an appearance by actress Taraji P. Henson. The second single "Blame It" featured T-Pain and became a top 5 single on the Billboard Hot 100 and a number-one single on the Billboard Hot R&B/Hip-Hop Songs chart. The song received many accolades for Foxx, including a Grammy Award for Best R&B Performance by a Duo or Group with Vocals at the 52nd Annual Grammy Awards. The "Blame It" music video, directed by Hype Williams, features cameo appearances by Forest Whitaker, Samuel L. Jackson, Ron Howard, Quincy Jones and his Jarhead co-star Jake Gyllenhaal, amongst others.

Foxx's musical career has also included a number of collaborations. In 2007, he recorded the song "She Goes All the Way" with country superstars Rascal Flatts for their Still Feels Good album. He featured alongside The-Dream on Plies' "Please Excuse My Hands". He also appeared alongside Fabolous on the remix of Ne-Yo's "Miss Independent". Foxx collaborated with rapper The Game on the track "Around the World". Foxx also featured on T.I.'s single "Live in the Sky" from the album King.

On January 22, 2007, Foxx launched The Foxxhole, a channel on Sirius Satellite Radio featuring talk-radio programs, stand-up comedy albums and music primarily by African-American performers, as well as much of Foxx's own material. Foxx's own talk-radio variety program The Jamie Foxx Show airs Friday evenings on The Foxxhole with guests including musicians, actors and fellow comedians; co-hosts have included Johnny Mack, Speedy, Claudia Jordan, The Poetess, Lewis Dix, Yvette Wilson, T.D.P and Tyrin Turner. On the April 17, 2009, episode of The Jamie Foxx Show, Foxx and his co-hosts made several sexually suggestive and disparaging jokes regarding the teenage singer Miley Cyrus. Several days later Foxx issued a public apology on The Tonight Show with Jay Leno in response to growing public outcry and televised criticism by Cyrus's father, country singer Billy Ray Cyrus.

On April 6, 2009, Foxx, a longtime fan of country music, performed the George Strait song "You Look So Good in Love" at the George Strait Artist of the Decade All-Star Concert. Jamie Foxx hosted the 2009 BET Awards ceremony on June 28, 2009, which featured several tributes to pop star Michael Jackson, who had died three days prior to the show. As well as performing "Blame It" with T-Pain and "She Got Her Own" with Ne-Yo and Fabolous, Foxx opened the show with a rendition of Jackson's "Beat It" dance routine and closed the show with a cover of the Jackson 5's "I'll Be There" with Ne-Yo. "We want to celebrate this black man. He belongs to us and we shared him with everybody else.", said Foxx during the ceremony.

=== 2010–2012: Career progression ===
In April 2011, Foxx voiced the canary Nico in the animated film Rio. During the summer of 2011, Foxx was involved as a producer of In the Flow with Affion Crockett on Fox.

Foxx released his fourth album, Best Night of My Life, on December 21, 2010, featuring the singles "Winner" (featuring Justin Timberlake and T.I.), "Living Better Now" (featuring rapper Rick Ross) and "Fall for Your Type" (featuring rapper Drake). On October 7, the RCA Music Group announced that it was disbanding J Records along with Arista Records and Jive Records, meaning that all artists (including Foxx) previously signed to the three labels will release their future material on the RCA Records brand. In 2011, Jamie Foxx also featured on the rapper Pitbull's album Planet Pit, in the song "Where Do We Go".

In 2012, Foxx starred in the title role of the Quentin Tarantino written and directed Django Unchained. Foxx starred alongside his Ray co-star Kerry Washington, as well as Christoph Waltz, Leonardo DiCaprio and Samuel L. Jackson. In an interview about Django Unchained, Foxx told Vibe magazine: "As a black person it's always racial. ... when I get home my other homies are like how was your day? Well, I only had to be white for at least eight hours today, [or] I only had to be white for four hours." The filming was emotional as Foxx said, "It's tough shooting when you're in plantation row and that's where your ancestors were persecuted and killed."

On November 25, 2012, at BET's Soul Train Awards, Foxx joked: "It's like church in here. First of all, giving honor to God and our lord and savior Barack Obama." The joke led to condemnation from some Christians, to which Foxx responded: "I'm a comic [and] sometimes I think people get a little too tight." While hosting Saturday Night Live on December 8, 2012, to promote Django Unchained, Foxx joked about being excited "to kill all the white people in the movie". Appearing at the 2013 NAACP Image Awards, Foxx praised the achievements of black people, saying that "black people are the most talented people in the world".

=== 2013–present: Established actor ===
In 2013, Foxx was cast as President James Sawyer in White House Down alongside Channing Tatum. The following year, Foxx appeared in The Amazing Spider-Man 2 as the villain Electro, and co-starred with Quvenzhané Wallis in Annie, Sony's Will Smith and Jay-Z produced update of the comic strip-turned-musical. In 2017, Foxx starred as Bats, a trigger-happy gang member, in Edgar Wright's action film Baby Driver.

Foxx's October 2014 Deja Vu duet with Dionne Warwick appears on the Feels So Good album released by Warwick. He released his fifth studio album, Hollywood: A Story of a Dozen Roses, on May 18, 2015. It debuted atop the Top R&B/Hip-Hop Albums charts and at No. 10 on the Billboard 200. In 2015, Foxx's voice was featured in the chorus on the Ariana Grande song, "Focus".

Since its debut in 2017, Foxx has been the host and executive producer of the Fox game show Beat Shazam, whose premise is similar to the once-popular game show format Name That Tune. On the show, three sets of two partners try to beat the software application Shazam in correctly identifying the titles of popular songs for increasingly higher amounts of money, with one team eventually vying for a potential prize of $1 million. Foxx's daughter Corinne began co-hosting the show in its second season in 2018, replacing DJ October Gonzalez. The show has aired four seasons so far.

Foxx co-executive produced the 2017 Showtime sitcom White Famous, which starred Jay Pharoah as a young aspiring African-American comic, and was based on Foxx's own early career. Foxx also occasionally appeared on the show as himself. White Famous got middling reviews and ratings, and was cancelled after one season.

On May 22, 2019, Foxx appeared as George Jefferson in Live in Front of a Studio Audience: Norman Lear's All in the Family and The Jeffersons on ABC. That year, he played wrongly convicted death row prisoner Walter McMillian in the drama film Just Mercy, for which he received significant critical acclaim.

Foxx starred in Project Power, directed by Ariel Schulman and Henry Joost, opposite Joseph Gordon-Levitt and Dominique Fishback, which was released on August 14, 2020, by Netflix. That September, Foxx signed an overall deal with Sony Pictures Entertainment. Foxx then voiced the main character, jazz pianist and music teacher Joe Gardner, in the Pixar animated film Soul (2020). Due to the COVID-19 pandemic, Soul was released direct-to-streaming on Disney+ in most countries, including the United States, though it did get a theatrical release in some countries. USA Today's Brian Truitt commended Foxx's performance, saying he brought "warmth, humor and an occasional touch of exasperation" to the role.

Foxx co-created, executive produced and starred in the 2021 Netflix sitcom Dad Stop Embarrassing Me!, in which he played the single father of two teenage girls. The series marked Foxx's return to the sitcom format after The Jamie Foxx Show ended in 2001. The entire eight-episode series premiered April 14, 2021, on Netflix. It was cancelled after one season.

He reprised his role as Electro in Spider-Man: No Way Home (2021), set in the Marvel Cinematic Universe.

In 2021, Foxx released the memoir Act Like You Got Some Sense: And Other Things My Daughters Taught Me, which focused on his family life, both as a child and as an adult.

== Personal life ==
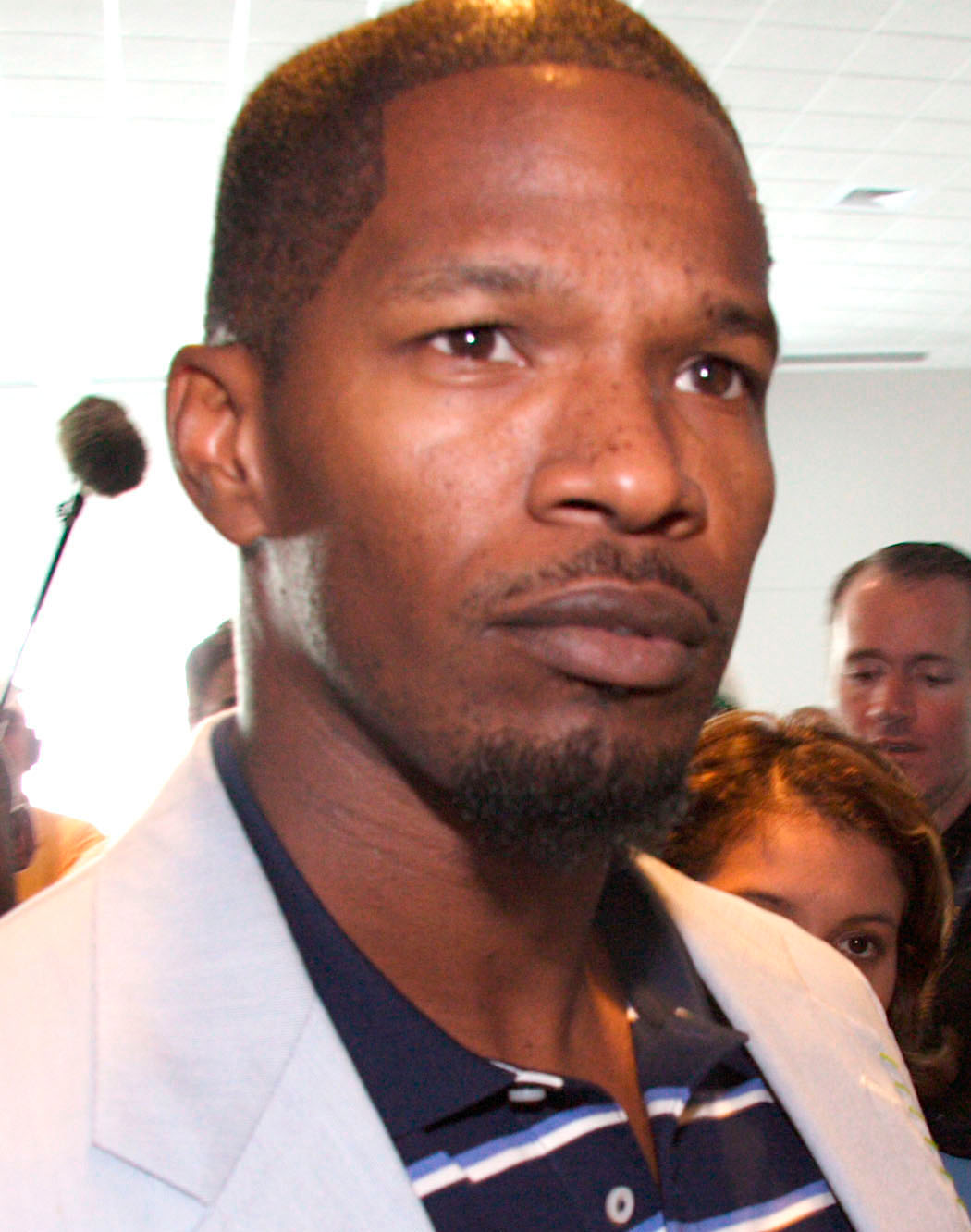
Foxx in 2005

Foxx has two daughters: model, actress, and television producer Corinne Foxx, born in 1994; and another daughter Anelise Bishop, born in 2008. Corinne made her formal debut at the Bal des débutantes in November 2014 and was named Miss Golden Globe 2016 on November 18, 2015. In May 2026, it was reported that Foxx was expecting his third child with his girlfriend, Alyce Huckstepp.

Foxx grew up a fan of the Dallas Cowboys.

In 2008, Foxx filmed a public service announcement for DoSomething to promote food drives in local communities.

From 2013 to 2019, Foxx was rumored to be in a relationship with actress Katie Holmes.

On January 18, 2016, he rescued a young man from a burning vehicle that crashed outside his home. The driver, Brett Kyle, was driving his truck "at a high rate of speed" when it left the road, traveled into a drainage ditch, and rolled over several times. Kyle was arrested for driving under the influence of alcohol.

On October 26, 2020, Foxx announced that his sister DeOndra Dixon had died. She was 36 years old and had been born with Down syndrome. She had been an ambassador for the Global Down Syndrome Foundation.

In 2026, John Davidson, a Tourette syndrome campaigner, involuntarily shouted racial slurs at the BAFTA Awards. Jamie Foxx responded publicly, calling it "unacceptable" and stating, "Nah he meant that sh**," sparking mixed reactions. Davidson later apologized, explaining his condition and expressing remorse.

=== Health problems ===
On April 12, 2023, his daughter Corinne announced that he had been hospitalized after an unspecified medical emergency, but was recovering. On May 12, amid conflicting reports about the nature of his condition, including rumors that he was gravely ill, Corinne said that her father had been "out of the hospital for weeks, recuperating". He was reportedly treated in a "physical rehab facility in Chicago" that specializes in "strokes and brain injuries". On July 22, Foxx posted a video clip commenting about his health, saying that he had been to "hell and back". On December 3, 2023, he made his first public appearance since the hospitalization, to accept a Critics Choice Association's Vanguard Award. In his speech, he disclosed that he couldn't walk at first and discussed his recovery, without detailing exactly what led to his hospitalization. Despite the news of his health challenges, he walked his daughter Corinne down the aisle in September 21, 2024 at his home in Thousand Oaks, California. On December 10, 2024, in his Netflix comedy special, Jamie Foxx: What Had Happened Was..., Foxx revealed that he had a brain bleed that led to a stroke which resulted in his hospitalization in April 2023.

=== Legal issues ===
On April 26, 2003, Foxx and his sister Deondra Dixon were confronted by security guards and had a physical struggle with police officers who arrested them at Harrah's casino in New Orleans. Employees said the Foxx party failed to show identification upon entry and "started yelling profanities" and fought with police officers after being told to leave. Foxx's sister was subdued by pepper spray after breaking free while being handcuffed and then using the handcuffs to strike out at the police officers. Two police officers were injured in the incident. Originally charged with trespassing, disturbing the peace, battery on police officers, and resisting arrest, Foxx pleaded no contest to disturbing the peace in exchange for the other charges being dropped and was sentenced to a six-month suspended jail term with two years of probation and a $1,500 fine.

In November 2023, Foxx was sued by a woman who accused him of sexually assaulting her in 2015. Foxx has denied the alleged wrongdoing.

== Discography ==
- Peep This (1994)
- Unpredictable (2005)
- Intuition (2008)
- Best Night of My Life (2010)
- Hollywood: A Story of a Dozen Roses (2015)

== Tours ==
- The Unpredictable Tour (2006)
- The Blame It Tour (2009)

== See also ==
- List of actors with Academy Award nominations
- List of actors with two or more Academy Awards in acting categories
- List of actors nominated for two Academy Awards in the same year
- List of black Academy Award winners and nominees
- List of black Golden Globe Award winners and nominees

== Bibliography ==
- Foxx, Jamie, with Nick Chiles (2021). Act Like You Got Some Sense: And Other Things My Daughters Taught Me. New York: Grand Central Publishing. ISBN 9781538703281. OCLC 1273729038.
