= Forever (Chris Brown song) =

2008 single by Chris Brown

Single by Chris Brown

from the album Exclusive: The Forever Edition
- Released: April 29, 2008
- Studio: Village Studios (Los Angeles)
- Genre: Dance-pop
- Length: 4:38
- Label: Jive; Zomba
- Songwriters: Chris Brown; Jamal Jones; Brian Kennedy; Andre Merritt; Rob Allen
- Producers: Polow da Don; Brian Kennedy

Chris Brown singles chronology
"Take You Down" (2008)	"Forever" (2008)	"Dreamer" (2008)

Music video
- "Forever" on YouTube

"Forever" is a song by American singer Chris Brown. Brown co-wrote the song with Andre Merritt, Rob Allen, Brian Kennedy, and Jamal "Polow da Don" Jones; the latter two are also the producers. Initially created to be used for a Doublemint commercial, "Forever" was selected to be released as the lead single from the reissue version of Brown's second studio album Exclusive, titled the Forever Edition, and the fifth single overall from the album. It was first released for digital download on November 2, 2007, in a few countries, followed the next April with a retail single CD released in Europe.

The song reached number one in Ireland and New Zealand as well as peaking within the top ten in Australia, Canada, United Kingdom and United States. It also reached the top forty in Denmark, Germany and Switzerland. The accompanying music video features Brown in several scenes pursuing his love interest. The video features many dancers and digital effects. The official remix features Lil Wayne and Lupe Fiasco.

== Background ==
The song was written by Brown and his songwriting team, the Graffiti Artists (Rob Allen and Andre Merritt). He stated that after entering the studio, Polow da Don created a beat that Brown wrote along to. Because the producer's style was "more of a European, techno, house-type feel," the group "wanted to give it that other side of crossover, and go a little bit to that pop realm". "Forever" is one of four new songs Brown recorded for the re-release of his second studio album Exclusive. The song was first intended to be on Brown's following album, but decided he "wasn't ready to release a new album yet".

"Forever" is an extended version of a commercial jingle for Doublemint gum, commissioned by an advertising company working for Wrigley. Brown first created the short version for the commercial, then extended and expanded it into a full song during a recording session in February 2008, which was paid for by the gum company. Originally, the plan was to follow up his third single, "With You", with the Kanye West-featuring "Down", but the new material won out. Although the label initially was reluctant to release "Forever" as a single, the song was so "potent and strong" that it overruled any hesitations regarding its commercial connections.

== Release ==
The song was first released for digital download on November 2, 2007, in Denmark, Belgium, and New Zealand, and on November 6 in France. The next year, it was released on April 22, 2008, in Australia, Canada, and Japan, then on August 12, 2008, in the United States and Germany.

An EP featuring three remixes was released in Ireland on June 13, 2008, in Australia, Austria and the Netherlands on June 16, 2008, and in Japan on August 13, 2008.

== Composition ==
"Forever" is a dance-pop love song that runs for 4 minutes and 38 seconds. It contains influences of trance and techno, as well as of Timbaland's production style, with synthesized voices over a drum machine pattern. Brown performed the song using the autotune vocal effect, as he did in one of his previous singles, "Kiss Kiss".

== Music video ==
=== Background and synopsis ===
The two-day shoot took place in Los Angeles, California, at the beginning of March 2008. It was directed by Joseph Kahn. The video premiered on TRL on April 30, 2008, and on BET's 106 & Park on May 5, 2008. The video reached number one on the MTV Online Chart. BET placed the song at number 55 on their Notarized: Top 100 Videos countdown. Brown's main love interest in the video is played by model Megan Abrigo.

The music video starts off with Brown driving up to a nightclub, unwrapping a fresh stick of Doublemint gum, and walking inside. People are seen dancing while Brown starts to sing the first verse. Brown is also seen singing with light effects circling him. During the choruses, Brown and his background dancers start to house dance on the empty dance floor. Among the dancers are Marie Courchinoux and Rino Nakasone Razalan from Beat Freaks. In the second verse, Brown is walking outside the club following his love interest. Later he is seen performing a 540 crescent kick in front of a water fountain. During the bridge, Brown is seen in the top roof with his love interest; the girl falls off the roof and Brown jumps to catch her. The two land safely, and after the final chorus, Brown drives away from the club.

=== Reception ===
According to the Billboard, the song's video is "digital dream about sharing with one who makes your world stop." The video was popular in American television. The video for "Forever" debuted on BET's 106 & Park at number 10 on July 21, 2008, before finally reach number 2 and has stayed in the countdown for nine days. The video also has reached number 2 on for 8 days MTV TRL and has stayed in the countdown for 29 days.

The video for "Forever" was also popular enough across Asia, by debuting at number 13 on MTV Asia program, "Chart Attack", which count 20 most popular video in Asia and so far has peaked at number 1 replacing Mariah Carey's "Bye Bye". "Forever" also debuted at number 7 on MTV Hip Hop Countdown; MTV Asian program which count 10 most popular urban video in the region and has reached number 1 for six consecutive weeks. In UK, it has reached number 1 on MTV Base. It also has peaked at number 1 on the MTV Online Chart for several weeks. The video was nominated in the "Best Dancing in a Video", "Best Choreography" and "Video of the Year" categories 2008 MTV Video Music Awards.

== Critical reception ==
Bill Lamb of About.com gave the song four and a half stars, and said it was one of Brown's best to date. Billboard stated that the single "is really a love song but bangs with electrified production from Polow Da Don to ignite dancefloors." Alex Fletcher of Digital Spy gave the song two out of five stars, saying "Listening to 'Forever' is a pleasant enough experience, but this track never truly sparks into life or finds its own identity." He went on to say that, "His style is a bit hard to distinguish from Usher, Ne-Yo and the rest of the current crop of American male solo artists." HotNewHipHop mentioned "Forever" as a "standout track in Chris Brown’s discography, highlighting his ability to craft timeless hits that transcend musical genres".

== Chart performance ==
"Forever" has reached number one in Ireland and New Zealand, and the top ten in Australia, Canada, the United States and the UK.

The song debuted at number six on the Billboard Hot Digital Songs on May 10, 2008, selling 113,072 digital downloads on its first week. Due to its high digital sales, "Forever" debuted at number nine on the Billboard Hot 100, making it the highest debut of that week along with Jesse McCartney's "Leavin'" which debuted at number fourteen; it became Brown's ninth top-ten single. The song also debuted at number nine on the Canadian Hot 100 based only on digital sales and has peaked there for 3 non-consecutive weeks, before finally jumped to number two. It has peaked at number two on the Billboard Hot 100 for two weeks. Coincidentally, “Disturbia” was written by Brown and originally intended to be the lead single for Exclusive: Forever Edition, however “Forever” was ultimately chosen instead. In 2021 it has been certified sextuple platinum by the Recording Industry Association of America (RIAA). It also stayed in the top ten for 15 weeks. It has sold over 3,830,000 copies as of April 2014.

"Forever" began receiving airplay on pop and rhythmic radio stations across the US while urban radio stations still playing his previous single, "Take You Down". The song has finally been added to urban radio stations in the week of July 7, 2008, and made a debut at number ninety-five on the Billboard Hot R&B/Hip-Hop Songs, peaking at number seventy-two. "Forever" debuted at number sixty-three on the Billboard Hot 100 Airplay, and has peaked at number-one on the Hot 100 Airplay, staying there for three weeks.

"Forever" has entered various Billboard charts including number one on the Hot 100 Airplay, Mainstream Top 40, Pop 100, Pop 100 Airplay, Hot Digital Songs, Hot Digital Tracks, and Hot RingMasters.

"Forever" also became a hit across Oceania. "Forever" debuted at number 40 on the New Zealand RIANZ Singles Chart, and in its second week ascended to number 5 before reaching its peak at number 1, due to high digital sales. "Forever" became Brown's eighth top ten hit in the country. It sat at number 1 on the official RIANZ Singles Chart for eight weeks. It became his fifth number one single in New Zealand, after "Run It!", "Kiss Kiss", "With You" and "No Air". It has been certified Platinum by RIANZ for sales in excess of 15,000, and was the third biggest selling single of 2008 in New Zealand. "Forever" debuted at number 29 on the Australian ARIA Singles Chart, and the following week rose to number 16, later peaking at number 7.

The song also became successful across Europe. In the UK, the song charted on June 1, 2008, at number 17 on downloads alone. The following week it moved up to number 11, and a week later, to number 8 (still on downloads alone). "Forever" was physically released on June 16, 2008, and on the chart dated June 29, 2008, it reached its peak position at number 4, becoming Chris Brown's second highest charting solo single in the UK at the time, behind "Run It!", which peaked at number 2. It has sold 209,275 copies and stayed in the top ten for six weeks, becoming his third highest-selling single there after "With You" (221,750 copies) and "No Air" (316,630 copies). In Ireland, "Forever" debuted at number 9, and two weeks later peaked at number 6. In the next week, for the issue dated June 22, "Forever" took the top spot on the Irish Singles Chart, becoming his first number-one single in that country, and stayed at number 1 for two non-consecutive weeks. The song also reached number 12 on European Hot 100 Singles.

== In other media ==
- On July 16, 2008, Comfort Fedoke and Stephen "Twitch" Boss from the US television reality program and dance competition So You Think You Can Dance danced to "Forever" as the part of the competition. Quest Crew and SoReal Cru danced to this song on America's Best Dance Crew.
- In 2009 American parody comedy movie Dance Flick, the song was used in a scene where the protagonist is in a club, and when Forever comes up he screams "This is my song!" and he starts dancing.
- On July 19, 2009, a video was uploaded on YouTube that received significant media attention, using "Forever" as the song to a wedding march. The video, known as the JK Wedding Entrance Dance video, received over 1.7 million views in its first seven days. The popularity of the video caused a resurgence of the song, landing it back into the top ten singles on iTunes. By July 4, 2023, the video had received 105,101,387 hits. The couple in the video asked that donations be made to a domestic violence charity because of Brown's felony assault against Rihanna six months earlier.
- On October 8, 2009, "Forever" was used in the American version of The Office at Jim and Pam's wedding as part of an homage of the aforementioned JK Wedding. In 2010 it was used in another JK Wedding homage, in the Irish TV series Love/Hate.

== Track listing ==
Australian CD single
No.	Title	Producer(s)	Length
1.	"Forever"	Polow da Don; Brian Kennedy	4:38
2.	"Forever" (23 Deluxe remix)	Polow da Don; Kennedy; 23 Deluxe^{[a]}	6:00
3.	"Forever" (Cahill Club Mix)	Polow da Don; Kennedy; Cahill^{[a]}	6:23
4.	"Forever" (BobbyBass & J Remy Club Mix)	Polow da Don; Kennedy; BobbyBass^{[a]}; J Remy^{[a]}	7:36

UK digital single
No.	Title	Producer(s)	Length
1.	"Forever"	Polow da Don; Kennedy	4:38
2.	"Forever" (23 Deluxe remix)	Polow da Don; Kennedy; 23 Deluxe^{[a]}	6:03
3.	"Forever" (Cahill Club Mix)	Polow da Don; Kennedy; Cahill^{[a]}	6:29
4.	"Forever" (Ashanti Boyz remix)	Polow da Don; Kennedy; Ashanti Boyz^{[a]}	4:24

Notes

- ^{^[a]} signifies co-producer(s)

== Credits and personnel ==
- Vocals: Chris Brown, Keri Hilson (background)
- Writers: C. Brown, J. Jones, B. Kennedy, R. Allen, A. Merritt
- Producers: Polow da Don for Zone 4 Inc. and Brian Kennedy
- Recording: Jason Scweitzer at Village Studios, and Doug Fenske for Real Records, LLC at Westlake Audio, Los Angeles
- Mixing: Phil Tan for Riotproof Productions at Soapbox Studios, Atlanta
- Assistant: Josh Houghkir
- Mastered by: Chris Athens at Sterling Sound, New York City

== Charts ==
=== Weekly charts ===
Weekly chart performance for "Forever"
Chart (2008–2009)	Peak position
Australia (ARIA)	7
Australian Urban (ARIA)	2
Austria (Ö3 Austria Top 40)	31
Belgium (Ultratop 50 Flanders)	47
Belgium (Ultratop 50 Wallonia)	40
Canada Hot 100 (Billboard)	2
Denmark (Tracklisten)	17
Europe (Eurochart Hot 100)	12
France (SNEP)	25
Germany (GfK)	20
Hungary (Rádiós Top 40)	26
Ireland (IRMA)	1
Japan Hot 100 (Billboard)	88
Netherlands (Dutch Top 40)	24
Netherlands (Single Top 100)	51
New Zealand (Recorded Music NZ)	1
Scottish Singles Sales (Official Charts)	3
Sweden (Sverigetopplistan)	17
Switzerland (Schweizer Hitparade)	22
UK Singles (Official Charts)	4
UK Hip Hop/R&B (Official Charts)	1
US Billboard Hot 100	2
US Adult Pop Airplay (Billboard)	40
US Dance Airplay (Billboard)	17
US Hot R&B/Hip-Hop Songs (Billboard)	66
US Latin Rhythm Airplay (Billboard)	8
US Pop Airplay (Billboard)	1
US Rhythmic Airplay (Billboard)	3

=== Year-end charts ===
2008 year-end chart performance for "Forever"
Chart (2008)	Position
Australia (ARIA)	20
Australian Urban (ARIA)	8
Brazil (Crowley)	51
Canada (Canadian Hot 100)	13
Canada CHR/Top 40 (Billboard)	2
Europe (Eurochart Hot 100)	69
Hungary (Rádiós Top 40)	92
Ireland (IRMA)	15
New Zealand (RIANZ)	4
UK Singles (OCC)	46
US Billboard Hot 100	10
US Mainstream Top 40 (Billboard)	5
US Rhythmic Airplay (Billboard)	12

2009 year-end chart performance for "Forever"
Chart (2009)	Position
Australian Urban (ARIA)	32
Hungary (Rádiós Top 40)	164

=== Decade-end charts ===
Decade-end chart performance for "Forever"
Chart (2000–2009)	Position
Australia (ARIA)	72
US Billboard Hot 100	100

== Certifications ==
Certifications for "Forever"
Region	Certification	Certified units/sales
Australia (ARIA)	5× Platinum	350,000^{‡}
Denmark (IFPI Danmark)	2× Platinum	180,000^{‡}
New Zealand (RMNZ)	6× Platinum	180,000^{‡}
Norway (IFPI Norway)	2× Platinum	20,000^{*}
United Kingdom (BPI)	2× Platinum	1,200,000^{‡}
United States (RIAA)	8× Platinum	8,000,000^{‡}
United States (RIAA) (Mastertone)	Gold	500,000^{^}
^{*} Sales figures based on certification alone.^{^} Shipments figures based on certification alone.^{‡} Sales+streaming figures based on certification alone.
