= Superhuman (Chris Brown song) =

Single by Chris Brown featuring Keri Hilson

from the album Exclusive: The Forever Edition
- B-side: "Dreamer"
- Released: October 3, 2008
- Recorded: 2008
- Studio: The Underlab, Los Angeles, California
- Genre: R&B; pop
- Length: 3:39
- Label: Jive; Zomba
- Songwriters: Warren "Oak" Felder; James Fauntleroy
- Producers: Oak Felder; Harvey Mason, Jr.

Chris Brown singles chronology
"Dreamer" (2008)	"Superhuman" (2008)	"Freeze" (2008)

Keri Hilson singles chronology
"Energy" (2008)	"Superhuman" (2008)	"Return the Favor" (2008)

Music video
- "Superhuman" on YouTube

"Superhuman" is the second single released by American singer Chris Brown from the re-issue Exclusive: The Forever Edition, and the sixth and final single overall off his second studio album Exclusive. The song is a duet with R&B singer Keri Hilson. The song is certified Platinum in Australia, and Gold in the US and New Zealand.

== Composition ==
"Superhuman" is an R&B and pop power ballad, with lyrics about romantic love bettering a couple's personal perception of themselves and life.

== Music video ==
The song's music video was directed by Erik White, and filmed in Charlotte, North Carolina. The video was released on October 15, 2008. "Superhuman" was Brown's seventh video directed by White and was shot back-to-back with Ludacris' "What Them Girls Like" and "Dreamer".

== Critical reception ==
Bill Lamb of Digital Spy said that the song is "sumptuous, dramatic and charged with emotion", complimenting the duo's "silky-smooth" vocal chemistry. That Grape Juice praised the duo's performance as well, stating that on "Superhuman" they're "meshing surprisingly well".

== Chart performance ==
Despite initially not being officially released as a single, "Superhuman" debuted at number 40 on the New Zealand RIANZ Singles Chart and peaked at number 15, becoming the album's sixth top 20 hit in New Zealand. The song was certified Gold after seventeen weeks selling over 7,500 copies. It also debuted at number 33 in Ireland and number 40 on the UK Singles Chart following the premiere of the music video. The song has reached number 32 on the UK Singles Chart, and was physically released in the UK on November 24, 2008. "Superhuman" has also become Brown's 6th Top 20 hit in Ireland, peaking at number 15 on the Irish Singles Chart. It debuted, the first week on the Australian Singles Chart on November 3, 2008, at number 36, and has peaked at number 30. The single peaked at number 109 in the United States, becoming his first single to miss the Billboard Hot 100.

== Track listing ==
UK and Ireland CD single

1. "Superhuman" (featuring Keri Hilson)
2. "Dreamer"

== Credits and personnel ==
Credits according to AllMusic:

- Vocals: C. Brown & K. Hilson
- Writers: W. Felder, J. Faunteroy II
- Producers: Harvey Mason Jr. for Underdog Music, inc. & Oak of The Knightwritaz for Ninetimesnine Entertainment
- Recording: Andrew Hey & Dabling Harward at The Underlab, Los Angeles, CA
- Additional engineering: David Boyd for Underdog Entertainment at The Underlab, Los Angeles, CA
- Mixing: Harvey Mason Jr. for Underdog Entertainment at The Underlab, Los Angeles, California
- Production coordination: David "Touch" Wright & Angela N. Golightly for Underdog Entertainment and Donnie Meadows & Tanisha Broadwater for Starr Island Management
- All music by: Oak of The Knightwritaz for Ninetimesnine Entertainment
- Keri Hilson appears courtesy of Mosley Music Group and Interscope Records

== Charts ==
=== Weekly charts ===
Weekly chart performance for "Superhuman"
Chart (2008)	Peak position
Australian Singles Chart	30
Belgium (Ultratip Bubbling Under Flanders)	19
European Hot 100 Singles	79
Irish Singles Chart	15
New Zealand Singles Chart	15
Sweden (Sverigetopplistan)	19
UK Singles Chart	32
UK Hip Hop/R&B	6
US Bubbling Under Hot 100 Singles (Billboard)	9
US Bubbling Under R&B/Hip-Hop Singles (Billboard)	20
US Pop 100 (Billboard)	74

=== Year-end charts ===
2008 year-end chart performance for "Superhuman"
Chart (2008)	Position
New Zealand (RIANZ)	46

== Certifications ==
Certifications for "Superhuman"
Region	Certification	Certified units/sales
Australia (ARIA)	Platinum	70,000^{‡}
New Zealand (RMNZ)	Gold	7,500^{*}
United States (RIAA)	Gold	500,000^{^}
^{*} Sales figures based on certification alone.^{^} Shipments figures based on certification alone.^{‡} Sales+streaming figures based on certification alone.
