= Exclusive (album) =

Studio album by Chris Brown
- Released: November 6, 2007
- Recorded: 2006–07
- Genre: R&B
- Length: 53:15
- Labels: CBE; Jive; Zomba; Sony BMG
- Producers: Chris Brown; Bryan-Michael Cox; Dre & Vidal; Jazze Pha; Scott Storch; J.R. Rotem; Jim Jonsin; Swizz Beatz; T-Pain; The Underdogs; will.i.am; StarGate; The Runners; Tank; Polow da Don; Sean Garrett; Danja; State of Emergency; Lamar Edwards; Don Cheegro; Dirty Harry; Los da Mystro; Walter "Great" Scott; Theodore "MaddScientist" Thomas; Rob Knox; Antonio Dixon; Eric Dawkins; Derrick Baker; T-wiz; Brian Kennedy; Harvey Mason Jr.; Warren "Oak" Felder; Eric Hudson

Chris Brown chronology
| Chris Brown (2005) | Exclusive (2007) | Graffiti (2009) |

Singles from Exclusive
- 1. "Wall to Wall" Released: May 29, 2007; 2. "Kiss Kiss" Released: September 11, 2007; 3. "With You" Released: December 4, 2007; 4. "Take You Down" Released: April 6, 2008

Deluxe edition cover
- Exclusive: The Forever Edition

Singles from Exclusive: The Forever Edition
- 1. "Forever" Released: April 29, 2008; 2. "Superhuman" Released: October 3, 2008

Exclusive is the second studio album by American singer Chris Brown. It was released on November 6, 2007, by CBE and Jive Records. The record serves as Chris Brown's second studio release under his CBE record label, as well as with Jive. The record also serves as the follow-up to his multi-platinum selling debut album, Chris Brown (2005).

Exclusive is an R&B record that also borrows from pop, hip-hop and electronic music. Lyrically it revolves around romance. The album was commercially successful worldwide. It debuted at number four on the US Billboard 200, selling 295,000 copies in the first week. The album was supported by five singles, three of which—"Kiss Kiss", "With You" and "Forever"—achieved top-three positions on the Billboard Hot 100, also charting highly on other charts worldwide. The album earned a quadruple platinum certification by the Recording Industry Association of America (RIAA) in the United States. Exclusive received generally positive reviews from critics, that praised Brown's performances.

On June 3, 2008, Exclusive was re-released as a double-disc deluxe edition, titled The Forever Edition, which includes 4 more songs, including the singles "Forever" and "Superhuman", and a bonus DVD featuring behind-the-scenes footage from his tour and his music videos.

== Background ==
In 2006, following the success of Brown's self-titled album, the singer started to work on his sophomore album, developing its concept along with Tina Davis and Mark Pitts. Brown co-wrote half of the tracks along with different writers, including Sean Garrett, James Fauntleroy, Johntá Austin and Tank. The musical direction aimed for Exclusive was different to the hip hop soul-influenced sound of the previous album, being worked as an R&B album appealable to a wider public.

Originally, Brown intended to name his album Graduation. However, after discovering that Kanye West planned to use the same title for his third studio album, which was set to be released that year, Brown respected West's decision and changed his album's title to Exclusive. Brown explained to MTV News: "at first I was naming it Graduation because I was 18, but then Kanye was like, 'I heard Chris is naming his album Graduation. I'm naming mine ... .', I was like, I'll change mine because I respect his reason more with College Dropout and Late Registration, all that, so it kind of went with his. So I was like, I don't need mine to be Graduation, you know, I'll change mine to Exclusive, because I'll make an album exclusively for my fans". The album was originally set to be released on August 28, 2007, but was delayed until November of that year.

== Singles ==
The album's lead single, "Wall to Wall" was released on May 29, 2007. The song was produced by Sean Garrett, written by Walter Scott. The single reached at number 79 on the US Billboard Hot 100, due to no digital release for this single.

"Kiss Kiss"; a collaboration with a fellow American recording artist T-Pain, was released as the album's second single on September 11, 2007. Following the non-success of his first single, this single became a big success in the United States. The song reached at number one on the Billboard Hot 100, and number 6 on the Canadian Hot 100, also reaching the top ten in Australia, Canada and New Zealand.

"With You" was released as the album's third single on December 4, 2007. The song was produced by the production team StarGate. The single became his second successful single in the most international music markets. It has since become one of the highest-charting singles of Brown's solo career, entering the foreign music markets, where his previous efforts have failed to these charts. It has reached the top ten; including in Australia, Canada, Ireland, New Zealand, and United Kingdom.

The re-release of its first single from The Forever Edition, called "Forever" (produced by Polow da Don). It was released on April 29, 2008. The song debuted at number 9 on the Billboard Hot 100, due to its high digital sales. However, it dropped quickly due to the lack of sales during these following weeks. The song then re-entered the top ten again, after airplay increases and has peaked at number 2.

== Critical reception ==
Professional ratings
Aggregate scores
| Source | Rating |
|---|---|
| Metacritic | 69/100 |
Review scores
| Source | Rating |
| AllMusic | 4/5 stars |
| Boston Globe | 4/5 stars |
| Entertainment Weekly | B− |
| The New York Times | (favorable) |
| PopMatters | 6/10 stars |
| Rolling Stone | 3.5/5 stars |
| Slant Magazine | 2/5 stars |
| USA Today | 3.5/4 stars |
| Vibe | (favorable) |
| The Washington Post | (mixed) |

Exclusive received generally positive reviews from critics, scoring 69 out of 100 based on 11 reviews on Metacritic. Andy Kellman of AllMusic praised Brown's singing ability while reviewing the album and noted that its material "[pushes] all the right target-demographic buttons". Rob Sheffield from Rolling Stone said that “Brown seals the deal with Exclusive, an all-grown-up album on a level with Justin Timberlake's Justified (2002), Rihanna's Good Girl Gone Bad (2007) or even Bobby Brown's King of Stage (1986)", ending up saying "it's hard to imagine he doesn't have an album's worth of hits here". Mark Hammers of Boston Globe in a positive review said that "If there was ever a record created to turn an R&B singer into a superstar, it's Brown's sophomore effort". Vibe's Iyana Robertson stated that on Exclusive Brown is "tapping more electric up-tempos, swimming deep in hip-hop waters and annihilating the pop arena". HotNewHipHop in a retrospective review commented that "Exclusive undeniably cemented Chris Brown's foothold in the music industry as more than a fleeting teenage sensation. Its release heralded the arrival of a versatile artist capable of sculpting his youthful exuberance into a more polished, varied sound."

Neil Drumming from Entertainment Weekly rated the album a B− saying that, "Like his onscreen (This Christmas) character, Brown is most charming when he's playing up his youth: singing of MySpace romance, meeting his girl's 'pops,' and such". But he also said, "sadly, Brown's adolescent voice and playful scatting — while cute — are steamrolled by pushy collaborators, whether it's those Stargate guys (Ne-Yo, Rihanna) falling back on that ol' guitar noodling, or T-Pain milking his vocoder. Ease back, people, and let the boy sing". However, Sal Cinquemani of Slant Magazine criticized the unoriginality of the album, writing, "...there's still nothing very 'exclusive' about Exclusive at all." Michael Arceneaux of PopMatters wrote, "Exclusive seems aimless, an album where Brown is doing what he's told versus being the anchor of his own ship." The album ranked number 34 on Rolling Stone's list of the Top 50 Albums of 2007.

=== Awards and nominations ===
At the 2008 Grammy Awards, Exclusive was nominated for a Grammy Award in the category of "Best Rap/Sung Collaboration" for "Kiss Kiss", a collaboration with T-Pain. However, the award was given to the 2007 single, "Umbrella" by Rihanna featuring Jay-Z. The album also nominated for an NAACP Image Awards in a category for "Best Album", while Brown himself won for "Best Male Artist". At the 2008 BET Awards, the singer received 4 nominations in four categories, including "Best Male R&B Artist", "Best Collaboration" for "Kiss Kiss", and "Viewer's Choice" for "Kiss Kiss" and "No Air", his duet with Jordin Sparks. At the American Music Awards of 2008 Brown won for Artist of the Year.

On June 22, 2008, Fearne & Reggie revealed on their UK's chart show BBC Radio 1, that all three tracks from the album Exclusive have appeared on the top forty. Two of which on the top ten, including "With You" (at number 35), "No Air" with Jordin Sparks (at number 2), and "Forever" (at number 5).

Awards and nominations for Exclusive
| Year | Ceremony | Category | Result | Ref. |
|---|---|---|---|---|
| 2008 | NAACP Image Awards | Outstanding Album | Nominated | |

== Commercial performance ==
Exclusive debuted at number four on the US Billboard 200 chart, with first-week sales of 294,000 copies in the United States. As of March 2011, the album has sold 1,973,000 copies in the United States. In 2021, the album was certified quadruple platinum by the Recording Industry Association of America (RIAA) for sales of over four million copies in the United States.

In the United Kingdom, the album debuted at number 31 on the UK Albums Chart and eventually peaked at number three on the chart. It spent a total of 52 weeks on the chart. On September 5, 2008, the album was certified platinum by the British Phonographic Industry (BPI) for sales of over 300,000 copies in the UK.

== Track listing ==
Standard edition
| No. | Title | Writer(s) | Producer(s) | Length |
|---|---|---|---|---|
| 1. | "Throwed" | Chris Brown; Kendrick "Wyldcard" Dean; Adonis Shropshire | State of Emergency; Bryan-Michael Cox | 3:01 |
| 2. | "Kiss Kiss" (featuring T-Pain) | Brown; Faheem Najm | T-Pain | 4:10 |
| 3. | "Take You Down" | Brown; Harvey Mason Jr.; Steve Russell; James Fauntleroy II | The Underdogs; Lamar Edwards | 4:05 |
| 4. | "With You" | Johntá Austin | StarGate; Espionage* | 4:12 |
| 5. | "Picture Perfect" (featuring will.i.am) | Brown; William Adams, Jr.; Keith Harris; Tank; Ralph Carmichael | will.i.am; Brown | 4:13 |
| 6. | "Hold Up" (featuring Big Boi) | Jamal Harris; Ryan Toby; Sammie Bush, Jr.; Antwan Patton | Dre & Vidal; Don Cheegro; Dirty Harry | 3:48 |
| 7. | "You" | Carlos McKinney; Terius Nash | Los da Mystro | 3:22 |
| 8. | "Damage" | Brown; Corey "Latif" Williams | The Runners | 4:16 |
| 9. | "Wall to Wall" | Sean Garrett; Walter "Great" Scott | Garrett; Scott | 3:43 |
| 10. | "Help Me" | Mason, Jr.; Fauntleroy II | The Underdogs; Rob Knox | 3:17 |
| 11. | "I Wanna Be" | Joi Campbell; Tank; Joseph "Lonny" Bereal | Antonio Dixon; Eric Dawkins | 3:46 |
| 12. | "Gimme Whatcha Got" (featuring Lil Wayne) | Brown; Nash; Williams; Dwayne Carter, Jr. | Jazze Pha | 3:48 |
| 13. | "I'll Call Ya" | Garrett | Swizz Beatz | 3:53 |
| 14. | "Lottery" | Mason, Jr.; Thomas; Fauntleroy II | The Underdogs; Knox | 3:41 |

Special bonus tracks
| No. | Title | Writer(s) | Producer(s) | Length |
|---|---|---|---|---|
| 15. | "Nice" (featuring The Game) | Brown; Jayceon Taylor | Scott Storch | 4:32 |
| 16. | "Down" (featuring Kanye West) | Brown; Kanye West; Andre Merritt | Bigg D | 4:17 |
| Total length: | | | | 62:04 |

UK/digital "expanded edition" bonus tracks
| No. | Title | Writer(s) | Producer(s) | Length |
|---|---|---|---|---|
| 15. | "Get at Ya" | Brown | The Underdogs | 3:18 |
| 16. | "Mama" | Brown | Eric Hudson | 4:24 |
| 17. | "Nice" (featuring The Game) | Brown; Taylor | Storch | 4:32 |
| 18. | "Down" (featuring Kanye West) | Brown; West; Merritt | Bigg D | 4:17 |

Japan bonus tracks
| No. | Title | Writer(s) | Producer(s) | Length |
|---|---|---|---|---|
| 19. | "Fallen Angel" | Brown; Donnie Scantz; WyldCard; Adonis Shropshire | Cox; State of Emergency | 5:34 |

Limited edition DVD
| No. | Title | Length |
|---|---|---|
| 1. | "Journey to South Africa" | 15:00 |
| 2. | "Behind the Scenes of "Wall to Wall"" | 15:00 |
| 3. | "Wall to Wall" (music video) | 5:20 |
| 4. | "Behind the Scenes of "Kiss Kiss"" | 12:37 |
| 5. | "Kiss Kiss" (music video) | 4:25 |

The Forever Edition US version
| No. | Title | Writer(s) | Producer(s) | Length |
|---|---|---|---|---|
| 17. | "Forever" | Brown; Rob Allen; Andre Merritt | Polow da Don; Brian Kennedy | 4:38 |
| 18. | "Superhuman" (featuring Keri Hilson) | Fauntleroy II | Harvey Mason Jr.; Warren "Oak" Felder | 3:38 |
| 19. | "Heart Ain't a Brain" | Mason, Jr.; Thomas; Fauntleroy II; Antwoine Collins | The Underdogs, T-wiz | 3:40 |
| 20. | "Picture Perfect" (featuring Bow Wow and Hurricane Chris) | Brown; Adams, Jr.; Harris; Carmichael; Tank; Shad Moss; Christopher Dooley, Jr. | Brown; will.i.am | 4:11 |

Re-Released Australian version
| No. | Title | Writer(s) | Producer(s) | Length |
|---|---|---|---|---|
| 15. | "Nice" (featuring The Game) | Brown; Jayceon Taylor | Scott Storch | 4:32 |
| 16. | "Down" (featuring Kanye West) | Brown; Kanye West; Andre Merritt | Bigg D | 4:17 |
| 17. | "Forever" | Brown; Rob Allen; Andre Merritt | Polow da Don; Brian Kennedy | 4:38 |
| 18. | "Superhuman" (featuring Keri Hilson) | Fauntleroy II | Harvey Mason Jr.; Warren "Oak" Felder | 3:38 |
| 19. | "Heart Ain't a Brain" | Mason, Jr.; Thomas; Fauntleroy II; Antwoine Collins | The Underdogs, T-wiz | 3:40 |
| 20. | "Picture Perfect" (featuring Bow Wow and Hurricane Chris) | Brown; Adams, Jr.; Harris; Carmichael; Tank; Shad Moss; Christopher Dooley, Jr. | Brown; will.i.am | 4:11 |

The Forever Edition UK/Japan CD version
| No. | Title | Writer(s) | Producer(s) | Length |
|---|---|---|---|---|
| 17. | "Fallen Angel" | Brown; Scantz; WyldCard; Shropshire | Cox; State of Emergency | 5:34 |
| 18. | "Forever" | Brown; Allen; Merritt | Polow da Don; Kennedy | 4:38 |
| 19. | "Superhuman" (featuring Keri Hilson) | | | 3:39 |
| 20. | "Heart Ain't a Brain" | Mason, Jr.; Thomas; D. Jackson; Fauntleroy II; Antwoine Collins | The Underdogs, T-wiz | 3:40 |

The Forever Edition includes a DVD with a documentary titled "Chris Brown on Tour", which is a montage of performances from his Up-Close & Personal Tour and behind-the-scenes footage. It also features a cameo appearance from Keyshia Cole, who held her own sold-out Just like You tour.

Japanese limited edition DVD
| No. | Title | Length |
|---|---|---|
| 1. | "Wall to Wall" (music video) |
| 2. | "Kiss Kiss" (music video) |
| 3. | "With You" (music video) |
| 4. | "Forever" (music video) |
| 5. | "Chris Brown on Tour" (documentary) |
| 6. | "Wall to Wall" (featuring [Jadakiss])" (music video) |

Two versions of The Forever Edition were made available; the first included the DVD, and the second did not. Only the CD edition was made available in the United Kingdom, while most other countries had both editions available.

Notes

- (co.) signifies a co-producer.

Sample credits

- "Picture Perfect" samples "A Quiet Place" written by Ralph Carmichael, as performed by Take 6.

== BET bonus DVD ==
BET Presents Chris Brown is a DVD originally packaged with Exclusive, exclusively at Walmart. The release features BET highlights, performance highlights, and music videos from throughout Brown's career at that time. It also includes an interview where Brown talks about the making of Exclusive.

== Production ==
- Executive producers: Chris Brown, Clive Calder and Phineas Kelly
- Album mastered by Chris Athens at Sterling Sound, NYC
- A&R administration: Shay Young
- A&R coordination: Leticia Hilliard
- Production coordination: Cara Hutchinson, Brian Gately
- Clearances: David Schmidt, Kobie "The Quarterback" Brown, Donato Guadagnoli, Mattias Eng
- Art direction and design: Courtney Walter
- Photography: Dave Hill and Mark Mann
- Styling: Mike Bogard for Blynn Group

== Charts ==
=== Weekly charts ===
Weekly chart performance for Exclusive
| Chart (2007–2008) | Peak position |
|---|---|
| Australian Albums (ARIA) | 5 |
| Australian Urban Albums (ARIA) | 1 |
| Belgian Albums (Ultratop Flanders) | 23 |
| Belgian Albums (Ultratop Wallonia) | 29 |
| Canadian Albums (Billboard) | 16 |
| Danish Albums (Hitlisten) | 20 |
| Dutch Albums (Album Top 100) | 68 |
| French Albums (SNEP) | 53 |
| German Albums (Offizielle Top 100) | 91 |
| Irish Albums (IRMA) | 2 |
| Japanese Albums (Oricon) | 14 |
| New Zealand Albums (RMNZ) | 3 |
| Scottish Albums (Official Charts) | 5 |
| Swedish Albums (Sverigetopplistan) | 42 |
| Swiss Albums (Schweizer Hitparade) | 28 |
| UK Albums (Official Charts) | 3 |
| UK R&B Albums (Official Charts) | 1 |
| US Billboard 200 | 4 |
| US Top R&B/Hip-Hop Albums (Billboard) | 2 |

=== Year-end charts ===
2007 year-end chart performance for Exclusive
| Chart (2007) | Position |
|---|---|
| Australian Urban Albums (ARIA) | 17 |
| US Billboard 200 | 175 |
| US Top R&B/Hip-Hop Albums (Billboard) | 59 |

2008 year-end chart performance for Exclusive
| Chart (2008) | Position |
|---|---|
| Australian Albums (ARIA) | 7 |
| Australian Urban Albums (ARIA) | 1 |
| Belgian Albums (Ultratop Flanders) | 93 |
| French Albums (SNEP) | 145 |
| New Zealand Albums (RMNZ) | 13 |
| UK Albums (OCC) | 32 |
| US Billboard 200 | 13 |
| US Top R&B/Hip-Hop Albums (Billboard) | 6 |

2009 year-end chart performance for Exclusive
| Chart (2009) | Position |
|---|---|
| Australian Urban Albums (ARIA) | 25 |

== Certifications ==
Certifications for Exclusive
| Region | Certification | Certified units/sales |
|---|---|---|
| Australia (ARIA) | 2× Platinum | 140,000^{^} |
| Brazil (Pro-Música Brasil) | Gold | 30,000^{*} |
| Denmark (IFPI Danmark) | Gold | 10,000^{‡} |
| Ireland (IRMA) | 2× Platinum | 30,000^{^} |
| New Zealand (RMNZ) | 4× Platinum | 60,000^{‡} |
| United Kingdom (BPI) | Platinum | 300,000^{^} |
| United States (RIAA) | 4× Platinum | 4,000,000^{‡} |
^{*} Sales figures based on certification alone.^{^} Shipments figures based on certification alone.^{‡} Sales+streaming figures based on certification alone.
