= With You (Chris Brown song) =

2007 single by Chris Brown

Single by Chris Brown

from the album Exclusive
- Released: December 4, 2007
- Recorded: 2007
- Studio: Battery (New York City)
- Genre: R&B
- Length: 4:12
- Label: Jive; Zomba
- Songwriters: Johntá Austin; Tor Erik Hermansen; Mikkel Eriksen; Espen Lind; Amund Bjørklund
- Producer: Stargate

Chris Brown singles chronology
"Kiss Kiss" (2007)	"With You" (2007)	"Shawty Get Loose" (2008)

Music video
- "With You" on YouTube

"With You" is a song by American singer Chris Brown for his second studio album, Exclusive (2007). The song was written by Johntá Austin, Espionage, and Stargate, the latter of which produced the song. The song was released as the album's third single on December 4, 2007, in the United States. It was later released internationally on March 21, 2008. "With You" is composed as a midtempo R&B ballad that features an acoustic guitar as the base of the arrangement.

"With You" topped the charts in New Zealand and peaked inside the top five in several countries. In the United States, "With You" peaked at number two on the Billboard Hot 100 and at number one on the US Pop Songs chart. Among its certifications, the song is certified Sextuple Platinum in the US and Quadruple Platinum in Australia. The music video for "With You" was directed by Brown and Erik White. The video focuses more on Brown and his dance moves while utilizing several visual effects. It won the accolade for "Best Male Video" at the 2008 MTV Video Music Awards.

== Background and release ==
"With You" was written by Johntá Austin, Mikkel S. Eriksen, Tor Erik Hermansen, Espen Lind, and Amund Bjørklund. Eriksen and Hermansen produced the song under their production stage-name Stargate. Eriksen recorded it at Battery Studios - a recording studio in New York. Phil Tan mixed the track with assistance from Josh Houghkirk at Soapbox Studio in Atlanta, Georgia. Eriksen and Hermansen, in addition to producing and writing, performed all the instruments featured on the song, with the exception of the guitar, which was provided by Lind.

"With You" was released as the third single from Brown's second studio album Exclusive (2007), after "Wall to Wall" and "Kiss Kiss" (2007). Before its official single release, the song was first released to digital retailers in certain territories on November 2, 2007, through Zomba Recordings, as a promotional single. More than a month later, on December 4, 2007, Jive Records and Zomba Recordings serviced the song to rhythmic crossover radio in the United States. They later solicited to contemporary hit radio on January 8, 2008. On March 4, 2008, an extended play for "With You" was released to digital retailers in certain countries, including the United States, featuring the original song and two other remixes by Tracy Young and Kovas. Another extended play was released in selected countries on March 14, 2008, containing the original version and four other remixes. On March 21, 2008, "With You" was released as a digital single in several countries, including Belgium, France, Ireland and Norway. The single featured a B-side, the B&B Remix of "With You".

Speaking about the track, Brown said to MTV News: "When I heard the song for the first time, it touched me immediately. Therefore it was really easy for me to put my personal feelings and experiences inside it. I think that the secret of the track is that everyone can identify themselves with it no matter how old you are."

== Composition ==
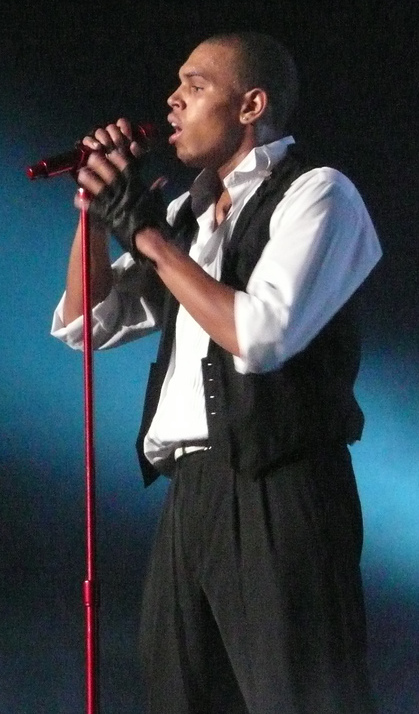
Chris Brown (pictured) collaborated with record producing team Stargate on "With You".

"With You" is a "folksy" mid-tempo R&B ballad. According to the sheet music published at Musicnotes.com by Sony/ATV Music Publishing, "With You" is set in the key of E♭ major with a moderate tempo. Brown's vocals range from E♭_{4} to B♭_{5}. The song's instrumental consists of a slow stuttering hip hop drum beat and an acoustic guitar arrangement that garnered comparisons to other Stargate produced songs for artists such as Ne-Yo, Beyoncé and Rihanna. Lyrically, "With You" is about romantic love, presented in a teenage context.

== Music video ==
The music video was shot in Los Angeles, California on November 20, 2007. It premiered on music video channels MTV, BET, and Fuse TV during the week of December 3, 2007. In a November 8, 2007, interview with MTV, Brown stated that he co-directed the video as well. "And it shows me more solo. Like, it shows the grown side of Chris – it doesn't show the kiddie side. 'Cause with this album, I wanted to blend, I wanted to do all different visuals of me. The first [video] 'Wall to Wall,' the acting, the vampires, the spookiness, then you go to 'Kiss, Kiss,' that had the little goofy part, now this one is solo, the main [performer] is me. Me freestyle dancing – just showing people me naturally, not a choreographed routine, just me dancing and showing you what I'm capable of. But at the same time, I was just having fun with the camera, and just one-on-one time with me and my audience." The video was quite popular in American television, reaching number 1 on BET's 106 & Park for 6 days, and staying on the countdown for 38 days. It has also reached number 1 on MTV's TRL for 10 days, replacing Flo Rida's "Low" and finally retired at number 1 after it stayed on the countdown for 35 days. The music video won the accolade for "Best Male Video" at the 2008 MTV Video Music Awards.

The music video on YouTube has received over 700 million views as of August 2024.

== Critical reception ==
The song received critical acclaim. Lamb of About.com awarded a four and a half star rating, praising the song's "instant warmth of the guitar-based arrangement", "Brown's romantic vocals" and as a perfect slow dance option. Lamb however disregarded its "simplistic swoony lyrics". He concluded his review, saying ""With You" helps prove that Chris Brown is not only an amazingly talented dancer, he can truly communicate to an audience vocally as well. Look for this song as a key choice at romantic events throughout 2008 and beyond." Erinn V. Westbrook of The Harvard Crimson wrote positively about the single, saying "It’s a bit sappy, but Brown comes off surprisingly genuine. If you’re like me, you may actually fall in love with the teenage vocalist." In 2022 V101.9 ranked the song at number eight among Chris Brown's best singles. The Boombox called "With You" a "defining song in [Brown's] career", stating that it displayed "how he could capture an audience with his dance and vocal skills".

Andy Kellman of Allmusic named it one of the album's highlights. Nick Levine of Digital Spy gave the song a three star rating, calling it a "pretty, folk-tinged R&B ballad" and commenting that "The lyrics won't be troubling the Ivor Novello judges any time soon ("With every kiss and every hug, you make me fall in love"), but its chorus is pretty enough to make us turn a deaf ear." Kelefa Sanneh of The New York Times commented that song borrows "brazenly" from Beyonce's 2006 single "Irreplaceable". Sal Cinquemani of Slant Magazine commented that Stargate already used the same production formula on several songs before "With You", saying that it "is in serious need of replacing". Billboard wrote favorably of the song, saying that Brown on the song is "laying impressionable lyrics over Stargate’s guitar plucks".

== Chart performance ==
"With You" debuted at number 72 on the Billboard Hot 100 in the issue dated December 15, 2007, earning the biggest debut title for the week. In the song's seventh week, it entered the top ten tier of the chart, ascending from number twelve in the previous week to number six. Three weeks later, in the issue dated February 16, 2008, "With You" peaked at number two the Billboard Hot 100, where it remained for four consecutive weeks. On March 15, 2008, the song fell to number three, but ascended to number two the succeeding week, where it remained for another week, this time blocked by Usher's "Love in This Club" featuring Young Jeezy. The song also topped the US Radio Songs and the US Pop Songs charts as well as peaking at number five on the US Hot R&B/Hip-Hop Songs chart. It was certified platinum on April 24, 2008, by the Recording Industry Association of America (RIAA) for selling one million downloads. In Canada, "With You" entered the Canadian Hot 100 as the chart's highest debut at number 70 in the issue dated January 5, 2008. Ten weeks later, the song peaked at number two, where it remained for two weeks. On March 26, 2008, it was certified gold by Music Canada for selling 20,000 ringtones.

"With You" debuted on the Australian Singles Chart at number 24 on the issue dated March 16, 2008. The song quickly ascended the chart, reaching its peak at number five in its fifth week, where it remained for two weeks. "Kiss Kiss" was later certified double platinum by the Australian Recording Industry Association (ARIA) for shipping 140,000 copies. In New Zealand, the song entered the singles chart at number 25 on the issue dated December 17, 2007. Three weeks later, the song entered the top five, ascending to number four. In the issue dated February 18, 2008, "With You" topped the New Zealand Top 40, where it remained for four weeks. It remained on the chart for a total of twenty-three weeks. The song was certified platinum on March 16, 2008, by the Recording Industry Association of New Zealand (RIANZ). "With You" debuted on the UK Singles Chart at number 100 in the issue dated February 2, 2008. It eventually peaked at number eight on the week ending April 5, 2008, and remained on the singles chart for a total of thirty-six weeks. On August 22, 2008, "With You" was certified silver by the British Phonographic Industry (BPI) for selling 200,000 copies.

== Track listings ==
Promotional single

1. "With You" – 4:14

Three-track EP

1. "With You" – 4:12
2. "With You" (Tracy Young Remix) – 6:18
3. "With You" (Kovas Ghetto Beat Extended Remix) – 5:00

European CD single

1. "With You" – 4:12
2. "Fallen Angel" – 5:33

Five-track EP

1. "With You" (Main Version) – 4:12
2. "With You" (B&B Remix) – 3:45
3. "With You" (Kardianl Beats Remix) – 3:51
4. "With You" (Tracy Young Remix) – 6:18
5. "With You" (Kovas Ghetto Beat Extended Remix) – 5:00

Digital download

1. "With You" (Main Version) – 4:12
2. "With You" (B&B Remix) – 3:45

== Credits ==
Credits are adapted from Exclusive liner notes, Jive Records, Zomba Recording.

Recording and mixing

- Recorded at Battery Studios in New York
- Mixed at Soapbox Studio in Atlanta, Georgia

Personnel

- Vocals – Chris Brown
- Songwriting – Chris Brown, Johntá Austin, Mikkel S. Eriksen, Tor Erik Hermansen, Espen Lind, Amund Bjørklund
- Production – Stargate
- Recording – Mikkel S. Eriksen
- Mixing – Phil Tan, assisted by Josh Houghkirk
- Guitar – Espen Lind
- All other instruments – Mikkel S. Eriksen, Tor Erik Hermansen
- Stargate management – Tim Blacksmith, Danny D

== Charts ==
=== Weekly charts ===
Weekly chart performance for "With You"
Chart (2008)	Peak position
Australia (ARIA)	5
Australian Urban (ARIA)	2
Austria (Ö3 Austria Top 40)	42
Belgium (Ultratip Bubbling Under Flanders)	2
Belgium (Ultratip Bubbling Under Wallonia)	4
Canada Hot 100 (Billboard)	2
Denmark (Tracklisten)	22
Europe (Eurochart Hot 100)	15
France (SNEP)	11
Germany (GfK)	33
Ireland (IRMA)	3
Netherlands (Dutch Top 40)	31
Netherlands (Single Top 100)	56
New Zealand (Recorded Music NZ)	1
Norway (VG-lista)	11
Romania (Romanian Top 100)	9
Scottish Singles Sales (Official Charts)	5
Slovakia Airplay (ČNS IFPI)	44
Sweden (Sverigetopplistan)	31
Switzerland (Schweizer Hitparade)	24
UK Singles (Official Charts)	8
UK Hip Hop/R&B (Official Charts)	3
US Billboard Hot 100	2
US Adult Contemporary (Billboard)	29
US Adult Pop Airplay (Billboard)	28
US Hot R&B/Hip-Hop Songs (Billboard)	5
US Latin Rhythm Airplay (Billboard)	14
US Pop Airplay (Billboard)	1
US Rhythmic Airplay (Billboard)	1

=== Year-end charts ===
2008 year-end chart performance for "With You"
Chart (2008)	Position
Australia (ARIA)	31
Australian Physical Singles (ARIA)	13
Australian Urban (ARIA)	10
Brazil (Crowley)	5
Canada (Canadian Hot 100)	28
Canada CHR/Top 40 (Billboard)	15
Europe (Eurochart Hot 100)	58
France (SNEP)	81
New Zealand (RIANZ)	5
Sweden (Sverigetopplistan)	96
Switzerland (Schweizer Hitparade)	85
UK Singles (OCC)	39
US Billboard Hot 100	9
US Hot R&B/Hip-Hop Songs (Billboard)	29
US Mainstream Top 40 (Billboard)	10
US Rhythmic Airplay (Billboard)	5
Worldwide (IFPI)	10

== Certifications ==
Certifications for "With You"
Region	Certification	Certified units/sales
Australia (ARIA)	4× Platinum	280,000^{‡}
Brazil (Pro-Música Brasil)	Platinum	60,000^{*}
Canada (Music Canada) (Ringtone)	Gold	20,000^{*}
Denmark (IFPI Danmark)	Platinum	90,000^{‡}
Japan (RIAJ)	Gold	100,000^{*}
New Zealand (RMNZ)	4× Platinum	120,000^{‡}
Norway (IFPI Norway)	2× Platinum	20,000^{*}
United Kingdom (BPI)	2× Platinum	1,200,000^{‡}
United States (RIAA)	6× Platinum	6,000,000^{‡}
United States (RIAA) (Mastertone)	2× Platinum	2,000,000^{*}
^{*} Sales figures based on certification alone.^{‡} Sales+streaming figures based on certification alone.

== Radio and release history ==
Country	Date	Format	Label
Austria	November 2, 2007	Promotional single	Zomba Recordings
Belgium	November 2, 2007	Promotional single	Zomba Recordings
Denmark	November 2, 2007	Promotional single	Zomba Recordings
Ireland	November 2, 2007	Promotional single	Zomba Recordings
Spain	November 2, 2007	Promotional single	Zomba Recordings
Sweden	November 2, 2007	Promotional single	Zomba Recordings
United States	December 4, 2007	Rhythmic crossover	Jive Records; Zomba Recordings
United States	January 8, 2008	Contemporary hit radio	Jive Records; Zomba Recordings
Brazil	March 4, 2008	EP	Zomba Recordings
France	March 4, 2008	EP	Zomba Recordings
Mexico	March 4, 2008	EP	Zomba Recordings
Switzerland	March 4, 2008	EP	Zomba Recordings
United States	March 4, 2008	EP	Zomba Recordings
Australia	March 14, 2008	EP	Zomba Recordings
Austria	March 14, 2008	EP	Zomba Recordings
Belgium	March 14, 2008	EP	Zomba Recordings
Finland	March 14, 2008	EP	Zomba Recordings
Germany	March 14, 2008	EP	Zomba Recordings
Netherlands	March 14, 2008	EP	Zomba Recordings
New Zealand	March 14, 2008	EP	Zomba Recordings
Switzerland	March 14, 2008	EP	Zomba Recordings
Austria	March 21, 2008	Digital download	Zomba Recordings
Belgium	March 21, 2008	Digital download	Zomba Recordings
Brazil	March 21, 2008	Digital download	Zomba Recordings
Denmark	March 21, 2008	Digital download	Zomba Recordings
Finland	March 21, 2008	Digital download	Zomba Recordings
France	March 21, 2008	Digital download	Zomba Recordings
Germany	March 21, 2008	Digital download	Zomba Recordings
Ireland	March 21, 2008	Digital download	Zomba Recordings
Italy	March 21, 2008	Digital download	Zomba Recordings
Mexico	March 21, 2008	Digital download	Zomba Recordings
Netherlands	March 21, 2008	Digital download	Zomba Recordings
Norway	March 21, 2008	Digital download	Zomba Recordings
Spain	March 21, 2008	Digital download	Zomba Recordings
Sweden	March 21, 2008	Digital download	Zomba Recordings
Switzerland	March 21, 2008	Digital download	Zomba Recordings
United Kingdom	March 21, 2008	Digital download	Zomba Recordings

== See also ==
- List of number-one singles from the 2000s (New Zealand)
- List of Billboard Rhythmic number-one songs of the 2000s
- List of Hot 100 Airplay number-one singles of the 2000s
