= List of Billboard Rhythmic number-one songs of the 2000s =

The Rhythmic chart debuted in Billboard Magazine in the issue dated October 3, 1992, as the Top 40/Rhythm-Crossover chart. Weekly rankings are "compiled from a national sample of airplay" as measured by Nielsen BDS monitoring rhythmic radio stations continuously.

At the start of the 2000s decade, the chart was called the Rhythmic Top 40 and was published in Airplay Monitor and online, available only to subscribers to Billboard. The chart returned to the print edition of Billboard Magazine in its August 2, 2003, issue. It was renamed to Rhythmic Airplay with the issue dated February 7, 2004. Since July 12, 2008, the chart has been called Rhythmic.

Below are the songs that reached number one on the chart beginning with the first new song to reach number one in 2000 through the end of 2009 in chronological order. The song to spend the most weeks at number one during the decade was "Lollipop" by Lil Wayne and featuring Static Major with a 12-week run.

== Number-one rhythmic hits of the 2000s ==
†	Number-one rhythmic song of the year

Issue date	Song	Artist(s)	Weeks at number one	Ref.
2000
December 4, 1999	"Bring It All to Me"	Blaque	6	
January 22	"What a Girl Wants"	Christina Aguilera	4	
February 19	"Say My Name"	Destiny's Child	7	
April 8	"Thong Song"	Sisqo	8	
June 3	"Try Again"	Aaliyah	1	
June 10	"The Real Slim Shady"	Eminem	5	
July 15	"Try Again"	Aaliyah	2	
July 29	"Big Pimpin'"	Jay-Z featuring UGK	1	
August 5	"Country Grammar (Hot S**t) (radio version)"	Nelly	10	
October 14	"Most Girls"	Pink	1	
October 21	"Case of the Ex"	Mýa	4	
November 18	"Independent Women Part I"	Destiny's Child	4	
December 16	"It Wasn't Me"	Shaggy featuring Ricardo "RikRok" Ducent	3	
2001
January 6	"Ms. Jackson"	OutKast	5	
February 10	"Angel"	Shaggy featuring Rayvon	3	
March 3	"Put It on Me"	Ja Rule featuring Lil' Mo & Vita	4	
March 31	"Ride wit Me"	Nelly featuring City Spud	6	
May 12	"Survivor"	Destiny's Child	2	
May 26	"Lady Marmalade"	Christina Aguilera, Pink, Mýa, Lil' Kim	5	
June 30	"Let Me Blow Ya Mind"	Eve featuring Gwen Stefani	1	
July 7	"Peaches & Cream"	112	6	
August 18	"I'm Real"	Jennifer Lopez	3	
September 8	"I'm Real" (Murder Inc. Remix)	Jennifer Lopez featuring Ja Rule	7	
October 27	"Family Affair"	Mary J. Blige	4	
November 24	"U Got It Bad"	Usher	9	
2002
January 26	"Always on Time"	Ja Rule featuring Ashanti	6	
March 9	"Ain't It Funny (Murder Remix)"	Jennifer Lopez featuring Ja Rule	2	
March 23	"What's Luv"	Fat Joe featuring Ashanti	4	
April 20	"Foolish"	Ashanti	8	
June 15	"Without Me"	Eminem	1	
June 22	"Hot in Herre"	Nelly	7	
August 10	"I Need a Girl (Part Two)"	P. Diddy & Ginuwine featuring Loon, Mario Winans and Tammi Ruggeri	1	
August 17	"Dilemma"	Nelly featuring Kelly Rowland	11	
November 2	"Work It"	Missy Elliott	3	
November 23	"Lose Yourself"	Eminem	6	
2003
January 4	"'03 Bonnie & Clyde"	Jay-Z & Beyoncé	3	
January 25	"Bump, Bump, Bump"	B2K featuring P. Diddy	3	
February 15	"All I Have"	Jennifer Lopez featuring LL Cool J	2	
March 1	"In da Club"	50 Cent	9	
May 3	"Ignition"	R. Kelly	1	
May 10	"Get Busy"	Sean Paul	1	
May 17	"Can't Let You Go"	Fabolous featuring Mike Shorey and Lil' Mo	1	
May 24	"21 Questions"	50 Cent featuring Nate Dogg	4	
June 21	"Magic Stick"	Lil' Kim & 50 Cent	5	
July 26	"Right Thurr"†	Chingy	2	
August 9	"Crazy in Love"	Beyoncé featuring Jay-Z	1	
August 16	"Right Thurr"	Chingy	5	
September 20	"Shake Ya Tailfeather"	Nelly, P. Diddy and Murphy Lee	1	
September 27	"Baby Boy"	Beyoncé featuring Sean Paul	7	
November 15	"Holidae In"	Chingy featuring Ludacris & Snoop Dogg	1	
November 22	"Stand Up"	Ludacris featuring Shawnna	4	
December 20	"Hey Ya!"	OutKast	1	
December 27	"Milkshake"	Kelis	5	
2004
January 31	"Slow Jamz"	Twista featuring Kanye West and Jamie Foxx	3	
February 21	"Yeah!"†	Usher featuring Lil Jon and Ludacris	10	
May 1	"I Don't Wanna Know"	Mario Winans featuring Enya and P. Diddy	1	
May 8	"My Band"	D12	2	
May 22	"Naughty Girl"	Beyoncé Knowles	1	
May 29	"Burn"	Usher	4	
June 26	"Confessions Part II"	Usher	3	
July 17	"Slow Motion"	Juvenile featuring Soulja Slim	5	
August 21	"Sunshine"	Lil' Flip featuring Lea	1	
August 28	"Lean Back"	Terror Squad	1	
September 4	"Goodies"	Ciara featuring Petey Pablo	7	
October 23	"My Boo"	Usher and Alicia Keys	4	
November 20	"Over and Over"	Nelly featuring Tim McGraw	1	
November 27	"Drop It Like It's Hot"	Snoop Dogg featuring Pharrell	5	
2005
January 1	"Let Me Love You"	Mario	7	
February 19	"Disco Inferno"	50 Cent	1	
February 26	"Lovers and Friends"	Lil Jon & The East Side Boyz featuring Usher and Ludacris	1	
March 5	"How We Do"	The Game featuring 50 Cent	1	
March 12	"Candy Shop"	50 Cent featuring Olivia	8	
May 7	"Hate It or Love It"	The Game featuring 50 Cent	2	
May 21	"Oh"	Ciara featuring Ludacris	2	
June 4	"We Belong Together" †	Mariah Carey	10	
August 13	"Let Me Hold You"	Bow Wow featuring Omarion	5	
September 17	"Shake It Off"	Mariah Carey	2	
October 1	"Like You"	Bow Wow featuring Ciara	1	
October 8	"Gold Digger"	Kanye West featuring Jamie Foxx	6	
November 19	"Run It!"	Chris Brown featuring Juelz Santana	7	
2006
January 7	"Grillz"	Nelly featuring Paul Wall, Ali & Gipp	7	
February 25	"So Sick"	Ne-Yo	1	
March 4	"Check on It"	Beyoncé featuring Slim Thug	1	
March 11	"Be Without You"	Mary J. Blige	4	
April 8	"Lean wit It, Rock wit It"	Dem Franchize Boyz featuring Lil Peanut & Charlay	3	
April 29	"Ridin'"	Chamillionaire featuring Krayzie Bone	6	
June 10	"So What"	Field Mob featuring Ciara	2	
June 24	"Snap Yo Fingers"	Lil Jon featuring E-40 and Sean Paul of the YoungBloodz	1	
July 1	"It's Goin' Down"	Yung Joc	4	
July 29	"Me & U"†	Cassie	6	
September 9	"Pullin' Me Back"	Chingy featuring Tyrese	4	
October 7	"I Know You See It"	Yung Joc featuring Brandy "Ms B" Hambrick	1	
October 14	"Money Maker"	Ludacris featuring Pharrell	5	
November 18	"I Wanna Love You"	Akon featuring Snoop Dogg	4	
December 16	"Smack That"	Akon featuring Eminem	2	
December 30	"Irreplaceable"	Beyoncé	7	
2007
February 17	"You"	Lloyd featuring Lil Wayne	4	
March 17	"This Is Why I'm Hot"	Mims	3	
April 7	"Don't Matter"	Akon	4	
May 5	"Buy U a Drank (Shawty Snappin')"†	T-Pain featuring Yung Joc	9	
July 7	"Party Like a Rockstar"	Shop Boyz	2	
July 21	"Beautiful Girls"	Sean Kingston	3	
August 11	"Bartender"	T-Pain featuring Akon	2	
August 25	"Make Me Better"	Fabolous featuring Ne-Yo	3	
September 15	"Shawty"	Plies featuring T-Pain	2	
September 29	"Crank That (Soulja Boy)"	Soulja Boy Tell 'Em	7	
November 17	"Kiss Kiss"	Chris Brown featuring T-Pain	5	
December 22	"No One"	Alicia Keys	1	
December 29	"Low"† (2008)	Flo Rida featuring T-Pain	9	
2008
March 1	"With You"	Chris Brown	6	
April 12	"Love in This Club"	Usher featuring Young Jeezy	1	
April 19	"Sexy Can I"	Ray J & Young Berg	3	
May 10	"Lollipop"	Lil Wayne featuring Static Major	12	
August 2	"Get Like Me"	David Banner featuring Chris Brown & Yung Joc	2	
August 16	"I Luv Your Girl"	The-Dream	2	
August 30	"A Milli"	Lil Wayne	1	
September 6	"Dangerous"	Kardinal Offishall featuring Akon	2	
September 20	"Got Money"	Lil Wayne featuring T-Pain	2	
October 4	"Whatever You Like"	T.I.	8	
November 29	"Live Your Life"	T.I. featuring Rihanna	9	
2009
January 31	"Heartless"	Kanye West	5	
March 7	"Dead and Gone"	T.I. featuring Justin Timberlake	4	
April 4	"Kiss Me Thru the Phone"	Soulja Boy Tell 'Em featuring Sammie	2	
April 18	"Blame It"	Jamie Foxx featuring T-Pain	5	
May 23	"Day 'n' Nite"	Kid Cudi	1	
May 30	"Boom Boom Pow"	The Black Eyed Peas	3	
June 20	"Knock You Down"	Keri Hilson featuring Kanye West & Ne-Yo	2	
July 4	"Birthday Sex"	Jeremih	1	
July 11	"Knock You Down"	Keri Hilson featuring Kanye West & Ne-Yo	1	
July 18	"Best I Ever Had"†	Drake	10	
September 26	"Down"	Jay Sean featuring Lil Wayne	3	
October 17	"Run This Town"	Jay-Z featuring Rihanna and Kanye West	4	
November 14	"Whatcha Say"	Jason Derulo	2	
November 28	"Sweet Dreams"	Beyoncé	1	
December 5	"Empire State of Mind"	Jay-Z and Alicia Keys	7	

== See also ==
- 2000s in music
- List of Billboard Hot 100 number-one singles of the 2000s
- List of artists who reached number one on the U.S. Rhythmic chart
