= Take You Down (Chris Brown song) =

Single by Chris Brown

from the album Exclusive
- Released: April 6, 2008
- Studio: The Underlab (Los Angeles, California)
- Genre: R&B
- Length: 4:05
- Label: Jive, Zomba
- Songwriters: Chris Brown; Harvey Mason, Jr.; Damon Thomas; Steve Russell; James Fauntleroy; Lamar Edwards
- Producers: The Underdogs; Edwards

Chris Brown singles chronology
"Get Like Me" (2008)	"Take You Down" (2008)	"Forever" (2008)

Music video
- "Take You Down" on YouTube

"Take You Down" is a song recorded by American singer Chris Brown for his second studio album, Exclusive (2007). The song was written by Brown, Harvey Mason, Jr., Damon Thomas, Steve Russell, James Fauntleroy and Lamar Edwards, while production was helmed by Edwards and The Underdogs. The song was released as the album's fourth single on April 6, 2008 in the United States. "Take You Down" is composed as slow R&B ballad with the lyrics based on sexual intercourse. The song garnered Brown a Grammy nomination in the category Best Male R&B Vocal Performance.

"Take You Down" received mixed reviews from contemporary music critics; some noted it as one of the album's highlights while others deemed it of lesser quality of similar R&B songs. "Take You Down" performed moderately in the United States, reaching number 43 on the Billboard Hot 100. It also peaked at number seven in New Zealand and in the lower region of the UK Singles Chart. The music video for "Take You Down" is a recorded concert performance of Brown on tour.

== Background ==
"Take You Down" was written by Brown, Harvey Mason, Jr., Damon Thomas, Steve Russell, James Fauntleroy and Lamar Edwards. Mason and Thomas produced the song under their production stage-name The Underdogs together with Edwards. Aaron Renner and Riley Mackin recorded it at The Underlab - a recording studio in Los Angeles, California, while being assisted Dabling "Hobby Boy" Harward and Ruben Rivera. The song was also mixed there by The Underdogs. "Take You Down" was released as the fourth single from Brown's second studio album Exclusive (2007). On April 6, 2008, Jive Records and Zomba Recordings serviced the song to urban radios in the United States.

== Composition ==
"Take You Down" is an R&B slow jam that incorporates elements of urban music and the use of an electric guitar riff. According to the music sheet published at Musicnotes.com by EMI Music Publishing, the song moves through a moderately slow groove and has a metronome of 64 beats per minute. It is written in a key of B minor while Brown's vocals range from E_{4} to B_{5}. The song follows a basic sequence of Bm7-F#m7-Gmaj7-Em7 as its chord progression. The lyrical content of "Take You Down" explores sexual themes.

== Promotion ==
The music video for "Take You Down" was directed by Harvey White. It premiered on BET's 106 & Park on April 2, 2008. It was later released to iTunes on April 7, 2008. The video was taken from Chris Brown's 2007 and 2008 Up Close and Personal Holiday Exclusive Tour in Nashville at Sommet Center. It features Brown and two backup dancers, all dressed in black, performing sexual dance moves while on a revolving stage. "Take You Down" was included on the setlist of Brown's Up Close and Personal Tour and F.A.M.E. Tour.

== Critical reception ==
Andy Kellman of AllMusic named "Take You Down" one of the album's highlights. Nick Levine of Digital Spy gave the song a two star rating, calling it a "fairly unremarkable R&B slow jam" while commenting that "The only excitement comes in guessing whether the semi-titillating lyrics offer any clues about Brown and Rihanna's bedroom antics." Sal Cinquemani of Slant Magazine linked "Take You Down" to musical compositions by American singer-songwriter Prince, commenting that they "lack the provocative, industrious quality that made him more than simply a good musician and producer." Allison Stewart of The Washington Post wrote about the song's lyrical content, noting it as "one of many examples of junior varsity horn-dogging." Jason King of Vibe said that on "Take You Down", "Brown excels as a streetwise lothario." At the 51st Grammy Awards, "Take You Down" was nominated for the Best Male R&B Vocal Performance award, but lost to Ne-Yo's "Miss Independent" from his 2008 album, Year of the Gentleman.

== Chart performance ==
"Take You Down" performed moderately on the Billboard Hot 100. It debuted on the chart at number 99 in the issue dated May 3, 2008. Seven weeks later, in the issue dated June 14, 2008, it peaked at number 43 on the chart. "Take You Down" spent a total of twenty weeks on the Billboard Hot 100. The song also chart on the US R&B/Hip-Hop Songs chart, peaking at number four. "Take You Down" charted better on the New Zealand Top 40, peaking at number seven in the issue dated August 18, 2008. In the United Kingdom, the song debuted at number 92 in the issue dated January 24, 2009, where it spent just one week.

== Credits ==
- Lead Vocals - Chris Brown
- Songwriting - Chris Brown, Harvey Mason, Jr., Damon Thomas, Steve Russell, James Fauntleroy and Lamar Edwards
- Production - The Underdogs, Lamar Edwards
- Recording - Aaron Renner, Riley Mackin, assisted by Dabling "Hobby Boy" Harward and Ruben Rivera
- Mixing - The Underdogs
- Recorded and mixed at The Underlab in Los Angeles, California

Credits adapted from Exclusive liner notes, Jive Records, Zomba Recording.

== Charts ==
=== Weekly charts ===
Weekly chart performance for "Take You Down"
Chart (2008)	Peak position
New Zealand (Recorded Music NZ)	7
UK Singles (Official Charts)	92
UK Hip Hop/R&B (Official Charts)	30
US Billboard Hot 100	43
US Adult R&B Songs (Billboard)	30
US Hot R&B/Hip-Hop Songs (Billboard)	4
US Rhythmic Airplay (Billboard)	29

=== Year-end charts ===
Year-end chart performance for "Take You Down'"
Chart (2008)	Position
US Hot R&B/Hip-Hop Songs (Billboard)	13

== Certifications ==
Certifications for "Take You Down"
Region	Certification	Certified units/sales
New Zealand (RMNZ)	Platinum	30,000^{‡}
United Kingdom (BPI)	Silver	200,000^{‡}
United States (RIAA)	2× Platinum	2,000,000^{‡}
^{‡} Sales+streaming figures based on certification alone.
