= Dreamer (Chris Brown song) =

Single by Chris Brown

from the album AT&T Team USA Soundtrack
- A-side: "Superhuman"
- Released: August 7, 2008
- Genre: R&B
- Length: 3:33
- Label: Jive; Zomba
- Songwriters: Chris Brown; Robert Allen
- Producer: Troy "R8DIO" Johnson

Chris Brown singles chronology
"Forever" (2008)	"Dreamer" (2008)	"What Them Girls Like" (2008)

Audio video
- "Dreamer" on YouTube

"Dreamer" is a song by American R&B singer Chris Brown produced by Troy "R8DIO" Johnson. It is one of the songs featured on the AT&T Team USA Soundtrack. This song was made for 2008 Beijing Olympics and it samples "The Reason" by British R&B singer Lemar.

The song was released as a single on August 7, 2008, on iTunes and has reached number 16 on the Billboard Hot 100.

In New Zealand, the song debuted at number thirty-five on December 29, 2008.

== Track listing ==
UK and Ireland CD single

1. "Superhuman" (featuring Keri Hilson)
2. "Dreamer"

== Charts ==
Chart (2008–09)	Peak position
New Zealand (Recorded Music NZ)	26
US Billboard Hot 100	16
