= What Them Girls Like =

Single by Ludacris featuring Chris Brown and Sean Garrett

from the album Theater of the Mind
- Released: August 7, 2008
- Genre: Hip-hop
- Length: 3:59
- Label: Disturbing tha Peace; Def Jam
- Songwriters: Christopher Bridges; Rodney Jerkins; Garrett Hamler
- Producers: Rodney Jerkins; Sean Garrett

Ludacris singles chronology
"Pretty Girl" (2008)	"What Them Girls Like" (2008)	"Still Standing" (2008)

Chris Brown singles chronology
"Dreamer" (2008)	"What Them Girls Like" (2008)	"Make the World Go Round" (2008)

Sean Garrett singles chronology
"Grippin'" (2008)	"What Them Girls Like" (2008)	"Away" (2008)

"What Them Girls Like" is the first single from American rapper Ludacris' seventh studio album Theater of the Mind. The single features American singers Chris Brown and Sean Garrett, who produced the song alongside Rodney Jerkins.

== Critical reception ==
AllMusic editor David Jeffries called this song "completely unsurprising, with a rock-solid hook." Ken Copabianco described the song: "His sex talk is good-natured and slyly insightful about love". XXL wrote a mixed review: "Elsewhere, he’s just straight reaching—“What Them Girls Like,” for instance, where, despite taking a cue from 2000’s Mel Gibson chick flick What Women Want, there’s no real solid connection established between the film and the actual song."

== Music video ==
The music video premiered on Yahoo Music on September 11. The video takes cues from the film What Women Want. The music video premiered on BET and later appeared at number 80 on the Notarized: Top 100 Videos of 2008 countdown. Comfort Fedoke, DeRay Davis, Tyrese Gibson, Teairra Mari, Kristia Krueger, Suelyn Medeiros, Amber Rose, Joe and Gavin Maloof, and La La Anthony made cameo appearances in the video. There is a 40-second intro before the music starts in the video.

== Charts ==
=== Weekly charts ===
Chart (2008)	Peak position
Australia (ARIA)	98
Canada Hot 100 (Billboard)	53
US Billboard Hot 100	33
US Pop 100 (Billboard)	52
US Hot R&B/Hip-Hop Songs (Billboard)	17
US Hot Rap Songs (Billboard)	8
US Rhythmic Airplay (Billboard)	15

=== Year-end charts ===
Chart (2008)	Position
US Hot R&B/Hip-Hop Songs (Billboard)	90

== Certifications ==
Region	Certification	Certified units/sales
United States (RIAA)	Gold	500,000^{‡}
^{‡} Sales+streaming figures based on certification alone.
