= Kiss Kiss (Chris Brown song) =

Single by Chris Brown featuring T-Pain

from the album Exclusive
- Released: September 10, 2007
- Studio: Chalice Recording Studios (Los Angeles)
- Genre: Hip-hop; R&B; pop rap
- Length: 4:10
- Label: Jive; Zomba
- Songwriters: Chris Brown; Faheem Najm
- Producer: T-Pain

Chris Brown singles chronology
"Wall to Wall" (2007)	"Kiss Kiss" (2007)	"With You" (2007)

T-Pain singles chronology
"I'm So Hood" (2007)	"Kiss Kiss" (2007)	"Good Life" (2007)

Music video
- "Kiss Kiss" on YouTube

"Kiss Kiss" is a song by American singer Chris Brown featuring fellow American singer and rapper T-Pain. Written by the two and produced by the latter, the song was released worldwide as the second single from the former's second studio album Exclusive on September 10, 2007. It was later solicited to rhythm crossover radios in the United States on September 11, 2007. "Kiss Kiss" is an upbeat record that incorporates elements of R&B, hip-hop and dance music. The song's lyrics are about getting a woman's attention.

"Kiss Kiss" topped the charts in New Zealand and the United States, becoming Brown's second number one single in both countries. It also peaked inside the top ten in Canada and Australia and later earned platinum certifications there. The single, however failed to garner similar success in the European territories, peaking outside the top twenty in Ireland and the United Kingdom and below the top fifty in Sweden and Switzerland.

The music video for "Kiss Kiss" was directed by Brown and Erik White, who directed the music video for his last number one single "Run It!". The video features Brown in personas – a nerd and a jock – and several dance sequences. It earned a nomination at the 2008 MTV Video Music Awards for "Best Choreography". It was nominated for several other accolades at the 2008 BET Awards and the 50th Annual Grammy Awards. The song's official remix features American rapper Nelly.

== Background and production ==
"Kiss Kiss" was released as the second single from Brown's second studio album Exclusive (2007), after the moderately successful "Wall to Wall" (2007). The song was released to digital retailers worldwide on September 10, 2007, through Zomba Recordings. A day later, on September 11, 2007, Jive Records and Zomba Recordings serviced the song to rhythmic crossover radio in the United States. It was later solicited to contemporary hit radio on October 16, 2007.

"Kiss Kiss" was written by Chris Brown and T-Pain, and produced by the latter. In an interview with Shaheem Reed from MTV News, Brown stated that the first version, which he intended to make a little more adult, was rejected. He said the original line, " She's chunky, chunky/ She's thick, thick" was changed to "She wants that lovey dovey/ That kiss, kiss/ In her mind, she fantasize about getting with me/ 'Cause they hating on me/ They wanna dis, dis, but she's mine, so fine/ And thick as can be" to keep the song "PG-13". The song was recorded at Chalice Recording Studio – a recording studio in Los Angeles, California – by Brian Sumner. Fabian Marasciullo mixed the track with assistance from Chad Jolley at Hit Factory Criteria in Miami, Florida. A remix featuring Nelly in addition to T-Pain was released in November 7.

== Composition ==
Musically, "Kiss Kiss" mixes elements of hip-hop, R&B and dance, featuring a bouncy drum beat. According to the music sheet published at Musicnotes.com by Universal Music Publishing Group, the song utilizes styles of urban and R&B music and has a moderate hip-hop tempo of 140 beats per minute. It is written in a key of E♭ minor while Brown's vocals range from B_{4} to B_{5}. Brown's vocals are Auto-Tuned on some parts of the record. T-Pain performs the song's introduction, backup vocals throughout the track, and a "brief, energized rap verse". Stereogum defined it as a "piece of melodic pop-rap". Lyrically, "Kiss Kiss" is about getting a woman's attention. Nick Levine of Digital Spy said the song features braggadocio, citing the lyric "I got paper girl, the Lamborghini - with the spider seats, you never seen it" as an example.

== Critical reception ==
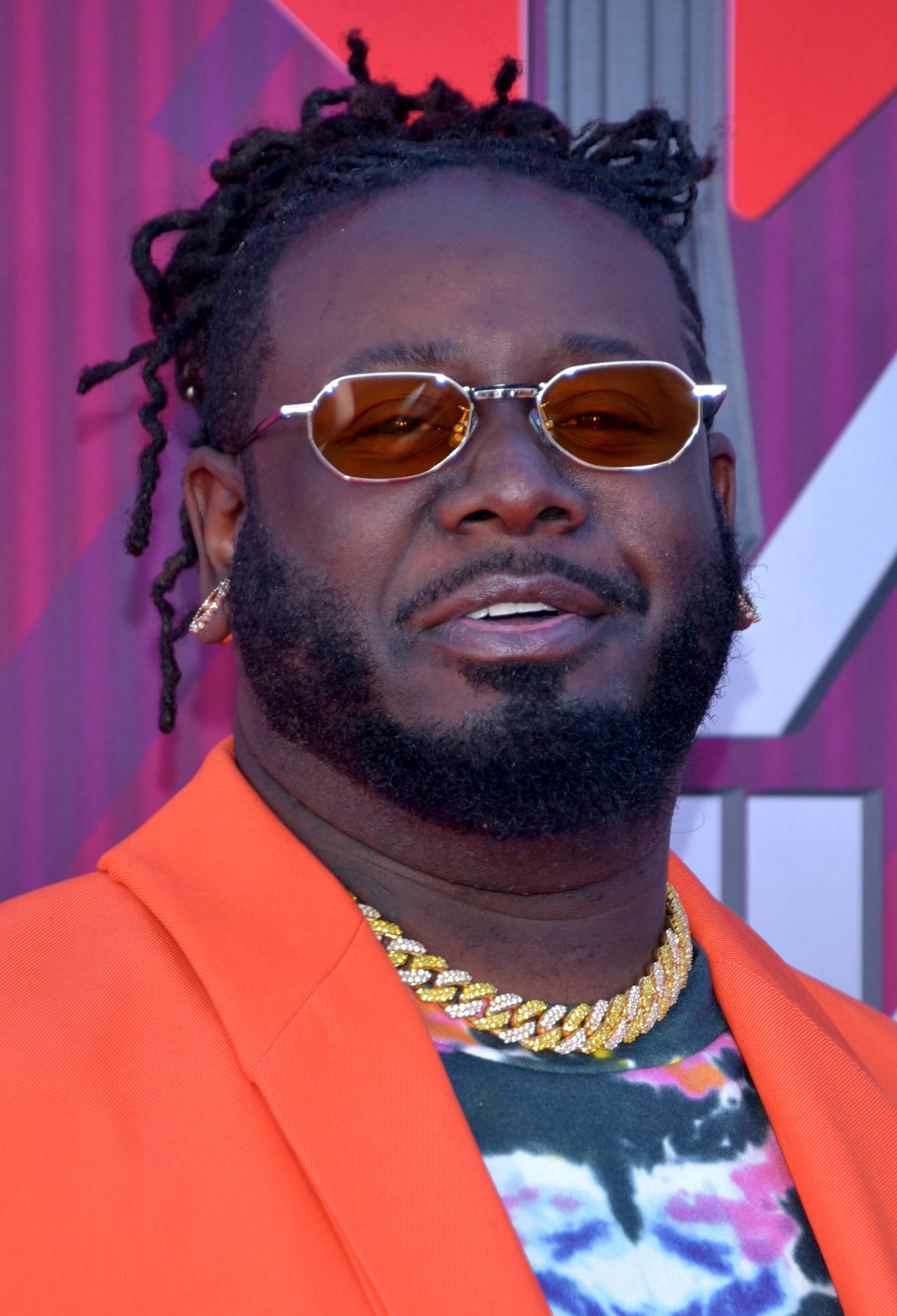
Critics praised T-Pain for his production work on "Kiss Kiss".

Mark Edward Nero, also a writer for Digital Spy, praised the song as a "fun, infectuous [sic] collaboration" but cited T-Pain's "elementary school-level" rap verses as its weak point. Nero, however, accredited T-Pain as a good producer, in reference to the song. Erinn V. Westbrook of The Harvard Crimson expressed approval of the song, asking the question "Who can resist a bouncy beat–or Nappy Boy, for that matter?" Andy Kellman of AllMusic named it one of the album's highlights, commenting that Brown could get away with the lyric "And I get a little mannish, and you see the bandanna hangin'/That means I'm like a bandit." Jorge Castillo of Yale Daily News called the song catchy and wrote that it was the epitome of Exclusive's "star-studded supporting cast of performers and producers". Nick Levine of Digital Spy gave the song a two star rating, calling it a "fairly lacklustre late-noughties R&B track" and commenting that "It's safe to presume he saves his best chat-up lines for Rihanna."

=== Accolades ===
"Kiss Kiss" received a nomination for Best Rap/Sung Collaboration at the 50th Grammy Awards, held at the Staples Center in Los Angeles, California on February 10, 2008. It lost to Fergie's 2007 single Glamorous. At the 2008 BET Awards, "Kiss Kiss" got a nomination for Best Collaboration, but lost to The-Dream's 2007 song "Falsetto". The song was also nominated for Viewer's Choice, but lost to Young Jeezy's 2008 single "Put On". The song is listed number three on the 100 Best Songs of 2007, published by the music magazine Rolling Stone.

== Chart performance ==
"Kiss Kiss" debuted at number 100 on the US Billboard Hot 100 in the issue dated September 29, 2007. In the song's sixth week on the chart, it ascended to number two, rising from number 22, following a surge in digital downloads, totaling 159,000 for that week. One week later, in the issue dated November 10, 2007, "Kiss Kiss" topped the Billboard Hot 100 while earning the biggest airplay and digital sales gainer and ending the seven-week streak held by Soulja Boy's "Crank That (Soulja Boy)". The song remained atop the Hot 100 for three consecutive weeks and earned the airplay gainer title during that period. The song also peaked at number two on the US Radio Songs and at number four on the US Pop Songs charts. As of April 2014, the single has sold 3,117,000 copies in the US. On August 23, 2019, the single was certified quadruple platinum by the Recording Industry Association of America (RIAA) for sales of over four million copies in the United States.

In Canada, "Kiss Kiss" entered the Canadian Hot 100 at number 70 in the issue dated November 3, 2007. Eight weeks later, the song peaked at number six. On April 21, 2008, it was certified double platinum by Music Canada for selling 80,000 ringtones. "Kiss Kiss" debuted on the Australian Singles Chart at number 36 on the issue dated November 25, 2007. The song slowly ascended the chart for fifteen weeks until the issue dated March 9, 2008, when it peaked at number eight. "Kiss Kiss" was later certified platinum by the Australian Recording Industry Association (ARIA) for shipping 70,000 copies. In New Zealand, the song entered the singles chart at number twenty on the issue dated September 24, 2007. In the following week, the song rose to number four, earning the greatest gainer title. It rose to number one in the next week, where it remained for three weeks. The song was certified platinum on December 16, 2007, by the Recording Industry Association of New Zealand (RIANZ). "Kiss Kiss" debuted on the UK Singles Chart at number 40 in the issue dated November 3, 2007. Two weeks later, the song rose to number 38. It left the singles chart after seventeen weeks.

== Music video ==
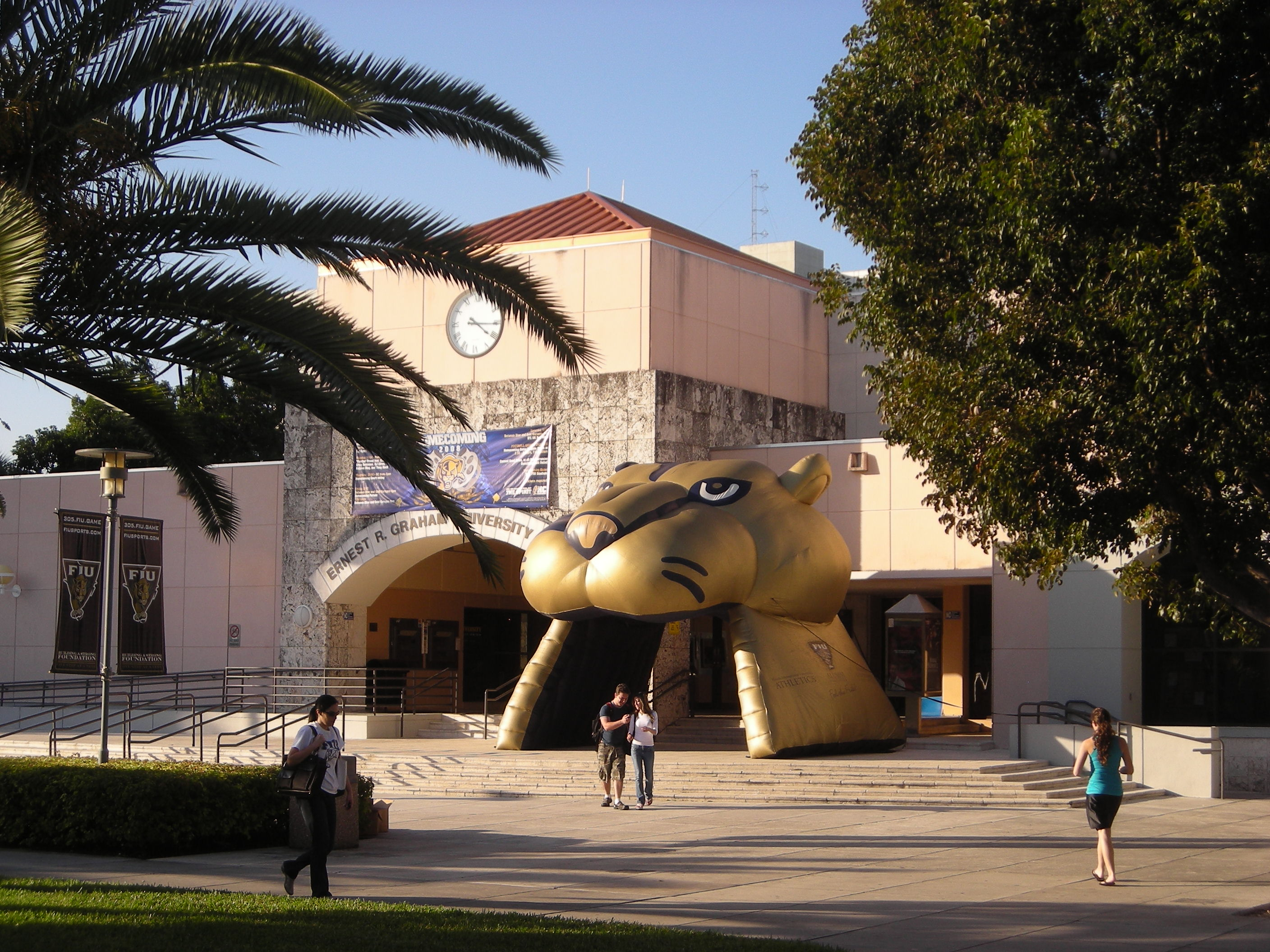
The Graham Center at the Florida International University was used as a filming location.

The music video for "Kiss Kiss" was shot at Florida International University's University Park campus, in Miami, Florida. It was directed by Brown and frequent collaborator Erik White. Singer K. Michelle makes a cameo in the video. " Kiss Kiss" premiered on MTV TRL on August 30, 2007. It received a nomination at the 2008 MTV Video Music Awards for"Best Choreography, but lost to Gnarls Barkley's "Run". In 2007, it was voted first on MTV's 27 Essential R&B Songs of 2007.

In the video, Brown plays two different versions of himself, a nerd and a jock, both trying to get the attention of a pretty girl who also attends the college. The jock side of Brown is constantly picking on the nerdy Brown around the girl, thinking it will impress her, whereas the nerdy Brown is always being nice to her. In one scene of the video the jock Brown is playing football in a field by the school, while the nerdy Brown is attempting to talk to the girl. The jock Brown seeing this runs and tackles the nerdy Brown to the ground. At the end of the video the two Browns are standing in front of their cars in the parking lot. The girl comes up, passes the jock Brown and kisses the nerdy Brown and proceeds to get in his vehicle, while the jock looks on, bewildered.

== Personnel ==
Credits adapted from Exclusive liner notes.

- Chris Brown – songwriting, vocals
- T-Pain – songwriting, production, vocals
- Brian Sumner – recording engineer
- Fabian Marasciullo – mix engineer
- Chad Jolley – assistant mix engineer
- Herb Powers, Jr. – mastering engineer
- Recorded at Chalice Recording Studios in Los Angeles, California
- Mixed at Hit Factory Criteria in Miami, Florida.

== Charts ==
=== Weekly charts ===
Weekly chart performance for "Kiss Kiss"
Chart (2007–2008)	Peak position
Australia (ARIA)	8
Australian Urban (ARIA)	4
Canada Hot 100 (Billboard)	6
Ireland (IRMA)	26
New Zealand (Recorded Music NZ)	1
Romania (Romanian Top 100)	79
Scottish Singles Sales (Official Charts)	21
Sweden (Sverigetopplistan)	58
Switzerland (Schweizer Hitparade)	69
UK Singles (Official Charts)	38
UK Hip Hop/R&B (Official Charts)	2
US Billboard Hot 100	1
US Hot R&B/Hip-Hop Songs (Billboard)	2
US Latin Rhythm Airplay (Billboard)	23
US Pop Airplay (Billboard)	4
US Rhythmic Airplay (Billboard)	1

=== Year-end charts ===
2007 year-end chart performance for "Kiss Kiss"
Chart (2007)	Position
New Zealand (RIANZ)	17
UK Urban (Music Week)	29
US Billboard Hot 100	93
US Hot R&B/Hip-Hop Songs (Billboard)	62

2008 year-end chart performance for "Kiss Kiss"
Chart (2008)	Position
Australia (ARIA)	49
Brazil (Crowley)	7
Canada (Canadian Hot 100)	47
UK Singles (OCC)	176
US Billboard Hot 100	19
US Hot R&B/Hip-Hop Songs (Billboard)	45
US Mainstream Top 40 (Billboard)	30
US Rhythmic Airplay (Billboard)	20

=== Decade-end charts ===
Decade-end chart performance for "Kiss Kiss"
Chart (2000–2009)	Rank
US Billboard Hot 100	93

== Certifications ==
Certifications for "Kiss Kiss"
Region	Certification	Certified units/sales
Australia (ARIA)	3× Platinum	210,000^{‡}
Brazil (Pro-Música Brasil)	Platinum	60,000^{*}
Canada (Music Canada) (Ringtone)	2× Platinum	80,000^{*}
New Zealand (RMNZ)	3× Platinum	90,000^{‡}
Norway (IFPI Norway)	Gold	5,000^{*}
United Kingdom (BPI) Nelly Remix	Gold	400,000^{‡}
United States (RIAA)	6× Platinum	6,000,000^{‡}
United States (RIAA) (Mastertone)	Platinum	1,000,000^{*}
^{*} Sales figures based on certification alone.^{‡} Sales+streaming figures based on certification alone.

== Radio and release history ==
Release dates and formats for "Kiss Kiss"
Country	Date	Format	Label
Various	September 10, 2007	Digital download	Zomba Recording
United States	September 11, 2007	Rhythmic crossover	Jive Records; Zomba Recordings
Sweden	October 15, 2007	Digital download	Zomba Recordings
United States	October 16, 2007	Contemporary hit radio	Jive Records; Zomba Recordings
New Zealand	December 8, 2007	Digital download	Zomba Recordings
Ireland	September 12, 2008	Digital download	Zomba Recordings
Switzerland	September 12, 2008	Digital download	Zomba Recordings
Denmark	February 10, 2010	FP Remix	Zomba Recordings
Germany	February 10, 2010	FP Remix	Zomba Recordings
Italy	February 10, 2010	FP Remix	Zomba Recordings
Mexico	February 10, 2010	FP Remix	Zomba Recordings
Netherlands	February 10, 2010	FP Remix	Zomba Recordings
Norway	February 10, 2010	FP Remix	Zomba Recordings
Spain	February 10, 2010	FP Remix	Zomba Recordings
Sweden	February 10, 2010	FP Remix	Zomba Recordings
Switzerland	February 10, 2010	FP Remix	Zomba Recordings

== See also ==
- List of Hot 100 number-one singles of 2007 (U.S.)
- List of Billboard Rhythmic number-one songs of the 2000s
- List of number-one singles from the 2000s (New Zealand)
