= Wall to Wall (song) =

Single by Chris Brown

from the album Exclusive
- Released: May 29, 2007
- Genre: R&B; hip hop
- Length: 3:43
- Label: Jive; Zomba
- Songwriters: Sean Garrett; Walter Scott
- Producers: Sean Garrett; Great Scott

Chris Brown singles chronology
"Poppin'" (2006)	"Wall to Wall" (2007)	"Kiss Kiss" (2007)

Music video
- "Wall to Wall" on YouTube

"Wall to Wall" is a song recorded by American singer Chris Brown for his second studio album, Exclusive (2007). It was written and produced by Sean Garrett and Walter "Great" Scott. Selected as the album's lead single, "Wall to Wall" was first released to urban rhythmic radios on May 29, 2007. The song received critical praise from contemporary music critics; many of them called the song a potential hit single and one of the album's best tracks.

"Wall to Wall" failed to attain major chart success on the US Billboard Hot 100, peaking at number 79, but peaked inside the top thirty in Australia and New Zealand while also reaching the lower end of the charts in European countries. The music video for "Wall to Wall" was inspired by Michael Jackson's "Thriller" and the 1998 film Blade. A remix of the song, featuring American rapper Jadakiss, was accompanied with another version of the music video.

== Background and composition ==
"Wall to Wall" was written by Brown, Sean Garrett and Walter Scott, and produced by Sean Garrett and Walter Scott; the latter, however, is credited as the co-producer. Carlton Lynn recorded the song's vocals at Silent Sound Studios - a recording studio in Atlanta, Georgia. The song was mixed at Chung King Studios in New York City, New York by Brian Stanley with assistance from Anthony Palazzole. The song was finally mastered by Chris Athens at Sterling Sound in New York City, New York. "Wall to Wall" was released as the lead single from Brown's second studio album, Exclusive (2007). On May 29, 2007, Jive Records and Zomba Recordings serviced the song to urban radios in the United States.

"Wall to Wall" is an "electric" uptempo R&B and hip hop track. The song is in the key of G minor, and has a bouncing rhythm. The lyrics are based on the attraction between Brown and several women. The song features scratching parts.

== Critical reception ==
Andy Kellman of AllMusic named "Wall to Wall" one of the album's highlights. Allison Stewart of The Washington Post called the song a "thumping, hook-happy beaut" and wrote that "it has just the right mix of familiarity and invention." DJ Z of DJ Booth called the song an "infectious dance number that should have ladies running towards the floor." Nathan S., a writer for the same publication, praised [the producers] production and called it a "perfectly enjoyable R&B/pop track", but commented "it's no "Kiss Kiss"." Patrick Robinson of 411 Mania praised the song as a "decent club jam" despite its low chart standings and said it had the same energy as "Run It!". Trent Fitzgerald of PopCrush listed "Wall to Wall" as the ninth best song released by Brown, writing that "it showed that Brown was a major force to be reckon with in the R&B game."

== Chart performance ==
Wall to Wall debuted on the chart at number 96 Billboard Hot 100, in the issue dated June 16, 2007. Two weeks later, in the issue dated June 30, 2007, it peaked at number 79 on the chart, becoming his least successful single at the time. "Wall to Wall" spent a total of nine weeks on the Billboard Hot 100. The song also chart on the US R&B/Hip-Hop Songs chart, peaking at number 22. On November 22, 2017, the single was certified platinum by the Recording Industry Association of America (RIAA) for sales of over a million copies in the United States.

In other countries, the single charted better on the New Zealand Top 40, debuting and peaking at number fifteen in the issue dated August 13, 2007. In the United Kingdom, the song debuted at number 75 in the issue dated September 1, 2007, where it spent another week at number 85 before falling off the chart. "Wall to Wall" debuted and peaked at number 21 on the Australian Singles Chart in the issue dated September 23, 2007. It spent a total of ten weeks on the chart. In Switzerland, the song spent only four weeks on the singles chart, peaking at number 87 in its last week.

== Music video ==
The music video for "Wall to Wall," directed by Erik White and Chris Brown, is an imitation of the 1998 film Blade, but tributes Michael Jackson's Thriller. The video was released to AOL Music on May 21, 2007, filmed at the Jewish community center, Brandeis-Bardin Institute, made famous for being the Command Center/Power Chamber on Mighty Morphin Power Rangers to Power Rangers Turbo.

=== Synopsis ===
It begins with Brown and two friends walking towards his car. As his friends leave, he hears a female voice calling his name. He then gets inside his car, only to see in the other seat a woman grabs him by the head and bites him with her fangs. He wakes up sometime later dressed all black clothing and wearing fangs, indicating he has been turned into a vampire. Brown drives to a remote building, while the sound of the woman's voice grows stronger. He gets out of the car and as the song begins, he takes off his vampire trench coat which leads to the dance sequences with two young dancers. They then enter the building with flashlights, which is filled with women reaching out to Brown. He then sees the vampiress that bit him and he notices three women doing acrobatics on the wall. After performing a dance sequence on a wall with two other dancers, Brown escapes. The vampiress sees him escape, she makes a run, takes off her vampire trench coat and tries to surround him while many women enter the room and surround him as he begins to levitate in the light. During this levitation, the moon moves away from and in front of the sun, causing Brown to transform back to a human and then to a vampire again. It then enters a dance sequence with the female and male dancers, which lasts up until the last twenty seconds of the video. Sean Garrett, one of the song's writers, makes a cameo appearance. After the dance sequence ends, Brown transports back to the scene where the vampiress appears in his car and bites him.

== Track listing ==
Digital single

1. "Wall to Wall" - 3:48

Two-track single

1. "Wall to Wall" - 3:48
2. "Wall to Wall JORDAN RUSSLE (Instrumental)" - 3:48

Five-track EP

1. "Wall to Wall (Main Version)" - 3:48
2. "Wall to Wall (Mike D Remix) (featuring Elephant Man)" - 3:43
3. "Wall to Wall (Remix) (featuring Jadakiss)" - 4:30
4. "Wall to Wall (B&B Remix)" - 3:10
5. "Wall to Wall (Ashanti Boyz Remix)" - 3:04

CD Single

1. "Wall to Wall" - 3:48
2. "Wall to Wall (Instrumental)" - 3:48
3. "Wall to Wall (Remix) (featuring Jadakiss)" - 4:30
4. "Wall to Wall (Mike D Remix) (featuring Elephant Man)" - 3:43
5. "Wall to Wall (Video)" - 5:21

Four-track EP

1. "Wall to Wall" - 3:48
2. "Wall to Wall (Instrumental)" - 3:48
3. "Wall to Wall (Remix) (featuring Jadakiss)" - 4:30
4. "Wall to Wall (Mike D Remix) (featuring Elephant Man)" - 3:43

== Credits ==
Credits adapted from Exclusive liner notes.

Recording, mixing and mastering

- Recorded at Silent Sound Studios in Atlanta, Georgia
- Mixed at Chung King Studios in New York City, New York
- Mastered at Sterling Sound in New York City, New York

Personnel

- Vocals – Chris Brown
- Songwriting – Sean Garrett, Walter Scott
- Production – Sean Garrett, Great Scott
- Recording – Carlton Lynn
- Mixing – Brian Stanley, assisted by Anthony Palazzole
- Mastering – Chris Athens

== Charts ==
=== Weekly charts ===
Weekly chart performance for "Wall to Wall"
Chart (2007)	Peak position
Australia (ARIA)	21
Australian Urban (ARIA)	5
Germany (GfK)	59
Ireland (IRMA)	47
New Zealand (Recorded Music NZ)	15
Switzerland (Schweizer Hitparade)	87
UK Singles (Official Charts)	75
US Billboard Hot 100	79
US Hot R&B/Hip-Hop Songs (Billboard)	22
US Rhythmic Airplay (Billboard)	16

=== Year-end charts ===
Year-end chart performance for "Wall to Wall"
Chart (2007)	Position
Brazil (Crowley)	49
US Hot R&B/Hip-Hop Songs (Billboard)	89

== Certifications ==
Certifications for "Wall to Wall"
Region	Certification	Certified units/sales
Australia (ARIA)	Platinum	70,000^{‡}
New Zealand (RMNZ)	Platinum	30,000^{‡}
United States (RIAA)	Platinum	1,000,000^{‡}
^{‡} Sales+streaming figures based on certification alone.

== Radio and release history ==
Release dates and formats for "Wall to Wall"
Country	Date	Format	Label
United States	May 29, 2007	Rhythmic crossover	Jive Records, Zomba Recordings
Australia	June 25, 2007	Digital download	Zomba Recordings
Austria	June 25, 2007	Digital download	Zomba Recordings
Denmark	June 25, 2007	Digital download	Zomba Recordings
Finland	June 25, 2007	Digital download	Zomba Recordings
Italy	June 25, 2007	Digital download	Zomba Recordings
New Zealand	June 25, 2007	Digital download	Zomba Recordings
Norway	June 25, 2007	Digital download	Zomba Recordings
Switzerland	June 25, 2007	Digital download	Zomba Recordings
Belgium	August 6, 2007	Digital download	Zomba Recordings
Denmark	August 6, 2007	Digital download	Zomba Recordings
Germany	August 6, 2007	Digital download	Zomba Recordings
Netherlands	August 6, 2007	Digital download	Zomba Recordings
Denmark	August 6, 2007	EP	Zomba Recordings
Australia	August 19, 2007	EP	Zomba Recordings
Austria	August 19, 2007	EP	Zomba Recordings
Belgium	August 19, 2007	EP	Zomba Recordings
Brazil	August 19, 2007	EP	Zomba Recordings
Denmark	August 19, 2007	EP	Zomba Recordings
Finland	August 19, 2007	EP	Zomba Recordings
France	August 19, 2007	EP	Zomba Recordings
Germany	August 19, 2007	EP	Zomba Recordings
Ireland	August 19, 2007	EP	Zomba Recordings
Italy	August 19, 2007	EP	Zomba Recordings
Mexico	August 19, 2007	EP	Zomba Recordings
Netherlands	August 19, 2007	EP	Zomba Recordings
New Zealand	August 19, 2007	EP	Zomba Recordings
Norway	August 19, 2007	EP	Zomba Recordings
Spain	August 19, 2007	EP	Zomba Recordings
Sweden	August 19, 2007	EP	Zomba Recordings
Switzerland	August 19, 2007	EP	Zomba Recordings
United Kingdom	August 19, 2007	EP	Zomba Recordings
Austria	August 31, 2007	Digital download	Zomba Recordings
Switzerland	August 31, 2007	Digital download	Zomba Recordings
United States	September 10, 2007	CD single	BMG
Austria	September 21, 2007	EP	Zomba Recordings
