= Mariah the Scientist discography =

Discography of American singer Mariah the Scientist

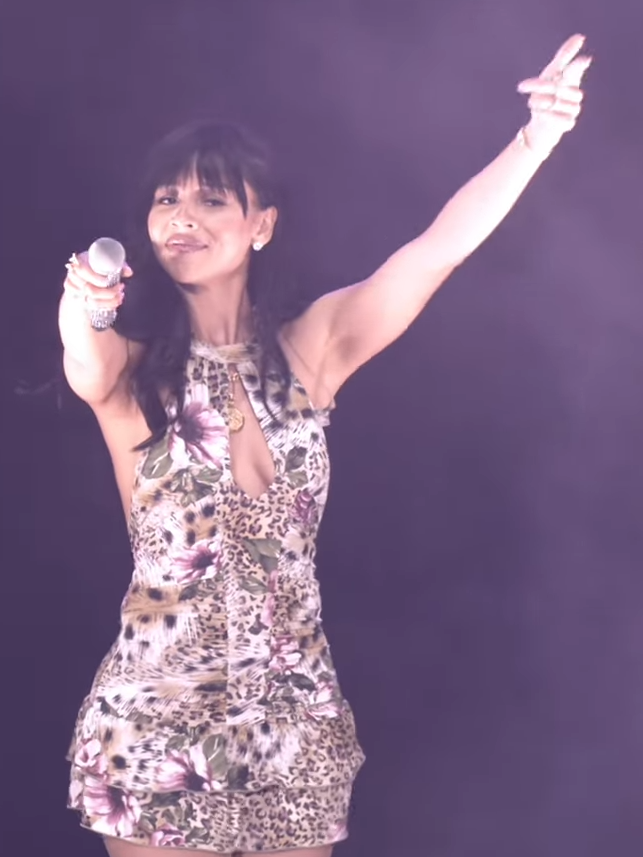
- Mariah the Scientist performing at the State Farm Arena during Hot 97's Birthday Bash in June 2025
- Studio albums: 4
- EPs: 2
- Singles: 14

American singer-songwriter Mariah the Scientist has released four studio albums, two extended plays, and 14 singles.

== Albums ==
=== Studio albums ===
List of studio albums, with selected details, chart positions and certifications
Title	Album details	Peak chart positions				Certifications
Title	Album details	US	US R&B/HH	US R&B	AUS	Certifications
Master	Released: August 23, 2019; Label: One Umbrella, RCA; Formats: Digital download, streaming	—	—	—	—	
Ry Ry World	Released: July 16, 2021; Label: One Umbrella, RCA; Formats: Digital download, streaming	— (Note: Ry Ry World peaked at number four on the Billboard Heatseekers Albums chart.)	—	—	—	
To Be Eaten Alive	Released: October 27, 2023; Label: Buckles Laboratories, Epic; Formats: LP, digital download, streaming	93	41	14	—	
Hearts Sold Separately	Released: August 22, 2025; Label: Buckles Laboratories, Epic; Formats: LP, CD, digital download, streaming	11	3	1	73	RIAA: Gold
"—" denotes a recording that did not chart or was not released in that territory.

=== Extended plays ===
List of extended plays, with selected details and chart positions
Title	EP details	Peak chart positions
Title	EP details	US Heat.
To Die For	Released: January 20, 2018; Label: Self-released; Formats: Digital download, streaming	—
Buckles Laboratories Presents: The Intermission	Released: March 11, 2022; Label: One Umbrella, RCA; Formats: Digital download, streaming	16

== Singles ==
=== As lead artist ===
List of singles as lead artist, with selected chart positions, certifications and originating album
Title	Year	Peak chart positions					Certifications	Album
Title	Year	US	US R&B/HH	US R&B	NZ Hot	WW	Certifications	Album
"Beetlejuice"	2019	—	—	—	—	—		Master
"Reminders"	2019	—	—	—	—	—		Master
"RIP"	2020	—	—	—	—	—		Ry Ry World
"Always n Forever" (featuring Lil Baby)	2020	—	—	—	—	—	RIAA: Platinum; BPI: Silver	Ry Ry World
"2 You"	2021	—	—	—	—	—	RIAA: Platinum; RMNZ: Gold	Ry Ry World
"Aura"	2021	—	—	—	—	—		Ry Ry World
"Spread Thin"	2022	— (Note: "Spread Thin" did not enter the Billboard Hot 100, but peaked at number 19 on the Bubbling Under Hot 100 chart.)	—	15	—	—	RIAA: 3× Platinum; BPI: Silver; RMNZ: Platinum	Buckles Laboratories Presents: The Intermission
"Stone Cold" (with Dess Dior)	2022	—	—	—	—	—		Non-album single
"Bout Mine"	2022	—	—	—	—	—		To Be Eaten Alive
"Rear View" (with YoungBoy Never Broke Again)	2023	—	50	—	—	—		Don't Try This at Home
"From a Woman"	2023	—	—	18	—	—	RIAA: Gold	To Be Eaten Alive
"Out of Luck"	2023	—	— (Note: "Out of Luck" did not enter the Hot R&B/Hip-Hop Songs chart, but peaked at number 39 on the R&B/Hip-Hop Airplay chart.)	—	—	—		To Be Eaten Alive
"Burning Blue"	2025	25	3	2	4	83	RIAA: 2× Platinum; RMNZ: Gold	Hearts Sold Separately
"Is It a Crime" (with Kali Uchis)	2025	27	6	5	10	—	RIAA: Platinum	Hearts Sold Separately
"Death Do Us Part" (with Fridayy)	2025	—	37	9	—	—		Everybody Got Somebody
"—" denotes a recording that did not chart or was not released in that territory.

=== As featured artist ===
List of singles as a featured artist, with selected chart positions, certifications and originating album
Title	Year	Peak chart positions				Certifications	Album
Title	Year	US	US R&B/HH	US Rap	NZ Hot	Certifications	Album
"Wish 4 You" (TheGoodPerry featuring Mariah the Scientist)	2019	—	—	—	—		See You There
"Secrets (Remix)" (A Boogie wit da Hoodie featuring Mariah the Scientist)	2023	—	—	—	—		Non-album single
"Ain't Even Friends" (Ryan Trey featuring Mariah the Scientist)	2023	—	—	—	—		Streets Say You Miss Me
"IDGAF" (Tee Grizzley featuring Mariah the Scientist and Chris Brown)	2023	98	30	22	9	RIAA: Gold; RMNZ: Gold	Tee's Coney Island
"Slow Down" (KitschKrieg featuring Future, Fridayy and Mariah the Scientist)	2024	—	—	—	—		TBA
"Bottles & Lights" (Chxrry featuring Mariah the Scientist)	2026	—	—	—	—		U, Me & My Ego
"—" denotes a recording that did not chart or was not released in that territory.

=== Promotional singles ===
List of promotional singles, showing year released and originating album
Title	Year	Album
"Christmas in Toronto"	2022	Non-album promotional single
"Different Pages"	2023	To Be Eaten Alive

== Other charted and certified songs ==
List of other charted and certified songs, with selected chart positions, certifications and originating album
Title	Year	Peak chart positions						Certifications	Album
Title	Year	US	US R&B/HH	US R&B	CAN	NZ Hot	WW	Certifications	Album
"All for Me"	2021	—	—	—	—	—	—	RIAA: Platinum	Ry Ry World
"Dark Days" (with 21 Savage)	2024	70	31	—	60	—	138		American Dream
"Sacrifice"	2025	88	20	8	—	40	—		Hearts Sold Separately
"United Nations + 1000 Ways to Die"	2025	— (Note: "United Nations + 1000 Ways to Die" did not enter the Billboard Hot 100, but peaked at number 24 on the Bubbling Under Hot 100 chart.)	31	11	—	—	—		Hearts Sold Separately
"Eternal Flame"	2025	—	36	14	—	—	—		Hearts Sold Separately
"All I Want + In Pursuit"	2025	—	37	15	—	—	—		Hearts Sold Separately
"More"	2025	—	—	20	—	—	—		Hearts Sold Separately
"Rainy Days"	2025	— (Note: "Rainy Days" did not enter the Billboard Hot 100, but peaked at number 11 on the Bubbling Under Hot 100 chart.)	29	10	—	—	—		Hearts Sold Separately
"Like You Never"	2025	—	34	13	—	—	—		Hearts Sold Separately
"No More Entertainers"	2025	—	38	16	—	—	—		Hearts Sold Separately
"Robbed You" (with Summer Walker)	2025	58	10	7	—	16	—		Finally Over It
"Santa Baby"	2025	—	36	9	—	—	—		Non-album song
"—" denotes a recording that did not chart or was not released in that territory.

== Guest appearances ==
List of non-single guest appearances, with other performing artists and originating album
Title	Year	Other artist(s)	Album
"Abandoned"	2019	Trippie Redd	A Love Letter to You 4
"P&E"	2024	A Boogie wit da Hoodie	Better Off Alone
"Look What You Did"	2024	Latto	Sugar Honey Iced Tea
"Out of Luck"	2024	KAYTRANADA	Timel
"Situationship"	2024	Tee Grizzley	Post Traumatic
"Dark Days"	2024	21 Savage	American Dream
"Robbed You"	2025	Summer Walker	Finally Over It
"Alone"	2025	Halle Bailey	Love?... or Something Like It
"Make Me"	2026	Latto	Big Mama
"Bottles & Lights"	2026	Chxrry	U, Me & My Ego
