= BET Award for Viewer's Choice =

American music video awards

BET Awards for Viewer's Choice
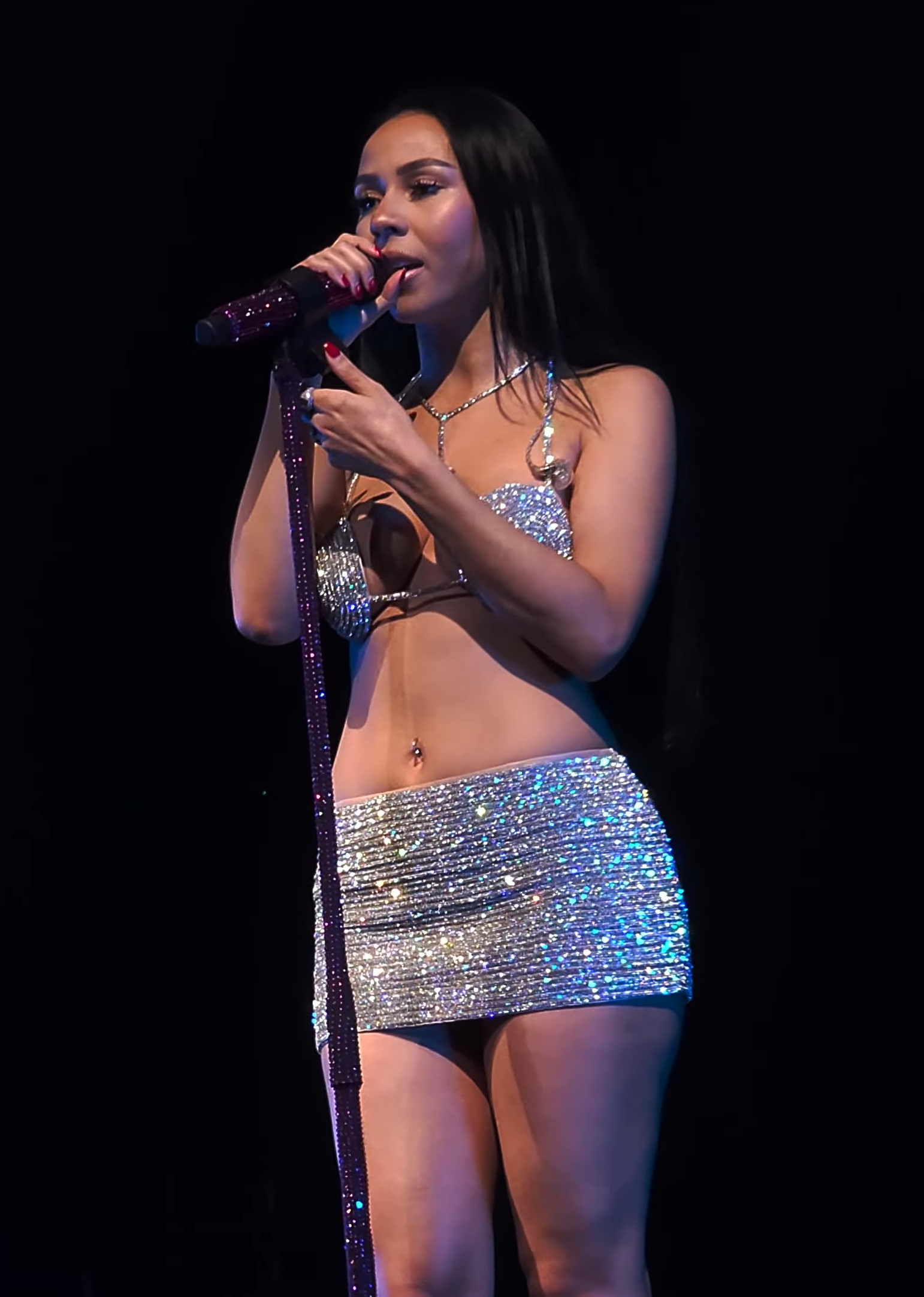
- "Burning Blue" by Mariah the Scientist is the most recent recipient
- Country: United States
- Presented by: BET Awards
- First award: 2001
- Currently held by: Mariah the Scientist – "Burning Blue" (2026)

Highlights
- Most wins: Beyoncé (5)
- Most nominations: Drake (21)

The BET Award for Viewer's Choice Award is determined by the fans. The all-time winner in this category is Beyoncé with five wins. Drake is the most nominated artist with twenty one nominations.

== Winners and nominees ==
Winners are listed first and highlighted in bold.

=== 2000s ===
Year	Artist	Song	Ref
2001
2001	**Bow Wow**	**"Bow Wow (That's My Name)"**	
2001	Destiny's Child	"Independent Women Part I"	
2001	Jay-Z	"I Just Wanna Love U (Give It 2 Me)"	
2001	R. Kelly	"I Wish"	
2002
2002	**B2K**	**"Uh Huh"**	
2002	Aaliyah	"Rock the Boat"	
2002	Bow Wow	"Take Ya Home"	
2002	Ja Rule (featuring Ashanti)	"Always on Time"	
2002	Alicia Keys	"Fallin'"	
2003
2003	**B2K (featuring P. Diddy)**	**"Bump, Bump, Bump"**	
2003	50 Cent	"In da Club"	
2003	Erykah Badu (featuring Common)	"Love of My Life (An Ode to Hip-Hop)"	
2003	Missy Elliott	"Work It"	
2003	R. Kelly	"Ignition (Remix)"	
2004
2004	**Usher (featuring Lil' Jon and Ludacris)**	**"Yeah!"**	
2004	Beyoncé (featuring Jay-Z)	"Crazy in Love"	
2004	Lil' Jon and the Eastside Boyz (featuring Ying Yang Twins)	"Get Low"	
2004	Outkast	"Hey Ya!"	
2004	Kanye West (featuring Syleena Johnson)	"All Falls Down"	
2005
2005	**Omarion**	**"O"**	
2005	Ciara (featuring Missy Elliott)	"1, 2 Step"	
2005	Destiny's Child (featuring Lil Wayne and T.I.)	"Soldier"	
2005	Mario	"Let Me Love You"	
2005	Terror Squad	"Lean Back"	
2005	T.I.	"U Don't Know Me"	
2006
2006	**Chris Brown**	**"Yo (Excuse Me Miss)"**	
2006	Mariah Carey	"Don't Forget About Us"	
2006	Keyshia Cole	"Love"	
2006	Ne-Yo	"So Sick"	
2006	Busta Rhymes	"Touch It"	
2006	T.I.	"What You Know"	
2007
2007	**Birdman and Lil Wayne**	**"Stuntin' Like My Daddy"**	
2007	Beyoncé	"Irreplaceable"	
2007	Bow Wow (featuring Chris Brown and Johntá Austin)	"Shortie Like Mine"	
2007	Ciara	"Promise"	
2007	DJ UNK	"Walk It Out"	
2007	Ne-Yo	"Because of You"	
2007	Robin Thicke	"Lost Without U"	
2008
2008	**Lil Wayne (featuring Static Major)**	**"Lollipop"**	
2008	Chris Brown (featuring T-Pain)	"Kiss Kiss"	
2008	Keyshia Cole (featuring Missy Elliott and Lil' Kim)	"Let It Go"	
2008	Alicia Keys	"No One"	
2008	Soulja Boy	"Crank That (Soulja Boy)"	
2008	Jordin Sparks and Chris Brown	"No Air"	
2009
2009	**T.I. (featuring Rihanna)**	**"Live Your Life"**	
2009	Beyoncé	"Single Ladies (Put a Ring on It)"	
2009	Keri Hilson (featuring Lil Wayne)	"Turnin' Me On"	
2009	Lil Wayne	"A Milli"	
2009	Soulja Boy (featuring Sammie)	"Kiss Me Thru the Phone"	
2009	T-Pain (featuring Lil Wayne)	"Can't Believe It"	
2009	Kanye West	"Love Lockdown"	

=== 2010s ===
Year	Artist	Song	Ref
2010
2010	**Rihanna (featuring Young Jeezy)**	**"Hard"**	
2010	Beyoncé	"Sweet Dreams"	
2010	Jay-Z (featuring Alicia Keys)	"Empire State of Mind"	
2010	Monica	"Everything to Me"	
2010	Trey Songz (featuring Fabolous)	"Say Ahh"	
2010	Young Money (featuring Lloyd)	"BedRock"	
2011
2011	**Chris Brown (featuring Busta Rhymes and Lil Wayne)**	**"Look at Me Now"**	
2011	Lil Wayne (featuring Cory Gunz)	"6 Foot 7 Foot"	
2011	Nicki Minaj (featuring Drake)	"Moment 4 Life"	
2011	Mindless Behavior	"My Girl"	
2011	Rihanna (featuring Drake)	"What's My Name?"	
2011	Trey Songz (featuring Nicki Minaj)	"Bottoms Up"	
2012
2012	**Mindless Behavior**	**"Hello"**	
2012	Beyoncé	"Love on Top"	
2012	Chris Brown	"Turn Up the Music"	
2012	Drake (featuring Lil Wayne and Tyga)	"The Motto"	
2012	Jay-Z and Kanye West (featuring Otis Redding)	"Otis"	
2012	Wale (featuring Miguel)	"Lotus Flower Bomb"	
2013
2013	**Drake**	**"Started from the Bottom"**	
2013	ASAP Rocky (featuring Drake, 2 Chainz, & Kendrick Lamar)	"Fuckin' Problems"	
2013	Kendrick Lamar	"Swimming Pools (Drank)"	
2013	Miguel	"Adorn"	
2013	Rihanna	"Diamonds"	
2013	Justin Timberlake (featuring Jay-Z)	"Suit & Tie"	
2014
2014	**August Alsina (featuring Trinidad James)**	**"I Luv This Shit"**	
2014	Jhené Aiko	"The Worst"	
2014	Beyoncé (featuring Jay-Z)	"Drunk in Love"	
2014	Drake	"Worst Behavior"	
2014	Pharrell Williams	"Happy"	
2015
2015	**Nicki Minaj (featuring Drake, Lil Wayne and Chris Brown)**	**"Only"**	
2015	Beyoncé	"7/11"	
2015	Dej Loaf	"Try Me"	
2015	Kendrick Lamar	"i"	
2015	Rae Sremmurd (featuring Nicki Minaj and Young Thug)	"Throw Sum Mo"	
2015	The Weeknd	"Earned It"	
2016
2016	**Beyoncé**	**"Formation"**	
2016	Chris Brown	"Back to Sleep"	
2016	Drake	"Hotline Bling"	
2016	Future (featuring Drake)	"Where Ya At"	
2016	Rihanna (feat. Drake)	"Work"	
2016	Bryson Tiller	"Don't"	
2017
2017	**Beyoncé**	**"Sorry"**	
2017	Drake	"Fake Love"	
2017	Bruno Mars	"24K Magic"	
2017	Migos (featuring Lil Uzi Vert)	"Bad and Boujee"	
2017	Rae Sremmurd (featuring Gucci Mane)	"Black Beatles"	
2017	The Weeknd (featuring Daft Punk)	"Starboy"	
2018
2018	**Cardi B**	**"Bodak Yellow"**	
2018	DJ Khaled (featuring Rihanna & Bryson Tiller)	"Wild Thoughts"	
2018	Migos, Nicki Minaj and Cardi B	"MotorSport"	
2018	Kendrick Lamar	"HUMBLE."	
2018	Drake	"God's Plan"	
2018	SZA (featuring Travis Scott)	"Love Galore"	
2019
2019	**Ella Mai**	**"Trip"**	
2019	Cardi B, Bad Bunny and J Balvin	"I Like It"	
2019	Childish Gambino	"This is America"	
2019	J. Cole	"Middle Child"	
2019	Drake	"In My Feelings"	
2019	Travis Scott (featuring Drake)	"Sicko Mode"	

=== 2020s ===
Year	Artist	Song	Ref
2020
2020	Megan Thee Stallion (featuring Nicki Minaj and Ty Dolla $ign)	**"Hot Girl Summer"**	
2020	Chris Brown (featuring Drake)	"No Guidance"	
2020	DaBaby	"Bop"	
2020	Future (featuring Drake)	"Life Is Good"	
2020	Roddy Ricch	"The Box"	
2020	The Weeknd	"Heartless"	
2021
2021	**Megan Thee Stallion (featuring Beyoncé)**	**"Savage (Remix)"**	
2021	Cardi B (featuring Megan Thee Stallion)	"WAP"	
2021	Chris Brown and Young Thug	"Go Crazy"	
2021	DaBaby (featuring Roddy Ricch)	"Rockstar"	
2021	DJ Khaled (featuring Drake)	"Popstar"	
2021	Drake (featuring Lil Durk)	"Laugh Now Cry Later"	
2021	Lil Baby	"The Bigger Picture"	
2021	Silk Sonic	"Leave the Door Open"	
2022	—N/a		
2023
2023	**Beyoncé**	**"Break My Soul"**	
2023	Burna Boy	"Last Last"	
2023	Drake (featuring 21 Savage)	"Jimmy Cooks"	
2023	Future (featuring Drake and Tems)	"Wait for U"	
2023	Jack Harlow	"First Class"	
2023	Lizzo	"About Damn Time"	
2023	Nicki Minaj	"Super Freaky Girl"	
2023	SZA	"Kill Bill"	
2024
2024	**Beyoncé**	**"Texas Hold 'Em"**	
2024	Doja Cat	"Agora Hills"	
2024	Lil Durk (featuring J. Cole)	"All My Life"	
2024	Gunna	"Fukumean"	
2024	Jack Harlow	"Lovin on Me"	
2024	Muni Long	"Made for Me"	
2024	Victoria Monét	"On My Mama"	
2024	Drake (featuring Sexyy Red & SZA)	"Rich Baby Daddy"	
2024	Chris Brown (featuring Davido & Lojay)	"Sensational"	
2024	Tyla	"Water"	
2025
2025	**Chris Brown**	**"Residuals"**	
2025	Latto	"Brokey"	
2025	Doechii	"Denial Is a River"	
2025	Future, Metro Boomin & Kendrick Lamar	"Like That"	
2025	Kendrick Lamar & SZA	"Luther"	
2025	Drake	"Nokia"	
2025	Kendrick Lamar	"Not Like Us"	
2025	GloRilla	"TGIF"	
2026
2026	**Mariah the Scientist**	**"Burning Blue"**	
2026	Clipse & Kendrick Lamar	"Chains & Whips"	
2026	Tyla	"Chanel"	
2026	Kehlani	"Folded"	
2026	Bruno Mars	"I Just Might"	
2026	Mariah the Scientist & Kali Uchis	"Is It a Crime"	
2026	Chris Brown (featuring Bryson Tiller)	"It Depends"	
2026	Olivia Dean	"Man I Need"	
2026	Cardi B	"Outside"	
2026	Dave (featuring Tems)	"Raindance"	
2026	Metro Boomin (featuring Quavo, Breskii, YK Niece & DJ Spinz)	"Take Me Thru Dere"	

== Multiple wins and nominations ==
=== Wins ===
5 wins

- Beyoncé

4 wins

- Lil Wayne

3 wins

- Chris Brown

2 wins

- B2K
- Drake
- Megan Thee Stallion
- Nicki Minaj
- Rihanna

=== Nominations ===
22 nominations

- Drake

13 nominations

- Chris Brown

12 nominations

- Beyoncé

10 nominations

- Lil Wayne

8 nominations

- Kendrick Lamar

7 nominations

- Nicki Minaj

6 nominations

- Jay-Z

5 nominations

- Cardi B
- Rihanna

4 nominations

- Future
- SZA
- T.I.

3 nominations

- Bow Wow
- Missy Elliott
- Alicia Keys
- Bruno Mars (including as part of Silk Sonic)
- Megan Thee Stallion
- Bryson Tiller
- The Weeknd
- Kanye West

2 nominations

- B2K
- Ciara
- J. Cole
- Keyshia Cole
- DaBaby
- Destiny's Child
- DJ Khaled
- Jack Harlow
- Lil' Jon
- Mariah the Scientist
- Metro Boomin
- Miguel
- Mindless Behavior
- Ne-Yo
- R. Kelly
- Rae Sremmurd
- Busta Rhymes
- Roddy Ricch
- Trey Songz
- Soulja Boy
- T-Pain
- Tems
- Tyla
- Young Thug
