= BET Award for Best Male Hip Hop Artist =

American entertainment award category

BET Awards for Best Male Hip Hop Artist
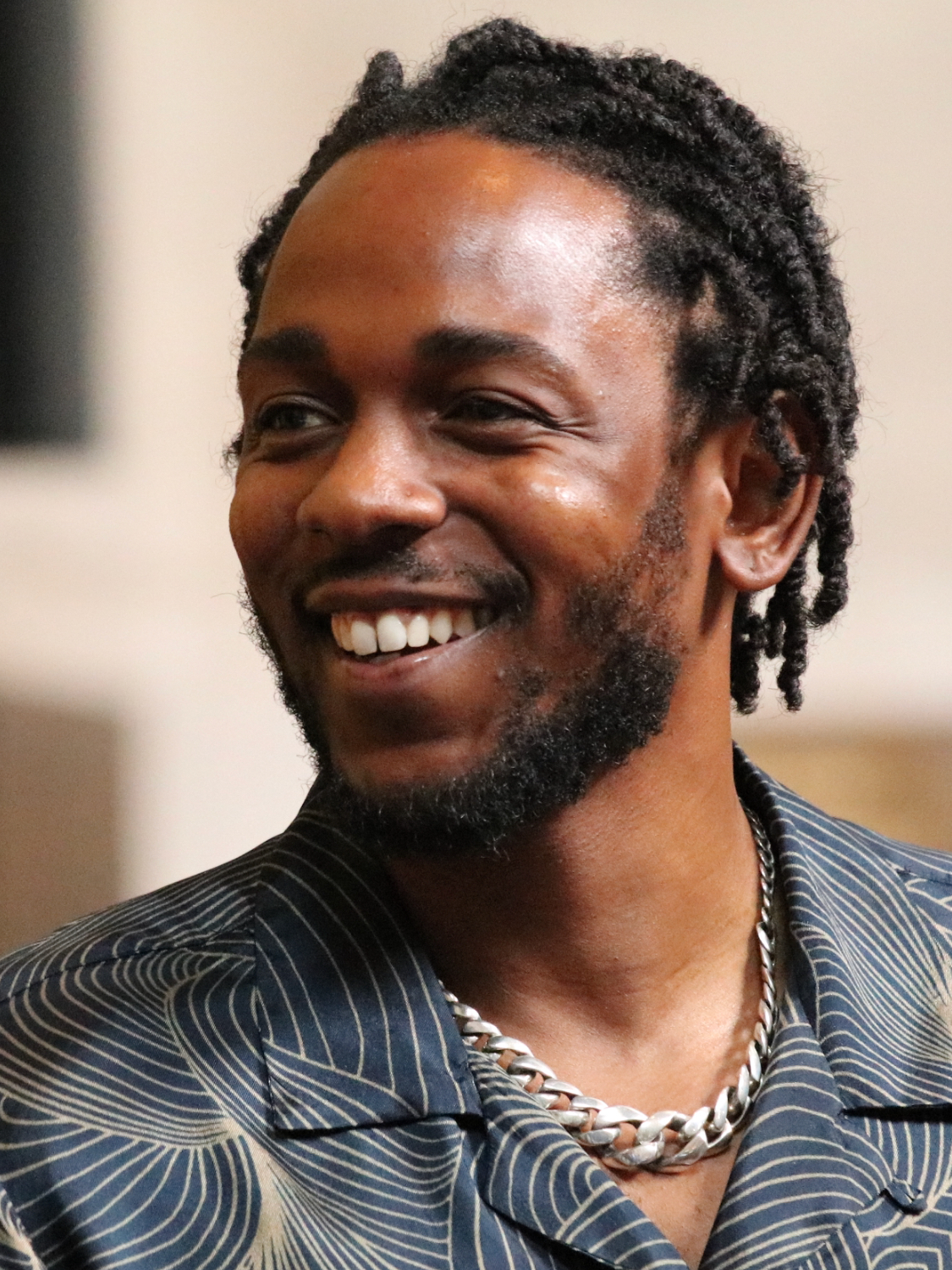
- Kendrick Lamar is the most recent recipient
- Country: United States
- Presented by: BET Awards
- First award: 2001
- Currently held by: Kendrick Lamar (2026)

Highlights
- Most wins: Kendrick Lamar (9)
- Most nominations: Drake (16)

The BET Award for Best Male Hip Hop Artist is an award given to honor the outstanding achievements of male artists in hip hop every year. The winner is determined based on sales and overall quality of content released within the eligibility period. Kendrick Lamar is the all-time winner in this category with eight wins. Drake has the most nominations with sixteen.

== Winners and nominees ==
Winners are listed first and highlighted in bold.

=== 2000s ===
Year	Artist	Ref
2001
2001	**Jay-Z**	
2001	Ja Rule	
2001	Mystikal	
2001	Nelly	
2001	Snoop Dogg	
2002
2002	**Ja Rule**	
2002	Busta Rhymes	
2002	Jay-Z	
2002	Ludacris	
2002	Nas	
2003
2003	**50 Cent**	
2003	Birdman	
2003	Eminem	
2003	Jay-Z	
2003	Nelly	
2003	Snoop Dogg	
2004
2004	**Jay-Z**	
2004	50 Cent	
2004	Chingy	
2004	Ludacris	
2004	Kanye West	
2005
2005	**Kanye West**	
2005	50 Cent	
2005	Jay-Z	
2005	Ludacris	
2005	Snoop Dogg	
2005	T.I.	
2006
2006	**T.I.**	
2006	50 Cent	
2006	Common	
2006	Busta Rhymes	
2006	Kanye West	
2007
2007	**T.I.**	
2007	Diddy	
2007	Jay-Z	
2007	Lil Wayne	
2007	Ludacris	
2008
2008	**Kanye West**	
2008	Common	
2008	Jay-Z	
2008	Lil Wayne	
2008	Snoop Dogg	
2009
2009	**Lil Wayne**	
2009	Kanye West	
2009	Rick Ross	
2009	T.I.	
2009	Young Jeezy	

=== 2010s ===
Year	Artist	Ref
2010
2010	**Drake**	
2010	B.o.B	
2010	Fabolous	
2010	Jay-Z	
2010	Ludacris	
2011
2011	**Kanye West**	
2011	B.o.B	
2011	Drake	
2011	Lil Wayne	
2011	Rick Ross	
2012
2012	**Drake**	
2012	Big Sean	
2012	J. Cole	
2012	Lil Wayne	
2012	Rick Ross	
2012	Young Jeezy	
2013
2013	**Kendrick Lamar**	
2013	2 Chainz	
2013	ASAP Rocky	
2013	Drake	
2013	Future	
2014
2014	**Drake**	
2014	Future	
2014	J. Cole	
2014	Jay-Z	
2014	Kendrick Lamar	
2015
2015	**Kendrick Lamar**	
2015	Big Sean	
2015	Common	
2015	Drake	
2015	J. Cole	
2015	Wale	
2016
2016	**Drake**	
2016	Fetty Wap	
2016	Future	
2016	J. Cole	
2016	Kendrick Lamar	
2016	Kanye West	
2017
2017	**Kendrick Lamar**	
2017	Chance the Rapper	
2017	Drake	
2017	Future	
2017	J. Cole	
2017	Big Sean	
2018
2018	**Kendrick Lamar**	
2018	DJ Khaled	
2018	Drake	
2018	Jay-Z	
2018	J. Cole	
2019
2019	**Nipsey Hussle**	
2019	21 Savage	
2019	Drake	
2019	J. Cole	
2019	Meek Mill	
2019	Travis Scott	

=== 2020s ===
Year	Artist	Ref
2020
2020	**DaBaby**	
2020	Drake	
2020	Future	
2020	Lil Baby	
2020	Roddy Ricch	
2020	Travis Scott	
2021
2021	**Lil Baby**	
2021	DaBaby	
2021	Drake	
2021	J. Cole	
2021	Jack Harlow	
2021	Pop Smoke	
2022
2022	**Kendrick Lamar**	
2022	Drake	
2022	Future	
2022	J. Cole	
2022	Jack Harlow	
2022	Kanye West	
2022	Lil Baby	
2023
2023	**Kendrick Lamar**	
2023	21 Savage	
2023	Drake	
2023	Future	
2023	J. Cole	
2023	Jack Harlow	
2023	Lil Baby	
2024
2024	**Kendrick Lamar**	
2024	21 Savage	
2024	Burna Boy	
2024	Drake	
2024	Future	
2024	Gunna	
2024	J. Cole	
2024	Lil Wayne	
2025
2025	**Kendrick Lamar**	
2025	BigXthaPlug	
2025	Bossman Dlow	
2025	Burna Boy	
2025	Drake	
2025	Future	
2025	Key Glock	
2025	Lil Wayne	
2025	Tyler, the Creator	

== Multiple wins and nominations ==
=== Wins ===
9 wins

- Kendrick Lamar

4 wins

- Drake

3 wins

- Kanye West

2 wins

- Jay-Z
- T.I.

=== Nominations ===
16 nominations

- Drake

11 nominations

- J. Cole

10 nominations

- Jay-Z
- Kendrick Lamar

9 nominations

- Future

8 nominations

- Kanye West

7 nominations

- Lil Wayne

5 nominations

- Ludacris

4 nominations

- 50 Cent
- Lil Baby
- Snoop Dogg
- T.I.

3 nominations

- 21 Savage
- Big Sean
- Common
- Jack Harlow
- Rick Ross

2 nominations

- B.o.B
- Burna Boy
- Busta Rhymes
- DaBaby
- Ja Rule
- Nelly
- Travis Scott
- Young Jeezy

== See also ==
- BET Award for Best Female Hip Hop Artist
