= Hearts Sold Separately Tour =

2026 concert tour by Mariah the Scientist

- World tour by Mariah the Scientist
- Location: Europe; North America; Australia
- Associated album: Hearts Sold Separately
- Start date: January 12, 2026
- End date: May 23, 2026
- Legs: 3
- No. of shows: 51
- Producer: Live Nation

Mariah the Scientist concert chronology
- To Be Eaten Alive Tour (2024); Hearts Sold Separately Tour (2026)

The Hearts Sold Separately Tour was a concert tour by American singer Mariah the Scientist in support of her fourth studio album, Hearts Sold Separately (2025). Produced by Live Nation, the tour began on January 12, 2026, in Paris, France, and concluded on May 23 in Honolulu, Hawaii. It included performances in Europe, North America and Australia. The set list primarily featured songs from Hearts Sold Separately, alongside material from her earlier releases. 4Batz and Akia appeared as opening acts on selected North American dates, while Chxrry performed at selected European shows.

== Background ==
On September 15, 2025, Mariah announced the Hearts Sold Separately Tour in support of her album of the same name. Produced by Live Nation, the initial itinerary comprised 36 cities, beginning in Paris on January 12, 2026, before continuing through the United Kingdom and the Netherlands. The North American leg was scheduled to begin in Miami Beach, Florida, on February 13, with the original announcement listing an April 10 conclusion in Atlanta. Additional performances were subsequently added in several cities, including London, Utrecht, Miami Beach, Orlando, Toronto, Los Angeles and Atlanta. The Chesterfield, Missouri, concert, originally scheduled for March 15, was rescheduled for the following day. 4Batz and Akia performed as opening acts on selected North American dates. Chxrry appeared as an opening act in Manchester.

In January 2026, additional Australian performances were announced for May. The shows began at the Hordern Pavilion in Sydney on May 9, with a second performance added for May 10, before continuing to Brisbane and Melbourne. The tour subsequently included two performances at The Republik in Honolulu on May 22 and 23, with the first listed as sold out.

=== Box office ===
On March 4, 2026, Mariah reported that the tour had sold 125,000 tickets, writing, "125k tickets sold all on my own." She also described the concerts as sold out. The figure was reported during the North American leg and did not include a dollar gross.

== Critical reception ==
Reviewing the Philadelphia performance at The Met, Susanna Coyle of WHIP Radio wrote that Mariah's "voice was steady and smooth throughout the entire performance" and noted that the crowd's energy remained consistent throughout the show. Kahn Santori Davison of Metro Times, reviewing the Detroit concert, described Mariah as "a singer's singer" and praised her vocal performance. He noted that the production emphasized singing rather than elaborate staging, writing that there were "no choreographed dancing or acrobatic type theatrics, just singing." Davison also observed that the audience's participation occasionally made it difficult to hear her vocals. Reviewing the Melbourne performance at Festival Hall, Walton Wong of Scenestr described Mariah's vocals as "properly arresting". The review praised the audience's enthusiasm and the balance between songs from the album and earlier material, although it noted that she appeared almost 40 minutes after the scheduled start time.

In a radio interview published in April 2026, Mariah addressed criticism of the choreography introduced during the tour. She explained, "At the beginning of my tour, I was incorporating dancing because I wanted to do something different," adding that her previous dance experience was limited.

== Set list ==
1. "United Nations" + "1000 Ways to Die"
2. "Different Pages"
3. "All for Me"
4. "Not a Love Song"
5. "Eternal Flame"
6. "Beetlejuice"
7. "Sacrifice"
8. "Good Times"
9. "All I Want" + "In Pursuit"
10. "Like You Never"
11. "Always n Forever"
12. "More"
13. "2 You"
14. "Revenge"
15. "Reminders"
16. "Bout Mine"
17. "From a Woman"
18. "Rainy Days"
19. "Spread Thin"
20. "No More Entertainers"
21. "Is It a Crime"
22. "Burning Blue"

The set list varied between performances. During the February 27 concert at Radio City Music Hall in New York City, Mariah performed "Death Do Us Part" with Fridayy and "Secrets" with A Boogie wit da Hoodie.

== Tour dates ==
List of tour dates, showing date, city, country, venue and notes.
Date	City	Country	Venue	Notes
January 12, 2026	Paris	France	Salle Pleyel	
January 14, 2026	Manchester	United Kingdom	Manchester Academy	
January 15, 2026	Birmingham	United Kingdom	O2 Academy Birmingham	
January 17, 2026	London	United Kingdom	O2 Academy Brixton	
January 18, 2026	London	United Kingdom	O2 Academy Brixton	Additional date
January 20, 2026	Utrecht	Netherlands	TivoliVredenburg	
January 21, 2026	Utrecht	Netherlands	TivoliVredenburg	Additional date
February 12, 2026	Miami Beach	United States	The Fillmore Miami Beach at the Jackie Gleason Theater	Additional date
February 13, 2026	Miami Beach	United States	The Fillmore Miami Beach at the Jackie Gleason Theater	
February 15, 2026	Orlando	United States	House of Blues Orlando	Additional date
February 16, 2026	Orlando	United States	House of Blues Orlando	
February 18, 2026	Nashville	United States	Ryman Auditorium	
February 20, 2026	Virginia Beach	United States	The Dome	
February 21, 2026	Washington, D.C.	United States	The Anthem	
February 24, 2026	Philadelphia	United States	The Met Philadelphia	
February 25, 2026	New Haven	United States	College Street Music Hall	
February 27, 2026	New York City	United States	Radio City Music Hall	
February 28, 2026	Boston	United States	MGM Music Hall at Fenway	
March 3, 2026	Montreal	Canada	MTELUS	
March 5, 2026	Toronto	Canada	HISTORY	
March 6, 2026	Toronto	Canada	HISTORY	Additional date
March 8, 2026	Cincinnati	United States	Andrew J. Brady Music Center	
March 10, 2026	Detroit	United States	Fox Theatre	
March 11, 2026	Chicago	United States	Aragon Ballroom	
March 13, 2026	Milwaukee	United States	Landmark Credit Union Live	Additional date
March 14, 2026	Minneapolis	United States	Fillmore Minneapolis	
March 16, 2026	Chesterfield	United States	The Factory	Rescheduled from March 15
March 18, 2026	Denver	United States	Fillmore Auditorium	
March 19, 2026	Salt Lake City	United States	The Union Event Center	
March 21, 2026	Seattle	United States	Showbox SoDo	
March 22, 2026	Portland	United States	Crystal Ballroom	
March 24, 2026	San Francisco	United States	The Masonic	
March 25, 2026	Oakland	United States	Fox Oakland Theatre	Additional date
March 26, 2026	Anaheim	United States	House of Blues Anaheim	
March 28, 2026	Los Angeles	United States	Hollywood Palladium	
March 29, 2026	Los Angeles	United States	Hollywood Palladium	Additional date
March 31, 2026	Las Vegas	United States	Brooklyn Bowl Las Vegas	
April 1, 2026	Phoenix	United States	Arizona Financial Theatre	
April 3, 2026	Austin	United States	Stubb's	
April 4, 2026	Houston	United States	Bayou Music Center	
April 5, 2026	Dallas	United States	South Side Ballroom	
April 7, 2026	New Orleans	United States	The Fillmore New Orleans	
April 8, 2026	Birmingham	United States	Avondale Brewing Company	
April 10, 2026	Atlanta	United States	Coca-Cola Roxy	
April 11, 2026	Atlanta	United States	Coca-Cola Roxy	Additional date
May 9, 2026	Sydney	Australia	Hordern Pavilion	
May 10, 2026	Sydney	Australia	Hordern Pavilion	Additional date
May 12, 2026	Brisbane	Australia	Fortitude Music Hall	
May 14, 2026	Melbourne	Australia	Festival Hall	
May 22, 2026	Honolulu	United States	The Republik	
May 23, 2026	Honolulu	United States	The Republik	Additional date
