= BET Award for Best Female R&B/Pop Artist =

American entertainment award category

BET Awards for Best Female R&B/Pop Artist
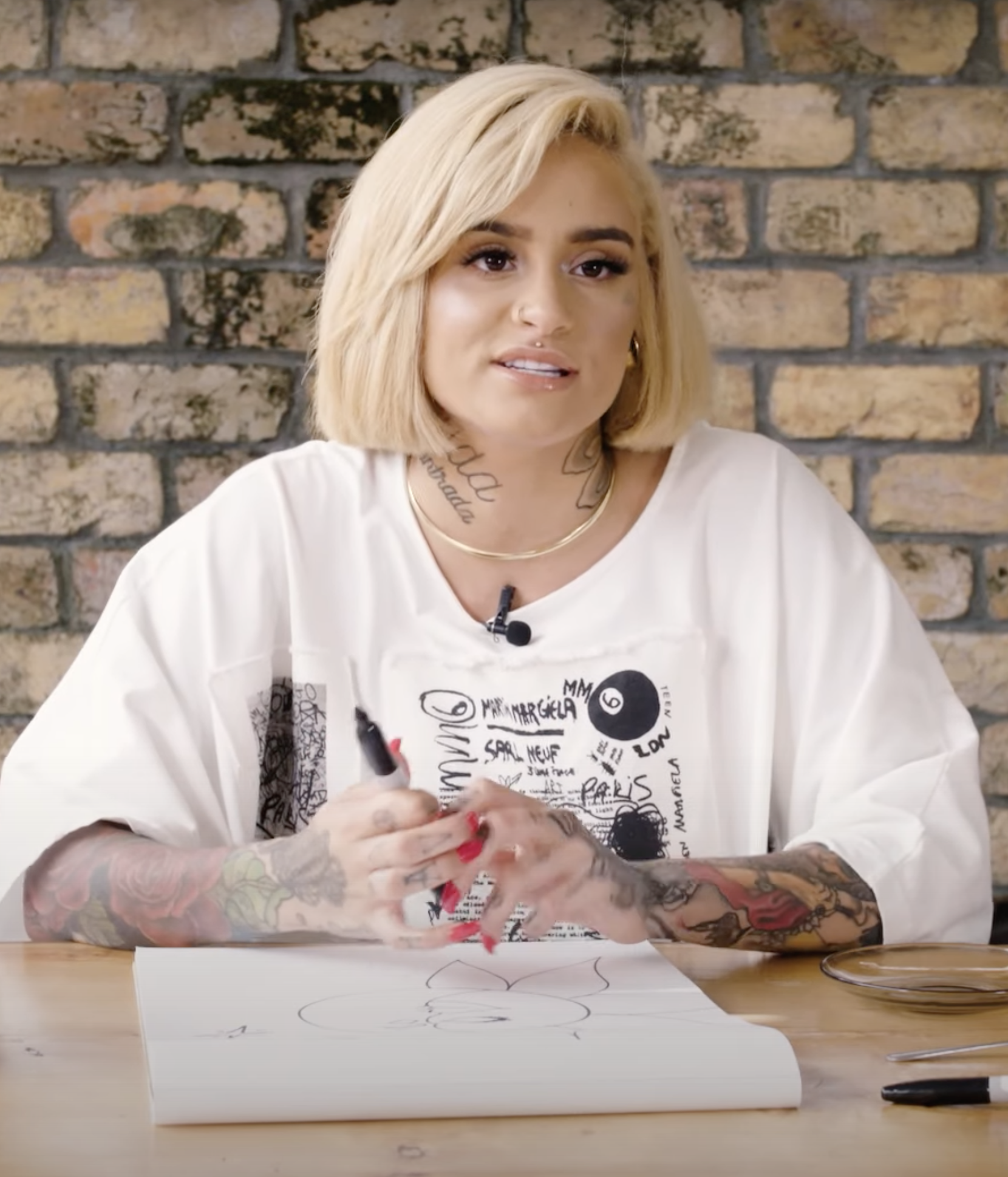
- Kehlani is the most recent recipient
- Country: United States
- Presented by: BET Awards
- First award: 2001
- Currently held by: Kehlani (2026)

Highlights
- Most wins: Beyoncé (10)
- Most nominations: Beyoncé (18)

The BET Award for Best Female R&B/Pop Artist is awarded to the overall best female contemporary R&B, soul, and pop singers who have released an album the previous or same year. The all-time winner in this category is Beyoncé with ten wins; she is also the most nominated artist with eighteen nominations.

== Winners and nominees ==
Winners are listed first and highlighted in bold.

=== 2000s ===
Year	Artist	Ref
2001
2001	**Mary J. Blige**	
2001	Aaliyah	
2001	Erykah Badu	
2001	Janet Jackson	
2001	Jill Scott	
2002
2002	**India Arie**	
2002	Aaliyah	
2002	Mary J. Blige	
2002	Faith Evans	
2002	Alicia Keys	
2003
2003	**India Arie**	
2003	Amerie	
2003	Erykah Badu	
2003	Vivian Green	
2003	Heather Headley	
2004
2004	**Beyoncé**	
2004	Mary J. Blige	
2004	Janet Jackson	
2004	Alicia Keys	
2004	Monica	
2005
2005	**Alicia Keys**	
2005	Amerie	
2005	Mariah Carey	
2005	Ciara	
2005	Fantasia	
2005	Jill Scott	
2006
2006	**Mary J. Blige**	
2006	India Arie	
2006	Beyoncé	
2006	Mariah Carey	
2006	Keyshia Cole	
2007
2007	**Beyoncé**	
2007	Corinne Bailey Rae	
2007	Mary J. Blige	
2007	Ciara	
2007	Jennifer Hudson	
2008
2008	**Alicia Keys**	
2008	Mary J. Blige	
2008	Mariah Carey	
2008	Keyshia Cole	
2008	Rihanna	
2009
2009	**Beyoncé**	
2009	Keyshia Cole	
2009	Keri Hilson	
2009	Jennifer Hudson	
2009	Jazmine Sullivan	

=== 2010s ===
Year	Artist	Ref
2010
2010	**Alicia Keys**	
2010	Beyoncé	
2010	Mary J. Blige	
2010	Melanie Fiona	
2010	Rihanna	
2011
2011	**Rihanna**	
2011	Marsha Ambrosius	
2011	Beyoncé	
2011	Keri Hilson	
2011	Jennifer Hudson	
2012
2012	**Beyoncé**	
2012	Marsha Ambrosius	
2012	Mary J. Blige	
2012	Melanie Fiona	
2012	Rihanna	
2013
2013	**Rihanna**	
2013	Beyoncé	
2013	Tamar Braxton	
2013	Alicia Keys	
2013	Elle Varner	
2014
2014	**Beyoncé**	
2014	Jhené Aiko	
2014	Tamar Braxton	
2014	K. Michelle	
2014	Janelle Monáe	
2014	Rihanna	
2015
2015	**Beyoncé**	
2015	Jhené Aiko	
2015	Ciara	
2015	K. Michelle	
2015	Janelle Monáe	
2015	Rihanna	
2016
2016	**Beyoncé**	
2016	Adele	
2016	Andra Day	
2016	K. Michelle	
2016	Rihanna	
2017
2017	**Beyoncé**	
2017	Mary J. Blige	
2017	Kehlani	
2017	Rihanna	
2017	Solange	
2018
2018	**Beyoncé**	
2018	Kehlani	
2018	SZA	
2018	Rihanna	
2018	H.E.R.	
2019
2019	**Beyoncé**	
2019	Ella Mai	
2019	H.E.R.	
2019	Solange	
2019	SZA	
2019	Teyana Taylor	

=== 2020s ===
Year	Artist	Ref
2020
2020	**Lizzo**	
2020	Beyoncé	
2020	H.E.R.	
2020	Jhené Aiko	
2020	Kehlani	
2020	Summer Walker	
2021
2021	**H.E.R.**	
2021	Beyoncé	
2021	Jazmine Sullivan	
2021	Jhené Aiko	
2021	Summer Walker	
2021	SZA	
2022
2022	**Jazmine Sullivan**	
2022	Chlöe	
2022	Doja Cat	
2022	H.E.R.	
2022	Ari Lennox	
2022	Mary J. Blige	
2022	Summer Walker	
2023
2023	**SZA**	
2023	Ari Lennox	
2023	Beyoncé	
2023	Coco Jones	
2023	H.E.R.	
2023	Lizzo	
2023	Tems	
2024
2024	**SZA**	
2024	Beyoncé	
2024	Coco Jones	
2024	Doja Cat	
2024	H.E.R.	
2024	Muni Long	
2024	Tyla	
2024	Victoria Monét	
2025
2025	**SZA**	
2025	Ari Lennox	
2025	Ayra Starr	
2025	Coco Jones	
2025	Kehlani	
2025	Muni Long	
2025	Summer Walker	
2025	Victoria Monét	

== Multiple wins and nominations ==
=== Wins ===
10 wins

- Beyoncé

3 wins

- Alicia Keys
- SZA

2 wins

- India Arie
- Mary J. Blige
- Rihanna

=== Nominations ===
18 nominations

- Beyoncé

10 nominations

- Mary J. Blige
- Rihanna

7 nominations

- H.E.R.

6 nominations

- Alicia Keys
- SZA

4 nominations

- Jhené Aiko
- Kehlani
- Summer Walker

3 nominations

- India Arie
- Mariah Carey
- Ciara
- Keyshia Cole
- Jennifer Hudson
- Coco Jones
- K. Michelle
- Ari Lennox
- Jazmine Sullivan

2 nominations

- Aaliyah
- Marsha Ambrosius
- Amerie
- Erykah Badu
- Tamar Braxton
- Doja Cat
- Melanie Fiona
- Keri Hilson
- Janet Jackson
- Lizzo
- Muni Long
- Janelle Monáe
- Victoria Monét
- Jill Scott
- Solange

== See also ==
- List of music awards honoring women
- BET Award for Best Male R&B/Pop Artist
