= BET Award for Best Male R&B/Pop Artist =

American entertainment award category

BET Awards for Best Male R&B/Pop Artist
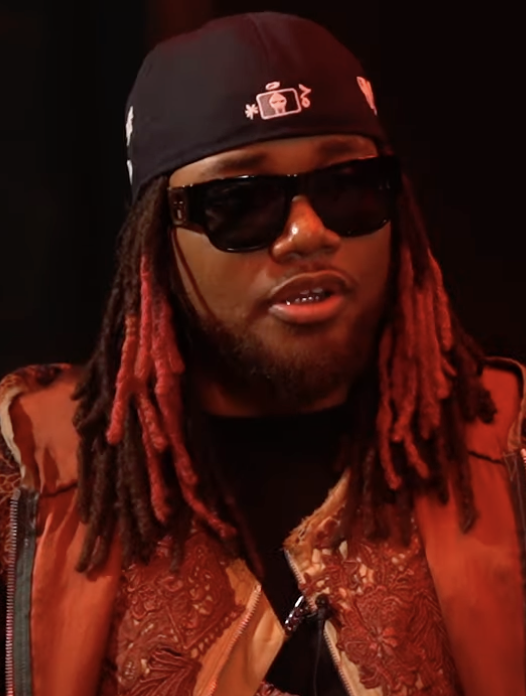
- Leon Thomas is the most recent recipient
- Country: United States
- Presented by: BET Awards
- First award: 2001
- Currently held by: Leon Thomas (2026)

Highlights
- Most wins: Chris Brown (8)
- Most nominations: Chris Brown (19)

The BET Award for Best Male R&B/Pop Artist is awarded to the overall best male contemporary R&B, soul, and pop singers who have released an album the previous or same year. The all-time winner in this category is Chris Brown with eight wins, he is also the most nominated artist with nineteen nominations.

== Winners and nominees ==
Winners are listed first and highlighted in bold.

=== 2000s ===
Year	Artist	Ref
2001
2001	**Musiq**	
2001	Joe	
2001	R. Kelly	
2001	Maxwell	
2001	Carl Thomas	
2002
2002	**Usher**	
2002	Craig David	
2002	Jaheim	
2002	Maxwell	
2002	Musiq	
2003
2003	**Jaheim**	
2003	**R. Kelly**	
2003	Ginuwine	
2003	Musiq	
2003	Justin Timberlake	
2004
2004	**Usher**	
2004	Anthony Hamilton	
2004	R. Kelly	
2004	Ruben Studdard	
2004	Luther Vandross	
2005
2005	**Usher**	
2005	Anthony Hamilton	
2005	John Legend	
2005	Mario	
2005	Prince	
2006
2006	**Prince**	
2006	Chris Brown	
2006	Jamie Foxx	
2006	Anthony Hamilton	
2006	Ne-Yo	
2007
2007	**Ne-Yo**	
2007	Akon	
2007	John Legend	
2007	Gerald Levert	
2007	Robin Thicke	
2008
2008	**Chris Brown**	
2008	Raheem DeVaughn	
2008	J. Holiday	
2008	Ne-Yo	
2008	Trey Songz	
2009
2009	**Ne-Yo**	
2009	The-Dream	
2009	Jamie Foxx	
2009	Ryan Leslie	
2009	T-Pain	

=== 2010s ===
Year	Artist	Ref
2010
2010	**Trey Songz**	
2010	Chris Brown	
2010	Raheem DeVaughn	
2010	Maxwell	
2010	Usher	
2011
2011	**Chris Brown**	
2011	CeeLo Green	
2011	Bruno Mars	
2011	Trey Songz	
2011	Usher	
2012
2012	**Chris Brown**	
2012	Bruno Mars	
2012	Miguel	
2012	Trey Songz	
2012	Usher	
2013
2013	**Miguel**	
2013	Chris Brown	
2013	Bruno Mars	
2013	Justin Timberlake	
2013	Usher	
2014
2014	**Pharrell Williams**	
2014	August Alsina	
2014	Chris Brown	
2014	John Legend	
2014	Justin Timberlake	
2015
2015	**Chris Brown**	
2015	August Alsina	
2015	John Legend	
2015	Trey Songz	
2015	Usher	
2015	The Weeknd	
2016
2016	**Bryson Tiller**	
2016	Chris Brown	
2016	Tyrese Gibson	
2016	Jeremih	
2016	The Weeknd	
2017
2017	**Bruno Mars**	
2017	Chris Brown	
2017	Trey Songz	
2017	Usher	
2017	The Weeknd	
2018
2018	**Bruno Mars**	
2018	Chris Brown	
2018	Khalid	
2018	The Weeknd	
2018	Daniel Caesar	
2019
2019	**Bruno Mars**	
2019	Anderson Paak	
2019	Childish Gambino	
2019	Chris Brown	
2019	John Legend	
2019	Khalid	

=== 2020s ===
Year	Artist	Ref
2020
2020	**Chris Brown**	
2020	Anderson .Paak	
2020	Jacquees	
2020	Khalid	
2020	The Weeknd	
2020	Usher	
2021
2021	**Chris Brown**	
2021	6lack	
2021	Anderson .Paak	
2021	Giveon	
2021	Tank	
2021	The Weeknd	
2022
2022	**The Weeknd**	
2022	Blxst	
2022	Chris Brown	
2022	Giveon	
2022	Lucky Daye	
2022	Bleu	
2022	Wizkid	
2023
2023	**Chris Brown**	
2023	**Usher**	
2023	Brent Faiyaz	
2023	Burna Boy	
2023	Blxst	
2023	Drake	
2023	The Weeknd	
2024
2024	**Usher**	
2024	Brent Faiyaz	
2024	Bryson Tiller	
2024	Burna Boy	
2024	Chris Brown	
2024	Drake	
2024	Fridayy	
2024	October London	
2025
2025	**Chris Brown**	
2025	Bruno Mars	
2025	Drake	
2025	Fridayy	
2025	Leon Thomas	
2025	Teddy Swims	
2025	The Weeknd	
2025	Usher	
2026
2026	**Leon Thomas**	
2026	Brent Faiyaz	
2026	Bruno Mars	
2026	Bryson Tiller	
2026	Chris Brown	
2026	Durand Bernarr	
2026	Giveon	
2026	October London	
2026	Usher	

== Multiple wins and nominations ==
=== Wins ===
8 wins

- Chris Brown

5 wins

- Usher

3 wins

- Bruno Mars

2 wins

- Ne-Yo

=== Nominations ===
19 nominations

- Chris Brown

14 nominations

- Usher

9 nominations

- The Weeknd

8 nominations

- Bruno Mars

6 nominations

- Trey Songz

5 nominations

- John Legend

4 nominations

- Ne-Yo

3 nominations

- Anthony Hamilton
- R. Kelly
- Khalid
- Maxwell
- Musiq
- Anderson .Paak
- Justin Timberlake
- Drake
- Brent Faiyaz
- Bryson Tiller
- Giveon

2 nominations

- August Alsina
- Blxst
- Raheem DeVaughn
- Jamie Foxx
- Jaheim
- Miguel
- Prince
- Burna Boy
- Fridayy
- Leon Thomas
- October London

== See also ==
- BET Award for Best Female R&B/Pop Artist
