= BET Awards 2026 =

American entertainment awards ceremony

2026 BET Awards
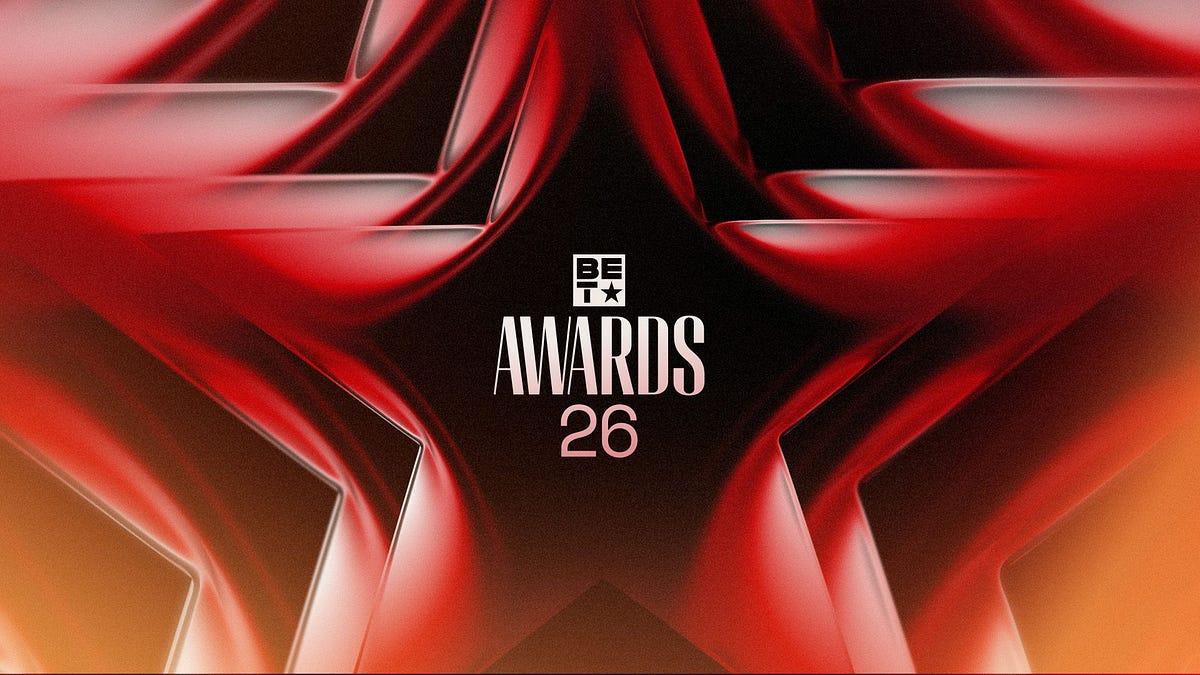
- Sponsored by: Hyundai and Sprite
- Date: June 28, 2026
- Location: Peacock Theater, Los Angeles, California
- Presented by: Black Entertainment Television
- Hosted by: Druski

Highlights
- Most awards: Teyana Taylor (4)
- Most nominations: Cardi B (6)
- Website: www.bet.com/shows/bet-awards.html

Television/radio coverage
- Network: BET, BET Her, MTV, MTV2, Nickelodeon, Logo TV, Paramount Network, VH1, CMT, TV Land
- Produced by: Jesse Collins Entertainment
- Directed by: Marcelo Gama

The 2026 BET Awards were held on June 28, 2026, at the Peacock Theater in Los Angeles, California. The ceremony celebrated excellence across the entertainment industry, recognizing outstanding achievements in music, television, film, and sports. Actor, comedian, and media personality Druski hosted the ceremony for the first time. The nominations were announced on May 19, 2026, with American rapper Cardi B having the most nominations with six. Kendrick Lamar and Mariah the Scientist followed her with five each. The pre-show aired with hosts Rocsi Diaz, Bow Wow, Jason Lee, Loren LoRosa, Tierra Marsh, and Brian McIntosh.

The ceremony also recognized influential figures for their contributions to entertainment and culture. On June 4, BET announced that singer, rapper, and actress Lauryn Hill would be honored with the inaugural Living Legend Icon Award. On June 9, singer, songwriter, and actress Teyana Taylor was announced as the inaugural recipient of the Icon of the Year Award. On June 11, music executive Sylvia Rhone was announced as the recipient of the Ultimate Icon Award, recognizing her extraordinary leadership and enduring impact on the industry.

== Category changes ==
Four new awards were created:

- Fashion Vanguard Award
- Pulse Award
- Living Legend Icon Award
- Icon of the Year

== Performances ==
The first set of performers was announced on June 17, 2026. The second set was announced on June 23, 2026. The third set of performers were announced on June 26, 2026.

Artist(s)	Song(s)
Main Show
T.I.	"Top Back" "Let 'Em Know"
Kehlani; Jamie Foxx; Annalise Bishop	"Folded"
Don Toliver	"E85" "Body"
Raye	"Nightingale Lane"
Cardi B	"ErrTime" "Hello" "Check Please" "Pretty & Petty"
French Montana; Max B Rick Ross	"Ever Since U Left Me (I Went Deaf)" "Minks in Miami"
Tems	"What You Need"
Baby Keem; Momo Boyd	"Circus Circus Freestyle" "Dramatic Girl" "Good Flirts"
Erica Campbell; Le'Andria Johnson	In Memoriam "I Love the Lord" "Total Praise"
The Vanguard; Ari Lennox; Raye; Isaiah Sharkey; George Clinton; Durand Bernarr; BJ the Chicago Kid	Tribute to D'Angelo: "Untitled (How Does It Feel)" "Really Love" "Spanish Joint" "Brown Sugar" "Shit, Damn, Motherfucker" "Devil's Pie" "Chicken Grease"
The War and Treaty; Doechii; SZA; Tierra Whack; Tems; Selah Marley; Doja Cat; Nas; YG Marley; Lizzo; Rapsody; Zion Marley; Alexia Jayy; Queen Latifah; Common	Tribute to Lauryn Hill: "Joyful, Joyful" "Ready or Not" "Fu-Gee-La" "The Sweetest Thing" "The Miseducation of Lauryn Hill" "Superstar" "If I Ruled the World (Imagine That)" "Turn Your Lights Down Low" "Doo Wop (That Thing)" "To Zion" "Killing Me Softly" "Lost Ones"
Lauryn Hill	"Ex-Factor" "Everything Is Everything"
BET Amplified Stage
Kwn	"Risk It All"
Kenny Iko	"Pretty Words"

== Presenters ==
Presenters were announced June 23, 2026.

=== Pre-show ===
- Rocsi Diaz
- Bow Wow
- Jason Lee
- Loren LoRosa
- Tierra Marsh
- Brian McIntosh

=== Main Show ===
- Druski – host
- Nia Long and Jaafar Jackson – presented Best Male Pop/R&B Artist
- Druski and Latto – presented Don Toliver
- Chloe Bailey – presented Kwn
- Terrence J – presented BET's HBWeCU initiative
- Gail Bean and Isaiah John – presented Best Female R&B/Pop Artist
- Janet Jackson – presented Teyana Taylor with the Icon of the Year Award
- Keke Palmer – presented Cardi B
- Yung Miami – presented the BET Her Award
- Keke Palmer – presented Album of the Year
- Carl Anthony Payne II, Chris "Comedian CP" Powell and DeRay Davis
- Ice Cube – presented Baby Keem
- Luke James and Jacob Latimore – presented Best Female Hip Hop Artist
- Marsai Martin – presented Barack Obama
- Imani Archer, Morocco Archer and Michael Archer Jr. – presented the tribute to D'Angelo
- Flau'jae Johnson
- Kelly Rowland – presented Sylvia Rhone with the Ultimate Icon Award
- Miles Caton – presented Kenny Iko
- Ice Cube – introduced Lauryn Hill
- Deon Cole and Diarra Kilpatrick
- Ice Cube – presented Lauryn Hill with the Living Legend Icon Award

== Winners and nominees ==
Below is the list of winners and nominees. Winners are listed first and highlighted in bold.

Album of the Year	Video of the Year
**Let God Sort Em Out – Clipse**; Am I the Drama? – Cardi B; Don't Tap the Glass – Tyler, the Creator; Everything Is a Lot – Wale; The Fall-Off – J. Cole; Hearts Sold Separately – Mariah the Scientist; Mutt Deluxe: Heel – Leon Thomas; The Romantic – Bruno Mars	**"Folded" – Kehlani**; "100" – Ella Mai; "Anxiety" – Doechii; "Burning Blue" – Mariah the Scientist; "Chanel" – Tyla; Escape Room (Short Film) – Teyana Taylor; "Let 'Em Know" – T.I.; "Luther" – Kendrick Lamar and SZA
Viewer's Choice Award	Best Collaboration
**"Burning Blue" – Mariah the Scientist**; "Chains & Whips" – Clipse featuring Kendrick Lamar; "Chanel" – Tyla; "Folded" – Kehlani; "I Just Might" – Bruno Mars; "Is It a Crime" – Mariah the Scientist and Kali Uchis; "It Depends" – Chris Brown featuring Bryson Tiller and Usher; "Man I Need" – Olivia Dean; "Outside" – Cardi B; "Raindance" – Dave featuring Tems; "Take Me Thru Dere" – Metro Boomin featuring Quavo, Breskii, YK Niece and DJ Spinz	**"Chains & Whips" – Clipse featuring Kendrick Lamar**; "ErrTime" – Cardi B featuring Jeezy and Latto; "Go Girl" – Summer Walker, Latto and Doja Cat; "Good Flirts" – Baby Keem featuring Kendrick Lamar and Momo Boyd; "Is It a Crime" – Mariah the Scientist and Kali Uchis; "It Depends" – Chris Brown featuring Bryson Tiller and Usher; "Take Me Thru Dere" – Metro Boomin featuring Quavo, Breskii, YK Niece and DJ Spinz; "WGFT" – Gunna featuring Burna Boy
Best Male R&B/Pop Artist	Best Female R&B/Pop Artist
**Leon Thomas**; Durand Bernarr; Chris Brown; Brent Faiyaz; Giveon; Bruno Mars; October London; Bryson Tiller; Usher	**Kehlani**; Olivia Dean; Coco Jones; Ari Lennox; Ella Mai; Mariah the Scientist; Jill Scott; SZA; Tems
Best Female Hip Hop Artist	Best Male Hip Hop Artist
**Cardi B**; Coi Leray; Doechii; Doja Cat; GloRilla; Latto; Megan Thee Stallion; Monaleo; YK Niece	**Kendrick Lamar**; ASAP Rocky; Baby Keem; BigXthaPlug; DaBaby; Don Toliver; Drake; J. Cole; T.I.
Best New Artist	Best Group
**Olivia Dean**; Belly Gang Kushington; Destin Conrad; Jaydon; Kwn; Miles Minnick; Monaleo; Raye; Trap Dickey	**Clipse**; 41; De La Soul; Flo; French Montana and Max B; Metro Boomin and DJ Spinz; Nas and DJ Premier; Terrace Martin and Kenyon Dixon; Wizkid and Asake
BET Her Award	Dr. Bobby Jones Best Gospel/Inspirational Award
**"Girl, Get Up" – Doechii featuring SZA**; "Already Good (Tasha Slide)" – Tasha Cobbs Leonard; "Be Great" – Jill Scott featuring Trombone Shorty; "Beautiful People" – Jill Scott; "First" – Tems; "Go Girl" – Summer Walker, Latto and Doja Cat; "Gorgeous" – Doja Cat; "Lady Lady" – Olivia Dean	**"Headphones" – Lecrae, Killer Mike and T.I.**; "Able" – Kirk Franklin; "Able" (remix) – Darrel Walls, PJ Morton and Kim Burrell; "All to Thee" – BeBe Winans; "Already Good (Tasha Slide)" – Tasha Cobbs Leonard; "At the Cross" – CeCe Winans; "Church" – Tasha Cobbs Leonard and John Legend; "Do it Again" – Kirk Franklin
Video Director of the Year	Best Movie
**Teyana Taylor**; ASAP Rocky and Dan Streit; Cole Bennett; Benny Boom; Cactus Jack; Cardi B and Patience Foster; Director X; Anderson .Paak; Hype Williams	**Sinners**; Highest 2 Lowest; Him; Number One on the Call Sheet; One Battle After Another; Relationship Goals; Ruth & Boaz; Wicked: For Good
Best Actor	Best Actress
**Michael B. Jordan**; Sterling K. Brown; Colman Domingo; Aldis Hodge; Damson Idris; Delroy Lindo; Anthony Mackie; Aaron Pierre; Denzel Washington	**Teyana Taylor**; Angela Bassett; Quinta Brunson; Ayo Edebiri; Cynthia Erivo; Chase Infiniti; Regina Hall; Coco Jones; Keke Palmer
Sportswoman of the Year	Sportsman of the Year
**A'ja Wilson**; Jordan Chiles; Coco Gauff; Flau'jae Johnson; Naomi Osaka; Angel Reese; Sha'Carri Richardson; Claressa Shields; Gabby Thomas	**Jalen Brunson**; Stephen Curry; Anthony Edwards; Jalen Hurts; LeBron James; Aaron Judge; Shedeur Sanders; Caleb Williams
Ultimate Icon Award	Icon of the Year
**Sylvia Rhone**	**Teyana Taylor**
YoungStars Award	Living Legend Icon Award
**Jazzy's World TV**; Heiress Diana Harris; Leia Hoffmeister; Graceyn Hollingsworth; Daria Johns; Thaddeus J. Mixson; Van Van; North West	**Lauryn Hill**
Fashion Vanguard Award	Pulse Award
**Teyana Taylor**; ASAP Rocky; Bad Bunny; Beyoncé; Cardi B; Colman Domingo; Doechii; Rihanna; Zendaya	**Druski**; 85 South Show; Baby, This is Keke Palmer; Charlamagne tha God; Don Lemon; It Is What It Is; Joe and Jada; On the Radar; R&B Money Podcast

== In Memoriam ==
- Richard Smallwood
- Clive Davis
- Isiah Whitlock Jr.
- Ananda Lewis
- Demond Wilson
- Malcolm-Jamal Warner
- Danielle Spencer
- Michael L. Joyner
- Peabo Bryson
- Lynn Hamilton
- Walter Scott
- Lil Poppa
- T.K. Carter
- Claudette Colvin
- Lamonte McLemore
- Billy Bass Nelson
- Carl Carlton
- Gladys West
- Doran Reed
- Ty Bristol
- Kiki Shepard
- Sonny Rollins
- Charlie Neal
- Oliver "Power" Grant
- Tay Keith
- Dee Freeman
- D'Angelo
