= BET Award for Album of the Year =

American entertainment award category

BET Awards for Album of the Year
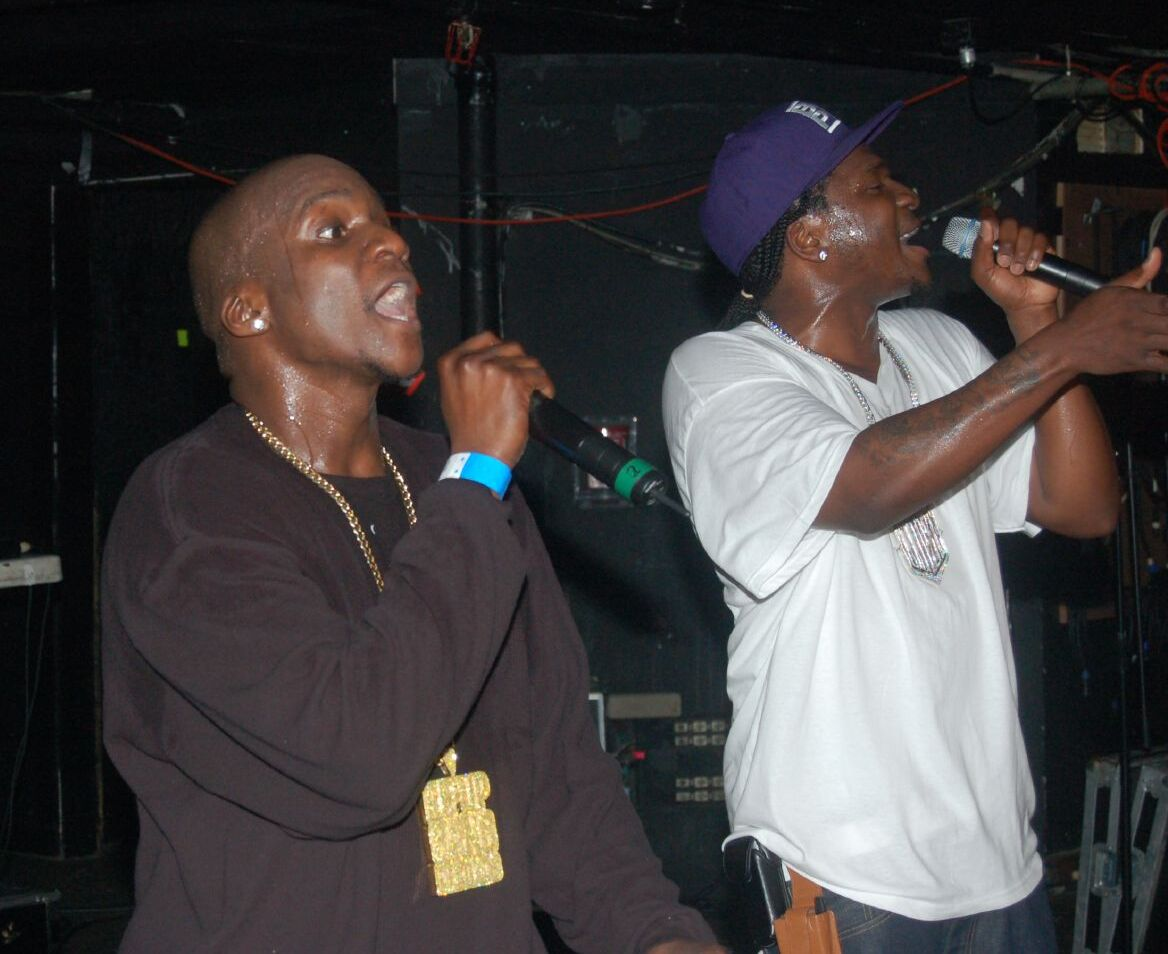
- Let God Sort Em Out by Clipse is the most recent recipient
- Country: United States
- Presented by: BET Awards
- First award: 2017
- Currently held by: Clipse – Let God Sort Em Out (2026)

Highlights
- Most wins: Beyoncé and Kendrick Lamar (2)
- Most nominations: Beyoncé (5)

The BET Award for Album of the Year is given to the most popular album released the same or previous year of the year the awards are handed out. The award is only given to the headlining artist(s) or group of the album. Beyoncé received five nominations in this category, the most for any artist, including a nomination with her husband Jay-Z as the supergroup THE CARTERS.

== Winners and nominees ==
Winners are listed first and highlighted in bold.

=== 2010s ===
Year	Artist	Album	Ref
2017
2017	**Beyoncé**	**Lemonade**	
2017	Chance the Rapper	Coloring Book	
2017	J. Cole	4 Your Eyez Only	
2017	Bruno Mars	24K Magic	
2017	Solange	A Seat at the Table	
2018
2018	**Kendrick Lamar**	**Damn**	
2018	DJ Khaled	Grateful	
2018	Migos	Culture II	
2018	SZA	Ctrl	
2018	Jay-Z	4:44	
2018	Kendrick Lamar & various artists	Black Panther: The Album	
2019
2019	**Cardi B**	**Invasion of Privacy**	
2019	Travis Scott	Astroworld	
2019	Meek Mill	Championships	
2019	Ella Mai	Ella Mai	
2019	The Carters	Everything Is Love	

=== 2020s ===
Year	Artist	Album	Ref
2020
2020	**Roddy Ricch**	**Please Excuse Me For Being Antisocial**	
2020	Beyoncé	Homecoming: The Live Album	
2020	DaBaby	Kirk	
2020	H.E.R.	I Used to Know Her	
2020	Lizzo	Cuz I Love You	
2020	Megan Thee Stallion	Fever	
2021
2021	**Jazmine Sullivan**	**Heaux Tales**	
2021	The Weeknd	After Hours	
2021	DaBaby	Blame It on Baby	
2021	Megan Thee Stallion	Good News	
2021	Nas	King's Disease	
2021	Chloe x Halle	Ungodly Hour	
2022
2022	**Silk Sonic**	**An Evening with Silk Sonic**	
2022	H.E.R.	Back of My Mind	
2022	Tyler, the Creator	Call Me If You Get Lost	
2022	Drake	Certified Lover Boy	
2022	Kanye West	Donda	
2022	Jazmine Sullivan	Heaux Tales, Mo' Tales: The Deluxe	
2022	Doja Cat	Planet Her	
2023
2023	**Beyoncé**	**Renaissance**	
2023	**SZA**	**SOS**	
2023	GloRilla	Anyways, Life's Great	
2023	Chris Brown	Breezy	
2023	DJ Khaled	God Did	
2023	Drake & 21 Savage	Her Loss	
2023	Kendrick Lamar	Mr. Morale & the Big Steppers	
2024
2024	**Killer Mike**	**Michael**	
2024	Chris Brown	11:11	
2024	Gunna	A Gift & a Curse	
2024	21 Savage	American Dream	
2024	Usher	Coming Home	
2024	Drake	For All the Dogs Scary Hours Edition	
2024	Victoria Monét	Jaguar II	
2024	Nicki Minaj	Pink Friday 2	
2025
2025	**Kendrick Lamar**	**GNX**	
2025	Chris Brown	11:11 (Deluxe)	
2025	Doechii	Alligator Bites Never Heal	
2025	Beyoncé	Cowboy Carter	
2025	GloRilla	Glorious	
2025	The Weeknd	Hurry Up Tomorrow	
2025	Drake & PartyNextDoor	Some Sexy Songs 4 U	
2025	Future & Metro Boomin	We Don't Trust You	
2026
2026	**Clipse**	**Let God Sort Em Out**	
2026	Cardi B	Am I the Drama?	
2026	Tyler, the Creator	Don't Tap the Glass	
2026	Wale	Everything Is a Lot	
2026	Mariah the Scientist	Hearts Sold Separately	
2026	Leon Thomas	Mutt Deluxe: Heel	
2026	J. Cole	The Fall-Off	
2026	Bruno Mars	The Romantic	

== Multiple wins and nominations ==
=== Wins ===
2 wins

- Beyoncé
- Kendrick Lamar

=== Nominations ===
5 nominations

- Beyoncé (including credit as The Carters)

4 nominations

- Drake
- Kendrick Lamar

3 nominations

- Chris Brown
- Bruno Mars (including credit as Silk Sonic)

2 nominations

- Cardi B
- DaBaby
- DJ Khaled
- GloRilla
- H.E.R.
- Jay-Z (including credit as The Carters)
- J. Cole
- Megan Thee Stallion
- Jazmine Sullivan
- SZA
- 21 Savage
- Tyler, the Creator
- The Weeknd
