= Soul Train Awards 2026 =

Music awards ceremony in Chicago, US

- Awarded for: Music
- Date: November 27, 2026
- Venue: Harris Theater, Chicago, Illinois
- Country: United States
- Hosted by: Anthony Anderson

Highlights
- Most nominations: Tems (2)
- Website: bet.com

Television/radio coverage
- Network: BET; CBS; BET Her; VH1; MTV2; LOGO

The 2026 ceremony of the Soul Train Music Awards was held at the Harris Theater in Chicago, Illinois on November 5, 2026. It will be broadcast live on BET and simulcast on CBS on November 27, 2026. The show will be hosted by actor, comedian, and television host Anthony Anderson. Since the "Soul Train" television show originated in Chicago, hosting the awards ceremony was seen as a celebration of its roots and marked the first nationally broadcast awards show to be held in Chicago.

== Winners and nominees ==
=== Fan-voted categories ===
The first round of nominees were announced October 5, 2026. For the first time, fans will determine who takes home the awards in two categories: R&B/soul song of the year, and Spotify's RNB X international artist.

R&B/Soul Song of The Year: Brent Faiyaz – Butterflies; Bruno Mars – I Just Might; Chris Brown and Bryson Tiller – It Depends; Daniel Caesar – Who Knows; Justin Bieber – Yukon; Kehlani – Folded; Mariah the Scientist and Kali Uchis – Is It a Crime; Olivia Dean – Man I Need; Tems – What You Need; Tyla – Chanel	Spotify's RNB X International Artist: Cleo Sol; FLO; kwn; Odeal; PARTYNEXTDOOR; Tems; Tiana Major9

=== Special Awards ===
On October 22 it was announced that Chaka Khan will all be honoured with the Classic Soul Honoree Award. On October 29 the New Soul Honor and the Soul Personified Honor were anounced.

- Classic Soul Honoree Award: Chaka Khan
- New Soul Honor: Elmiene
- Soul Personified Honor: Durand Bernarr

As Common presented Chaka Khan with the Classic Soul Honoree Award, he announced the creation of the Chaka Khan Humanitarian Award, recognizing the work she has done through her foundation.

== Performers ==
Durand Bernarr and Elmiene were anounced as performers on October 29 alongside their respective Honors. Other performers included Kirk Franklin and El DeBarge.Lucky Daye and Muni Long performed their duet “Knockin,” and Chaka Khan closed the show.

Artist	Song
Durand Bernarr	TBA
Elmiene	TBA
