= Chxrry =

Canadian singer and songwriter

- Born: Lydia Habtemariam; Toronto, Ontario, Canada
- Genres: R&B, pop
- Occupations: Singer, songwriter
- Years active: 2022–present
- Labels: XO; Republic

Lydia Habtemariam, known professionally as Chxrry and previously Chxrry22, is a Canadian singer and songwriter. The first woman signed to The Weeknd's XO record label, she released her debut EP, The Other Side, in September 2022 and her debut album, U, Me & My Ego, in May 2026.

== Early life ==
Lydia Habtemariam was born and raised in Scarborough, Ontario to Ethiopian immigrants. Habtemariam grew up singing at home, in church and at gatherings while parents both sang in a choir. She briefly attended York University but did not graduate.

== Career ==
Habtemariam moved to Atlanta in 2017 to pursue her music career. In 2018, a cover of "Work" by Rihanna by Habtemariam went viral on Instagram, leading to attention from record labels. She recorded her first song, "My Love", shortly after. Under the stagename of Chxrry22, she released her debut EP, The Other Side, in September 2022. Her EP Siren released on October 27, 2023, featuring appearances from Vory and Offset. On August 23, 2024, she released her single "Poppin Out (Mistakes)". She released her final single under Chxrry22, "Just Like Me", on February 21, 2025,

Habtemariam changed her stagename from Chxrry22 to Chxrry on April 16, 2025. She had begun teasing what would soon be her next single, "Main Character", the month prior on various social media platforms, generating interest in the single and her artistry. "Main Character" released as a single on May 30, 2025. The song remains one of her most streamed singles, receiving three separate music videos: the original was directed by Dylan Reid, the second by Montreality, and the third, officially released video was directed by Mowalola. The original video by Dylan Reid was only teased, but the sailor hat motifs used in the teasers would become associated with Habtemariam's look. "Main Character" marked the beginning of her album rollout for U, Me & My Ego. On May 29, 2026, she released her debut album, U, Me & My Ego. It features appearances from Mariah the Scientist and Cash Cobain.

In 2024, she supported the Oceania leg of the Weeknd's After Hours til Dawn Tour and Mariah the Scientist's To Be Eaten Alive Tour. She featured on the Weeknd song "Reflections Laughing", and in the music video for "Cry for Me" from his January 2025 album Hurry Up Tomorrow. She supported the 2025 North American leg for Flo's Access All Areas Tour. and the 2026 European leg for Mariah the Scientist's Hearts Sold Separately Tour. It features appearances from Mariah the Scientist and Cash Cobain. She embarked on The Ego Tour, her debut solo headlining tour, in support of the album in August and September 2026 in North America and Europe; it sold out. She later announced the deluxe version of U, Me & My Ego, set to be released on November 6th, 2026 with an appearance from Rema.

== Artistry ==
Habtemariam's music is primarily R&B and pop. She has cited Lana Del Rey and Rihanna as influences on her music.

== Discography ==
=== Studio albums ===
Title	Details
U, Me & My Ego	Released: May 29, 2026; Label: XO, Republic; Format: streaming, digital download

=== Extended Plays ===
Title	Details
The Other Side	Released: September 28, 2022; Label: XO, Republic; Format: streaming, digital download
Siren	Released: October 27, 2023; Label: XO, Republic; Format: streaming, digital download,

=== Singles ===
Title	Year	Album
"The Falls"	2022	The Other Side
"Call Me"	2022	The Other Side
"Sacrifice"	2022	Non-album single
"Wasteland"	2022	The Other Side
"Worlds Away"	2023	Non-album single
"More"	2023	Siren
"Never Had This"	2023	Siren
"Poppin Out (Mistakes)"	2024	Non-album singles
"Just Like Me"	2024	Non-album singles
"Main Character"	2025	U, Me & My Ego
"Groupie"	2025	U, Me & My Ego
"Hall of Fame"	2026	U, Me & My Ego
"Bottles & Lights" (featuring Mariah The Scientist)	2026	U, Me & My Ego
"Big Shot" (featuring Rema)	2026	U, Me & My Ego (Deluxe)
