= BET Awards 2017 =

American entertainment awards ceremony

17th BET Awards
- Date: June 25, 2017
- Location: Microsoft Theater, Los Angeles, California
- Presented by: Black Entertainment Television
- Hosted by: Leslie Jones

Highlights
- Most awards: Beyoncé (5)
- Most nominations: Beyoncé (7)
- Website: www.bet.com/shows/bet-awards.html

Television/radio coverage
- Network: BET & Centric (simulcast partners); Comedy Central; MTV; MTV2; Spike; VH1; Logo TV
- Runtime: 3:02:45

The 17th BET Awards was held at the Microsoft Theater in Los Angeles, California on June 25, 2017. The ceremony celebrated achievements in entertainment and honors music, sports, television, and movies released between April 1, 2016 and March 31, 2017. The nominations were announced on May 15, 2017; Beyoncé led the nominees with 7, followed by Bruno Mars with 5. Beyoncé won the most awards with 5, including Album of the Year and Video of the Year.

== Performances ==
Artist(s)	Song(s)
Main show
Bruno Mars	"Perm"
French Montana; Swae Lee	"Unforgettable"
Post Malone; Quavo	"Congratulations"
Migos	"T-Shirt" "Bad and Boujee"
Jessie Reyez	"Figures"
Trey Songz	"Nobody Else But You" "Animal"
Chris Brown; Gucci Mane	"Privacy" "Party"
Mary J. Blige; A$AP Rocky	"Set Me Free" "Love Yourself"
Big Sean	"Sacrifices" "Moves" "Bounce Back"
Khalid	"Location"
Xscape	"Understanding" "Just Kickin' It" "Who Can I Run To"
Future; Kendrick Lamar	"Mask Off" (Remix)
Tamar Braxton	"My Man"
Maxwell	"Gods"
Roman GianArthur	Tribute to Chuck Berry "Johnny B. Goode"
Kamasi Washington; El Debarge	Tribute to George Michael "Careless Whisper"
The New Edition Story; Miniseries Cast	Tribute to New Edition "Candy Girl" "Sensitivity" (Ralph Tresvant) Performed by Algee Smith "My, My, My" (Johnny Gill) Performed by Luke James "My Prerogative" (Bobby Brown) Performed by Woody Mcclain "Poison" (Bell Biv Devoe) Performed by Elijah Kelley, Bryshere Gray, and Keith Powers
New Edition	"Mr. Telephone Man" "Can You Stand the Rain" "If It Isn't Love"
SZA	"Love Galore" "The Weekend"
DJ Khaled; Quavo; Chance the Rapper; Lil Wayne	"I'm The One"

== Presenters ==
- Solange
- Yara Shahidi
- Cardi B
- Issa Rae
- Jamie Foxx
- Lil' Kim and Havoc (tribute to Prodigy)
- La La Anthony
- The Cast of Girls Trip (Regina Hall, Tiffany Haddish, with Jada Pinkett Smith and Queen Latifah)
- Nomzamo Mbatha
- Eva Marcille
- Robin Thede
- Trevor Noah
- Demetrius Shipp Jr.
- Logan Browning
- Cari Champion
- Deon Cole
- Remy Ma
- Irv Gotti
- The Cast of Detroit (Algee Smith, Jason Mitchell, Laz Alonso and Jacob Latimore)
- DeRay Davis
- Karrueche Tran
- Too Short

== Winners and nominations ==
Winners highlighted in Bold

Album of the Year	Video of the Year
**Lemonade – Beyoncé**; 24K Magic – Bruno Mars; 4 Your Eyez Only – J. Cole; A Seat at the Table – Solange; Coloring Book – Chance the Rapper	**Beyoncé – "Sorry" (tie)**; **Bruno Mars – "24K Magic" (tie)**; Big Sean - "Bounce Back"; Migos featuring Lil Uzi Vert – "Bad and Boujee"; Solange – "Cranes in the Sky"
Coca-Cola Viewers' Choice Award	Best New Artist
**Beyoncé – "Sorry"**; Bruno Mars – "24K Magic"; Drake – "Fake Love"; Migos featuring Lil Uzi Vert – "Bad and Boujee"; Rae Sremmurd featuring Gucci Mane – "Black Beatles"; The Weeknd featuring Daft Punk – "Starboy"	**Chance the Rapper**; 21 Savage; Cardi B; Khalid; Young M.A.
Best Female R&B/Pop Artist	Best Male R&B/Pop Artist
**Beyoncé**; Kehlani; Mary J. Blige; Rihanna; Solange	**Bruno Mars**; Chris Brown; The Weeknd; Trey Songz; Usher
Best Female Hip Hop Artist	Best Male Hip Hop Artist
**Remy Ma**; Cardi B; Missy Elliott; Nicki Minaj; Young M.A	**Kendrick Lamar**; Big Sean; Chance the Rapper; Drake; Future; J. Cole
Best Duo/Group	
**Migos**; 2 Chainz & Lil Wayne; A Tribe Called Quest; Fat Joe & Remy Ma; Rae Sremmurd	
Best Collaboration	BET Centric Award
**Chance the Rapper featuring 2 Chainz & Lil Wayne – "No Problem" (tie)**; **Migos featuring Lil Uzi Vert - "Bad and Boujee" (tie)**; Beyoncé featuring Kendrick Lamar – "Freedom"; Chris Brown featuring Gucci Mane & Usher – "Party"; DJ Khaled featuring Beyoncé & Jay Z – "Shining"; Rae Sremmurd featuring Gucci Mane - "Black Beatles"	**Solange – "Cranes in the Sky"**; Fantasia – "Sleeping with the One I Love"; Kehlani – "Distraction"; Mary J. Blige – "Thick of It"; Syd – "All About Me"; Yuna featuring Usher - "Crush"
Video Director of the Year	Dr. Bobby Jones Best Gospel/Inspirational Award
**Kahlil Joseph & Beyoncé Knowles-Carter (Beyoncé – "Sorry")**; Benny Boom (Kehlani – "CRZY"); Bruno Mars & Jonathan Lia (Bruno Mars – "That's What I Like"); Director X (Zayn Malik – "Like I Would"); Hype Williams (Tyga featuring Desiigner – "Gucci Snakes")	**Lecrae – "Can't Stop Me Now (Destination)"**; CeCe Winans – "Never Have to Be Alone"; Fantasia featuring Tye Tribbett – "I Made It"; Kirk Franklin featuring Sarah Reeves, Tasha Cobbs & Tamela Mann – "My World Needs You"; Tamela Mann – "God Provides"
Best Actress	Best Actor
**Taraji P. Henson**; Gabrielle Union; Issa Rae; Janelle Monáe; Viola Davis	**Mahershala Ali**; Bryshere Y. Gray; Denzel Washington; Donald Glover; Omari Hardwick
YoungStars Award	Best Movie
**Yara Shahidi**; Ace Hunter; Caleb McLaughlin; Jaden Smith; Marsai Martin	**Hidden Figures**; Get Out; Moonlight; Fences; The Birth of a Nation
Sportswoman of the Year	Sportsman of the Year
**Serena Williams**; Gabrielle Douglas; Simone Biles; Skylar Diggins; Venus Williams	**Stephen Curry**; LeBron James; Cam Newton; Odell Beckham Jr.; Russell Westbrook
Best International Act: Europe	Best International Act: Africa
**Stormzy (UK)**; Skepta (UK); Giggs (UK); Craig David (UK); Wiley (UK); Emeli Sandé (UK); MHD (France); Booba (France)	**Wizkid (Nigeria)**; Tekno (Nigeria); Mr Eazi (Nigeria); Davido (Nigeria); Stonebwoy (Ghana); AKA (SA); Nasty C (SA); Babes Wodumo (SA)
International Viewers' Choice Award
**Rayvanny (Tanzania)**; Jorja Smith (UK); Dave (UK); Changmo (South Korea); Daniel Caesar (Canada); Amanda Black (SA); Remi (Australia); Skip Marley (Jamaica)

== Special awards ==
- Lifetime Achievement Award: New Edition
- Humanitarian Award: Chance the Rapper
- Global Good Power Award: Yvonne Chaka Chaka
