= BET Awards 2019 =

American entertainment awards ceremony

2019 BET Awards
- Date: June 23, 2019
- Location: Microsoft Theater, Los Angeles, California
- Presented by: Black Entertainment Television
- Hosted by: Regina Hall

Highlights
- Most awards: Cardi B (2)
- Most nominations: Cardi B (7)
- Website: http://www.bet.com/shows/bet-awards.html

Television/radio coverage
- Network: BET Simulcasts: BET Her; VH1; MTV; MTV2; MTV Classic; Logo TV; TV Land; BET International
- Directed by: Glenn Weiss

The 19th BET Awards were held on June 23, 2019 at Microsoft Theater in Los Angeles, California. The ceremony celebrated achievements in entertainment and honors music, sports, television, and movies. Cardi B received the most nominations with seven, and won the most awards with two, including for Album of the Year.

On May 29, 2019, it was announced that the ceremony would be hosted for the first time by actress Regina Hall. On June 13, 2019, it was announced that special awards would be presented to Mary J. Blige, who received the 2019 Lifetime Achievement Award; Tyler Perry, who was given the Ultimate Icon Award; and Nipsey Hussle, who was posthumously honored with the Humanitarian Award.

== Performers ==
| Artist(s) | Song(s) |
Main show
| Cardi B Offset | "Clout" "Press" |
| DaBaby | "Suge" |
| Fantasia | "Enough" |
| Lucky Daye | "Roll Some Mo" |
| Lizzo | "Truth Hurts" |
| Lil Nas X Billy Ray Cyrus | "Old Town Road" |
| City Girls | "Act Up" |
| Lil Baby | "Close Friends" "Pure Cocaine" |
| H.E.R. YBN Cordae | "Lord Is Coming" |
| Mustard; Migos | "Pure Water" |
| Mary J. Blige | Medley: 1. "My Life"; 2. "No More Drama"; 3. "I'm Goin' Down"; 4. "Real Love (Remix)"; 5. "Reminisce (Remix)"; 6. "You Remind Me (Remix)"; 7. "Be Happy"; 8. "Love No Limit"; 9. "I Can Love You" (with Lil' Kim); 10. "I'll Be There for You/You're All I Need to Get By" (with Method Man); 11. "Just Fine" |
| DJ Khaled; Meek Mill; Lil Baby; Jeremih | "Weather the Storm" "You Stay" |
| Kiana Ledé | "Ex" |
| Kirk Franklin; Jonathan McReynolds; Erica Campbell; Kelly Price | "Love Theory" |
| Marsha Ambrosius; YG; DJ Khaled; John Legend | Tribute to Nipsey Hussle "Real Big" "Last Time That I'd Checc'd" "Higher" |

== Presenters ==
The first wave was announced on June 3, 2019.

- Yara Shahidi – presented Best New Artist
- Irv Gotti, Justine Skye & Elijah Kelley – presented Young Stars Award
- Regina Hall – introduced Fantasia
- Raphael Saadiq – introduced Lucky Daye
- Anderson .Paak – presented Album of the Year
- Amanda Seales – presented Shine a Light to Candice Payne
- Rev. Al Sharpton – presented Dr. Bobby Jones Gospel Inspirational Award
- Larenz Tate & La La Anthony – presented Best Movie
- Jodie Turner-Smith, Melina Matsoukas, and Lena Waithe – introduced world premiere trailer for Queen & Slim
- Marsai Martin – presented Best Actress
- Rihanna – presented Lifetime Achievement Award to Mary J. Blige
- Ayesha Curry & Ne-Yo – presented Best International Act
- Jacob Latimore – presented Coca-Cola Viewer's Choice Award
- Taraji P. Henson – presented Ultimate Icon Award to Tyler Perry
- Morris Chestnut & Damson Idris – Eulogy for John Singleton
- T.I. – presented Humanitarian Award to the family of Nipsey Hussle

== Nominations ==
Winners highlighted in Bold.

| Album of the Year | Video of the Year |
|---|---|
| **Invasion of Privacy – Cardi B**; ASTROWORLD – Travis Scott; Championships – Meek Mill; Ella Mai – Ella Mai; Everything Is Love – The Carters | **Childish Gambino – "This Is America"**; Cardi B – "Money"; Cardi B and Bruno Mars – "Please Me"; 21 Savage featuring J. Cole - "A Lot"; Drake – "Nice For What"; The Carters – "Apeshit" |
| Coca-Cola Viewers' Choice Award | Best Collaboration |
| **Ella Mai** – **"Trip"**; Childish Gambino – "This Is America"; Drake – "In My Feelings"; Cardi B, Bad Bunny & J Balvin – "I Like It"; J. Cole – "Middle Child"; Travis Scott featuring Drake – "Sicko Mode" | **Travis Scott** featuring **Drake** – **"Sicko Mode"**; Cardi B and Bruno Mars – "Please Me"; Cardi B, Bad Bunny & J Balvin – "I Like It"; H.E.R. featuring Bryson Tiller – "Could've Been"; 21 Savage featuring J. Cole – "A Lot"; Tyga featuring Offset – "Taste" |
| Best Female R&B/Pop Artist | Best Male R&B/Pop Artist |
| **Beyoncé**; Ella Mai; H.E.R.; Solange; SZA; Teyana Taylor | **Bruno Mars**; Anderson .Paak; Childish Gambino; Chris Brown; John Legend; Khalid |
| Best Female Hip Hop Artist | Best Male Hip Hop Artist |
| **Cardi B**; Megan Thee Stallion; Lizzo; Remy Ma; Kash Doll; Nicki Minaj | **Nipsey Hussle**; 21 Savage; Drake; J. Cole; Meek Mill; Travis Scott |
| Best Group | Best New Artist |
| **Migos**; City Girls; Chloe x Halle; Lil Baby and Gunna; The Carters | **Lil Baby**; Blueface; City Girls; Juice Wrld; Queen Naija |
| Dr. Bobby Jones Best Gospel/Inspirational Award | BET Her Award |
| **Snoop Dogg featuring Rance Allen – "Blessing Me Again"**; Erica Campbell featuring Warryn Campbell – "All of My Life"; Fred Hammond – "Tell Me Where It Hurts"; Kirk Franklin – "Love Theory"; Tori Kelly featuring Kirk Franklin – "Never Alone" | **H.E.R. – "Hard Place"**; Alicia Keys – "Raise a Man"; Ciara – "Level Up"; Janelle Monae – "Pynk"; Queen Naija – "Mama's Hand"; Teyana Taylor – "Rose In Harlem" |
| Video Director of the Year | Best Movie |
| **Karena Evans**; Benny Boom; Colin Tilley; Dave Meyers; Hype Williams | **BlacKkKlansman**; Creed II; If Beale Street Could Talk; Spider-Man: Into the Spider-Verse; The Hate U Give |
| Best Actress | Best Actor |
| **Regina King**; Issa Rae; Regina Hall; Taraji P. Henson; Tiffany Haddish; Viola Davis | **Michael B. Jordan**; Anthony Anderson; Chadwick Boseman; Denzel Washington; Mahershala Ali; Omari Hardwick |
| YoungStars Award | Sportswoman of the Year |
| **Marsai Martin**; Caleb McLaughlin; Lyric Ross; Michael Rainey Jr.; Miles Brown | **Serena Williams**; Allyson Felix; Candace Parker; Naomi Osaka; Simone Biles |
| Sportsman of the Year | Best International Act |
| **Stephen Curry**; Kevin Durant; LeBron James; Odell Beckham Jr.; Tiger Woods | **Burna Boy (Nigeria)**; Aya Nakamura (France); AKA (South Africa); Dave (UK); Dosseh (France); Giggs (UK); Mr Eazi (Nigeria) |
Best New International Act
**Sho Madjozi (South Africa)**; Headie One (UK); Jok'Air (France); Nesly (France); Octavian (UK); Teniola Apata (Nigeria)

== Special awards ==
Lifetime Achievement Award: Mary J. Blige

Humanitarian Award: Nipsey Hussle

Ultimate Icon Award: Tyler Perry

== Records Set ==
Bruno Mars became the first person to win Best Male R&B/Pop Artist three years in a row. Migos became the first group or duo to win Best Group three years in a row. Serena Williams won Sportswoman of the Year for the 12th time; the sixth year in a row. Beyoncé won Best Female R&B/Pop Artist for the 10th time; the sixth year in a row.
