= Akia =

Akia or AKIA may refer to:

== Places ==
=== North America ===
- Akia Island, an island in northwestern Greenland
- Akia, a neighborhood of Sisimiut, Greenland

== People ==
- Akia Guerrier (born 1998), sprinter from the Turks and Caicos Islands

== Organizations ==
- Aircraft Kit Industry Association, abbreviated as AKIA
- AKIA, a secret greeting of the Ku Klux Klan

== Other uses ==
- Rescue toboggan or akia, a transport device for goods and people on snow and ice
- Wikstroemia oahuensis, a Hawaiian plant also known as akia shrub, ʻākia, or Oʻahu false ohelo

== See also ==
- Aki (disambiguation)
- Akia terrane
- Akiya
