= Akiya =

Akiya (秋谷) is a Japanese surname. Akiya can also mean an abandoned, vacant house (空き家).

Notable people with the surname include:

- Einosuke Akiya (秋谷 栄之助; born 1930), Japanese Buddhist leader
- Karl Ichiro Akiya (1909–2001), Japanese-American activist, Communist, author, and internee
- Tomoko Akiya (秋谷 智子; born 1976), Japanese voice actor

Akiya is also a masculine Japanese given name. Notable people with the name include:

- Akiya Anzawa (安沢 明也; born 1981), Japanese retired professional wrestler.
- Akiya Takahashi (高橋 明也; born 1953), Japanese art historian

== See also ==
- Akiya (Assyrian king), an Assyrian king of the old Assyrian period
