= BET Awards 2007 =

American entertainment awards ceremony

7th BET Awards
- Date: June 26, 2007
- Location: Shrine Auditorium, Los Angeles, California
- Presented by: Black Entertainment Television
- Hosted by: Mo'Nique

Television/radio coverage
- Network: BET

The 7th BET Awards took place at the Shrine Auditorium in Los Angeles, California on June 26, 2007. The awards recognized Americans in music, acting, sports, and other fields of entertainment over the past year. Comedian Mo'Nique hosted the awards for the third time.

== Nominees and winners ==
Video of the Year	Viewers' Choice
"Irreplaceable" (Beyoncé); "I Wanna Love You" (Akon feat. Snoop Dogg); "Beautiful Liar" (Beyoncé & Shakira); "Like a Boy" (Ciara); "Crazy" (Gnarls Barkley)	Birdman and Lil Wayne – "Stuntin' Like My Daddy"; Robin Thicke – "Lost Without U"; Ciara – "Promise"; Bow Wow and Chris Brown – "Shortie Like Mine"; Unk – "Walk It Out"; Ne-Yo – "Because of You"; Beyoncé – "Irreplaceable"
Best Collaboration	Best Male Hip Hop Artist
Ludacris feat. Mary J. Blige – "Runaway Love"; Beyoncé feat. Jay-Z – "Déjà Vu"; Beyoncé feat. Jay-Z – "Upgrade U"; Diddy feat. Keyshia Cole - "Last Night"; Akon feat. Snoop Dogg – "I Wanna Love You"	T.I.; Lil Wayne; Jay-Z; Sean Combs; Ludacris
Best Female R&B/Pop Artist	Best Male R&B/Pop Artist
Beyoncé; Jennifer Hudson; Corinne Bailey Rae; Mary J Blige; Ciara	Ne-Yo; Akon; Robin Thicke; Gerald Levert; John Legend
Best Group	Best Gospel Artist
Gnarls Barkley; Mary Mary; OutKast; Pretty Ricky; Three 6 Mafia	Kirk Franklin; Shirley Caesar; Mary Mary; Fred Hammond; Dave Hollister
Best New Artist	BET Centric Award
Jennifer Hudson; Lupe Fiasco; Gnarls Barkley; Mims; Corinne Bailey Rae	Gerald Levert; Eric Roberson; Musiq; Brian McKnight; Elisabeth Withers
Best Actress	Best Actor
Jennifer Hudson; Tichina Arnold; Chandra Wilson; Angela Bassett; Kerry Washington	Forest Whitaker; Will Smith; Jamie Foxx; Eddie Murphy; Idris Elba
Sportswoman of the Year	Sportsman of the Year
Serena Williams; Swin Cash; Tamika Catchings; Lisa Leslie; Gail Devers	LeBron James; Reggie Bush; Floyd Mayweather Jr.; Dwyane Wade; Tiger Woods
Lifetime Achievement Award	Humanitarian Award
Diana Ross	Don Cheadle
