= Sacrifice (Mariah the Scientist song) =

2025 song by Mariah the Scientist

Song by Mariah the Scientist

from the album Hearts Sold Separately
- Released: August 22, 2025
- Genre: R&B
- Length: 3:18
- Label: Buckles Laboratories; Epic
- Songwriters: Mariah Buckles; Paul Jefferies
- Producer: Nineteen85

"Sacrifice" is a song by American singer-songwriter Mariah the Scientist from her fourth studio album, Hearts Sold Separately (2025). It was produced by Nineteen85.

== Background ==
Mariah the Scientist wrote the song a year after her boyfriend, rapper Young Thug, was incarcerated on RICO charges.

== Composition ==
"Sacrifice" is an R&B song that incorporates elements of 1980s synth-pop with a "sultry edge". Mariah the Scientist sings about handling the stress of being separated from her lover, feeling somewhat hopeless but remaining patient.

== Critical reception ==
In her review of Hearts Sold Separately, Elaina Bernstein of Hypebeast wrote "'Sacrifice' starts it off strong, a more confident Mariah ushering in her confident new era. Her strength bleeds through the entire album. She knows what she wants to say, and she's saying it."

== Charts ==
Chart performance for "Sacrifice"
Chart (2025)	Peak position
New Zealand Hot Singles (RMNZ)	40
US Billboard Hot 100	88
US Hot R&B/Hip-Hop Songs (Billboard)	20
