= Hearts Sold Separately =

2025 studio album by Mariah the Scientist

- Standard cover

Studio album by Mariah the Scientist
- Released: August 22, 2025
- Genres: R&B; synth-pop
- Length: 35:09
- Labels: Buckles Laboratories; Epic
- Producers: Rogét Chahayed; Oliver Easton; Jay Rewind; Jetski Purp; Kospel; London on da Track; Mat1k; Nez; Nineteen85; Victrue

Mariah the Scientist chronology
To Be Eaten Alive (2023)	Hearts Sold Separately (2025)

Singles from Hearts Sold Separately
- 1. "Burning Blue" Released: May 2, 2025; 2. "Is It a Crime" Released: July 31, 2025

Hearts Sold Separately is the fourth studio album by American singer-songwriter Mariah the Scientist. It was released on August 22, 2025, through Buckles Laboratories and Epic Records, following her 2023 album To Be Eaten Alive. The album was preceded by the singles "Burning Blue" and "Is It a Crime", the latter featuring Kali Uchis.

The album received generally favorable reviews from music critics and debuted at number 11 on the US Billboard 200. It was supported by the Hearts Sold Separately Tour, which visited Europe and North America in 2026.

== Background and promotion ==
In an interview at the Billboard Women in Music event on March 29, 2025, Mariah the Scientist said that she had completed her fourth studio album. On July 8, she announced the album's title and August 22 release date. The announcement included the album artwork, which depicts a miniature green toy soldier against a pink background. Mariah described the album's concept in terms of a "war on love".

"Burning Blue" was released on May 2, 2025, as the album's lead single. Produced by Jetski Purp and Nineteen85, the song incorporates imagery of fire and ice in its lyrics. It debuted at number 25 on the US Billboard Hot 100, becoming Mariah's highest-charting single in the United States at the time. Its music video was released on May 10, 2025. On June 2, 2025, she made her late-night television debut with a performance of "Burning Blue" on Jimmy Kimmel Live!. Mariah performed "Burning Blue", among other songs, at the Essence Festival of Culture on July 5. The second single, "Is It a Crime", featuring Kali Uchis, was released on July 31, 2025.

Additional festival appearances included the Lollapalooza on August 3, and All Points East on August 15. On September 16, she performed "Rainy Days" and "Burning Blue" on The Tonight Show Starring Jimmy Fallon. Later that month, she performed at the Global Citizen Festival in Central Park, New York City, on September 27. On December 13, Mariah headlined Power 105.1's Power Sessions at the Hammerstein Ballroom in New York City.

=== Tour ===
On September 15, 2025, Mariah announced the Hearts Sold Separately Tour in support of the album. Produced by Live Nation, the tour was initially announced as a 36-city tour beginning in Paris on January 12, 2026. The European leg included dates in the United Kingdom and the Netherlands before the North American leg began in Miami Beach, Florida, on February 13. Additional dates were added in several cities, including London, Utrecht, Miami Beach, Orlando, Toronto, Los Angeles and Atlanta. The Chesterfield, Missouri, performance was rescheduled from March 15 to March 16, 2026.

4Batz and Akia appeared as supporting acts on select North American dates. Chxrry joined the tour for select European performances.

== Critical reception ==
Professional ratings
Review scores
Source	Rating
AllMusic	3.5/5 stars
Pitchfork	7.7/10

Hearts Sold Separately received generally favorable reviews from music critics, although some reviewers offered more mixed assessments. Andy Kellman of AllMusic awarded the album three and a half stars out of five. He described it as being "strictly in ballad mode", noting that its songs explore romantic anguish. AllMusic later included the album among its favorite R&B albums of 2025. Wongo Okon of Pitchfork rated the album 7.7 out of 10, describing it as a progression from To Be Eaten Alive and praising its improved production and songwriting. He noted that the album "levels up her sound" and concluded that "her pen is her best weapon". Elaina Bernstein of Hypebeast described the album as a new high in Mariah's career. Bernstein discussed its central concept, which revolves around what the singer called the "war on love", and its recurring military imagery.

Jill Wannasa of Shatter the Standards rated the album three and a half stars out of five, assigning it a "Solid" rating. She discussed its recurring themes of loyalty, war, and resilience in relationships, praising its subdued vocal performances while observing that Mariah was "not the strongest vocalist". Sanaa Wells, writing for the Hampton University chapter of Her Campus, gave the album 7 out of 10. Wells described it as a "mixed bag", praising its gospel influences while criticizing several aspects of its songwriting as "underdeveloped or overly familiar". She considered the album an uneven follow-up to Mariah's previous work. Zachary Horvath of HotNewHipHop described the record as a collection of 1980s-inspired power ballads, noting the influence of the decade's production styles across the album. He also discussed its emphasis on romantic devotion and its exploration of love as a central theme.

== Commercial performance ==
Hearts Sold Separately debuted at number 11 on the US Billboard 200, with 36,855 album-equivalent units earned during its first week, including 32,737 units from streaming activity. The album debuted at number one on Billboard's Top R&B Albums chart and number three on the Top R&B/Hip-Hop Albums chart. It also reached number eight on Top Streaming Albums, number 15 on Vinyl Albums and number 24 on Top Current Album Sales.

Internationally, the album reached number 73 on Australia's ARIA Albums Chart and number 21 on the ARIA Hip Hop/R&B Albums Chart.

== Track listing ==
Track listing adapted from Apple Music. All lyrics are written by Mariah Buckles, except "Is It a Crime", which was co-written with Karly Loaiza.

No.	Title	Music	Producer(s)	Length
1.	"Sacrifice"	Paul Jefferies	Nineteen85	3:18
2.	"United Nations + 1000 Ways to Die"	Jefferies; Rogét Chahayed; Victor Truta; Lucas Cardi	Nineteen85; Chahayed; Victrue; Kospel	3:45
3.	"Eternal Flame"	Jefferies	Nineteen85	3:33
4.	"Is It a Crime" (with Kali Uchis)	Buckles; Loaiza; Oliver Easton; Matthew Worthem; Jefferies	Easton; Mat1k; Nineteen85^{[a]}; Austen Jux-Chandler^{[b]}; Treedott^{[b]}	3:01
5.	"Burning Blue"	Buckles	Nineteen85; Jetski Purp	3:26
6.	"All I Want + In Pursuit"	Jefferies	Nineteen85	4:01
7.	"More"	Jefferies; Jason Kellner; Anand Joshi	Nineteen85; Jay Century^{[a]}; Ajax^{[a]}	3:19
8.	"Rainy Days"	Jefferies; Kenneth Vaughn Jr.	Nineteen85; Jay Rewind	3:32
9.	"Like You Never"	Nesbitt Wesonga Jr.; Jefferies	Nez; Nineteen85^{[a]}	3:31
10.	"No More Entertainers"	Jefferies; London Holmes	Nineteen85; London on da Track	3:43
Total length:				35:09

=== Notes ===
- ^{^[A]} signifies a co-producer.
- ^{^[B]} signifies a vocal producer.

== Credits and personnel ==
Credits adapted from Tidal.

Musicians

- Mariah the Scientist – vocals
- Nineteen85 – drum machine, keyboards (tracks 1, 4); instrumentation (2, 3, 6–9)
- Camille Harris – background vocals (1–3, 7, 8)
- Kim Davis – background vocals (1–3, 7, 8)
- Rogét Chahayed – instrumentation (2)
- Victrue – instrumentation (2)
- Kospel – instrumentation (2)
- Mat1k – drum machine, keyboards (4)
- Oliver Easton – drum machine, keyboards (4)
- Ajax – keyboards (7)
- Jay Century – keyboards (7)
- Jay Rewind – instrumentation (8)
- Nez – instrumentation (9)
- Aaron Manswell – strings (10)

Technical

- Rob Bisel – mixing (1, 5)
- Jimmy Douglass – mixing (2–4, 6–10)
- Chris Gehringer – mastering (1–3, 5, 7–10)
- Mike Bozzi – mastering (4)
- Natalie D'Orlando – engineering
- Tanner "Treedott" Ott – engineering
- Jeff Crake – engineering (1–3, 7–9)
- Jasmine Chen – engineering (4)
- Ken Oriole – engineering (10)
- Walker Steele – mixing assistance (1, 10)

== Charts ==
=== Weekly charts ===
Chart performance for Hearts Sold Separately
Chart (2026)	Peak position
Australian Albums (ARIA)	73
Australian Hip Hop/R&B Albums (ARIA)	13
US Billboard 200	11
US Top R&B/Hip-Hop Albums (Billboard)	3

=== Year-end charts ===
Year-end chart performance for Hearts Sold Separately
Chart (2025)	Position
US Top R&B/Hip-Hop Albums (Billboard)	75

== Certifications ==
Certifications for Hearts Sold Separately
Region	Certification	Certified units/sales
United States (RIAA)	Gold	500,000^{‡}
^{‡} Sales+streaming figures based on certification alone.
