= To Be Eaten Alive =

2023 studio album by Mariah the Scientist

Studio album by Mariah the Scientist
- Released: October 27, 2023
- Genre: R&B
- Length: 27:50
- Label: Buckles Laboratories; Epic
- Producer: 18yoman; Aire Atlantica; AJStayWorkin; Archer; Blueroomsound; Brandosound; Mariah Buckles; DJ Moon; Kaytranada; Kofibae; K Rain; Len20; London on da Track; Natra Average; Nineteen85; Treedot; UV Killinem; Remy Williams; WondaGurl

Mariah the Scientist chronology
| Ry Ry World (2021) | To Be Eaten Alive (2023) | Hearts Sold Separately (2025) |

Singles from To Be Eaten Alive
- 1. "Bout Mine" Released: October 28, 2022; 2. "From a Woman" Released: October 13, 2023; 3. "Out of Luck" Released: November 13, 2023

To Be Eaten Alive is the third studio album by American singer-songwriter Mariah the Scientist. The album was released on October 27, 2023, through Buckles Laboratories and Epic Records. The album features guest appearances from Vory, 21 Savage, and Young Thug with production from herself alongside producers such as 18yoman, Kaytranada, London on da Track, Nineteen85, and WondaGurl, next to several other producers.

== Background ==
Days before the album's release, Mariah's interview with Complex was released, in which she spoke about the album's title:

I'm a Scorpio, so I compare myself to a scorpion. A scorpion, at first glance, it's more meek. It's in the cut, hiding away or something. You don't really know what it's capable of. There are a lot of animals that might have a bright color or something that will be identifiable or a smell that will make you not want to fuck with it. Scorpions don’t really have that, so you don't know what you're gonna get… And then you take another animal such as a lion, right? A lion can eat whatever it wants to eat. It is the king of the jungle. It is top of the food chain. It is great, powerful, big, noble. So the metaphor I came up with was that because it can be poisonous and venomous; if you were to eat it, it would kill you. So to be eaten alive is really to kill.

== Singles ==
On October 28, 2022, "Bout Mine" was released as the lead single from the album. The music video was released a week later on November 4, 2022. The track details "her frustrations about the romantic complications she is experiencing from a nonchalant lover". The second single from the record, "From A Woman", was released almost a year later on October 13, 2023. It was released in tandem with the track, "From A Man", by her boyfriend Young Thug. A promotional single, "Different Pages" was released two days prior to the release of the full project on October 25, 2023. "Out of Luck" began impacting urban contemporary radio as the third and final single from the album on November 13, 2023.

== Critical reception ==
Professional ratings
Review scores
| Source | Rating |
|---|---|
| Pitchfork | 6.3/10 |

Writing for Pitchfork, Jackson Howard wrote that the album "ditches the well-drawn, sometimes-treacly origin stories of her first two full-lengths" and that "in their place is a collection of disappointingly aimless and often impersonal takes on distant love". Howard wrote that throughout the project, Mariah "sounds bored and uninspired, too exhausted by her circumstances to jolt herself awake". Concluding his review, he pointed out the production as the weakest point of the album, writing that "the beats are often the problem [on the album]" and that "the beats on To Be Eaten Alive are mostly plodding and bland, making the album’s 27-minute runtime feel twice as long as it actually is".

== Track listing ==
All tracks are written by Mariah Buckles. Featured artists are credited as co-writers.

To Be Eaten Alive track listing
| No. | Title | Producer(s) | Length |
|---|---|---|---|
| 1. | "Heaven Is a Place on Earth" | Mariah Buckles; Treedot | 2:08 |
| 2. | "Good Times" | Kofibae; Nineteen85 | 2:57 |
| 3. | "From a Woman" | Archer; Blueroomsound; Brandosound; London on da Track; Remy Williams | 3:02 |
| 4. | "40 Days n 40 Nights" (featuring Vory) | K Rain; Nineteen85; Treedot | 3:16 |
| 5. | "Out of Luck" | Kaytranada | 2:55 |
| 6. | "Bout Mine" | WondaGurl | 2:27 |
| 7. | "77 Degrees" (featuring 21 Savage) | Natra Average; Treedot | 2:46 |
| 8. | "Different Pages" | 18yoman; Aire Atlantica; Len20 | 2:26 |
| 9. | "Lovesick" | K Rain; Nineteen85 | 2:53 |
| 10. | "Ride" (featuring Young Thug) | AJStayWorkin; DJ Moon; UV Killinem | 3:00 |
| Total length: | | | 27:50 |

== Personnel ==
- Angad Bains – mastering (tracks 1, 2, 4, 5, 7–10), mixing (1, 2, 4–10)
- Johann Chavez – mastering (3)
- Joe LaPorta – mastering (6)
- Jean-Marie Horvat – mixing (3)
- Aresh Banaji – mastering assistance (1, 2, 4, 5, 7–10)
- Gustavo Sanchez – vocal engineering (10)

== Charts ==
Chart performance for To Be Eaten Alive
| Chart (2023) | Peak position |
|---|---|
| US Billboard 200 | 93 |
| US Top R&B/Hip-Hop Albums (Billboard) | 41 |
