= Is It a Crime (Mariah the Scientist and Kali Uchis song) =

Single by Mariah the Scientist and Kali Uchis

from the album Hearts Sold Separately
- Released: July 31, 2025
- Genre: R&B
- Length: 3:01
- Label: Buckles Laboratories; Epic
- Songwriters: Mariah Buckles; Karly Marina Loaiza
- Producers: Mat1k; Nineteen85; Oliver Easton

Mariah the Scientist singles chronology
"Burning Blue" (2025)	"Is It a Crime" (2025)

Kali Uchis singles chronology
"All I Can Say" (2025)	"Is It a Crime" (2025)	"Cry About It!" (2025)

"Is It a Crime" is a song by American singer-songwriter Mariah the Scientist and Colombian-American singer-songwriter Kali Uchis. It was released on July 31, 2025, as the second single from Mariah's fourth studio album, Hearts Sold Separately.

== Composition ==
"Is It a Crime" is an R&B song with Latin-tinged production that lasts for three minutes and one second long. Lyrically, Mariah and Uchis question whether falling in love again is "a crime", wrestling with the idea of second chances in love. The song’s title and subject deliberately echo Sade's 1985 ballad of the same name: Aaron Williams of Uproxx noted that the duet serves as a homage to classic R&B themes of "forbidden love", even though it does not directly sample the original.

== Music video ==
A music video directed by Claire Bishara was released on October 2, 2025. The video takes place in a courtoom drama setting and features Mariah and Uchis as lawyers and Karrahbooo as a defendant. A news segment reports on protests and riots after arrests made during a "war on love." Karrahbooo appears in court as a defendant, with Mariah as a lawyer pleading their case. Uchis works on the defense team "making calls and pulling strings." The video ends with an open-ended final verdict.

== Critical reception ==
Gabriel Bras Nevares of HotNewHipHop praised the track's "sultry and ethereal" atmosphere and noted that both artists deliver "compelling performances" despite its minimalist production. Nevares also stated that the song "[meets] the expected quality standard" for the R&B genre. In a review for The Source, the track was praised as an "emotional banger", with a critic highlighting the song's "sweet spot between soft confession and bold proclamation" and noting the late-night appeal of its chorus.

== Charts ==
=== Weekly charts ===
Weekly chart performance for "Is It a Crime"
Chart (2025–2026)	Peak position
New Zealand Hot Singles (RMNZ)	10
South Africa Streaming (TOSAC)	16
US Billboard Hot 100	27
US Hot R&B/Hip-Hop Songs (Billboard)	6
US R&B/Hip-Hop Airplay (Billboard)	7
US Rhythmic Airplay (Billboard)	1

=== Year-end charts ===
Year-end chart performance for "Is It a Crime"
Chart (2025)	Position
US Hot R&B/Hip-Hop Songs (Billboard)	77

== Certifications ==
Certifications for "Is It a Crime"
Region	Certification	Certified units/sales
United States (RIAA)	Platinum	1,000,000^{‡}
^{‡} Sales+streaming figures based on certification alone.

== Accolades ==
Award Show	Edition	Category	Result	Ref
BET Awards	2026	Best Collaboration	Nominated	
MTV Video Music Awards	2026	Best R&B	Nominated	
Soul Train Music Awards	2026	R&B/Soul Song of The Year	Nominated	

== Release history ==
Release formats for "Is It a Crime"
Region	Date	Format	Label	Ref.
Various	July 31, 2025	Digital download; streaming	Buckles Laboratories; Epic	
United States	August 5, 2025	Rhythmic contemporary radio	Epic	
