= Mariah the Scientist =

American singer (born 1997)

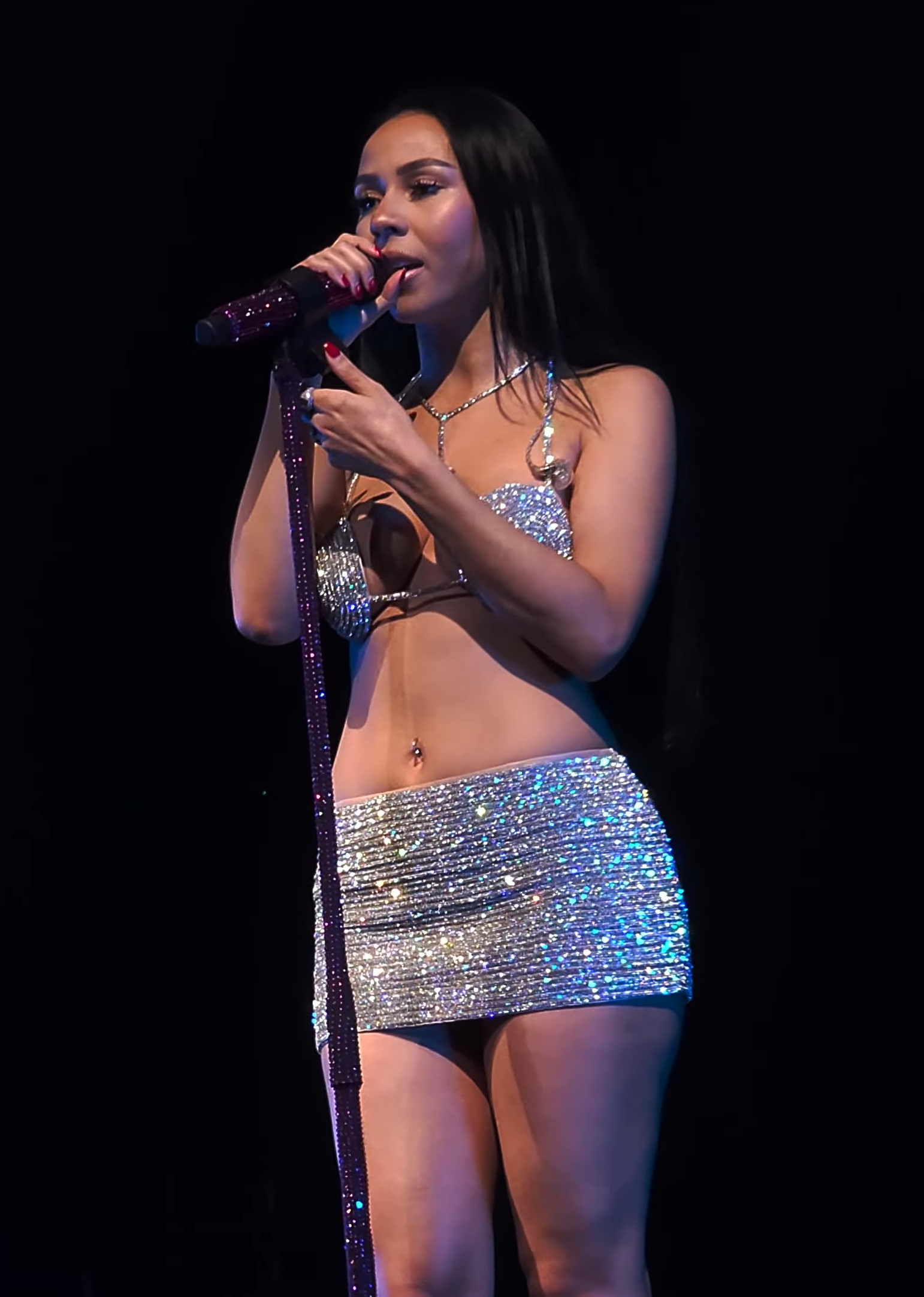
- Mariah the Scientist in 2024

Background information
- Born: Mariah Amani Buckles; October 27, 1997 (age 29); Atlanta, Georgia, U.S.
- Genre: R&B
- Occupations: Singer; songwriter
- Years active: 2018–present
- Labels: Epic (current); One Umbrella; RCA (former)
- Partner(s): Young Thug (2021–present; engaged)
- Website: mariahthescientist.com

Mariah Amani Buckles (born October 27, 1997), known professionally as Mariah the Scientist, is an American singer and songwriter. She signed with Tory Lanez's One Umbrella and RCA Records to release her debut studio album Master (2019) and its follow-up, Ry Ry World (2021). She parted ways with both labels in favor of Epic Records to release her third studio album, To Be Eaten Alive (2023), which marked her first entry on the Billboard 200.

Her 2025 singles, "Burning Blue" and "Is It a Crime" (with Kali Uchis), marked her first entries on the Billboard Hot 100 as a lead artist; they both peaked within its top 30. Both songs preceded her fourth studio album, Hearts Sold Separately (2025).

== Early life ==
Buckles graduated from Southwest DeKalb High School a year early and attended college at St. John's University in New York City in hopes of becoming a pediatric anesthesiologist. However, during her junior year, Buckles dropped out to pursue a music career. She confided only in her mother and chose not to return for her belongings at her dorm, dedicating herself solely to music.

== Career ==
=== 2018–2019: Career beginnings and Master ===
Less than a year after leaving school, Mariah was discovered by Canadian singer Tory Lanez. She later went on to tour with him, while honing her sound in preparation for releasing her debut studio album. She released her debut EP, the six-track To Die For, on SoundCloud in January 2018. Lanez took on a mentor role in her career. In February 2019, she was signed to Lanez's label One Umbrella and RCA Records. She released her debut on the labels, the ten-track album Master, on August 23, 2019, executive produced by Lanez. The debut single, "Beetlejuice," made NPR's Heat Check weekly roundup in August 2019, and the video for the track "Reminders" premiered on Complex on August 21, 2019.

=== 2020–2021: Ry Ry World ===
Her touring schedule in 2020 included bookings at Coachella, Primavera Sound, and Pitchfork Music Festival. On May 22, 2020, Buckles released the single "RIP". This was followed by the Lil Baby-accompanied "Always n Forever" on July 30, 2020. Teasing her sophomore studio album, Buckles released the final two singles leading up to it, "2 You" and "Aura" on June 18, 2021, and July 2, 2021, respectively. On July 16, 2021, her sophomore studio album, Ry Ry World was released, featuring guest appearances from Young Thug amidst the two's dating rumors. She also released the music video for the second song on the album, "Aura".

=== 2022–present: Buckles Laboratories Presents: The Intermission, To Be Eaten Alive and Hearts Sold Separately ===
On March 11, 2022, Buckles released her second EP, Buckles Laboratories Presents: The Intermission. In support of the EP, Buckles embarked on the headlining tour The Experimental Tour that took place from April to July 2022. Her track "Spread Thin" from her sophomore EP was her first to crack the charts, peaking at number 19 on the Billboard Bubbling Under Hot 100 chart. In 2022, she released only three singles: "Stone Cold" with Dess Dior and "Bout Mine" on October 14, 2022, and "Christmas In Toronto" on December 24, 2022, a track dedicated to her boyfriend Young Thug due to his incarceration. All of her singles were released independently under Buckles Laboratory and were distributed by DistroKid.

On February 24, 2023, Buckles appeared on the remix of A Boogie wit da Hoodie's viral hit, "Secrets". Weeks later, on April 14, 2023, she released her first single of 2023, "Rear View" with YoungBoy Never Broke Again as the second single leading up to his sixth full-length studio album, Don't Try This at Home. Her latest single "Ain't Even Friends" with R&B singer Ryan Trey was released on June 30, 2023.

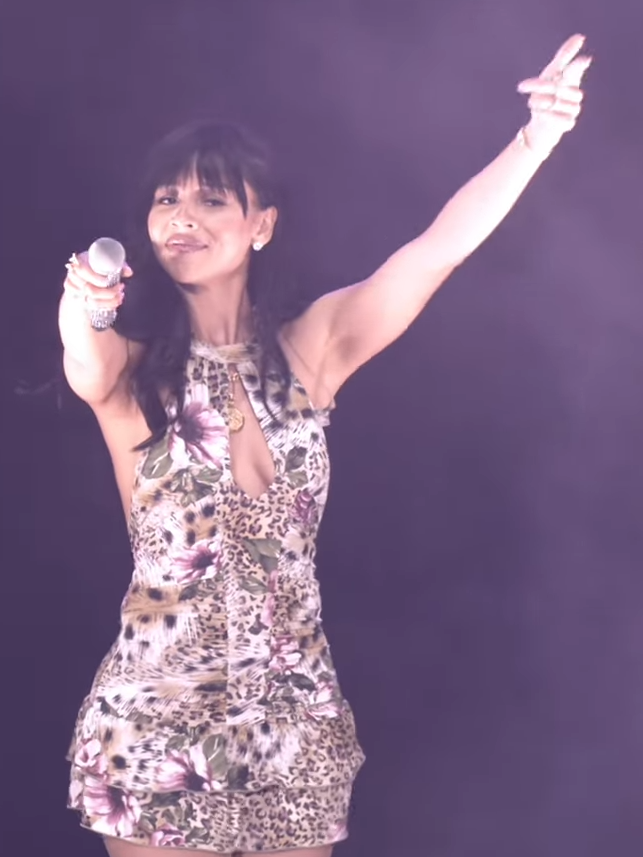
Mariah the Scientist performing at the State Farm Arena in 2025

Alongside the release of Young Thug's "From a Man," Buckles released "From A Woman" as the lead single to her third full-length studio album, To Be Eaten Alive, which was also preceded by Mariah's 2022 song, "Bout Mine". Around the same time, she signed a new joint venture record deal with Epic Records who's behind the release of the aforementioned album. In an interview with Billboard, Mariah spoke on her new record deal:

"I was reluctant to signing any new deal, but I was excited to find a partner that understands me as an artist and has the infrastructure to support me in the ways I need most."

Buckles announced the To Be Eaten Alive Tour in support of the album, with dates across Europe and the United States from February to May 2024. In January 2024, Buckles received her first entry onto the Billboard Hot 100 by featuring on the single "IDGAF" with Tee Grizzley and Chris Brown.

In 2025, Buckles released "Burning Blue", the lead single from her fourth studio album, Hearts Sold Separately. The song debuted at number 25 on the Billboard Hot 100 in May 2025, becoming her first top-40 hit. It also topped Billboard's Rhythmic Airplay and Mainstream R&B/Hip-Hop Airplay charts and was later certified platinum by the RIAA.

Hearts Sold Separately was released on August 22, 2025, through Buckles Laboratories and Epic Records. It debuted at number one on the Top R&B Albums chart and at number 11 on the Billboard 200 with 36,000 equivalent album units, her career-best figures on both charts. During release week, three of its songs charted on the Hot 100, including "Burning Blue", "Is It a Crime" featuring Kali Uchis, and "Sacrifice".

== Artistry ==
Buckles has cited OutKast and Frank Ocean as major songwriting influences. Her lyricism is also heavily impacted by her experience growing up with her father, who was a realist. Her songs are very practical as she views her love experiences from a candid point of view. Her artistry is influenced by Michael Jackson, Prince, and Whitney Houston, as these artists had a clear vision that they executed meticulously.

== Personal life ==
Buckles previously dated Lil Yachty, a relationship that stemmed during her time in college as they had attended the same high school. Their relationship was used as inspiration for songs on RyRy World, such as “Brain” where she references Yachty’s Teenage Tour. On the cover of the album, she wears a “Miles” ring, which is Yachty’s real name. Buckles publicly spoke about the relationship in 2024 on Caresha Please, whilst dating & feeling like a broke college student compared to Lil Yachty's rising music career, she recorded two original songs and gifted them to him on an iPod. Lil Yachty declined to listen to the tracks, explaining he didn't want to "joan" (critique or make fun of) her music.

In 2021, rumors of a romantic relationship between Buckles and Young Thug began to circulate; it was confirmed after the incarceration of Thug, after which Buckles was seen attending court hearings, pleading "Free Thugger" at her shows. Buckles and Thug briefly ended their relationship in October 2025, then got engaged two months later during a concert in Atlanta.

== Legal issues ==
On May 2, 2024, Buckles was arrested with battery and simple battery after she allegedly attacked a woman in a nightclub in Atlanta, Georgia on March 28, 2024. Buckles was released on a $5,000 bond.

== Discography ==
- Master (2019)
- Ry Ry World (2021)
- To Be Eaten Alive (2023)
- Hearts Sold Separately (2025)

== Awards and nominations ==
Award ceremony	Year	Category	Nominee(s) / work(s)	Results	Ref.
American Music Awards	2026	Breakthrough R&B Artist	Herself	Nominated	
American Music Awards	2026	Best R&B Song	"Burning Blue"	Nominated	
American Music Awards	2026	Best R&B Album	Hearts Sold Separately	Nominated	
BET Awards	2026	Herself	Album of the Year	Nominated	
BET Awards	2026	"Burning Blue"	Video of the Year	Nominated	
BET Awards	2026	"Burning Blue"	Viewer's Choice Award	Won	
BET Awards	2026	"Is It a Crime" (with Kali Uchis)	Viewer's Choice Award	Nominated	
BET Awards	2026	"Is It a Crime" (with Kali Uchis)	Best Collaboration	Nominated	
BET Awards	2026	Hearts Sold Separately	Album of the Year	Nominated	
Billboard Women in Music	2026	Herself	Rising Star Award	Won	
Soul Train Music Awards	2026	"Is It a Crime" (with Kali Uchis)	R&B/Soul Song of The Year	Pending	
