= Burning Blue (song) =

Single by Mariah the Scientist

from the album Hearts Sold Separately
- Released: May 2, 2025
- Genre: R&B
- Length: 3:25
- Label: Buckles Laboratories; Epic
- Songwriter: Mariah Buckles
- Producers: Jetski Purp; Nineteen85

Mariah the Scientist singles chronology
"Slow Down" (2024)	"Burning Blue" (2025)	"Is It a Crime" (2025)

Music video
- "Burning Blue" on YouTube

"Burning Blue" is a song recorded by American singer-songwriter Mariah the Scientist, released by Buckles Laboratories and Epic on May 2, 2025. It was released as the lead single from her fourth studio album, Hearts Sold Separately.

The song debuted and peaked at number 25 on the Billboard Hot 100, marking Mariah's first top 40 single on the chart. It also charted within the top 40 in Suriname and South Africa.

== Composition and lyrics ==
"Burning Blue" is a retro-inspired R&B ballad that features Mariah's lyrical explanation of her deep emotions towards her lover. In a conversation with Complex, she clarified that "Burning Blue" reflects personal vulnerability more than literal heartbreak.

Bryson "Boom" Paul of HotNewHipHop observed that on "Burning Blue", Mariah "crafts a vivid portrait of emotional tension through elemental imagery," positioning herself as "cold as ice" and her lover as "fire". Paul highlighted Mariah's vocal performance on the song, adding that her voice "floats through the track with quiet restraint". Elaina Bernstein of Hypebeast opined that "her effortless vocal range [lures] listeners in almost instantly" and described the song as "soulful".

== Music video ==
The music video for "Burning Blue" was directed by Claire Bishara and premiered on May 10, 2025, via Mariah's official YouTube and Vevo channels. Styled around a militaristic motif, the video opens with Mariah dressed in an olive‑green officer's jacket, positioned atop a minimalist set designed to resemble a command post. She is joined by a troupe of dancers clad in matching fatigues, performing synchronized choreography that blends martial precision with sensual movement. Interspersed throughout are intimate close‑ups of Mariah, emphasizing the song's themes of emotional vulnerability and intensity.

== Credits and personnel ==
Song credits and personnel adapted from music streaming service Tidal.

- Mariah the Scientist – songwriting, vocals
- Jetski Purp – producer
- Nineteen85 – producer
- Chris Gehringer – mastering engineer
- Rob Bisel – mixing engineer
- Natalie D'Orlando – recording engineer
- Tanner Ott – recording engineer
- Kim Davis – background vocals
- Camille Harrison – background vocals

== Charts ==
=== Weekly charts ===
Weekly chart performance for "Burning Blue"
Chart (2025–2026)	Peak position
Global 200 (Billboard)	83
Jamaica Airplay (JAMMS)	9
New Zealand Hot Singles (RMNZ)	4
Nigeria (TurnTable Top 100)	94
South Africa Streaming (TOSAC)	39
Suriname (Nationale Top 40)	14
US Billboard Hot 100	25
US Hot R&B/Hip-Hop Songs (Billboard)	3
US Pop Airplay (Billboard)	33
US R&B/Hip-Hop Airplay (Billboard)	3
US Rhythmic Airplay (Billboard)	1

=== Year-end charts ===
Year-end chart performance for "Burning Blue"
Chart (2025)	Position
US Billboard Hot 100	58
US Hot R&B/Hip-Hop Songs (Billboard)	14
US R&B/Hip-Hop Airplay (Billboard)	9
US Rhythmic Airplay (Billboard)	21

== Certifications ==
Certifications for "Burning Blue"
Region	Certification	Certified units/sales
New Zealand (RMNZ)	Gold	15,000^{‡}
United States (RIAA)	2× Platinum	2,000,000^{‡}
^{‡} Sales+streaming figures based on certification alone.

== Release history ==
Release dates and formats for "Burning Blue"
Region	Date	Format(s)	Label	Ref.
Various	May 2, 2025	Digital download; streaming	Buckles Laboratories; Epic	
United States	May 6, 2025	Rhythmic contemporary radio	Epic	
United States	July 15, 2025	Contemporary hit radio	Epic	
