= BET Awards 2002 =

American entertainment awards ceremony

2nd BET Awards
- Date: June 25, 2002
- Location: Kodak Theatre, Los Angeles, California
- Presented by: Black Entertainment Television
- Hosted by: Steve Harvey; Cedric the Entertainer

Television/radio coverage
- Network: BET

The 2nd BET Awards took place at the Kodak Theatre in Los Angeles, California on June 25, 2002. The awards recognized Americans in music, acting, sports, and other fields of entertainment over the past year. Comedian Steve Harvey and Cedric the Entertainer hosted the event for the second time.

== Performances ==
- Yolanda Adams – "I'm Gonna Be Ready" and "Since the Last Time I Saw You" (Medley)
- Usher – "U Don't Have to Call"
- Nelly – "Hot in Herre"
- Mary J. Blige and Ja Rule – "Rainy Dayz"
- Ludacris – "Saturday (Oooh! Ooooh!)" and "Move Bitch" (Medley)
- Ja Rule and Charli Baltimore – "Down Ass Bitch"
- Chaka Khan – "Fantasy"
- Lil' Bow Wow – "Take Ya Home"
- B2K – "Uh Huh"
- Ashanti – "Foolish"/"Happy"

== Winners and nominees ==
| Video of the Year | Viewers' Choice |
|---|---|
| Busta Rhymes feat. P. Diddy and Pharrell – "Pass the Courvoisier, Part II"; Aaliyah – "Rock the Boat"; Missy Elliott feat. Ludacris and Trina – "One Minute Man"; P. Diddy feat. Black Rob and Mark Curry – "Bad Boy for Life"; Usher – "U Got It Bad" | B2K – "Uh Huh"; Aaliyah – "Rock the Boat"; Ja Rule feat. Ashanti – "Always on Time"; Lil' Bow Wow – "Take Ya Home"; Alicia Keys – "Fallin'" |
| Best Female Hip Hop Artist | Best Male Hip Hop Artist |
| Missy Elliott; Foxy Brown; Angie Martinez; Mystic; Trina | Ja Rule; Busta Rhymes; Jay-Z; Ludacris; Nas |
| Best Female R&B Artist | Best Male R&B Artist |
| India.Arie; Aaliyah; Mary J. Blige; Faith Evans; Alicia Keys | Usher; Craig David; Jaheim; Maxwell; Musiq |
Best Group
Outkast; 112; B2K; Destiny's Child; Jagged Edge
| Best New Artist | Best Gospel Artist |
| Alicia Keys; Ashanti; B2K; Craig David; Tweet | Yolanda Adams; Kurt Carr; Kirk Franklin; Fred Hammond; CeCe Winans |
| Best Actress | Best Actor |
| Halle Berry – Monster's Ball and Swordfish; Aaliyah – The Queen of the Damned; Angela Bassett – The Score; Vivica A. Fox – Kingdom Come and Two Can Play That Game; Jada Pinkett Smith – Ali and Kingdom Come | Will Smith – Ali; Morgan Freeman – Along Came a Spider; Eddie Murphy – Dr. Dolittle 2, Showtime and Shrek; Chris Tucker – Rush Hour 2; Denzel Washington – Training Day and John Q. |
| Sportswoman of the Year | Sportsman of the Year |
| Laila Ali; Vonetta Flowers; Lisa Leslie; Serena Williams; Venus Williams | Kobe Bryant; Allen Iverson; Derek Jeter; Michael Jordan; Tiger Woods |
| Lifetime Achievement Award | Humanitarian Award |
| Earth, Wind & Fire | Muhammad Ali |
