= BET Awards 2001 =

Award ceremony in Las Vegas, Nevada

1st BET Awards
- Date: June 19, 2001
- Location: Paris Hotel, Las Vegas, Nevada
- Presented by: Black Entertainment Television
- Hosted by: Steve Harvey; Cedric the Entertainer

Television/radio coverage
- Network: BET
- Directed by: Glenn Weiss

The 1st BET Awards took place at the Paris Hotel in Las Vegas, Nevada on June 19, 2001. The awards recognized Americans in Music, Acting, Sports, and other fields of entertainment over the past year. Comedian Steve Harvey and Cedric the Entertainer hosted the event for the first time.

== Performances ==
- Destiny's Child – "Bootylicious"
- Snoop Dogg, Nate Dogg and Master P – "Lay Low"
- Usher – "U Remind Me"
- Patti LaBelle and Donnie McClurkin – "Stand!"
- Lil' Bow Wow and Snoop Dogg – "Bow Wow (That's My Name)"
- Jay Z – "Fiesta" (with R. Kelly), "I Just Wanna Love U (Give It 2 Me)" and "Izzo (H.O.V.A.)"
- Eve and Gwen Stefani – "Let Me Blow Ya Mind"
- Whitney Houston Lifetime Achievement Award Tribute:
  - Christina Aguilera – "Run to You"
  - Luther Vandross — "All the Woman That I Need"
- Whitney Houston — "I Have Nothing" and "I Will Always Love You" (Lifetime Achievement Award performance)
- Sisqo – "Can I Live?"
- Outkast – "Ms. Jackson" and "So Fresh, So Clean"

== Winners and nominees ==
Video of the Year	Viewers' Choice
Outkast – "Ms. Jackson"; Destiny's Child – "Independent Women Part I"; Dr. Dre featuring Kurupt, Nate Dogg & Snoop Dogg – "The Next Episode"; Eminem feat. Dido – "Stan"; Janet Jackson – "All for You"	Bow Wow – "Bow Wow (That's My Name)"; Destiny's Child – "Independent Women Part 1"; R. Kelly – "I Wish"; Jay Z – "I Just Wanna Love U (Give It 2 Me)"
Best Female Hip Hop Artist	Best Male Hip Hop Artist
Eve; Da Brat; Lil' Kim; Missy Elliott; Trina	Jay Z; Ja Rule; Mystikal; Nelly; Snoop Dogg
Best Female R&B Artist	Best Male R&B Artist
Mary J. Blige; Aaliyah; Jill Scott; Janet Jackson; Erykah Badu	Musiq; R. Kelly; Carl Thomas; Joe; Maxwell
Best Female Group	Best Male Group
Destiny's Child; Mary Mary; 3LW; 702; Blaque	OutKast; Jagged Edge; Dr. Dre, Kurupt, Nate Dogg & Snoop Dogg; Boyz II Men; 112
Best New Artist	Best Gospel Artist
Nelly; Lil' Bow Wow; Musiq; Jill Scott; India.Arie	Donnie McClurkin; Mary Mary; Yolanda Adams; Hezekiah Walker; Kirk Franklin
Best Actress	Best Actor
Sanaa Lathan; Aaliyah; Regina King; Angela Bassett	Denzel Washington; Omar Epps; Samuel L. Jackson; Cuba Gooding Jr.
Sportswoman of the Year	Sportsman of the Year
Marion Jones; Venus Williams; Serena Williams; Sheryl Swoopes	Allen Iverson; Tiger Woods; Kobe Bryant; Shaquille O'Neal
Lifetime Achievement
Whitney Houston
