= Kennard Ramsey =

American composer, guitarist and recording artist

- Occupations: Composer; guitarist; recording artist
- Years active: 1980s–present

Kennard Ramsey is an American composer, guitarist and recording artist. He has composed music for film and television, including Ringmaster, Freeway II: Confessions of a Trickbaby, Hair Show, Lincoln Heights and Kevin Hart: Let Me Explain. As a recording artist, he released the album Somos through Stanley Clarke's Roxboro Entertainment Group.

== Career ==
Ramsey studied composition and arranging with composer and arranger Spud Murphy for five years.

Ramsey's work as a film composer includes Ringmaster (1998), directed by Neil Abramson. He also composed music for Freeway II: Confessions of a Trickbaby (1999) and Bundy (2002).

In 2004, Ramsey composed the music for Hair Show, directed by Leslie Small.

Ramsey has also worked in television. He contributed additional music to the animated series Waynehead, for which Stanley Clarke composed the theme and music. His television work also includes the drama series Lincoln Heights, on which he composed music with Clarke.

In December 2009, Kennard Ramsey was a guest instructor, teaching film music composition at the ION International Film Festival in Port Harcourt, Nigeria.

In 2011, Ramsey released the jazz album Somos through Roxboro Entertainment Group, a record label founded by Clarke. Somos was one of the label's first releases. Ramsey described the album as an updated approach to the sounds associated with Verve Records and Blue Note Records.

Ramsey produced and arranged Somos and played acoustic and electric guitar, keyboards and synthesizer. He was also credited as composer, lyricist and orchestrator.

In 2013, Ramsey composed the original score for the concert film Kevin Hart: Let Me Explain, starring Kevin Hart and directed by Tim Story. He also worked on The Heavenly Kid, Lincoln Heights and Knots Landing.

=== Theatre ===
Ramsey was the composer and musical director for Jambalaya, the Musical, created by Nancy Gregory. The production opened at the Orpheum Theater in New Orleans in November 2016.

== Selected filmography ==
=== Film ===
Year	Title	Credit
1985	The Heavenly Kid	Music
1994	Fortunes of War	Composer
1995	Without Air	Composer
1997	B.A.P.S.	Orchestra
1998	Ringmaster	Composer
1999	Freeway II: Confessions of a Trickbaby	Composer
1999	Double Jeopardy	Additional music
2000	Romeo Must Die	Additional music, orchestrator
2002	Bundy	Composer
2004	Hair Show	Composer
2008	First Sunday	Orchestrator
2013	Kevin Hart: Let Me Explain	Composer
2014	Category 5	Composer
2020	The App That Stole Christmas	Composer

=== Television ===
Title	Credit
Knots Landing	Music
Goof Troop	Music
Bonkers	Music
Waynehead	Additional music
Static Shock	Music
The X-Files	Music
Lincoln Heights	Composer

== Discography ==
=== Albums ===
- Somos (2011)
