= Kevin Hart: What Now? =

- Theatrical release poster
- Directed by: Leslie Small; Tim Story
- Written by: Kevin Hart; Harry Ratchford; Joey Wells
- Produced by: Jeff Clanagan; Kevin Hart; Blake Morrison; Valerie Bleth Sharp
- Starring: Kevin Hart
- Cinematography: Cameron Barnett; Christopher Duskin
- Edited by: Peter S. Elliot; Guy Harding
- Music by: Christopher Lennertz
- Production company: HartBeat Productions
- Distributed by: Universal Pictures
- Release date: October 14, 2016
- Running time: 96 minutes
- Country: United States
- Language: English
- Budget: $9.9 million
- Box office: $23.6 million

Kevin Hart: What Now? is a 2016 American stand-up comedy film starring comedian Kevin Hart, based on his 2015 stand-up tour of the same name. It is the third theatrical release of a Hart stand-up show, following Kevin Hart: Laugh at My Pain (2011) and Kevin Hart: Let Me Explain (2013). The film was released in the United States on October 14, 2016. It received generally positive reviews and grossed $23 million.

== Plot ==
In the film's spy sub-plot, set before the events of the performance, Kevin is secret agent for MI6 (Agent 0054) and attends a poker game event with his date Money Berry (Halle Berry), only for it to go horribly wrong.

In the performance portion, which takes up most of the film, Hart performs at Lincoln Financial Field in Philadelphia, providing a humorous insight into parenting, people on the edge, and hardships in everyday life.

== Cast ==
- Kevin Hart as Agent 0054 (himself)
- Halle Berry as Money Berry
- Don Cheadle as FBI Agent
- David Meunier as Victor the Russian criminal mastermind
- Ed Helms as a Bartender
- Peter Mensah as an African Dictator
- Joey Wells as a Ladies' man

== Release ==
On May 6, 2015, Universal Pictures announced that Kevin Hart: What Now?, a stand-up comedy film featuring a performance of Kevin Hart's What Now? Tour, would be theatrically released in the United States on October 14, 2016. The show was filmed live on August 30, 2015, in front of 53,000 people, at Philadelphia's Lincoln Financial Field, with a live dress rehearsal for a small, intimate audience filmed at the stadium the night before on August 29, 2015.

The film's teaser trailer was released January 12, 2016, and was shown in front of screenings of Universal's Ride Along 2.

DVD and Blu-ray release for What Now? came out January 10, 2017

== Soundtrack ==
As Chocolate Droppa, his alias, he signed to Motown Records and released Kevin Hart: What Now? (The Mixtape Presents Chocolate Droppa), the soundtrack to the stand-up film. He released the singles "Push It On Me" featuring Trey Songz and "Baller Alert" with Migos & T.I.

== Comedy album ==
A comedy album was also released for Kevin Hart: What Now?, and was nominated for Best Comedy Album at the 2018 Grammy Awards.

== Reception ==
=== Box office ===
The film was expected to gross $13–15 million from 2,567 theaters in its opening weekend. It ended up opening to $11.8 million, finishing second at the box office, and beating out Let Me Explain ($10 million) as the highest opening among Hart's stand-up comedy concert films. The film went on to gross a total of $23.6 million, the second highest of Hart's stand-up films, behind Let Me Explain ($32.3 million).

=== Critical response ===
On Rotten Tomatoes, the film has an approval rating of 75% based on 57 reviews, with an average rating of 6.13/10. The site's critical consensus reads, "Kevin Hart: What Now? packs in enough of the comedian's infectious energy to more than compensate for the lulls in a stand-up set that doesn't quite rank with his best." On Metacritic, the film has a score 60 out of 100, based on 22 critics, indicating "mixed or average" reviews. Audiences polled by CinemaScore gave the film an average grade of "A−" on an A+ to F scale.
