= One of Us Tripped =

- VHS cover
- Directed by: Tim Story
- Produced by: Angela Northington
- Starring: Kimani Callender; Kevin Mambo
- Edited by: Tim Story
- Music by: Eric Reed
- Distributed by: Xenon Pictures
- Release date: 1997
- Running time: 75 minutes
- Country: United States
- Language: English

One of Us Tripped is a 1997 American drama film directed by Tim Story (in his directorial debut). It stars Kimani Callender and Kevin Mambo.

== Plot ==
The trail of a client's unfaithful lover takes two young detectives down a road of danger and murder.

== Cast ==
- Kimani Callender as Felix
- Kevin Mambo as Thomas
- Regina Williams
- Damon Wilson as Miles
- Nakia Burrise as Keisha

== See also ==
- List of crime films
