= BET Award for Best Movie =

American entertainment award category

BET Awards for Best Movie
- Country: United States
- Presented by: BET Awards
- First award: 2010
- Currently held by: Luther: Never Too Much (2025)

The BET Award for Best Movie is given to the overall best film released in the same or previous year. The award was first given in 2010.

== Winners and nominees ==
Winners are listed first and highlighted in bold.

=== 2010s ===
Year	Film	Ref
2010
2010	**Precious**	
2010	Avatar	
2010	The Blind Side	
2010	Law Abiding Citizen	
2010	Michael Jackson's This Is It	
2011
2011	**For Colored Girls**	
2011	Death at a Funeral	
2011	Takers	
2011	Why Did I Get Married Too?	
2012
2012	**The Help**	
2012	Good Deeds	
2012	Jumping the Broom	
2012	Laugh at My Pain	
2012	Red Tails	
2013
2013	**Think Like a Man**	
2013	Beasts of the Southern Wild	
2013	Django Unchained	
2013	Something from Nothing: The Art of Rap	
2013	Sparkle	
2014
2014	**12 Years a Slave**	
2014	The Butler	
2014	The Best Man Holiday	
2014	Fruitvale Station	
2014	Kevin Hart: Let Me Explain	
2015
2015	**Selma**	
2015	Annie	
2015	Beyond the Lights	
2015	Think Like a Man Too	
2015	Top Five	
2016
2016	**Straight Outta Compton**	
2016	Beasts of No Nation	
2016	Concussion	
2016	Creed	
2016	Dope	
2017
2017	**Hidden Figures**	
2017	The Birth of a Nation	
2017	Fences	
2017	Get Out	
2017	Moonlight	
2018
2018	**Black Panther**	
2018	A Wrinkle in Time	
2018	Girls Trip	
2018	Mudbound	
2018	Detroit	
2019
2019	**BlacKkKlansman**	
2019	Creed II	
2019	If Beale Street Could Talk	
2019	Spider-Man: Into the Spider-Verse	
2019	The Hate U Give	

=== 2020s ===
Year	Film	Ref
2020
2020	**Queen & Slim**	
2020	Bad Boys for Life	
2020	Dolemite Is My Name	
2020	Harriet	
2020	Homecoming: A Film by Beyoncé	
2020	Just Mercy	
2021
2021	**Judas and the Black Messiah**	
2021	Coming 2 America	
2021	Ma Rainey's Black Bottom	
2021	One Night in Miami...	
2021	Soul	
2021	The United States vs. Billie Holiday	
2022
2022	**King Richard**	
2022	Candyman	
2022	Respect	
2022	Space Jam: A New Legacy	
2022	Summer of Soul	
2022	The Harder They Fall	
2023
2023	**Black Panther: Wakanda Forever**	
2023	Creed 3	
2023	Emancipation	
2023	Nope	
2023	The Woman King	
2023	Till	
2023	Whitney Houston: I Wanna Dance with Somebody	
2024
2024	**Bob Marley: One Love**	
2024	American Fiction	
2024	Renaissance	
2024	Spider-Man: Across the Spider-Verse	
2024	The Book of Clarence	
2024	The Color Purple	
2024	The Equalizer 3	
2024	The Little Mermaid	
2025
2025	**Luther: Never Too Much**	
2025	Bad Boys: Ride or Die	
2025	Beverly Hills Cop: Axel F	
2025	One of Them Days	
2025	Rebel Ridge	
2025	The Piano Lesson	
2025	The Six Triple Eight	

== See also ==
- BET Award for Best Actor
- BET Award for Best Actress
