= D.C. Young Fly =

American comedian and actor (born 1992)

- Born: John Richard Whitfield; May 2, 1992 (age 34); Atlanta, Georgia, U.S.
- Education: Georgia Southern University–Armstrong Campus
- Partner: Jacky Oh (2015–2023; deceased)

Comedy career
- Years active: 2011–present
- Medium: Stand-up; film; television; music
- Genres: Observational comedy; black comedy; surreal humor; insult comedy; racial humor; sarcasm; satire
- Subjects: African-American culture; everyday life; human sexuality; marriage; parenting; pop culture; race relations; racism; self-deprecation

YouTube information
- Channel: Dc Young Fly
- Years active: 2014–present
- Genres: Comedy; stand-up; sketch; roast
- Subscribers: 1.04 million
- Views: 57 million
- Last updated: September 22, 2024
- Website: dcyoungflyofficial.com

John Richard Whitfield (born May 2, 1992), known professionally as D.C. Young Fly, is an American comedian, host, singer, and actor. Commencing his acting career in 2014, he garnered prominence as a recurring cast member on the improv comedy series Wild 'n Out (2015-present). He appeared on DigitalLivesMatter (2016). Whitfield assumed the starring role of Spooky in Outlaw Posse.

== Early life ==
John Whitfield was born and raised in Atlanta, Georgia, specifically within the city's West Side locale. His mother was an educator at the middle school level. He pursued his secondary education at Benjamin E. Mays High School.

== Career ==
=== 2012–2017 ===
Whitfield commenced his career in the entertainment industry as a comedian and thespian. In 2012, Whitfield hosted Gotham Comedy Live in New York City, with Jay Nog, Atheer Yacoub, and Fransisco Ramos in a special edition of the show. In 2015, Whitfield became a recurring cast member on the MTV improv comedy series Wild 'n Out, hosted by comedian Nick Cannon. Although this season debuted with a double bill on June 10, 2015, featuring Kevin Hart and Rae Sremmurd, it concluded its initial run with Shaquille O'Neal and Migos on August 19, 2015.

In 2015, D.C, along with his Wild n’ Out co-stars, Karlous Miller and Chico Bean, started their own podcast, called The 85 South Show, where they speak on various topics, interact with the audience, and freestyle on songs. Whitfield made an appearance as Latavious in an episode of the television series Scream. In August 2016, he secured a leading role in Terri J. Vaughn's #DigitalLivesMatter. That same year, he transitioned to the silver screen, making his cinematic debut as Eric in the film Almost Christmas. This project afforded him the opportunity to share the screen with actors Kimberly Elise, Danny Glover, Omar Epps, and Gabrielle Union. Whitfield made an appearance in My Cousin's Ghetto Wedding.

In 2017, Whitfield appeared in several notable projects. He starred in the critically acclaimed miniseries The New Edition Story in January, which received generally positive reviews. He subsequently appeared in BET's The Quad in February, playing the role of Young Rapper. Whitfield made a guest appearance in Dirty South House Arrest the same month. In March, Whitfield served as an opening act for Chris Brown's Party Tour. Whitfield made appearances on the American television series Hip Hop Squares and Tales, portraying Lil Joe in the latter's June episode. From 2017 to 2019, Whitfield became a main host for the revived TRL on MTV.

=== 2018–present ===
In 2018, Whitfield appeared in the American teen comedy-drama TV series Grown-ish, a spin-off of the ABC series Black-ish. He played the role of Rafael in two episodes. It was announced he would star alongside Lil Yachty in How High 2, premiering on MTV on April 20, 2019. Whitfield filmed two movies: She Ball with Nick Cannon and I Got the Hook Up 2 with Master P, released on July 12, 2019.

In 2019, he co-hosted the 2019 BET Social Awards with Jess Hilarious. Whitfield joined Eric Bellinger's Cuffing Season Tour as an opening act in December. In 2020, Whitfield became a judge on the internet game show Floored. Whitfield hosted the 2020 BET Hip-Hop Awards alongside Chico Bean and Karlous Miller in October.

In 2021, Whitfield appeared in films For the Love of Money, Envy: Seven Deadly Sins, Miracles Across 125th Street, and in the Starz TV show BMF. In 2022, Whitfield starred in the 2023 remake of House Party, released on January 13, 2023. In 2023, Whitfield was announced as the host of Celebrity Squares, a revival of Hollywood Squares on VH1 (later moved to BET).

Whitfield portrayed the character Rooster in the cinematic production Bosco, which debuted on 2 February 2024. Whitfield assumed the role of Spooky in the Quiver Distribution film Outlaw Posse, released on 1 March 2024.

== Personal life ==
Whitfield was in a relationship with Jacklyn Smith (known professionally as Ms. Jacky Oh), a former Wild 'n Out girl, with whom he had three children. Smith died on May 31, 2023 from complications following a surgery.

== Filmography ==
=== Film ===
| Year | Title | Role | Notes |
|---|---|---|---|
| 2016 | DigitalLivesMatter | Himself | |
| 2016 | Hollywood Hearts | Wonder | TV movie |
| 2016 | Almost Christmas | Eric | |
| 2017 | Dirty South House Arrest | Fly | |
| 2018 | Armed | G Money | |
| 2019 | The Trap | Goo | |
| 2019 | How High 2 | Calvin | TV movie |
| 2019 | I Got the Hook Up 2 | Spyda | |
| 2019 | Trae Tha Movie | – | |
| 2020 | 2 Minutes of Fame | Jethro | |
| 2020 | She Ball | Down South | |
| 2021 | Envy: A Seven Deadly Sins Story | – | TV movie |
| 2021 | For the Love of Money | Bobby | |
| 2021 | Miracles Across 125th Street | Money Gone Maxwell | TV movie |
| 2023 | House Party | Vic | |
| 2023 | Pretty Stoned | Himself | TV movie |
| 2023 | Da 'Partments | Astez | |
| 2023 | Candy Cane Lane | Josh | |
| 2024 | Bosco | Rooster | |
| 2024 | Outlaw Posse | Spooky | |

=== Television ===
| Year | Title | Role | Notes |
|---|---|---|---|
| 2015– | Wild 'n Out | Himself | Main Cast: Season 7- |
| 2016 | Wild 'n On Tour | Himself | Main Cast |
| 2016 | Family Feud | Himself/Contestant | Episode: "Episode #18.51" |
| 2017 | Gotham Comedy Live | Himself/Host | Episode: "DC Young Fly" |
| 2017 | The New Edition Story | Barber | Episode: "Part 3" |
| 2017 | The Quad | Young Rapper | Episode: "Pilot" |
| 2017 | Mann & Wife | King Dookie | Episode: "Dead Mann Walking" |
| 2017 | Tales | Lil Joe | Episode: "A Story to Tell" |
| 2017 | In the Cut | Thug Leader | Episode: "The Hustle" |
| 2017 | Dead House | Dead Ass | Main Cast |
| 2017–19 | Hip Hop Squares | Himself/Panelist | Recurring Panelist: Season 3–6 |
| 2018 | Black Card Revoked | Himself | Episode: "DC Young Fly, Billy Sorrells, Jess Hilarious" |
| 2018 | Rel | Jaymo | Recurring Cast |
| 2019 | Love & Hip Hop: Atlanta | Himself/Host | Episode: "Love & Hip Hop Awards: Most Certified" |
| 2019 | The Family Business | Mack | Episode: "Mexican Stand Off" |
| 2019 | Scream | Latavious | Episode: "Devil's Night" |
| 2019 | Grown-ish | Rafael | Recurring Cast: Season 2 |
| 2019 | The Grid | Slim | Episode: "All Night" |
| 2020 | Floored | Himself/Guest Judge | Episode: "Hip Hop Ball Drop" |
| 2020 | American Soul | Sly Stone | Episode: "Lovely Day" |
| 2020–21 | BET Hip Hop Awards | Himself/Co-Host | Main Co-Host |
| 2021–23 | BMF | Saint | Guest Cast: Season 1–2 |
| 2022 | The Real | Himself/Guest Co-Host | Episode: "Men of Comedy Week – Day 4" |
| 2022 | Phat Tuesdays: The Era Of Hip Hop Comedy | Himself | Main Guest |
| 2022 | The Proud Family: Louder and Prouder | Man-Man (voice) | Episode: "Old Towne Road: Part 1" |
| 2023 | See It Loud: The History of Black Television | Himself | Episode: "Laughing Out Loud" |
| 2023 | Celebrity Squares | Himself/Host | Main Host |
