= The Firing Squad (1999 film) =

- Directed by: Tim Story
- Written by: Brian Buccellato; Tim Story
- Produced by: Angela Northington; Vicky Story; Vicky Mara Story
- Starring: Kevin Mambo
- Edited by: Christopher Stack; Tim Story
- Music by: Eric Reed
- Distributed by: Xenon Pictures
- Release date: 1999
- Running time: 95 minutes
- Country: United States
- Language: English

The Firing Squad is a 1999 American crime drama film directed by Tim Story and starring Kevin Mambo. It was Tim Story's second film as director.

== Plot ==
A woman enlists the help of two friends in avenging the abuse her girlfriend has suffered at the hands of an ill-tempered husband.

== Cast ==
- Kevin Mambo as Kane
- Megahn Perry
- Brian Buccellato as Evan
- Damon Wilson as City
- Melanna Gray as Beauty
- Regina Williams

== Production ==
Tim's wife Vicki Mara Story told Variety that "she and Tim borrowed several hundred thousand dollars, including a $40,000 line of credit from her father."
