= Hart to Heart =

- Genre: Talk show
- Presented by: Kevin Hart
- Country of origin: United States
- Original language: English
- No. of seasons: 4
- No. of episodes: 38

Production
- Executive producers: Kevin Hart; Jeff Clanagan; Candice Wilson Cherry; Thai Randolph; Todd Yasui
- Running time: 44–59 minutes
- Production company: LOL Studios

Original release
- Network: Peacock
- Release: August 5, 2021 – July 25, 2024

Hart to Heart is an American talk show hosted by actor and comedian Kevin Hart. The first season premiered on August 5, 2021, and concluded on August 26, 2021. The second season premiered on July 14, 2022. The series airs new episodes weekly on Peacock. The third season premiered on July 6, 2023. The fourth season premiered on June 20, 2024.

== Episodes ==
Season	Episodes	Originally released	
Season	Episodes	First released	Last released
1	11	August 5, 2021	August 26, 2021
2	11	July 14, 2022	August 11, 2022
3	10	July 6, 2023	August 3, 2023
4	6	June 20, 2024	July 25, 2024

=== Season 1 (2021) ===
No. overall	No. in season	Guest	Directed by	Original release date	Prod. code
1	1	Miley Cyrus	Leslie Small	August 5, 2021	101
2	2	Don Cheadle	Leslie Small	August 5, 2021	102
3	3	Kelly Clarkson	Leslie Small	August 5, 2021	103
4	4	Cameron Diaz	Leslie Small	August 12, 2021	104
5	5	Taraji P. Henson	Leslie Small	August 12, 2021	105
6	6	Jimmy Kimmel	Leslie Small	August 12, 2021	106
7	7	Nick Cannon	Leslie Small	August 19, 2021	107
8	8	Bryan Cranston	Leslie Small	August 19, 2021	108
9	9	John Travolta	Leslie Small	August 19, 2021	109
10	10	Ice Cube	Leslie Small	August 26, 2021	110
11	11	Jay Leno	Leslie Small	August 26, 2021	111

=== Season 2 (2022) ===
No. overall	No. in season	Guest	Directed by	Original release date	Prod. code
12	1	Pete Davidson	Leslie Small	July 14, 2022	201
13	2	Jay-Z	Leslie Small	July 14, 2022	202
14	3	Chris Rock	Leslie Small	July 21, 2022	204
15	4	Mark Wahlberg	Leslie Small	July 21, 2022	203
16	5	Tracee Ellis Ross	Leslie Small	July 28, 2022	205
17	6	Mike Tyson	Leslie Small	July 28, 2022	206
18	7	Saweetie	Leslie Small	August 4, 2022	207
19	8	Tyler Perry	Leslie Small	August 4, 2022	208
20	9	Kristen Stewart	Leslie Small	August 11, 2022	209
21	10	Simu Liu	Leslie Small	August 11, 2022	210
22	11	Seth MacFarlane	Leslie Small	August 11, 2022	211

=== Season 3 (2023) ===
No. overall	No. in season	Guest	Directed by	Original release date	Prod. code
23	1	Sofia Vergara	Leslie Small	July 6, 2023	301
24	2	John Cena	Leslie Small	July 6, 2023	302
25	3	Dr. Dre	Leslie Small	July 13, 2023	303
26	4	Will Ferrell	Leslie Small	July 13, 2023	304
27	5	Issa Rae	Leslie Small	July 20, 2023	305
28	6	Mark Cuban	Leslie Small	July 20, 2023	306
29	7	Bill Maher	Leslie Small	July 27, 2023	307
30	8	J. Cole	Leslie Small	July 27, 2023	308
31	9	Dwayne Johnson	Leslie Small	August 3, 2023	309
32	10	Will Smith	Leslie Small	August 3, 2023	310

=== Season 4 (2024) ===
No. overall	No. in season	Guest	Directed by	Original release date	Prod. code
33	1	Ben Affleck	Leslie Small	June 20, 2024	401
34	2	George Lopez	Leslie Small	June 27, 2024	402
35	3	Cynthia Erivo	Leslie Small	July 4, 2024	403
36	4	Andy Samberg	Leslie Small	July 11, 2024	404
37	5	Judd Apatow	Leslie Small	July 18, 2024	405
38	6	Niecy Nash-Betts	Leslie Small	July 25, 2024	406

== Production ==
The series was announced in July 2021, confirming that guests would range from "musicians to a-list actors". The series is produced by LOL Studios. Kevin Hart, Jeff Clanagan, Candice Wilson Cherry, Thai Randolph, and Todd Yasui serve as executive producers, and Leslie Small directs all episodes. DLynn Proctor appears as the show's sommelier. A second season was announced on July 8, 2022.

=== Cast ===
Kevin Hart hosts the series.

During the first season, guests for upcoming episodes were announced in the days prior to episode releases. On August 17, 2021 it was confirmed that Nick Cannon, Bryan Cranston & John Travolta would appear in future episodes. When the second season was announced, guests were revealed to include Jay-Z, Mark Wahlberg, Saweetie, Mike Tyson, Tracee Ellis Ross, Chris Rock, Tyler Perry, Pete Davidson, Simu Liu, Seth MacFarlane and Kristen Stewart.
