= Amazing Stories (disambiguation) =

Amazing Stories is an American science fiction magazine launched in 1926. It can also refer to:

- Amazing Stories (1985 TV series), a TV series created by Steven Spielberg
- Amazing Stories (2020 TV series), a revival of the 1980s TV series
