= Dashing Through the Snow =

2023 film by Tim Story

- Release poster
- Directed by: Tim Story
- Written by: Scott Rosenberg
- Produced by: John Jacobs; Will Packer
- Starring: Lil Rel Howery; Chris "Ludacris" Bridges; Teyonah Parris; Oscar Nunez; Madison Skye Validum; Mary Lynn Rajskub
- Cinematography: Chris Duskin
- Edited by: David Clark; David Rennie
- Music by: Christopher Lennertz
- Production companies: Walt Disney Pictures; Will Packer Productions; Smart Entertainment
- Distributed by: Disney+
- Release date: November 17, 2023
- Running time: 90 minutes
- Country: United States
- Language: English

Dashing Through the Snow is a 2023 American Christmas fantasy comedy film directed by Tim Story, written by Scott Rosenberg, and starring Lil Rel Howery, Chris "Ludacris" Bridges, Teyonah Parris, Oscar Nunez, Madison Skye Validum, and Mary Lynn Rajskub. It tells the story of a social worker and his daughter who help Santa Claus when he is targeted by the minions of a crooked congressman.

Produced by Walt Disney Pictures, Will Packer Productions and Smart Entertainment, the film was released on Disney+ on November 17, 2023.

== Plot ==
Eddie Garrick is a social worker who is cynical about the holidays due to an incident in his youth when a mall store Santa, whom he asked in confidence to help keep his parents together, tried to rob his house.

As an adult, he is separated from his wife Allison and they have a daughter named Charlotte. While Allison does some last-minute shopping, Eddie spends time with Charlotte and heads over to his neighbor's house to feed their cat. He encounters a man dressed as Santa named Nicholas Sinter-Claus, or Nick for short, who claims to be the real Santa. Nick appears to be highly dismissive of everything and is cautious of three people who are following him.

Eddie decides to take Nick to the hospital, believing him to be mentally unhealthy, and Charlotte tags along. Nick proceeds to reveal details about himself and Charlotte that convinces her that he is the real Santa. The three grunts proceed to chase after Eddie, Nick, and Charlotte who escape, but their car breaks down. They hail a taxi, but when they are being followed again, Nick rolls out of the car and hides in a club where everyone is dressed as Santa.

Eddie and Charlotte follow him and lose the trailers after getting rescued by a family named the Truckles. The Truckles are obsessed with Santa and using their equipment were able to track down Nick who once again makes a hasty exit, forcing Eddie and Charlotte to follow him again.

Nick takes Eddie and Charlotte to one of his warehouses which is loaded with many of his on-ground supporters including a couple named Gerald and Lucille, who fix his equipment. Nick reveals why he has been running: one of his stops was the house of Conrad Harf, a trusted congressman who was hiding one of his crooked schemes.

The three people chasing them all night worked for him and Nick accidentally got his tablet mixed up with Conrad's, which contained a list of locations that they were hoping to pave over. Misinterpreting the situation, Eddie believes that Nick is another burglar and calls the police to come and arrest him, against Charlotte's wishes.

At the police station, Nick is taken away, but deduces that the "detectives" taking him are more of Conrad's goons. Eddie realizes that Nick left the tablet with him and manages to unlock it, learning that he was telling the truth. Eddie and Charlotte recruit the Truckles to help locate Nick who has been taken straight to Conrad who is attending the Mayor's Christmas party.

Eddie arrives to free Nick, but they are caught. Now fully believing Nick, Eddie activates his reindeer caller, causing all of Nick's reindeer to appear and beat up the bad guys. Conrad and his associates are arrested, though Nick gives Conrad an Action Arthur figure that he originally wanted as a young boy in good faith. Nick then gets his reindeer and flies away.

Eddie and Charlotte return home to Allison who is in disbelief over their claim that they were hanging out with Santa until Nick arrives to give them one last gift, a dog named Bulldozer, which he had earlier told Eddie he would be giving him. Eddie renews his romance with Allison as he invites the Truckles to spend the holidays with them, while Nick flies off to finish his Christmas deliveries.

== Cast ==
- Lil Rel Howery as Nick
- Chris "Ludacris" Bridges as Eddie Garrick
- Madison Skye Validum as Charlotte Garrick
- Teyonah Parris as Allison Garrick
- Oscar Nunez as Conrad Harf
- Ravi Patel as Peter
- Gina Brillon as Sonya Truckle
- Sebastian Sozzi as Martin Truckle
- Gaby Rosario as Kayleigh Truckle
- Noah Ayden Hernandez as Diego Truckle
- Marcus Lewis as Paul
- Mary Lynn Rajskub as Mary
- Michael H. Cole as Moke
- Kayte Giralt as Ginny
- Vince Pisani as Luther
- Kevin Connolly as Gerald
- Zulay Henao as Lucille
- David Shae as Detective Bobby Carlotta

== Production ==
On October 26, 2016, Disney was reported to be developing a Christmas family comedy film titled Dashing Through the Snow, with Kevin Hart in negotiations to star. Hart would portray Santa, and Will Packer and John Jacobs would be producing while Rob Burnett was writing the then-current draft based on an original idea by Scott Rosenberg. The film would follow "...a New York City detective who is a workaholic and has a strained relationship with his son. The only thing that may be able to repair the father-son relationship is the one true Santa Claus who has to make the man believe in Christmas magic." A search for a director was "about to get underway", and Kristin Burr was overseeing for Disney.

On August 30, 2022, Ludacris, Lil Rel Howery, and Teyonah Parris were announced to star in the film, the film telling "...the story of a divorced social worker for the Atlanta police department who despises Christmas due to a painful childhood memory. When sent on a call while spending Christmas Eve with his daughter, he inadvertently evokes the wrath of a local politician but meets a man who helps him understand the joy and magic of Christmas." Oscar Nunez, Gina Brillon, Mary Lynn Rajskub, Ravi Patel, Marcus Lewis, Madison Skye Validum, and Sebastian Sozzi were also announced to star, and Tim Story was announced to direct, along with executive produce with Johanna Byer, Ross Fanger, and Zac Unterman. Principal photography was underway in Atlanta, Georgia that same month. Chris Duskin served as the cinematographer for the film.

The visual effects were provided by Cinesite, Crafty Apes, and Mas Effects.

== Music ==
Dashing Through the Snow (Original Soundtrack)

Soundtrack album by Christopher Lennertz
- Released: November 17, 2023
- Recorded: 2023
- Genre: Film score
- Length: 46:43
- Label: Walt Disney
- Producer: Christopher Lennertz

Christopher Lennertz chronology
| The Curse of Bridge Hollow (2022) | Dashing Through the Snow (Original Soundtrack) (2023) | Back in Action (2025) |

On June 26, 2023, it was reported that Christopher Lennertz, a frequent collaborator with Tim Story, would compose the score for Dashing Through the Snow. The soundtrack was released by Walt Disney Records on November 17, 2023, coinciding with the film's release.

=== Track listing ===
| No. | Title | Length |
|---|---|---|
| 1. | "Jingle Bell Rock" (Performed by The Ton3s) | 2:01 |
| 2. | "Dad vs Santa" | 2:01 |
| 3. | "Christmas in a Tree" | 1:19 |
| 4. | "Glitter Trail" | 1:30 |
| 5. | "I'll Be Ham For Christmas" | 2:48 |
| 6. | "Sleigh It Ain't Snow" | 4:09 |
| 7. | "Never Sleigh Never" | 3:25 |
| 8. | "Pull Snowver" | 1:17 |
| 9. | "Too Many Santas" | 1:32 |
| 10. | "Escape Claus" | 2:55 |
| 11. | "Twelve Days of Christmas" | 1:03 |
| 12. | "Toys Not Present" | 0:26 |
| 13. | "Oh Tannen Bam!" | 1:14 |
| 14. | "Yule Be Sorry" | 1:40 |
| 15. | "Dear Santa" | 3:08 |
| 16. | "Insantagation" | 1:00 |
| 17. | "Flight of the Reindeer" | 2:51 |
| 18. | "Believe in Your Elf" | 4:09 |
| 19. | "Ho, Ho, Holiday Finale" | 5:19 |
| 20. | "Santa You're Alright" (Performed by C.S. Armstrong) | 2:49 |
| Total length: | | 46:43 |

== Release ==
When the cast announced on August 30, 2022, Dashing Through the Snow was "set to bow on Disney+ next holiday season." It was released on the streamer on November 17, 2023.

== Reception ==
On the review aggregator website Rotten Tomatoes, 30% of 20 critics' reviews are positive.
