= Bosco (film) =

2024 film by Nicholas Manuel Pino

- Release poster
- Directed by: Nicholas Manuel Pino
- Written by: Nicholas Manuel Pino
- Based on: Chasin' Freedum by Quawntay Adams
- Produced by: Quawntay Adams; Patrick McErlean; Darryll C. Scott; Justin Steele
- Starring: Aubrey Joseph; Nikki Blonsky; D.C. Young Fly; John Lewis; Theo Rossi; Thomas Jane; Tyrese Gibson; Vivica A. Fox
- Cinematography: Michael Alden Lloyd
- Edited by: Gillian L. Hutshing; Sean Ludan
- Music by: Jemarcus Bridges
- Production companies: Fluke Studios; Sugar Studios; The Exchange; Renegade Entertainment
- Distributed by: Peacock
- Release date: February 2, 2024
- Running time: 99 minutes
- Country: United States
- Language: English

Bosco is a 2024 American biographical drama film written and directed by Nicholas Manuel Pino. It is based on the memoir Chasin' Freedum by Quawntay Adams. It stars Aubrey Joseph, Nikki Blonsky, D.C. Young Fly, John Lewis, Theo Rossi, Thomas Jane, Tyrese Gibson, and Vivica A. Fox.

The film was released by Peacock on February 2, 2024.

== Premise ==
The film is based on the true story of Quawntay "Bosco" Adams who was sentenced to 35 years in 2004 for possession of marijuana, and who made a spectacular escape from prison in 2006 with the help of a woman he met through a lonely-hearts ad.

== Cast ==
- Aubrey Joseph as Quawntay Adams
- Nikki Blonsky as Tammy
- John Lewis as The Bull
- D.C. Young Fly as Rooster
- Brandon Rogers as Carlos
- Jim O'Heir as Bo
- Theo Rossi as Ramos
- Thomas Jane as Hunt
- Tyrese Gibson as Tootie
- Vivica A. Fox as Willa

== Production ==
In January 2024, it was announced that a biographical drama thriller film based on a true story of the life of convict Quawntay Adams and titled Bosco would be released for the streaming service Peacock, with Nicholas Manuel Pino writing and directing, and Aubrey Joseph, Nikki Blonsky, Tyrese Gibson, Theo Rossi, Thomas Jane, and Vivica A. Fox joining the cast.

== Release ==
Bosco was released by Peacock on February 2, 2024.

== Reception ==
On the review aggregator website Rotten Tomatoes, 71% of seven critics' reviews are positive, with an average rating of 6/10.

== See also ==
- List of prison films
