= DigitalLivesMatter =

- Directed by: Terri J. Vaughn
- Written by: Cas Sigers-Beedles
- Produced by: David Banner; D.C. Young Fly
- Starring: Rashan Ali; Carlos Aviles; Franco Castan; Benjamin David
- Edited by: Victor V. Hogan II
- Music by: Matthew Head
- Distributed by: Novus Content
- Release date: August 1, 2016 (USA)
- Country: USA
- Language: English

#DigitalLivesMatter is a 2016 Comedy film, directed by Terri J. Vaughn. The film stars D.C. Young Fly as a social media superstar who finds out that his online accounts have been hacked.

== Cast ==
- D.C. Young Fly ... Himself
- Carlos Aviles ... Mouse
- Franco Castan ... Duncan Davis
- Will Durrett ... Rex
- Tyler Does ... Dale
- Algy Fonts ... Roman
- Rashan Ali ... News Reporter
- Cornelius Boyd SR. ... Simon
