= Freshman Dorm =

American drama television series

- Developed by: Janet Kovalcik
- Starring: Matthew Fox; Robyn Lively; Casper Van Dien; Arlene Taylor; Kevin Mambo; Paige French
- Composer: John Debney
- Country of origin: United States
- Original language: English
- No. of seasons: 1
- No. of episodes: 5

Production
- Executive producer: Steve Tisch
- Running time: 60 minutes
- Production companies: The Steve Tisch Company; Financial Film Services; MGM/UA

Original release
- Network: CBS
- Release: August 11 – September 9, 1992

Freshman Dorm is an American drama television series which debuted in the summer of 1992 and aired 5 episodes on CBS. It is based on the young adult fiction series of the same name written by Linda Alper Cooney.

== Plot ==
The series followed the lives of three dormmates, Molly, K.C. and Lulu, who live in a co-ed dormitory at the fictional Western Pacific University in southern California.

== Cast ==
- Paige French as Louise "Lulu" Victoria Abercrombie: a pretty, spoiled rich girl from New York City who used anything to get what she wanted
- Robyn Lively as Molly Flynn: a theater major from Milwaukee, who had aspirations of becoming an actress
- Arlene Taylor as K.C. Richards (née Kamala Consuelo Ricardo): a lower-class Hispanic girl from Los Angeles on financial aid who is ashamed of her background
- Matthew Fox as Danny Foley: Molly's boyfriend who is on athletic scholarship
- Casper Van Dien as Zack Taylor: a free-spirited surfer with little interest in his studies
- Kevin Mambo as Alex Woods: Zack's studious roommate, a biology major

== Episodes ==
No.	Title	Original release date	Prod. code
1	"Pilot"	August 11, 1992	9160
2	"Sex, Truth and Theatre"	August 18, 1992	6304
3	"The Last Sonnet"	August 25, 1992	6301
4	"The Scarlett Letter"	September 2, 1992	6302
5	"My Boyfriend's Back"	September 9, 1992	6303

== Production ==
Exterior scenes for the show were shot at Whittier College.
