= The Pickup (film) =

2025 American action comedy film by Tim Story

- Release poster
- Directed by: Tim Story
- Written by: Matt Mider; Kevin Burrows
- Produced by: John Davis; John Fox; Eddie Murphy; Tim Story; Charisse Hewitt-Webster
- Starring: Eddie Murphy; Pete Davidson; Eva Longoria; Keke Palmer
- Cinematography: Larry Blanford
- Edited by: Craig Alpert
- Music by: Christopher Lennertz
- Production companies: Davis Entertainment; Eddie Murphy Productions; The Story Company
- Distributed by: Amazon MGM Studios (Note: Released through the Metro-Goldwyn-Mayer banner.)
- Release dates: July 27, 2025 (Los Angeles); August 6, 2025 (United States)
- Running time: 96 minutes
- Country: United States
- Language: English

The Pickup is a 2025 American heist action comedy film produced and directed by Tim Story and written by Matt Mider and Kevin Burrows. The film stars Eddie Murphy, Pete Davidson, Eva Longoria, and Keke Palmer. The film was released by Amazon Prime Video on August 6, 2025, and received generally negative reviews.

== Plot ==
Russell Pierce, a veteran armored car driver nearing retirement, and Travis Stolly, a rookie who aspires to be a police officer, team up for the first time on duty. While on duty, criminal mastermind Zoe ambushes them with Banner and Miguel. During the intense chase and being outmatched, Russell attempts to surrender the money from the truck for their life but discovering that the supposed money they are transporting are full of contraband. Banner and Miguel's car flips over during a car chase after Russell throws the money contained the dye packs at their cars, but Zoe ultimately manages to hijack the armored car. Travis recognizes Zoe, and remembers their one-night stand the evening before. She had gotten him drunk on their date, and he told her everything about his work and the schedule of his route. Assuming that Banner and Miguel are dead after both of their vehicles have violently crashed, Zoe asks Russell and Travis to cooperate with her and reveals that her goal wasn't to steal the money or the contraband from the truck but to rob the armored vehicle itself as she needs an armored truck in a plan to take $60 million cash pickup from a casino.

Banner and Miguel survive the car accident. Unhappy that Zoe had abandoned them, they attempt to catch up with the armored car. Travis, feeling used by Zoe, still has feelings for her. Zoe confesses to Travis and Russell that several years ago, a fire broke out in the casino where her father worked as security guard. During the fire, the lockdown sequence was initiated to protect the money from catching fire but did not have manual overdrive for the personnel to get out to safety. Zoe's father sacrificed himself to hold the metal door for his co-workers to escape. Despite his heroism, the casino did not extend any compensation to her family for the faulty security system. The adult Zoe now plans to take the casino's money to get revenge. In front of the casino, Russell's wife Natalie finds him through mobile phone positioning, where she is taken hostage by Zoe and tied up in the car with Travis. As they approach the vault, they encounter a photoshot of a famous mixed martial arts fighter and Zoe lies to him that his rival is trashing him on the internet, causing him to leave the vault. Russell and Zoe successfully steal $60 million in cash from the casino. On their way out, the casino manager recognizes her and apologize for her father situation and blames the higher-ups for not compensating her father when they had a chance. The duo is then ambushed by Banner and Miguel. Banner takes Natalie hostage and chases Zoe, who drives away with the money; Russell and Travis accidentally run over Miguel with an armored car. A large number of police officers chase them for the casino's money. Clark calls the duo to complain about the late delivery only to shock that they are being chased by the cops on live TV and Travis gives him the middle finger.

At a small airstrip, the armored car catches fire and explodes after a chase. Banner opens fire at Russell, Travis and Zoe but is knocked unconscious by Natalie. Russell reunites with Natalie, and Zoe says goodbye to Travis before leaving in a small plane she had prepared in advance. Afterwards, Russell and Travis are found not liable for the events by the police as they believe the duo are forced to do the robbery at gunpoint. Six months later, Travis becomes deputy sheriff and contacts Zoe who is now living in luxury in Bali. Meanwhile Russell, now retired, is running a bed and breakfast with Natalie. He receives a box of money from Travis and Zoe.

In a mid-credits scene, the museum curator calls the armored car company to complain about the damaged capuchin monkey, but Clark angrily insists that the capuchin monkey must have already been damaged before the transport.

== Cast ==
- Eddie Murphy as Russell Pierce
- Pete Davidson as Travis Stolly
- Keke Palmer as Zoe
- Jack Kesy as Banner
- Ismael Cruz Córdova as Miguel
- Eva Longoria as Natalie Pierce
- Andrew Dice Clay as Clark
- Jef Holbrook as Mikey
- Marshawn Lynch as Chop Shop
- Roman Reigns as MMA fighter
- Lara Grice as a waitress

== Production ==
The film was greenlit by Amazon MGM Studios in March 2023 with Eddie Murphy attached to star. Tim Story directed and produced the film, through his The Story Company. John Davis and John Fox also produced for Davis Entertainment. Eddie Murphy and Charisse Hewitt-Webster produced via Eddie Murphy Productions.

In December 2023, Keke Palmer and Pete Davidson joined the cast. In February 2024, Andrew Dice Clay, Eva Longoria, Ismael Cruz Córdova, Jack Kesy and Marshawn Lynch joined the cast.

Principal photography began in Atlanta in April 2024. On April 20, during second unit filming of an action scene, an accident happened in which an armored truck and a car collided, resulting in both vehicles rolling over and leaving several crew members injured. Additional scenes were filmed in Rome, Georgia.

== Release ==
The Pickup was released by Amazon Prime Video on August 6, 2025.

== Reception ==
On the review aggregation website Rotten Tomatoes, 24% of 72 critics' reviews are positive, with an average rating of 4.1/10. The website's consensus reads, "With Eddie Murphy and Pete Davidson's comedic chemistry fatally unbalanced, it's left to a game Keke Palmer and Eva Longoria to pick up the slack as The Pickup puts down too little." Metacritic, which uses a weighted average, assigned the film a score of 38 out of 100, based on 14 critics, indicating "generally unfavorable" reviews.

Lovia Gyarkye of The Hollywood Reporter wrote that the film "swerves and jerks to a mildly satisfying conclusion. The film boasts a strong comic cast with Murphy, Davidson and Palmer at the lead. Their chemistry is naturally compelling, which helps us buy into their increasingly ridiculous situation."

Christy Lemire of RogerEbert.com gave the film one out of four stars and wrote, "The Pickup is as generic and forgettable as its title suggests: a bland action-comedy that will surely end up being one of the year's worst movies, if only for the egregious way it squanders its talented cast."

=== Awards and nominations ===
Award	Ceremony	Category	Recipient	Result	Ref
Hollywood Music in Media Awards	November 19, 2025	Original Score – TV/Streamed Movie	Christopher Lennertz	Nominated	
