= Hair Show =

- Directed by: Leslie Small
- Written by: Andrea Allen-Wiley; Devon Greggory; Sherri A. McGee
- Produced by: Janis Woody; Jeff Clanagan; Kimberly Ogletree; Leslie Small; Magic Johnson; Nikkole Denson
- Starring: Kellita Smith; Mo'Nique; David Ramsey; Gina Torres; Taraji P. Henson
- Cinematography: Keith L. Smith
- Edited by: Hector H. Kron; Suzanne Hines
- Music by: Kennard Ramsey
- Distributed by: Innovation Film Group; UrbanWorks Entertainment
- Release date: October 17, 2004
- Running time: 104 minutes
- Country: United States
- Language: English
- Box office: $305,281

Hair Show is a 2004 comedy film directed by Leslie Small starring Mo'Nique and Kellita Smith. It is the theatrical directorial debut of Leslie Small.

== Plot ==
Peaches (Mo'Nique), a hair stylist from Baltimore, and her estranged sister, Angela (Kellita Smith), the owner of an upscale salon in Beverly Hills, get reacquainted when Peaches decides to attend a celebration for Angela in Los Angeles. The reunion is bittersweet and worsens when Angela finds out that Peaches is on the run from the IRS and only has 60 days to pay $50,000 in back taxes. After some hilarious moments and passionate exchanges, the two sisters join forces to fight off a pesky rival salon owner Marcella (Gina Torres) and save Peaches from her troubles by competing for a lucrative cash prize and bragging rights at the city's annual hair show.

== Cast ==
- Mo'Nique as Patricia "Peaches" Whittaker
- Kellita Smith as Angela "Angelle" Whittaker
- Gina Torres as Marcella
- David Ramsey as Cliff
- Taraji P. Henson as Tiffany
- Keiko Agena as Jun Ni
- Cee Cee Michaela as Simone
- Joe Torry as Brian
- Andre B. Blake as Gianni
- Bryce Wilson as Drake
- Vivica A. Fox as herself
- Tommy "Tiny" Lister Jr. as Agent Little
- Tom Virtue as Agent Scott
- Reagan Gomez-Preston as Fiona
- James Avery as Seymour Gold
- Tami Roman as Zora

== Nominations ==
2005 BET Comedy Awards

- Outstanding Directing for a Theatrical Film — Leslie Small
- Outstanding Lead Actress in a Theatrical Film — Mo'Nique
- Outstanding Writing for a Theatrical Film — Andrea Allen-Wiley, Devon Watkins, Sherri A. McGee
