= Undercover Brother 2 =

- Poster
- Directed by: Leslie Small
- Written by: Ian Edwards; Stephen Mazur
- Based on: Undercover Brother by John Ridley
- Produced by: Mike Elliott; Joseph P. Genier; Hal Lieberman
- Starring: Michael Jai White
- Cinematography: Keith L. Smith
- Edited by: Heath Ryan
- Music by: Stanley Clarke
- Production companies: Universal 1440 Entertainment; Hal Lieberman Company; Imagine Entertainment
- Distributed by: Universal Pictures Home Entertainment
- Release date: November 5, 2019
- Running time: 84 minutes
- Country: United States
- Language: English

Undercover Brother 2 is a 2019 American action comedy blaxploitation film directed by Leslie Small and starring Michael Jai White. It is a sequel to the 2002 film Undercover Brother.

== Plot ==
Undercover Brother tracks The Man to his lair in Vienna, Austria, but he and his younger brother Lionel are buried in an avalanche. Holding their breath, they survive for 16 years before being rescued. Undercover Brother is left in a coma and his younger brother Lionel is recruited by B.R.O.T.H.E.R.H.O.O.D. to aid them in their work.

Lionel disguises himself as a white cowboy and befriends The Man, who has fallen on hard times and become homeless due to losing control of his company to his gay son Manson. Manson begins releasing a drug called "Woke" on the population to cause them to be hypersensitive and argumentative with each other, thereby dividing the population and installing himself as leader.

The members of B.R.O.T.H.E.R.H.O.O.D. identify the café chain Resistance Brews as a front for Manson, who is putting "Woke" in the coffee. Lionel is disguised as a hipster and sent to Resistance Brews, but The Man follows him and attempts to take control of his empire back from his son. Manson ingests an ultra-pure form of the drug known as "Woke AF", causing his head to explode. The Man splashes some "Woke AF" on Lionel then escapes and sets up a chain of cafés known as Blak Coffee to distribute his "Woke AF".

Undercover Brother awakens from his coma and stows away back to New York City aboard a ship transporting Vienna Sausages. Together with B.R.O.T.H.E.R.H.O.O.D., Undercover Brother and Lionel infiltrate The Man's organization dressed as members of the Ku Klux Klan. They capture The Man but are arrested when the police arrive, allowing The Man to escape.

Undercover Brother and Lionel eventually escaped from the police and still hunting down The Man.

== Cast ==
- Michael Jai White as "Undercover Brother"
- Barry Bostwick as "The Man"
- Laila Odom as Chief Honey
- Jeff Daniel Phillips as Actor
- Tyler Crumley as Young Manson
- Vince Swann as Lionel
- Kayla Eva as Nurse Gretchen
- Melanie Loren as "Unattainable Sistah"
- Lindsay Lamb as Iona
- Gary Owen as "Military Brother"
- Affion Crockett as "Sarcastic Brother"

== Filming locations ==
Filming took place in Atlanta, Georgia.

== Release ==
The film was released direct-to-video on November 5, 2019.

== Reception ==
The film received generally negative reviews, with many critics noting the lack of any cast members from the original film returning to reprise their roles and the minimal amount of time Michael Jai White spends on screen in the actual film.

Reviewer Rob Hunter of /Film called the drop in quality "severe" in comparison to the 2002 film and criticized the film's "lack of concern for quality", ultimately calling the film "a dud". He concluded: "It’s not the least bit funny, and its desperation makes it even less so. Undercover Brother 2 doesn’t deserve to see the light of day."

Reviewer Jordi of The Serious Tip wrote: "Overall, Undercover Brother 2 was very underwhelming. It was the result of many bad decisions. And I made a bad decision in buying it."

World Film Geek called the film "not so solid" and gave it a rating of C−, writing: "Undercover Brother 2 is a very unnecessary sequel that attempts to launch a new star".
