= Rotimi (actor) =

American actor and singer (born 1988)

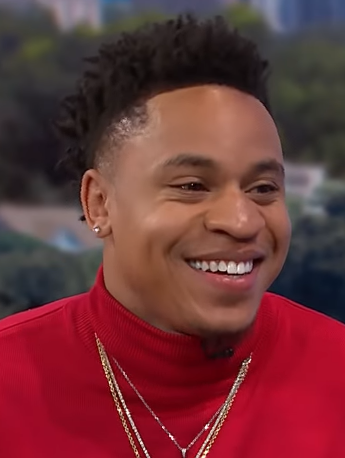
- Rotimi during an interview in May 2019
- Born: Olurotimi Akinosho; November 30, 1988 (age 37); Maplewood, New Jersey, U.S.
- Education: Northwestern University
- Occupations: Actor; singer; model
- Years active: 2011–present
- Spouse: Vanessa Mdee
- Children: 2
- Musical career
- Genre: R&B
- Instrument: Vocals
- Labels: G-Unit; Empire
- Website: rotimimusic.com

Olurotimi Akinosho (born November 30, 1988), known professionally as Rotimi, is a Nigerian-American actor and singer. He is known for his role as Darius Morrison on the Starz series Boss, and as Andre Coleman on Power, then as Charles on The Chi; However on June 29, 2024 he confirmed that he would be joining full time in season 7.

== Early life and education ==
Rotimi was born in Maplewood, New Jersey to a Nigerian family of Yoruba and Igbo heritage, his father is an investment banker from Yorubaland while his Igbo mother is a civil servant from Imo State. He attended Columbia High School, where he was on both the varsity basketball team and the choir. He continued his studies at Northwestern University and graduated with a bachelor's degree in Communication with a minor in Business in 2010.

== Career ==
=== Acting ===
At his first trial with acting, Rotimi auditioned and subsequently got his first acting role on Boss as drug dealer Darius Morrison. Rotimi also appeared in three episodes of ABC's Betrayal.

Rotimi made his silver screen debut in the film Black Nativity (2013). Following this, he starred in Imperial Dreams at the 2014 Sundance Film Festival, which later won for "Best of NEXT".

Rotimi next appeared in the high grossing film, Divergent (2014). In 2016, Rotimi also acted in the movie Deuces alongside Lance Gross and Larenz Tate.

He was added to the cast of Starz' TV series Power as a series regular, in the role of Andre Coleman, the quick-tempered young protégé of the character Ghost. Rotimi was also cast in a recurring role on Battle Creek as Danny.

=== Music ===
A contemporary R&B artist, Rotimi released two digital mixtapes, titled The Resume (March 8, 2011) and While You Wait (November 30, 2011). His videos have been featured on international and American based entertainment media including MTV, MTV Base, and VH1 Soul.

Rotimi has performed on stage, opening for Jennifer Hudson, T.I., Estelle, and NERD; he also performed on BET's show 106 and Park and appeared in R&B singer Keyshia Cole's music video "Trust and Believe" as Cole's unfaithful boyfriend.

Rotimi garnered music placement with "I'm the One" on the first episode of Boss. In 2015, American rapper and executive producer of Power, 50 Cent signed Rotimi to his label, G-Unit Records. He also released his first G-Unit single "Lotto" featuring 50 Cent.

In 2016, Rotimi released "Doin it", a single from his 5-track project, Summer Bangerz. In 2017 he released his debut EP called Jeep Music Vol. 1.

In 2019, he released a single titled "Love Riddim" which has garnered attention from both old fans and newly made ones.

=== Fashion ===
Rotimi is the lead model/spokesperson of rapper T.I.'s AKOO Clothing 2012 Spring/Summer campaign, April 2, 2012.

== Personal life ==
On November 25, 2019, Rotimi shared a picture of himself and Tanzanian singer Vanessa Mdee posing in an elevator, with Mdee also confirming their relationship by posting the same picture with a different caption. Rotimi told the story of how the two met at a party and hit it off and Mdee also said in an interview how she knew he was her husband, only two days after meeting him. In a video posted on Instagram with Rotimi who was later joined by Mdee, the pair revealed that they both had tattoos of each other's name on their bodies; her (middle) name, Hau, on his right wrist and his name, Rotimi, on her chest. They also have matching tattoos of the number 1045 on their wrists.

In December 2020, Rotimi got engaged to Vanessa.

The pair welcomed their first child (a boy) Seven Adeoluwa Akinosho in September 2021. Similarly in March 2023, Rotimi announced the arrival of his second child (a girl) Imani Enioluwa Akinosho.

== Discography ==
Studio albums

- All or Nothing (2021)
- In My Heart In My Veins (2024)

== Filmography ==
Film
Year	Title	Role	Notes
2013	Black Nativity	Officer Butch McDaniels	
2014	Divergent	Ezra	
2015	Darkest Before Dawn	Manny	Short film
2017	Imperial Dreams	Wayne	
2017	Burning Sands	Edwin	
2017	Deuces	Face	
2018	Acts of Violence	Frank	
2020	Singlehollic	Sam Bishop	
2020	True to The Game 2: Gena's Story	Vaughn	
2021	Coming 2 America	Idi Izzi	
2021	Favorite Son	Blain	Executive Producer
2021	For the Love of Money	Tre	
2023	House Party	Guile	

Television
Year	Title	Role	Notes
2011	Cooper and Stone	Ty	Unsold pilot
2011–12	Boss	Darius Morrison	18 episodes
2013	Betrayal	Lil' D	3 episodes
2015	Battle Creek	Danny	2 episodes
2015–2020	Power	Andre "Dre" Coleman	Series Regular
2017	BET Experience	Host	Television special
2018	Law & Order: Special Victims Unit	Malik	Guest Star
2023	Will Trent	Charles	Guest Star
2024–2026	The Chi	Charles	Recurring (seasons 7–8; guest role in season 6)

== Tours ==
- Don't Matter Tour (with August Alsina) (2017)
- In my heart, in my vein Tour (2025)
