= Kevin Hart: Zero F**ks Given =

- Promotional release poster
- Directed by: Leslie Small
- Starring: Kevin Hart
- Edited by: Guy Harding
- Distributed by: Netflix
- Release date: November 17, 2020
- Running time: 69 minutes
- Country: United States
- Language: English

Kevin Hart: Zero F**ks Given is a 2020 American stand-up comedy special by comedian Kevin Hart. According to Hart, the special would be "like no other" having "zero filter" and making "zero apologies." It was filmed in September 2020 in the living room of his home in Los Angeles. In it, he touches on topics such as group chats with male friends, sex after 40, and dealing with life during the COVID-19 pandemic.

The special was released on Netflix on November 17, 2020.
