= Comedy Central Films =

Film production arm of Comedy Central

- Type: Division
- Industry: Film
- Founded: April 23, 1995; 31 years ago
- Defunct: December 24, 2014; 11 years ago
- Fate: Closed
- Successor: MTV Entertainment Studios
- Headquarters: Los Angeles, California, U.S.
- Products: Motion pictures
- Owner: Comedy Central; Viacom
- Parent: Comedy Central

Comedy Central Films was the motion picture production arm of the adult-oriented cable channel Comedy Central. The studio produces comedy films aimed at a mature audience and based on Comedy Central shows. Many of which were distributed by Paramount Pictures.

The first project developed for the unit was South Park: Bigger, Longer & Uncut.

== Filmography ==
These are films that were theatrically released and based on Comedy Central properties.

- South Park: Bigger, Longer & Uncut (1999) (with Paramount Pictures, Warner Bros. Pictures, Scott Rudin Productions, and Braniff Productions)
- Windy City Heat (2003) (with Jackhole Productions)
- The Hebrew Hammer (2003) (with ContentFilm and Strand Releasing)
- Strangers with Candy (2006) (with ThinkFilm)
- Reno 911!: Miami (2007) (with 20th Century Fox, Paramount Pictures, and Jersey Films)
- The Drawn Together Movie: The Movie! (2010) (direct-to-video)
- New Kids Turbo (2010) (Netherlands)
- New Kids Nitro (2011) (Netherlands)
- Kevin Hart: Laugh at My Pain (2011)
- Fists of Legend (2013)
- Jason Nash is Married (2014)
