= Tyler Crumley =

American actor

- Born: January 18, 2007 (age 19); Austell, Georgia, US
- Occupation: Actor
- Years active: 2017-present
- Notable work: Hubie Halloween; Undercover Brother 2 Godzilla: King of the Monsters

Tyler Crumley (born 18 January 2007) is an American actor. He is best known for his appearance as Jonah Rayfield in the episode These Old Bones of the Netflix original series Dolly Parton's Heartstrings, starring Kathleen Turner. The series has been nominated for Outstanding Television Movie at the 72nd Primetime Emmy Awards in 2020.

== Life and work ==
Crumley was born in Austell, Georgia. In 2019, Tyler appeared in Godzilla: King of the Monsters as the young Andrew Russell, son of Mark (Kyle Chandler) and Emma (played by Vera Farmiga), and brother to Madison (played by Millie Bobby Brown).

In 2020, Crumley appeared in Steven Spielberg's reboot of Amazing Stories for Apple TV+. He stars as Dylan in "Dynoman and The Volt", the grandson of the late Robert Forster. In the same year, Tyler appeared as Andy O'Doyle in the Adam Sandler Netflix comedy Hubie Halloween, a character from Sandler's Billy Madison; both films were produced by Happy Madison Productions.

== Filmography ==
=== Film ===
Year	Title	Role	Notes
2018	Tag	Young Chilli	
2019	Undercover Brother 2	Young Manson	
2019	Godzilla: King of the Monsters	Young Andrew	
2019	Driven	Tom Hoffman	
2020	Hubie Halloween	Andy O'Doyle	

=== Television ===
Year	Title	Role	Notes
2017	Still the King: Reign of Tears	Bobby	
2019	Dolly Parton's Heartstrings: These Old Bones	Jonah Rayfield	
2020	Robbie	JP	
2020	Amazing Stories: Dynoman and the Volt	Dylan	

=== Video games ===
Year	Title	Role	Notes
2018	Transference	Benjamin	
