= Nancy Gregory =

American writer and choreographer

Nancy Jean Gregory
- Born: February 27, 1949; Youngstown, Ohio
- Died: August 13, 2020 (aged 71); Los Angeles, California
- Occupations: Writer; choreographer; producer; director
- Notable work: Jambalaya, the Musical
- Awards: BroadwayWorld New Orleans Awards

Nancy Jean Gregory (February 27, 1949 – August 13, 2020) was an American writer, choreographer, producer, and director. Over a five‑decade career, she created and staged hundreds of theatrical and multimedia productions.

== Early life and education ==
Nancy Jean Gregory was born in Youngstown, Ohio, on February 27, 1949. She later relocated to Los Angeles, where she lived for much of her life.

Gregory held a master's degree in ballet and taught dance at the University of California, Los Angeles. During her career, she performed with artists including Gene Kelly, Juliet Prowse, Lucie Arnaz, and Ann Miller. She also appeared in the film Winter Kills.

== Career ==
Gregory began working professionally in choreography and theatrical production in the 1970s. She directed, produced, wrote, and choreographed hundreds of stage presentations, large‑scale musicals, international corporate events, sporting ceremonies, television specials and films. Her work spanned major cities and countries worldwide including Los Angeles, Tokyo, Las Vegas, Paris, New York, Moscow, England, Germany, Italy, and Australia.

She also contributed to major sporting events such as the Super Bowl and music video productions such as Michael Nesmith's Grammy-winning video special Elephant Parts, as well as music videos for The Motels, Kim Carnes, and Cameo.

In the 1980s, Gregory was known in Los Angeles for her dance‑fashion shows and aerobics‑themed programming, active in both entertainment and community events.

== Jambalaya, the Musical ==
In 2016, Gregory wrote, directed and choreographed Jambalaya, the Musical, a Louisiana‑themed stage production celebrating Cajun and Creole heritage. The musical premiered at the Orpheum Theatre in New Orleans on November 30, 2016.

Kennard Ramsey served as the musical director and composer of the production. Jeff Barry contributed original songs with production partner Clarence Jey with the exception of the finale piece "Put It in The Pot", written by Ramsey and Roxanne Seeman.

== Awards and recognition ==
=== BroadwayWorld New Orleans Awards ===
Year	Nominee / work	Award	Result
2018	Jambalaya, the Musical	Best direction of a musical	Won
