= For the Love of Money (2021 film) =

Thriller film by Leslie Small

- Directed by: Leslie Small
- Written by: Leslie Small; Timothy Allen Smith; Zadia Ife
- Produced by: Melissa A. Young; Melvin Childs
- Starring: Keri Hilson; Rotimi; Jason Mitchell; D.C. Young Fly; Katt Williams; LisaRaye McCoy; Keith Sweat
- Cinematography: Keith Smith
- Edited by: Heath Ryan
- Music by: Alan Ari Lazar
- Production companies: Melvin Childs Presents; Pace Pictures; Rebellium Films
- Distributed by: Freestyle Releasing; Global View Entertainment
- Release date: November 24, 2021
- Running time: 109 minutes
- Country: United States
- Language: English
- Box office: $480,774

For the Love of Money is a 2021 American crime thriller film directed by Leslie Small, who is also the co-writer along with Zadia Ife and Timothy Allen Smith. The film stars Keri Hilson, Rotimi, Jason Mitchell, D.C. Young Fly, Katt Williams, LisaRaye McCoy and Keith Sweat. Hilson makes her big screen debut as a lead actress in this film playing single mother who faces a custody battle with her husband and the weight of mounting financial problems.

The film was released in selected theatres on November 24, 2021, by Freestyle Releasing. It grossed $480,774. For the Love of Money later was released on Blu-ray, digital and DVD on March 22, 2022, by Lionsgate Home Entertainment.

== Cast ==
- Keri Hilson as Gigi Davis
- Rotimi as Tre
- Jason Mitchell as Gregory
- D.C. Young Fly as Bobby
- Katt Williams as Pastor G
- LisaRaye McCoy as Dahlia
- Keith Sweat as Chris

Singers Lyfe Jennings and Latto also appear as themselves in uncredited cameos.

== Reception ==
Film critic Roger Moore of Movie Nation wrote in his review: "All that a cast filled with music personalities adds to the dull, trashy money-laundering melodrama “For the Love of Money” is the occasional pause for a song. And the last thing this movie should do is pause. It's just as well that so much of the acting is handled by non-actors, as it'd be a shame to burn through the Screen Actors’ Guild's finest trying to wring something out of this sloppy, cliche-ridden script." Amari Allah from Wherever I Look gave it a positive review and praised Katt Williams's performance, writing:

Katt Williams playing cool, calm, collected, with someone as an enforcer, is the most hilarious thing to watch – and the man doesn’t tell one joke. I’d even say, if this was made into a series, like True To The Game, he’d have to be a focal point."
