= Kevin Hart: I'm a Grown Little Man =

- Starring: Kevin Hart
- Release date: February 3, 2009
- Country: United States
- Language: English

Kevin Hart: I'm a Grown Little Man is a stand-up comedy special released on February 3, 2009, filmed from the Skirball Center for the Performing Arts, which was directed by Shannon Hartman, produced by Michelle Caputo, and written by Kevin Hart.
