= Tim Story =

American film director

- Born: Timothy Kevin Story; March 14, 1970 (age 56); Los Angeles, California, U.S.
- Other name: M.C. Taste
- Education: USC School of Cinematic Arts (1991)
- Occupations: Film director; producer; editor
- Years active: 1997–present
- Title: Founder of The Story Company
- Spouse: Vicky Story (m. 2003)
- Children: 3

Timothy Kevin Story (born March 14, 1970) is an American film director, producer, and editor. He is best known for Barbershop (2002), Fantastic Four (2005), and the Ride Along franchise. He has been nominated for two NAACP Image Awards for Outstanding Directing in a Feature Film/Television Movie in 2006 and 2014.

He is the founder of The Story Company, a production company co-founded with his future wife Vicky in 1996. He is the first African-American film director to have grossed over US$1 billion at the box office.

== Early life ==
Story was born in Los Angeles on March 13, 1970. From a young age, he made home movies with an 8mm movie camera when his brother became bored using it. Story attended LA's Westchester High School, with jazz pianist Eric Reed and actresses Regina King and Nia Long. He was senior class president at Westchester High. He graduated from the USC School of Cinematic Arts in 1991.

While in high school, Story briefly attempted a career in hip-hop music, performing under the stage name M.C. Taste. He was part of the rap group T.D.F, who signed with Ice-T's record label Rhyme Syndicate. The group made its debut on the song "T.D.F. Connection" from the label's compilation album Rhyme Syndicate Comin' Through (1988). A group member was shot and killed prior to them being signed to Warner Bros. Records. Story later turned his attention to directing feature films.

== Film career ==
Story made his feature debut with One of Us Tripped (1997), where he followed the model detailed by Kevin Smith in how he had made Clerks (1994) on a modest budget; the resulting movie, made for $30,000 on 16 mm with a crew of one, the movie made its money back mostly on a distribution deal. His second movie The Firing Squad (1999) went from a budget of $60,000 to $200,000 and sent him into debt that he had to solve by doing music videos. The experience filming the videos would serve him well with Barbershop, with the resulting success making him a mainstream director, which continued with Taxi (2004). The early cut of the film impressed 20th Century Fox enough to offer him the chance to direct Fantastic Four; he was also a fan of the comics. At the time, the film would be the highest-grossing superhero movie by an African-American director. He reflected on the experience making them as one with multiple lessons: "With those types of big movies, you're directing three movies. There's the movie you're shooting, there's the second-unit action stuff, and there's the visual effects movie. You've got to learn how to deal with all of them. The other thing I learned from those two Fantastic Four movies, is that sometimes you can be too lax on how much control you give to the visual effects team, or the production design team, or whoever. If you end up in situations and you're not happy with certain things, it's because you didn't stay on top of them.”

== Filmography ==
Film

Year	Title	Director	Producer	Notes
1997	One of Us Tripped	Yes	No	Also editor
1999	The Firing Squad	Yes	No	Also editor and writer
2002	Barbershop	Yes	No	Also executive soundtrack producer
2004	Taxi	Yes	No	
2005	Fantastic Four	Yes	No	
2007	Fantastic Four: Rise of the Silver Surfer	Yes	No	
2009	Hurricane Season	Yes	No	
2012	Think Like a Man	Yes	No	
2014	Ride Along	Yes	No	
2014	Think Like a Man Too	Yes	No	
2016	Ride Along 2	Yes	No	
2019	Shaft	Yes	Executive	
2021	Tom and Jerry	Yes	Executive	Voice of Pigeon Announcer
2022	The Blackening	Yes	Yes	
2023	Praise This	No	Yes	
2023	Dashing Through the Snow	Yes	No	
2025	The Pickup	Yes	Yes	
2026	72 Hours	Yes	Yes	
2026	The Cat in the Hat	No	Executive	
TBA	Ride Along 3 †	Yes	Yes	

Stand-up film

- Kevin Hart: Laugh at My Pain (2011)
- Kevin Hart: Let Me Explain (2013)
- Kevin Hart: What Now? (2016)

Television

Year	Title	Director	Executive producer	Notes
2006	Standoff	Yes	Yes	Directed episodes "Pilot" and "Borderline"
2010	CSI: Miami	Yes	No	Episode "On the Hook"
2012	Supah Ninjas	Yes	No	Episode "Limelight"
2017	Scorpion	Yes	No	Episode "Sharknerdo"
2017	White Famous	Yes	Yes	Directed episodes "Pilot", "Heat", "Woo", and "Zero F**ks Given"
2018	Prince of Peoria	No	Yes	
2020	#blackAF	No	No	As himself in Episode 5, "yo, between you and me... this is because of slavery"
2021	Queens	Yes	Yes	Directed episodes "1999" and "Heart Of Queens"

== Music videos ==
- "Do You Love Me" by Benito (1996)
- "Straight From The Dec" by Ghetto Mafia (1997)
- "I Can't Feel It (Remix)" by Ghetto Mafia (1997)
- "You Ain't Heard Nothin Yet" by Benito (1997)
- "I Do" by Jon B. (1998)
- "Cool Relax" by Jon B. (1998)
- "Remember When" by Color Me Badd (1998)
- "I'll Be Around" by Rahsun featuring Big Pun (1998)
- "What" by Rahsun (1998)
- "Sweet Lady" by Tyrese (1998)
- "Are U Still Down" by Jon B. feat. 2Pac (1998)
- "I Tried" by 4Kast (1998)
- "Nitty Gritty" by Jayo Felony (1998)
- "Cheers 2 U" by Playa (1998)
- "He Can't Love U" by Jagged Edge (1999)
- "Get Gone" by Ideal (1999)
- "Creep Inn" by Ideal (1999)
- "Crave" by Marc Dorsey (1999)
- "I Drive Myself Crazy" by 'N Sync (1999)
- "Tell Me It's Real" by K-Ci & JoJo (1999)
- "Lately" by Tyrese (1999)
- "Take Your Time" by Pete Rock feat. Loose Ends (1999)
- "Shorty Got Her Eyes On Me" by Donell Jones (1999)
- "One Night Stand" by J-Shin featuring LaTocha Scott (1999)
- "Ooh Wee Wee" by Cherokee (1999)
- "Ghetto Star" by Bad Azz (1999)
- "The Best Man I Can Be" by Ginuwine, Tyrese, Case, RL (1999)
- "It Feels So Good" by Sonique (2000)
- "My First Love" by Avant feat. Keke Wyatt (2000)
- "Ryde or Die Chick" by The Lox feat. Eve and Timbaland (2000)
- "Mr. Too Damn Good" by Gerald Levert (2000)
- "Sugar" by Don Philip (2000)
- "Wild Out" by The Lox (2000)
- "Love Me Now" by Beenie Man (2000)
- "Let's Get Married" by Jagged Edge (2000)
- "How Long" by L.V. (2000)
- "Why You Wanna Keep Me From My Baby" by Guy (2000)
- "Monica" by Before Dark (2000)
- "Once My Shhh Always my Shhh" by Sam Salter (2000)
- "Brown Skin" by India.Arie (2001)
- "Nasty Girl" by Queens cast: Brandy, Eve, Naturi Naughton, and Nadine Velazquez (2021)

== Collaborations ==
Collaborator	One of Us Tripped (1997)	The Firing Squad (1999)	Barbershop (2002)	Taxi (2004)	Fantastic Four and Rise of the Silver Surfer (2005–2007)	Hurricane Season (2009)	Think Like a Man (2012)	Ride Along (2014)	Think Like a Man Too (2014)	Ride Along 2 (2016)	Shaft (2019)	Tom and Jerry (2021)	The Blackening (2022)	Dashing Through the Snow (2023)	The Pickup (2025)	72 Hours (2026)	Total
Ice Cube			check					check		check							3
Michael Ealy			check				check										2
Regina Hall							check		check								2
Kevin Hart							check	check	check	check						check	5
Taraji P. Henson						check	check		check								3
Laurence Fishburne					check			check									2
Gabrielle Union							check		check								2
Ken Jeong										check		check					2
Jay Pharoah								check					check				2
Gary Owen							check	check	check								3
Bruce McGill								check		check							2
Christopher Lennertz							check	check	check	check	check	check		check	check	check	9
Kevin Mambo	check	check															2
Will Packer							check	check	check	check				check		check	6
Eric Reed	check	check															2
