= What Now? Tour =

Comedy tour by Kevin Hart

- Tour by Kevin Hart
- Start date: April 9, 2015
- End date: August 27, 2016
- Legs: 5
- No. of shows: 143 in North America; 16 in Europe; 7 in Australasia; 3 in Africa; 169 in total
- Attendance: 216,655
- Box office: $16 M

The What Now? Tour was a comedy tour by American comedian Kevin Hart. The tour began in San Antonio at the AT&T Center on April 9, 2015, and concluded on August 7, 2016, in Columbus at the Columbus Civic Center.

== Background and development ==
Billboard's Ray Waddel wrote on March 6, 2015, that the What Now? Tour was on track for the biggest comedy tour of all time. Hart toured a total of 168 shows across North America, Europe, Asia, Oceania, and Africa. Some cities like Buffalo, Orlando, and Jacksonville, Baltimore, Miami, and Tampa, Hart held two shows on the same day.

== Tour dates ==
List of shows, showing date, city, country, venue, tickets sold, number of available tickets and amount of gross revenue
Date	City	Country	Venue	Number of shows
North America
April 9, 2015	San Antonio	United States	AT&T Center	1
April 10, 2015	North Little Rock	United States	Verizon Arena	1
April 11, 2015	Oklahoma City	United States	Chesapeake Energy Arena	1
April 17, 2015	Buffalo	United States	First Niagara Center	2
April 18, 2015	Uncasville	United States	Mohegan Sun Arena	1
April 19, 2015	Nashville	United States	Bridgestone Arena	2
April 20, 2015	Knoxville	United States	Thompson–Boling Arena	1
April 21, 2015	Greensboro	United States	Greensboro Coliseum	1
April 22, 2015	North Charleston	United States	North Charleston Coliseum	1
April 24, 2015	Orlando	United States	Amway Center	2
April 25, 2015	Jacksonville	United States	Jacksonville Arena	2
April 26, 2015	Birmingham	United States	Legacy Arena	1
April 28, 2015	Worcester	United States	DCU Center	1
April 29, 2015	Amherst	United States	William D. Mullins Memorial Center	1
April 30, 2015	Manchester	United States	Verizon Wireless Arena	1
May 1, 2015	Raleigh	United States	PNC Arena	1
May 2, 2015	Charlotte	United States	Time Warner Cable Arena	1
May 3, 2015	Richmond	United States	Richmond Coliseum	1
May 8, 2015	Tampa	United States	Amalie Arena	2
May 9, 2015	Miami	United States	American Airlines Arena	2
May 10, 2015	Miami	United States	American Airlines Arena	1
May 15, 2015	Minneapolis	United States	Target Center	1
May 16, 2015	Auburn Hills	United States	The Palace of Auburn Hills	2
May 17, 2015	Grand Rapids	United States	Van Andel Arena	1
May 23, 2015	Las Vegas	United States	Mandalay Bay Events Center	1
May 24, 2015	Las Vegas	United States	Mandalay Bay Events Center	1
June 5, 2015	Boston	United States	TD Garden	1
June 6, 2015	Baltimore	United States	Royal Farms Arena	2
June 7, 2015	Boston	United States	TD Garden	2
June 12, 2015	Atlanta	United States	Philips Arena	2
June 13, 2015	Atlanta	United States	Philips Arena	1
June 14, 2015	Augusta	United States	James Brown Arena	1
June 19, 2015	Indianapolis	United States	Bankers Life Fieldhouse	1
June 20, 2015	Cincinnati	United States	U.S. Bank Arena	1
June 21, 2015	Cleveland	United States	Quicken Loans Arena	2
June 25, 2015	Los Angeles	United States	Staples Center	1
July 2, 2015	New Orleans	United States	Mercedes-Benz Superdome	1
July 3, 2015	Memphis	United States	FedExForum	1
July 7, 2015	New York City	United States	Madison Square Garden	1
July 8, 2015	New York City	United States	Madison Square Garden	2
July 9, 2015	Brooklyn	United States	Barclays Center	2
July 10, 2015	Bridgeport	United States	Webster Bank Arena	1
July 11, 2015	Newark	United States	Prudential Center	2
July 16, 2015	San Jose	United States	SAP Center	1
July 17, 2015	Sacramento	United States	Sleep Train Arena	2
July 18, 2015	Oakland	United States	Oracle Arena	2
July 24, 2015	Montreal	Canada	Bell Centre	1
July 30, 2015	Chicago	United States	United Center	2
July 31, 2015	Chicago	United States	United Center	1
August 1, 2015	Toronto	Canada	Air Canada Centre	2
August 2, 2015	Toronto	Canada	Air Canada Centre	1
August 6, 2015	Washington, D.C.	United States	Verizon Center	1
August 7, 2015	Washington, D.C.	United States	Verizon Center	1
August 14, 2015	Dallas	United States	American Airlines Center	1
August 15, 2015	Houston	United States	Toyota Center	2
August 16, 2015	Houston	United States	Toyota Center	1
August 20, 2015	Louisville	United States	KFC Yum! Center	1
August 21, 2015	St. Louis	United States	Scottrade Center	1
August 22, 2015	Kansas City	United States	Sprint Center	2
August 26, 2015	Syracuse	United States	Oncenter War Memorial Arena	2
August 27, 2015	Albany	United States	Times Union Center	1
August 28, 2015	Wantagh	United States	Nikon at Jones Beach Theater	1
August 30, 2015 (Note: Kevin Hart: What Now?)	Philadelphia	United States	Lincoln Financial Field	1
September 5, 2015	Las Vegas	United States	The Chelsea	2
September 7, 2015	Denver	United States	Pepsi Center	1
September 8, 2015	West Valley City	United States	Maverik Center	1
September 9, 2015	Spokane	United States	McCarthey Athletic Center	1
September 10, 2015	Vancouver	Canada	Rogers Arena	1
September 11, 2015	Portland	United States	Moda Center	1
September 12, 2015	Seattle	United States	KeyArena	2
September 17, 2015	Anaheim	United States	Honda Center	1
September 18, 2015	Inglewood	United States	The Forum	1
September 19, 2015	San Diego	United States	Viejas Arena	1
October 2, 2015	Columbia	United States	Mizzou Arena	1
October 3, 2015	Iowa City	United States	Carver–Hawkeye Arena	1
October 4, 2015	Ames	United States	Hilton Coliseum	1
October 6, 2015	Madison	United States	Kohl Center	1
October 7, 2015	Green Bay	United States	Resch Center	1
October 8, 2015	Windsor	Canada	The Colosseum at Caesars Windsor	1
October 9, 2015	Lexington	United States	Rupp Arena	1
October 10, 2015	Columbus	United States	Nationwide Arena	1
October 11, 2015	Dayton	United States	Nutter Center	1
October 12, 2015	Port Chester	United States	Capitol Theatre	2
October 13, 2015	Poughkeepsie	United States	Mid-Hudson Civic Center	1
October 14, 2015	Halifax	Canada	Scotiabank Centre	1
October 15, 2015	Halifax	Canada	Scotiabank Centre	1
October 16, 2015	Ottawa	Canada	Canadian Tire Centre	1
October 17, 2015	Providence	United States	Dunkin' Donuts Center	1
October 18, 2015	New Brunswick	United States	State Theatre	2
October 19, 2015	Huntington	United States	Paramount Theatre	2
October 27, 2015	Anchorage	United States	Sullivan Arena	1
October 28, 2015	Fresno	United States	Save Mart Center	1
October 29, 2015	Bakersfield	United States	Rabobank Arena	1
October 30, 2015	Reno	United States	Reno Events Center	1
November 17, 2015	Saskatoon	Canada	SaskTel Centre	1
November 18, 2015	Regina	Canada	Brandt Centre	1
November 19, 2015	Winnipeg	Canada	MTS Centre	1
November 20, 2015	Fargo	United States	Fargodome	1
November 21, 2015	Boise	United States	Taco Bell Arena	1
November 22, 2015	Edmonton	Canada	Rexall Place	1
November 23, 2015	Calgary	Canada	Scotiabank Saddledome	1
November 24, 2015	East Lansing	United States	Breslin Student Events Center	1
December 26, 2015	Hollywood	United States	Hard Rock Live	1
December 27, 2015	Thackerville	United States	WinStar Global Event Center	1
December 29, 2015	Allentown	United States	PPL Center	1
December 30, 2015	Wilkes-Barre	United States	Mohegan Sun Arena at Casey Plaza	1
December 31, 2015	Atlantic City	United States	Boardwalk Hall	1
January 1, 2016	Hershey	United States	Giant Center	1
Europe
January 15, 2016	Birmingham	England	Barclaycard Arena	1
January 16, 2016	Amsterdam	Netherlands	Ziggo Dome	1
January 17, 2016	London	England	The O_{2} Arena	1
January 20, 2016	Manchester	England	Manchester Arena	1
January 22, 2016	Dublin	Ireland	3Arena	2
January 23, 2016	London	England	Wembley Arena	2
January 24, 2016	London	England	The O_{2} Arena	1
January 25, 2016	Oslo	Norway	Oslo Spektrum	2
January 26, 2016	Stockholm	Sweden	Ericsson Globe	2
January 27, 2016	Berlin	Germany	Mercedes-Benz Arena	1
January 28, 2016	Helsinki	Finland	Hartwall Arena	1
January 29, 2016	Malmö	Sweden	Malmö Arena	1
January 30, 2016	Amsterdam	Netherlands	Ziggo Dome	1
January 31, 2016	Antwerp	Belgium	Sportpaleis	1
Australasia
February 2, 2016	Singapore		Suntec Singapore Convention and Exhibition Centre	1
February 3, 2016	Perth	Australia	Perth Arena	1
February 4, 2016	Melbourne	Australia	Rod Laver Arena	1
February 5, 2016	Melbourne	Australia	Rod Laver Arena	1
February 6, 2016	Brisbane	Australia	Brisbane Entertainment Centre	1
February 7, 2016	Sydney	Australia	Allphones Arena	1
February 8, 2016	Sydney	Australia	Allphones Arena	1
Africa
March 26, 2016	Cape Town	South Africa	GrandWest Arena	1
March 28, 2016	Durban	South Africa	Durban ICC Arena	1
March 30, 2016	Johannesburg	South Africa	Ticketpro Dome	1
North America
July 31, 2016	Concord	United States	Concord Pavilion	1
August 1, 2016	Saratoga	United States	Mountain Winery	1
August 2, 2016	Stockton	United States	Stockton Arena	1
August 3, 2016	Paso Robles	United States	Vina Robles Amphitheatre	1
August 4, 2016	Corpus Christi	United States	American Bank Center	1
August 5, 2016	Biloxi	United States	Mississippi Coast Coliseum	1
August 6, 2016	Rogers	United States	Walmart Arkansas Music Pavilion	1
August 7, 2016	Columbus	United States	Columbus Civic Center	1
Total				168

=== Box office score data ===
Venue	City	Tickets sold / available	Gross revenue
Mohegan Sun Arena	Uncasville	7,256 / 7,256 (100%)	$694,364
Bridgestone Arena	Nashville	26,999 / 26,999 (100%)	$1,546,825
Amway Center	Orlando	23,044 / 24,208 (95%)	$1,719,382
Amalie Arena	Tampa	22,853 / 23,707 (96%)	$1,688,822
Staples Center	Los Angeles	14,031 / 15,161 (92%)	$1,418,355
Barclays Center	Brooklyn	25,768 / 25,768 (100%)	$2,186,425
Air Canada Centre	Toronto	40,437 / 40,437 (100%)	$2,692,200
Capitol One Center	Washington, D.C.	26,218 / 26,218 (100%)	$2,350,218
Times Union Center	Albany	10,191 / 10,492 (97%)	$561,854
The Chelsea	Las Vegas	3,719 / 5,020 (74%)	$325,805
Maverik Center	West Valley City	6,633 / 10,078 (65%)	$483,411
Save Mart Center	Fresno	9,506 / 10,647 (89%)	$602,912
Total		216,655 / 225,991 (95%)	$16,270,573

== Feature film ==
A film about the tour, entitled Kevin Hart: What Now?, was released on October 14, 2016.
