= Xenon Pictures =

American film company

- Type: Private
- Industry: Films
- Genre: African-American films
- Founded: 1986
- Headquarters: Santa Monica, California
- Key people: S. Leigh Savidge (President and COO); Stephen A. Housed (EVP/Chief Operating Officer); Kent Little (Chief Financial Officer)

Xenon Pictures is an American film production and distribution company which releases titles produced by African-American filmmakers for African-American audiences. The label has distribution deals with numerous prominent filmmakers, such as Melvin Van Peebles, Rudy Ray Moore, Jamaa Fanaka, Ralph Bakshi and Perry Henzell.

== Company information ==
Xenon was founded by S. Leigh Savidge in 1986 under the name of Xenon Entertainment with $17,000 in startup capital. Xenon has acquired and produced content that includes the work of Melvin Van Peebles (Sweet Sweetback’s Baadasssss Song) and Rudy Ray Moore (Dolemite), definitive biographies on Rosa Parks, Martin Luther King Jr. and Mahalia Jackson, films featuring hip-hop stars like Snoop Dogg, Tupac Shakur and Dr. Dre, and contemporary films from emerging directors such as Tim Story (Barbershop) and Mandel Holland (The Other Brother).

== TelevisaUnivision Mexico home video distribution deal ==
In 2002, Xenon signed a landmark deal with Mexican media powerhouse Televisa (now known as TelevisaUnivision Mexico) to develop and distribute its domestic video brand, Televisa Home Entertainment, in the United States. Working with programming such as classic television series, top-rated telenovelas, documentaries on major Latino stars, and theatrical features, Xenon helped position TelevisaUnivision to be the dominant brand in the Latin/Spanish-language genre.
