= Amazing Stories (2020 TV series) =

2020 American anthology television series

- Promotional poster
- Genre: Anthology; Fantasy; Science-fiction; Drama
- Based on: Amazing Stories by Steven Spielberg
- Theme music composer: John Williams
- Composers: Nicholas Pike; Ramin Djawadi; Brandon Campbell; Noah Sorota; Harry Gregson-Williams; Mark Isham
- Country of origin: United States
- Original language: English
- No. of seasons: 1
- No. of episodes: 5

Production
- Executive producers: Edward Kitsis; Adam Horowitz; Steven Spielberg; Darryl Frank; Justin Falvey
- Editors: Sabrina Plisco; Geofrey Hildrew; Nona Khodai
- Running time: 47–53 minutes
- Production companies: Universal Television; Amblin Television; Kitsis/Horowitz; ABC Studios

Original release
- Network: Apple TV+
- Release: March 6 – April 3, 2020

Related
- Amazing Stories (original series)

Amazing Stories is an American anthology television series based on the original 1985 television series of the same name, created by Steven Spielberg. The series was produced for Apple TV+ and its executive producers for the series included Spielberg, Edward Kitsis, Adam Horowitz, Darryl Frank, and Justin Falvey. Episodes premiered between March 6 and April 3, 2020.

Like the previous series, the name Amazing Stories is taken from the first science fiction magazine, which was launched in 1926 and has continued in various formats for decades.

== Episodes ==
| No. | Title | Directed by | Written by | Original release date |
|---|---|---|---|---|
| 1 | "The Cellar" | Chris Long | Jessica Sharzer | March 6, 2020 |
An accidental time-traveler has a romance with a woman a hundred years in the past. Cast: Dylan O'Brien, Victoria Pedretti, Micah Stock, Sasha Alexander
| 2 | "The Heat" | Sylvain White | Chinaka Hodge | March 13, 2020 |
After a hit-and-run collision, the ghost of a track athlete investigates her death and helps her best friend train for a college track scholarship. Cast: Hailey Kilgore, E'myri Crutchfield, Shane Paul McGhie, Ezana Alem
| 3 | "Dynoman and the Volt!" | Susanna Fogel | Peter Ackerman | March 20, 2020 |
A grandfather receives a superhero ring that he ordered in the mail 60 years ago, enabling him to become a hero to his comic-obsessed grandson. Cast: Robert Forster, Tyler Crumley, Kyle Bornheimer Note: This episode was dedicated in memory of Robert Forster who died in October 2019 after this episode was filmed.
| 4 | "Signs of Life" | Michael Dinner | Leah Fong | March 27, 2020 |
Sara awakens from a six-year coma with memory loss and other strange behaviors. Her adult daughter Alia, who struggles after dropping out of school, discovers that Sara is linked to other similar cases. Cast: Michelle Wilson, Sasha Lane, Josh Holloway
| 5 | "The Rift" | Mark Mylod | Don Handfield and Richard Rayner | April 3, 2020 |
A World War II fighter plane crashes outside of Dayton, Ohio. Passerby Mary Ann rescues the pilot, Lt. Theodore Cole, and learns that he had been shot down over Burma. Mary Ann and her stepson Elijah (Duncan Joiner) protect Cole as he is pursued by federal agents who believe that his presence is a bad omen. Cast: Kerry Bishé, Austin Stowell, Edward Burns, Juliana Canfield Note: This episode was adapted from the 2017 graphic novel of the same name.

== Production ==
=== Development ===
On October 23, 2015, it was announced that NBC was developing a reboot of the 1985 anthology television series Amazing Stories created by Steven Spielberg. Bryan Fuller was expected to write the pilot episode and executive produce alongside Justin Falvey and Darryl Frank. Production companies involved with the series were slated to consist of Universal Television. At that time, Spielberg was not expected to be involved with the series.

On October 10, 2017, it was announced that Apple Inc. had given the production a ten-episode series order. It was further announced that Amblin Television would serve as an additional production company for the series.

On February 7, 2018, it was reported that Fuller had stepped down as showrunner of the series over creative differences. It was unclear as to whether Fuller would have a different role in the production going forward but it was clarified that he had not delivered a script to Apple before his departure. Later that day, it was also reported that executive producer Hart Hanson was exiting the series as well. On May 22, 2018, it was announced that Once Upon a Time creators Edward Kitsis and Adam Horowitz had joined the production as executive producers and showrunners. On December 4, 2018, it was reported that Mark Mylod would direct an episode of the series executive produced by Edward Burns.

=== Casting ===
On December 4, 2018, it was announced that Edward Burns, Austin Stowell, and Kerry Bishé would guest star together in an episode. On October 11, 2019, it was announced that Robert Forster would appear on the show and would be his final role after his death in the episode "Dynaman and the Volt." On January 19, 2020, it was announced that Dylan O'Brien, Victoria Pedretti, Josh Holloway, and Sasha Alexander would also appear on the show.

=== Filming ===
Principal photography for the series began in November 2018 in Georgia, US. Filming took place in various locations around the state that month including Alto, Forsyth, Griffin, Dobbins Air Reserve Base, and Downtown Atlanta. In December 2018, the production was shooting in areas such as Sandy Springs, Smyrna, Kirkwood, and Flowery Branch. In January 2019, the series was working out of locations in Atlanta including the Starlight Drive-In Theatre, Emory University's Briarcliff campus and the Centennial Olympic Park.

== Reception ==
On Rotten Tomatoes, the series' single season has an approval rating of 41% based on 34 reviews, with an average rating of 4.6/10. The website's critics consensus states, "While Amazing Stories' aspirations are admirable, it feels more like a dated retread than a heartfelt reboot." On Metacritic, it has a weighted average score of 51 out of 100, based on 14 critics, indicating "mixed or average reviews".

Amazing Stories was nominated for a 2021 Saturn Award for Best Television Presentation (under 10 episodes).

== See also ==
- List of Apple TV+ original programming
