= Kevin Mambo =

Zimbabwean-Canadian actor and musician

- Born: June 29, 1972 (age 53); Harare, Zimbabwe
- Occupations: Actor, musician
- Years active: 1992–present
- Known for: Playing Fela Anikulapo-Kuti in the Broadway musical Fela!
- Awards: Daytime Emmy Award for Outstanding Younger Actor in a Drama Series (1996, 1997)

Kevin Mambo (born June 29, 1972) is a Zimbabwean-Canadian actor and musician.

He is best known for his role on the CBS Daytime serial Guiding Light in the role of Marcus Williams, which won him two Daytime Emmys and for his role as Fela Anikulapo-Kuti in the Broadway production of the musical Fela!

== Early life ==
Kevin Mambo was born in Harare, Zimbabwe, and raised in Saskatoon, Saskatchewan, Canada. An avid musician, he was in the church choir as a child and started playing piano at age 8, saxophone at age 10, and the guitar at age 19. He attended Aden Bowman Collegiate in Saskatoon and then Brentwood College School in Mill Bay, British Columbia. He studied Political Science and African History at McGill University in Montreal, Quebec where he also took classes at the McGill Jazz Conservatory. Kevin then transferred to the University of Southern California where he earned his Bachelor of Fine Arts degree.

== Career ==
In 2015, Mambo appeared in the Billie Holiday Theatre production of Jackie Alexander's Brothers from the Bottom opposite Wendell Pierce. In 2014, Mambo starred as Barret Rude Jr. in the musical The Fortress of Solitude which premiered at the Dallas Theater Center and at The Public Theater in New York. The musical is based on Jonathan Lethem's, The Fortress of Solitude. Mambo has also appeared in The Book of Mormon as Mafala during the first National Tour (2012–2013) and as Chancellor in Danai Gurira's The Convert (directed by Emily Mann) in 2011–2012. He played Fela Anikulapo-Kuti in the Broadway production of the musical Fela! at the Eugene O'Neill Theatre., and appeared off-Broadway in Lynn Nottage's Pulitzer Prize-winning play, Ruined at the Manhattan Theatre Club and at the Goodman Theatre in Chicago, Hoodoo Love at the Cherry Lane Theatre, Once Around the Sun at the Zipper Factory Theater, and Fela Is a Weapon at the Shrine Theater. Film and television credits include Cadillac Records, Nina, Mistresses; Guiding Light (two-time Daytime Emmy Award for Outstanding Younger Actor in a Drama Series), One Life to Live, Soul Food, Any Day Now, Law & Order, Law & Order: Criminal Intent, Deadline, Law & Order: Trial by Jury, Law & Order: Special Victims Unit, Spin City, Family Matters, Freshman Dorm, The Firing Squad, and One of Us Tripped.

== Filmography ==
=== Film ===
- One of Us Tripped (1997) - Thomas
- The Firing Squad (1999) - Kane
- Cadillac Records (2008) - Jimmy Rogers
- Nina (2016) - Gilles
- Rustin (2023) - Whitney Young

=== Television ===
- Freshman Dorm (1992) - Alex Woods
- Family Matters (1993) - Derek
- Guiding Light (1995–1998) - Marcus Williams
- One Life to Live (2003–2004) - Jordan Kingsley
- Luke Cage (2018) - Sheldon Shaw
- Hit & Run (2021) - Detective Newkirk

=== Videogames ===
- Grand Theft Auto: San Andreas (2004) - Pedestrian
- Law & Order: Criminal Intent (2005) - Detective McMillan
