= 2 Minutes of Fame =

2020 American film by Leslie Small

- Film poster
- Directed by: Leslie Small
- Written by: Devon Shepard; Yamara Taylor
- Produced by: Jeff Clanagan; Paul Hall
- Starring: Jay Pharoah; Katt Williams
- Music by: Kurt Farquhar
- Production company: Codeblack Films
- Distributed by: Lionsgate
- Release date: June 16, 2020
- Running time: 97 minutes
- Country: United States
- Language: English

2 Minutes of Fame is a 2020 American comedy film directed by Leslie Small and starring Jay Pharoah and Katt Williams.

== Plot ==
2 Minutes of Fame is about an aspiring stand-up comedian who becomes a viral online sensation. He moves to Los Angeles hoping to become a film star and have a movie career. He has a wife who watches him follow his dream while taking care of his house and children.

== Cast ==
- Jay Pharoah as Deandre
- Katt Williams as Marques
- Keke Palmer as Sky
- RonReaco Lee as Eddie
- Deon Cole as Nico
- Carmela Zumbado as Reporter

== Reception ==
According to CultureMix, the movie, "has an endearing sweetness at the core of its raunchy humor. It works best when it focuses on the competitive world of stand-up comedy rather than the relationship/family problems of the protagonist."
