= Kevin Hart: Laugh at My Pain =

- Directed by: Leslie Small; Tim Story
- Written by: Kevin Hart; Na'im Lynn; Joey Wells
- Produced by: Jeff Atlas, Valarie Benning Barney; Jeff Clanagan
- Starring: Kevin Hart
- Cinematography: Ken Glassing
- Edited by: George Artope; Spencer Averick; A.J. Dickerson
- Music by: Dylan Berry
- Production companies: Codeblack Entertainment; Comedy Central Films; Hartbeat Productions; Usual Suspects Productions
- Distributed by: AMC Theatres
- Release date: September 9, 2011
- Running time: 89 minutes
- Country: United States
- Language: English
- Budget: $750,000
- Box office: $7.7 million

Kevin Hart: Laugh at My Pain is a 2011 stand-up comedy documentary film, starring comedian Kevin Hart. It features Hart performing a stand-up special at the Nokia Theater at L.A. Live in Downtown Los Angeles, among other material. Taraji P. Henson and RuPaul appear, among others.

== Reception ==
On the review aggregator website Rotten Tomatoes, 67% of 6 critics' reviews are positive.
