= Kevin Hart: Let Me Explain =

- Theatrical release poster
- Directed by: Leslie Small; Tim Story
- Produced by: Jeff Clanagan; Blake W. Morrison
- Starring: Kevin Hart
- Cinematography: Larry Blanford
- Edited by: Spencer Averick
- Music by: Kennard Ramsey
- Production company: Hartbeat Productions
- Distributed by: Lionsgate (under Summit Entertainment and Codeblack Films)
- Release dates: June 22, 2013 (American Black Film Festival); July 3, 2013 (United States)
- Running time: 75 minutes
- Country: United States
- Language: English
- Budget: $2.5 million
- Box office: $32.3 million

Kevin Hart: Let Me Explain is a 2013 American stand-up comedy concert film featuring Kevin Hart's 2012 performance at Madison Square Garden. It was released in theaters on July 3, 2013. The film was directed by Leslie Small and Tim Story, produced by Hartbeat Productions, and distributed by Summit Entertainment and Codeblack Films.

== Plot ==
Kevin is throwing a celebration party, but guests tell him that he has changed since his divorce. He tries to explain himself, but they will not let him, so he decides to do a show at Madison Square Garden letting him explain, which sold out with 30,000 people. The film also shows performances of his sold-out shows from all around the world.

== Reception ==
=== Critical response ===
Kevin Hart: Let Me Explain received positive reviews, with many critics praising Hart's stand-up outlook and comparing the film to Eddie Murphy Raw. Rotten Tomatoes gives the film a score of 63%, based on reviews from 43 critics with an average rating of 6.03/10. The site's consensus is: "It's ironically rather short on standup from Mr. Hart himself, but structural problems aside, Kevin Hart: Let Me Explain offers another example of why he's achieved mainstream success on his own terms."

== Home media ==
Kevin Hart: Let Me Explain was released on DVD and Blu-ray on October 15, 2013, which was also the date of the second-season premiere of Real Husbands of Hollywood, a comedy-improv reality television parody on BET created by Hart.

== Soundtrack ==
The soundtrack was released on November 12, 2013. Erick Sermon, Snoop Dogg, Method Man, Lisette Love, American Antagon1st, Nipsey Hussle, and, in a featured role, RL, performed a song, "Let Me Explain", based on the film. The music video is available on the HartBeat Production's YouTube channel and iTunes.

The soundtrack also included songs from Krayzie Bone, Masspike Miles, Dorrough, and Rocko.

== See also ==
- List of black films of the 2010s
