= Leslie Small =

American film director and producer (born 1968/69)

- Born: 1968/1969; Los Angeles, California, U.S.
- Occupations: Film director; film producer
- Years active: 1998–present

Leslie Small (born 1968/1969) is an American film director and producer.

== Career ==
Leslie Small began his career in 1998 shooting a commercial for Master P's No Limit Films. While working with Mo'Nique to prepare her one-woman show Mo'Nique: One Night Stand (2005), the producer also discussed producing a female comedy in the world of hair, which ended up being Small's theatrical directorial debut film Hair Show (2004). Since then he has filmed numerous films and television specials, including Kevin Hart: Laugh at My Pain (2011), Kevin Hart: Let Me Explain (2013), Kevin Hart: What Now? (2016), and Kevin Hart: Irresponsible (2019).

== Personal life ==
Small is from the city of Los Angeles. He has a Bachelor of Science degree in Psychology, a master's degree in Statistics, and a PhD in Economics.

== Filmography ==
- Charlie Hustle: Blueprint of a Self-Made Millionaire (1999)
- Tara (2001)
- Cedric the Entertainer: Starting Lineup (2002)
- Bruce Bruce Live (2003)
- The Torry Brothers: A Family Affair (2004)
- Hair Show (2004)
- Black Leather Soles (2005)
- Earthquake: About Got Damm Time (2005)
- Tell Hell I Ain’t Comin’ (2005)
- Bill Bellamy: Back to My Roots (2005)
- Love on Layaway (2005)
- Mo'Nique: One Night Stand (2005)
- Steve Harvey: Don't Trip… He Ain't Through with Me Yet (2006)
- Mike Epps: Inappropriate Behavior (2006)
- Steve Harvey: Still Trippin' (2008)
- Eddie Griffin: Freedom of Speech (2008)
- A Good Man Is Hard to Find (2008)
- All Star Comedy Jam (2009)
- All Star Comedy Jam: Live from South Beach (2009)
- Shaquille O'Neal Presents: All-Star Comedy Jam – Live from Dallas (2010)
- Mike Epps Presents: Live from Club Nokia (2011)
- Aries Spears: Hollywood, Look I'm Smiling (2011)
- DeRay Davis: Power Play (2011)
- Kevin Hart: Laugh at My Pain (2011)
- Gary Owen: True Story (2012)
- Corey Holcomb: Your Way Ain't Working (2012)
- Shaquille O'Neal Presents: All Star Comedy Jam – Live from Orlando (2012)
- Kevin Hart: Let Me Explain (2013)
- Shaquille O'Neal Presents: All Star Comedy Jam – Live from Atlanta (2013)
- One Christmas (2013)
- Shaquille O'Neal Presents: All Star Comedy Jam – Live from Las Vegas (2014)
- Kevin Hart Presents: Keith Robinson – Back of the Bus Funny (2014)
- Gary Owen: I Agree with Myself (2015)
- Comedy Dynamics: Uncontrolled Comedy (2015)
- Kevin Hart: What Now? (2016)
- Shaquille O'Neal Presents: All Star Comedy Jam: Live from Sin City (2016)
- Mo Funny, Mo Laughs (2018)
- Katt Williams: Great America (2018)
- Kevin Hart: Irresponsible (2019)
- Undercover Brother 2 (2019)
- Holiday Rush (2019)
- 2 Minutes of Fame (2020)
- Kevin Hart: Zero F**ks Given (2020)
- Olympic Highlights with Kevin Hart and Snoop Dogg (2021 TV series)
- For the Love of Money (2021)
- Real Husbands of Hollywood: More Kevin More Problems (2022 TV series, directed 2 episodes)
- Kevin Hart's Winter Olympics Tailgate Party (2022)
- 2022: Back That Year Up (2022)
- Kevin Hart: Reality Check (2023)
- 2023: Back That Year Up (2023)
- Olympic Highlights with Kevin Hart and Kenan Thompson (2024 TV series)
- 2024: Back That Year Up (2024)
- Kevin Hart: Acting My Age (2025)
- Janet Jackson: Control 40 (TBA)
