= Damon Wilson =

American foreign policy expert (born 1973)

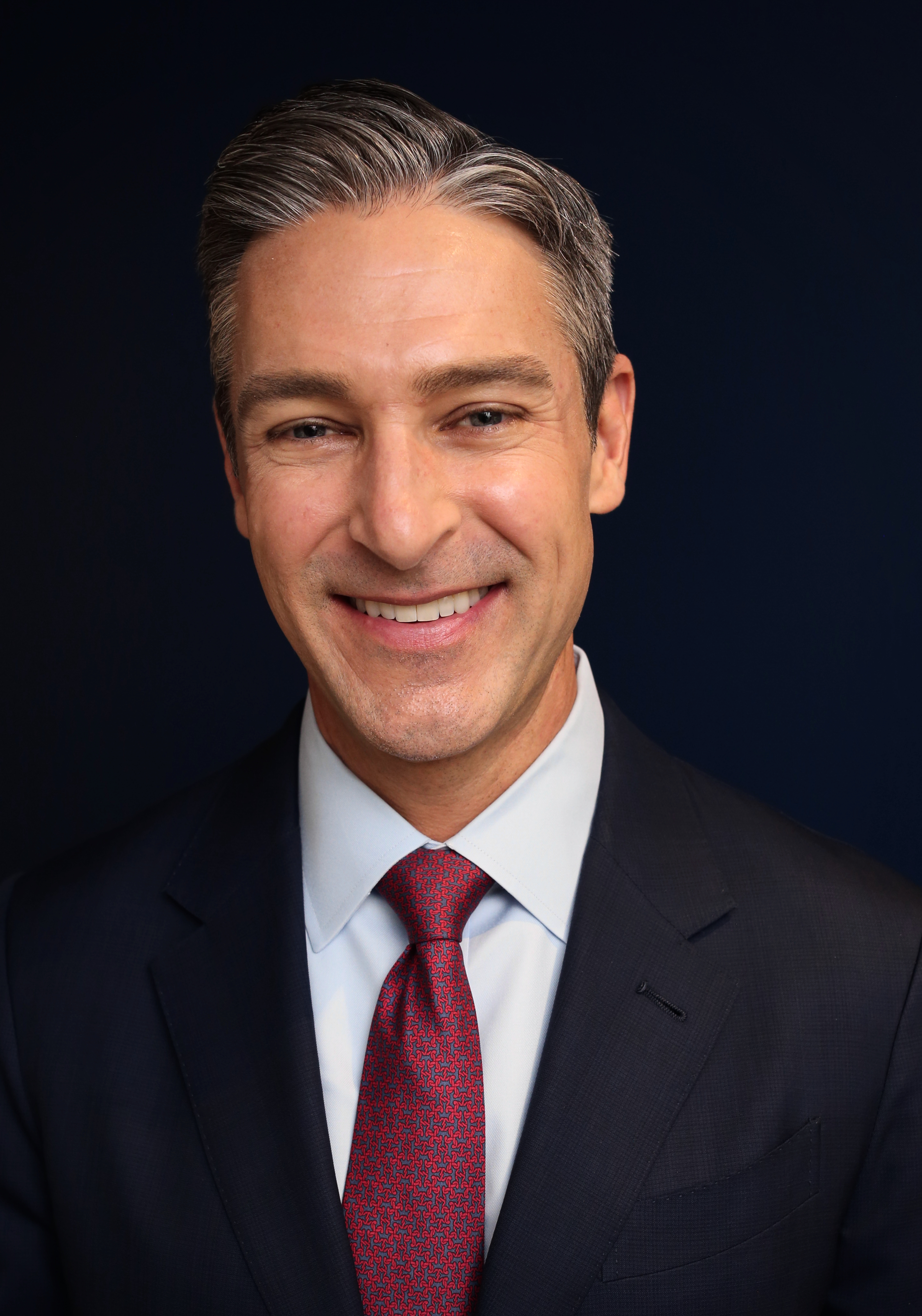

President and CEO of the National Endowment for Democracy
- Incumbent
- Assumed office July 2021
- Preceded by: Carl Gershman

Personal details
- Born: May 24, 1973 (age 53) Nashville, Tennessee, U.S.
- Education: Duke University (BA); Princeton University (MPA)

Damon M. Wilson (born May 24, 1973) is an American foreign policy scholar who serves as president and CEO of the National Endowment for Democracy, a foundation supporting freedom and democracy around the world. From 2011 to 2021, he was the Executive Vice President at the Atlantic Council, a nonpartisan think tank focused on international cooperation. A former civil servant, Wilson served as Special Assistant to the President and Senior Director for European Affairs at the National Security Council during the second term of President George W. Bush.

Focusing on international relations, national security, and democracy support, Wilson often testifies before the United States Congress and is a frequent media contributor.

== Early life and education ==
Wilson was born in Nashville, Tennessee and raised in Charleston, South Carolina. He attended Duke University as a Benjamin N. Duke Scholar and graduated with a Bachelor of Arts in political science in 1995. While at Duke, he lived in Estonia during its first year of regained independence, interned for US Senator Ernest Hollings of South Carolina, and worked for the Unaccompanied Children in Exile Project in Croatia. Following graduation, Wilson was awarded the inaugural Hart Leadership Fellowship, working as a project officer in Rwanda with Save the Children from 1995 to 1996. During the fellowship, Wilson supported programming to assist children who lost or were separated from their parents in the wake of the Rwandan genocide.

Wilson completed a Master of Public Administration at Princeton University's Woodrow Wilson School of Public and International Affairs in 1998. During his studies, he interned in the African Affairs Directorate of the National Security Council led by Susan Rice. After graduation, Wilson was selected as a Presidential Management Fellow and assigned to the State Department’s NATO office, working for Ron Asmus, under the tenure of Secretary Madeleine Albright; his fellowship included tours on the China desk and to the U.S. Embassy in Beijing from 1998 to 2001.

== Career ==
For over twenty years, Wilson has helped shape U.S. strategy and national security policy in regards to NATO and US-European relations to advance freedom and security around the world. He is an advocate for strengthening democratic alliances to address security challenges, believing “US interests are best served when Washington and its allies act in unison.” Wilson views authoritarian Russia and China as “the main geopolitical challenge of the 21st century,” and that “there is no possible successful strategy to confront Putin’s aggression without a strong NATO.”

From July 2001 to January 2004, Wilson served as deputy director of the Office of the NATO Secretary General, assisting Lord Robertson to transform the Alliance by enlarging NATO membership, implementing the International Security Assistance Force in Afghanistan, and adapting Allied capabilities to face modern threats. In this role, Wilson also supported NATO efforts to broker the Ohrid Agreement to avert civil war in Macedonia.

From January 2004 to November 2006, as Director for Central, Eastern and Northern European Affairs at the National Security Council, Wilson coordinated U.S. interagency policy on Ukraine during the Orange Revolution, directed efforts to deepen engagement in Central and Eastern Europe, including the expansion of secure visa-free travel, and promoted close consultation with coalition partners in Iraq and Afghanistan. He also played a leading role in implementing the Belarus Democracy Act. In 2007, Wilson served as the executive secretary and chief of staff at the U.S. Embassy in Baghdad, where he helped to manage the largest embassy in the world and implement a ‘civilian surge’ throughout Iraq. From December 2007 to January 2009, as Senior Director for European Affairs at the National Security Council, Wilson led U.S. government efforts to advance a Europe whole, free and at peace. He notably managed interagency policy on NATO, the European Union, Georgia, Ukraine, the Balkans, Eurasian energy security and Turkey, and helped plan numerous presidential visits to Europe, including the Bucharest NATO Summit and the 2008 US-EU Summit.

From 2009 to 2011, Wilson directed the International Security program at the Atlantic Council think tank, transforming it into the Scowcroft Center for Strategy and Security. In 2011, he was promoted to the role of Executive Vice President. At the Atlantic Council, Wilson championed American leadership, a strong NATO, continued NATO enlargement, support for democratic reforms in Ukraine and the Balkans, positioning US and NATO forces in the Baltic states, and efforts to counter authoritarian powers Russia and China. During his tenure, he helped launch the Millennium Leadership Program, the Rafik Hariri Center for the Middle East, the Europe Center, and the Balkans Forward Initiative.

In June 2021, Wilson was named as the President and chief executive officer of the National Endowment for Democracy, succeeding Carl Gershman. During his first few months, he managed the safe passage of 923 Afghan grantees, staff and their family members during the 2021 evacuation from Afghanistan following the withdrawal of U.S. troops. In December 2021, alongside USAID Administrator Samantha Power, Wilson moderated a session on human rights and press freedom during the Summit for Democracy.

== Awards and affiliations ==
Wilson has been decorated by the presidents and governments of Bulgaria, Estonia, Georgia, Hungary, Latvia, Moldova, and the Slovak Republic for his efforts to advance transatlantic relations. In 2006, he was presented with the Order of Merit of the Republic of Hungary. In 2007, Estonian President Toomas Ilves awarded Wilson with the Order of the Cross of Terra Mariana. In 2017, Wilson was presented with the Order of the Golden Fleece by Georgian President Giorgi Margvelashvili. In 2018, Wilson received the Czech and Slovak Transatlantic Award by GLOBSEC. In 2021, Wilson was awarded an Order of Merit by the Estonia Ministry of Foreign Affairs.

Wilson currently serves on the board of the Truman Center for National Policy, is a Trustee of the Belarus Free Theatre, and is a member of the Ohrid Group and the International Advisory Council at GLOBSEC.

== Personal life ==
Wilson lives in Washington, D.C. and part-time in Charleston, SC.
