= Kevin Hart =

American comedian and actor (born 1979)

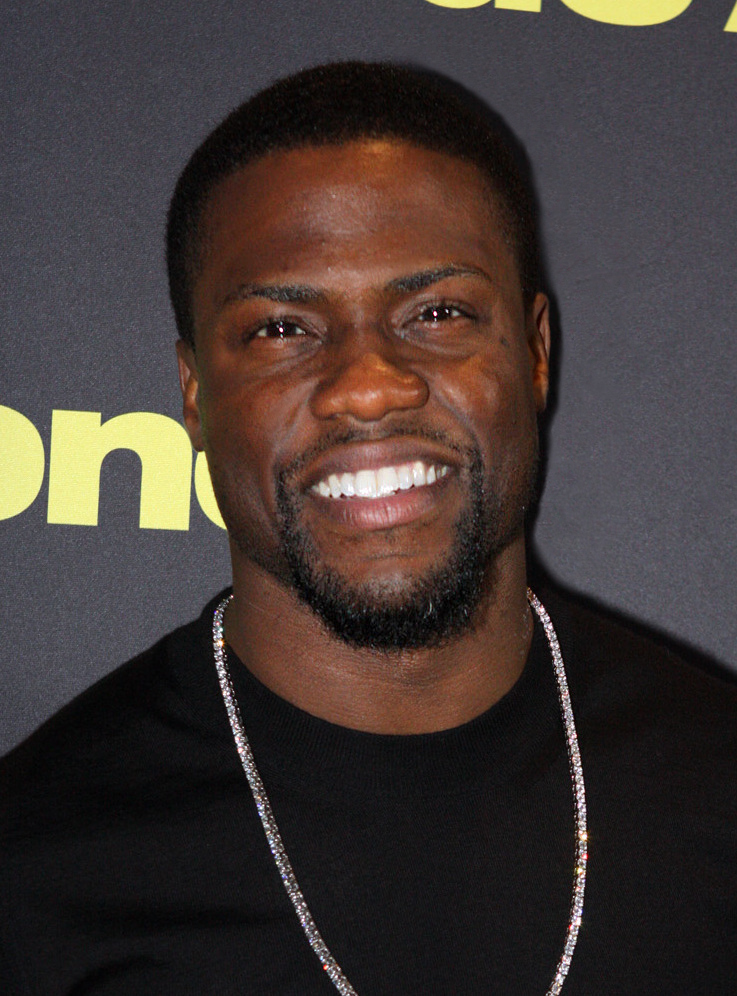
- Hart in 2014
- Born: Kevin Darnell Hart; July 6, 1979 (age 47); Philadelphia, Pennsylvania, U.S.
- Spouses: Torrei Skipper (m. 2003; div. 2011) Eniko Parrish (m. 2016)
- Children: 4

Comedy career
- Years active: 2001–present
- Medium: Stand-up; film; television
- Genres: Observational comedy; black comedy; surreal humor; insult comedy; racial humor; sarcasm; satire
- Subjects: African-American culture; everyday life; human sexuality; marriage; parenting; pop culture; race relations; racism; self-deprecation
- Website: kevinhartnation.com

Kevin Darnell Hart (born July 6, 1979) is an American comedian and actor. After winning several stand-up comedy competitions, Hart had his first breakthrough when Judd Apatow cast him in a recurring role on the TV series Undeclared (2001). Hart's comedic reputation continued to grow with the release of his first stand-up album I'm a Grown Little Man (2009). He has since released four more comedy albums: Seriously Funny (2010), Laugh at My Pain (2011), Let Me Explain (2013), and What Now? (2016).

As an actor, Hart has had roles in films such as Paper Soldiers (2002), Scary Movie 3 (2003), Soul Plane (2004), In the Mix (2005), Little Fockers (2010), Think Like a Man (2012), Grudge Match (2013), Ride Along (2014), About Last Night (2014), Get Hard (2015), Central Intelligence (2016), The Secret Life of Pets film franchise (2016–2019), Ride Along 2 (2016), Captain Underpants: The First Epic Movie (2017), the Jumanji film franchise (2017–present), and Night School (2018). He also created and starred as a fictionalized version of himself in Real Husbands of Hollywood (2013–2016). In 2017, he launched the Laugh Out Loud Network, a subscription video streaming service in partnership with Lionsgate.

Hart has received numerous accolades including the Mark Twain Prize for American Humor in 2024, and nominations for two Grammy Awards and four Primetime Emmy Awards. In 2015, Time magazine named him on its annual list of the 100 most influential people in the world.

== Early life ==
Kevin Darnell Hart was born in Philadelphia on July 6, 1979, to Nancy Hart (died 2007) and Henry Robert Witherspoon (died 2022). He has an older brother named Robert. He was raised in a single-parent household by his mother, who worked as a systems analyst for the Office of Student Registration and Financial Services at the University of Pennsylvania. His father was a cocaine addict who was in and out of jail throughout most of Hart's childhood, prompting Hart to use humor as a way to cope with his troubled family life. His relationship with his father improved after his father recovered from his addiction. He would also later talk about his mother in his stand-up routine, portraying her as a loving yet intimidating woman.

As a teenager, Hart had aspirations of becoming a basketball player. He was a participant at the La Salle basketball camp with future National Basketball Association hall of famer Kobe Bryant and future political commentator and activist Marc Lamont Hill.

After graduating from George Washington High School, Hart briefly attended the Community College of Philadelphia before dropping out and moving to New York City. He spent some time working as a shoe salesman.

== Career ==
=== Stand-up ===
Hart's first stand-up performance took place at The Laff House in his native Philadelphia under the name of Lil Kev, which did not go well. His career suffered a slow start and he was booed offstage several times, once even having a piece of chicken thrown at him. After those initial unsuccessful shows, he began entering comedy competitions throughout Massachusetts, with audience receptions eventually improving. It took time for Hart to develop a unique comedic style. After an early period of attempting to imitate comedians like Chris Tucker, he found his own rhythm by delving into his insecurities and life experiences. He said: "Because of what I do, it has to be an open book. But right now, this is a book that is being written."

Hart's comedy tours began in 2009 with his act titled I'm a Grown Little Man, followed by Seriously Funny in 2010, Laugh at My Pain in 2011, and Let Me Explain in 2013, the last two of which were also released as features in theaters. Hart grossed over $15 million from "Laugh at My Pain", making it one of the year's top-selling comedy tours. Hart also has a game app available through iTunes called "Little Jumpman". His Facebook page, Twitter account, and YouTube channel are all connected to and accessible through this app. Most overseas fans of Hart discovered him on YouTube, as well.

On April 9, 2015, Hart embarked on a comedy world tour titled the What Now? Tour at the AT&T Center in San Antonio, which concluded on August 7, 2016, at the Columbus Civic Center in Columbus, Georgia. On July 16, 2015, Universal Pictures announced that Kevin Hart: What Now?, a stand-up comedy film featuring a performance of Hart's What Now? Tour, would be theatrically released in the United States on October 14, 2016. The show was filmed live on August 30, 2015, in front of 53,000 people, at Philadelphia's Lincoln Financial Field.

In 2025, Hart performed as a headliner in Saudi Arabia's Riyadh Comedy Festival, an event taking place from September 26 to October 9. The comedy festival overlaps with the seventh anniversary of the assassination of Jamal Khashoggi, prompting Joey Shea, Saudi Arabia researcher at Human Rights Watch, to say in a statement that the Saudi government is using the comedy festival to whitewash its human rights abuses. Hart has performed in the region before, the first time taking place in January 2023.

=== Film and television roles ===
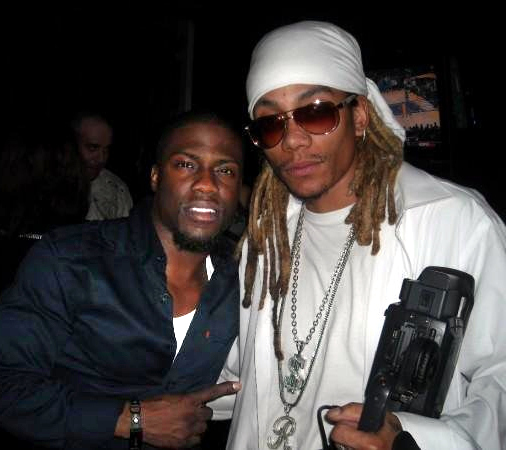
Hart and Charles M. Robinson in October 2009

Hart had a guest appearance in the 2002 sitcom, Undeclared. He made his film debut in the 2002 film Paper Soldiers. Hart then had other film roles such as the Scary Movie franchise, Soul Plane, The 40-Year-Old Virgin, Death at a Funeral and Little Fockers. He turned down a role in the 2008 film Tropic Thunder because the character is gay, citing his own "insecurities".

He played Doug in the film The Five-Year Engagement (2012) and appeared in Think Like a Man which was a box office success. He also appeared in the sequel. He had a cameo as himself in This Is the End. In 2013, Hart played a boxing promoter in Grudge Match and appeared in Exit Strategy as Mannequin Head Man. He also appeared in 35 and Ticking. In 2013, Hart co-created Real Husbands of Hollywood with Chris Spencer. The show follows Hart along with other married celebrities (each playing a comical fictionalized version of themselves) within the series including: Boris Kodjoe, Nelly, Duane Martin, J. B. Smoove, Nick Cannon and Robin Thicke. Thicke did not return for the second season due to his music career, though Hart has stated that the door is open for him to return. The series is filmed in a style similar to Bravo's The Real Housewives. Episodes often hinge on the "real" Hart's desperately unsuccessful attempts to climb Hollywood's celebrity social ladder (which always backfire in humiliating ways), and the character's barely-hidden envy of his more successful celebrity friends. A sneak peek was shown as a segment during the 2012 BET Awards and the official promo was released in October 2012.

In 2014, Hart starred as Ben in Ride Along, opposite Ice Cube. The film received generally negative reviews from critics, but was a major box office success. Hart returned in the sequel, Ride Along 2, which was released in 2016. In 2015, Hart starred in the films Get Hard with Will Ferrell and The Wedding Ringer. In 2016, he starred in Central Intelligence with Dwayne Johnson and the animated The Secret Life of Pets. In 2017, he starred in Captain Underpants: The First Epic Movie (in a voice role), and Jumanji: Welcome to the Jungle with Jack Black, Karen Gillan, and reteaming again with Johnson. He earned an estimated $32.5 million in 2017. In 2018, he produced his first film under his production company HartBeat Productions, Night School. In October 2018, his production company announced that he signed a first-look deal with Nickelodeon. Under the deal, Hart and his HartBeat Productions banner will develop and produce live-action, scripted kids content for the network. Hart also has a first-look film deal with Universal Studios. In 2019, Hart's film The Upside, his first headlining role in a drama, was theatrically released. It also starred Bryan Cranston and Nicole Kidman. Hart also reprised his role of Snowball in the sequel The Secret Life of Pets 2, and Franklin Finbar in Jumanji: The Next Level. In 2021, Hart starred in Fatherhood, a drama about a man whose wife dies shortly after childbirth, leaving him to raise their daughter on his own. It premiered on Netflix on June 18, 2021.

In July 2020, his series Die Hart premiered on Quibi on July 20 and had a strong first weekend. In March 2023, Roku and Hart's multi-platform comedy brand Laugh Out Loud debuted the series' second season on The Roku Channel. In addition to returning to his starring role, Hart executive produced the second season; Laugh Out Loud CEO and Hart's longtime business partner, Jeff Clanagan, served as a producer on the project. Hart signed a first look deal with Netflix in January 2021. He later played Arnold Drummond in the Diff'rent Strokes portion of the third edition of Live in Front of a Studio Audience. In 2022, Hart starred alongside Mark Wahlberg in the comedy film, Me Time. The film shows how Sonny (Hart) experiences a wild journey with his friend after finding a much-longed-for free weekend. In January 2024, Hart starred (alongside Úrsula Corberó from Money Heist and Vincent D'Onofrio) as a master thief in the Netflix comedy heist film Lift, directed by F. Gary Gray. A month later, he competed in season eleven of The Masked Singer as "Book". He purposely unmasked himself in the season eleven premiere as part of a prank on host Nick Cannon.

==== Upcoming projects ====
In 2019, Hart signed on to star in and produce Monopoly. As of June 2023, Monopoly was still in development.

=== Laugh Out Loud Productions ===
In 2017, Hart founded Laugh Out Loud (LOL), a global media and production company to provide opportunities for top comedic talent of all ethnicities worldwide. Originally partnered with Lionsgate, Hart became majority owner in 2019 after buying out most of Lionsgate's stake. LOL spans the full range of media channels, including digital, audio, linear and experiential, with four divisions: LOL Network, LOL Studios, LOL Audio and LOL X!

Hart has aggressively expanded LOL's reach since its founding, securing partnership deals with PlutoTV, Roku, Snap, Facebook, Peacock, and YouTube. In 2020, he extended his company's agreement with SiriusXM. LOL has won numerous accolades, including nominations and awards from the Producers Guild of America, Critics' Choice Movie Awards, Realscreen, Streamy, and Webby.

Known for content such as Cold As Balls, What the Fit, Die Hart, and more, LOL has amassed more than 1 billion video views across its digital platforms, and has worked with brand partners such as AT&T, Headspace, Lyft, Old Spice, P&G, and Viacom.

LOL and production company Hartbeat Productions merged in April 2022, creating Hartbeat, which includes Hartbeat Studios, Hartbeat Media and Hartbeat Pulse.

=== Hosting ===
In addition to acting, Hart has also hosted various ceremonies. Hart first hosted the 2011 BET Awards. Hart then hosted the 2012 MTV Video Music Awards, after his longtime friend Judd Apatow, the director who gave him his first big on-screen break in the TV series Undeclared, recommended him for the position. Hart hoped this would project him into a side career as an emcee, stating: "Hopefully after MTV, of course we're talking Emmys, Oscars, whatever." From 2013 to 2015, he hosted three episodes of Saturday Night Live. In 2015, Hart hosted the Comedy Central Roast of Justin Bieber. In 2016, Hart co-hosted the 2016 MTV Movie Awards with Dwayne Johnson.

In September 2018 Hart hosted HQ Trivia with Scott Rogowsky and gave away $100,000 to one person.

On December 4, 2018, Hart was announced as the host of the 2019 Academy Awards. Two days later, however, he withdrew from hosting duties in the wake of backlash against him over several homophobic tweets he had posted between 2010 and 2011. He characterized the protest as unconstructive and argued: "If you don't believe people change, grow as they get older, I don't know what to tell you." On December 7, he tweeted an apology to the LGBTQ community following criticism for not issuing one the previous day. On January 3, 2019, Hart stated that he was going to reconsider stepping down as host, after openly lesbian comedian Ellen DeGeneres, who has hosted the Academy Awards multiple times, expressed support for him to do so and said she had contacted the academy to ask if Hart would be able to reverse his decision if he wished and, according to DeGeneres, they said he would be able to do so. On January 8, following backlash for what was perceived as an insincere apology by critics, Hart confirmed that he would not be hosting the Academy Awards. That year's ceremony was ultimately held without a host.

In September 2020, executives from the Muscular Dystrophy Association (MDA) announced plans to relaunch their annual MDA telethon and make Hart its new host, taking over duties that had been held from 1966 to 2010 by comedian and former National MDA Chairman Jerry Lewis. Entitled The MDA Kevin Hart Kids Telethon, the two-hour telethon was held on October 24, 2020, and was seen exclusively through participating social media platforms.

In 2024, Hart hosted the Netflix special The Roast of Tom Brady.

In December 2025, Hart co-hosted the 2026 FIFA World Cup draw at the Kennedy Center in Washington, D.C.

In 2026, Hart hosted Funny AF with Kevin Hart, a stand-up comedy competition on Netflix.

=== Music ===
As Chocolate Droppa, his alias, he signed to Motown Records and released Kevin Hart: What Now? (The Mixtape Presents Chocolate Droppa), the soundtrack to his stand-up film of the same name. He released the singles "Push It On Me" featuring Trey Songz and "Baller Alert" with Migos & T.I.

=== Modeling ===
In 2017, Hart and Tommy John appeared in an underwear commercial for Macy's.

=== Hart House ===
In August 2022, Hart debuted a vegan restaurant, Hart House, to compete with fast-food chains by "offering flavorful plant-based alternatives". The restaurant opened in Los Angeles, California, about a mile from Los Angeles International Airport (LAX), with a simple menu of veggie burgers and Chick'n products. The restaurant's offerings are claimed to be "entirely free of cholesterol, antibiotics, hormones, artificial colors, preservatives, high-fructose corn syrup, or trans fats", and inspired by Hart's own "health nut" lifestyle.

Hart opened a second location in Monrovia, California, in November 2022, a third on Sunset Boulevard in Hollywood, California, in May 2023, and a fourth location near the University of Southern California campus in June 2023. All locations closed in September 2024.

== Influences ==
Hart has cited George Carlin, Dave Chappelle, Bill Cosby, Eddie Murphy, Patrice O'Neal, Richard Pryor, Keith Robinson, Chris Rock, and Jerry Seinfeld as his influences.

== Personal life ==
Hart married Torrei Skipper in 2003, and they filed for divorce in 2010 after citing irreconcilable differences. Hart requested joint custody of their two children, a daughter born in 2005 and a son born in 2007. The divorce was finalized in November 2011.

On August 18, 2014, Hart became engaged to Eniko Parrish. They were married near Santa Barbara, California, on August 13, 2016. Their first child was born on November 21, 2017. A month later, he publicly admitted to having cheated on her while she was pregnant with their son. They reconciled and had a second child together, a daughter born on September 29, 2020.

An avid poker player since around 2010, Hart has entered major tournaments such as the World Series of Poker, cashing in one event for $4,783 in 2014. He also plays cash games, like the ones organized by PokerStars, and became their Brand Ambassador in 2017. As such, he was featured in PokerStars ad campaigns and promotional content, alongside Usain Bolt. As of September 2020, he has earned $47,828 in live tournament cashes.

Hart is a practicing Christian and has talked openly about his faith.

=== Health ===
On September 1, 2019, Hart was a passenger in a 1970 Plymouth Barracuda that went off Mulholland Highway and rolled down an embankment near Calabasas, California. He and the driver reportedly suffered "major back injuries". Hart was released from a hospital 10 days later, and continued recovery at a rehabilitation facility.

On August 23, 2023, Hart ran a 40-yard race with former National Football League running back Stevan Ridley, and tore his lower abductors on his abdomen. He required a wheelchair as part of his recovery and said afterward he is the "dumbest man alive" and "the age 40 is real", recommending no one attempt to race like he did.

=== Legal issues ===
On April 14, 2013, Hart was charged on suspicion of drunk driving after his vehicle nearly collided with a tanker truck on a Southern California freeway. He failed a field sobriety test and was booked for misdemeanor driving under the influence. On August 5, he was sentenced to three years of probation after pleading no contest to one count of driving under the influence of alcohol.

=== Height ===
Kevin Hart's height has been a subject of public curiosity and varying reports, with sources listing him anywhere between 5'2" and 5'5". In an April 2024 interview on 60 Minutes, Hart clarified his actual height, stating: "I'm 5-foot-5, like with a shoe on, like a sneaker. Now, if I put a boot on, I can get to 5'5" and a half." This clarification came after discrepancies in media reports, such as GQ listing him at 5'5" and the Los Angeles Times at 5'4". Hart often incorporates humor about his stature into his stand-up routines.

== Filmography ==
=== Film ===
Key
†	Denotes films that have not yet been released

Year	Title	Role	Notes
2002	Paper Soldiers	Shawn	
2003	Scary Movie 3	CJ Iz	
2003	Death of a Dynasty	Various roles	
2004	Along Came Polly	Vic	
2004	Soul Plane	Nashawn Wade	
2005	The 40-Year-Old Virgin	Smart Tech Customer	
2005	In the Mix	Busta	
2006	Scary Movie 4	CJ Iz	
2006	The Last Stand	F Stop/G Spot	
2007	Epic Movie	Silas	
2008	Fool's Gold	Bigg Bunny	
2008	Drillbit Taylor	Pawn Shop Dealer	
2008	Superhero Movie	Trey	
2008	Meet Dave	Number 17	
2008	Extreme Movie	Barry	
2009	Not Easily Broken	Tree	
2009	Kevin Hart: I'm a Grown Little Man	Himself	Stand-up film
2010	Death at a Funeral	Brian	
2010	Little Fockers	Nurse Louis	
2010	Something Like a Business	JoJo	
2010	Kevin Hart: Seriously Funny	Himself	Stand-up film
2011	35 and Ticking	Cleavon	
2011	Kevin Hart: Laugh at My Pain	Himself	Stand-up film
2011	Let Go	Kris Styles	
2012	Think Like a Man	Cedric Ward	
2012	Exit Strategy	Mannequin Head Man	
2012	The Five-Year Engagement	Doug	
2013	This Is the End	Himself	
2013	Kevin Hart: Let Me Explain	Himself	Stand-up film
2013	Grudge Match	Dante Slate Jr.	
2014	Ride Along	Ben Barber	
2014	About Last Night	Bernie	
2014	Think Like a Man Too	Cedric Ward	
2014	School Dance	OG Pretty Lil' Thug	
2014	Top Five	Charles	
2015	The Wedding Ringer	Jimmy Callahan/Bic Mitchum	
2015	Get Hard	Darnell Lewis	
2016	Ride Along 2	Ben Barber	
2016	Central Intelligence	Calvin Joyner	
2016	The Secret Life of Pets	Snowball	Voice
2016	Kevin Hart: What Now?	Himself	Stand-up film
2017	Captain Underpants: The First Epic Movie	George Beard	Voice
2017	The Upside	Dell Scott	
2017	Jumanji: Welcome to the Jungle	Franklin "Mouse" Finbar	
2018	Night School	Theodore "Teddy" Walker	Also writer and producer
2019	The Secret Life of Pets 2	Snowball	Voice
2019	Hobbs & Shaw	Air Marshall Dinkley	Uncredited
2019	Jumanji: The Next Level	Franklin "Mouse" Finbar	
2019	Kevin Hart: Irresponsible	Himself	Stand-up film
2020	Kevin Hart: Zero F**ks Given	Himself	Stand-up film
2021	Fatherhood	Matthew Logelin	Also producer
2021	The One and Only Dick Gregory	Himself	Also executive producer
2022	The Man from Toronto	Teddy Jackson	
2022	DC League of Super-Pets	Ace the Bat-Hound	Voice
2022	Me Time	Sonny Fisher	Also producer
2023	Back on the Strip	Uptight Dad	
2023	Kevin Hart: Reality Check	Himself	Stand-up film
2024	Lift	Cyrus Whittaker	Also producer
2024	Borderlands	Roland	
2025	Kevin Hart: Acting My Age	Himself	Stand-up film
2026	72 Hours	Joe	Also producer
2026	Livestream from Hell	Himself	Also producer
2026	Jumanji: Open World †	Franklin "Mouse" Finbar	Post-production
TBA	Ride Along 3 †	Ben Barber	Early development; Also producer

=== Television ===
Year	Title	Role	Notes
2002–2003	Undeclared	Luke	3 episodes
2004	The Big House	Kevin	Also co-executive producer
2004	Comedy Central Presents	Himself	Episode: "Kevin Hart"
2005	Barbershop	James Ricky	3 episodes
2005–2006	Jake in Progress	Nugget Dawson	2 episodes
2006	Help Me Help You	Kevin	Episode: "Raging Bill"
2006	Love, Inc.	James	2 episodes
2007	All of Us	Greg	Episode: "The B-R-E-A-K-U-P"
2007	Wild 'n Out	Various	21 episodes
2009	Party Down	Dro Grizzle	Episode: "Taylor Stiltskin Sweet Sixteen"
2009	Kröd Mändoon and the Flaming Sword of Fire	Zezelryck	6 episodes
2009	Kevin Hart: I'm a Grown Little Man	Himself	Stand-up special
2010	Kevin Hart: Seriously Funny	Himself	Stand-up special
2011–2012	Modern Family	Andre	2 episodes
2011	BET Awards 2011	Himself	Host; TV special
2012	Workaholics	Kevin	Episode: "To Kill a Chupacabraj"
2012	2012 MTV Video Music Awards	Himself	Host; TV special
2013–2016; 2022	Real Husbands of Hollywood	Himself	60 episodes; also co-creator, writer, executive producer
2013	Second Generation Wayans	Himself	Episode: "The Arrival"
2013–2017	Saturday Night Live	Himself	Host; 3 episodes
2015	Comedy Central Roast of Justin Bieber	Himself	Host; TV special
2016	2016 MTV Movie Awards	Himself	Co-host; TV special
2018	TKO: Total Knock Out	Himself	Host; also executive producer
2019	Kevin Hart's Guide to Black History	Himself	TV special; also executive producer
2019	Kevin Hart: Don't F**k This Up	Himself	6 episodes; also executive producer
2019	Kevin Hart: Irresponsible	Himself	Stand-up special
2020–present	Die Hart	Himself / Doug Eubanks	25 episodes; also executive producer
2020	Kevin Hart: Zero F**ks Given	Himself	Stand-up special
2021	Dave	Himself	Episode: "Dave"; also executive producer
2021	True Story	Kid	7 episodes; also executive producer
2021	Live in Front of a Studio Audience	Arnold Drummond	Episode: "Diff'rent Strokes and The Facts of Life"
2021–present	Hart to Heart	Himself	Host; also creator and executive producer
2023	Kevin Hart: Reality Check	Himself	Stand-up special
2024	The Roast of Tom Brady	Himself	Host; TV special
2024	Abbott Elementary	Himself	Episode: "Mother's Day"
2024	Fight Night: The Million Dollar Heist	Chicken Man	Miniseries, also executive producer
2024	Secret Level	Buddibot	Voice; episode: "Playtime: Fullfillment"
2025–present	Lil Kev	Kevin Darnell Hart	Voice; also executive producer
2025	Love, Death & Robots	Air Ionizer	Voice; episode: "Smart Appliances, Stupid Owners"
2025	BET Awards 2025	Himself	Host; TV special
2026	The Roast of Kevin Hart	Himself	Roastee; TV special
2026	Funny AF with Kevin Hart	Himself	Host; TV special

=== Music videos ===
Year	Song	Artist	Role
2004	"Lean Back"	Terror Squad featuring Fat Joe and Remy Ma	Himself
2007	"Get Buck in Here"	DJ Felli Fel featuring Diddy, Akon, Ludacris and Lil Jon	Himself
2011	"Booty Wurk (One Cheek at a Time)"	T-Pain	Himself
2012	"Think Like a Man"	Jennifer Hudson and Ne-Yo featuring Rick Ross	Himself
2014	"Can You Do This"	Aloe Blacc	Jimmy Callahan
2016	"Push it On Me"	Trey Songz	Chocolate Droppa
2017	"Jumanji Jumanji"	Nick Jonas and Jack Black	Himself
2018	"Kevin's Heart"	J. Cole	Himself
2019	"Earth"	Lil Dicky	Kanye West
2024	"AMP Freshman Cypher"	Kai Cenat	Himself

== Tours ==
- What Now? Tour (2015–2016)
- Irresponsible Tour (2017–2018)
- Reality Check Tour (2022–2023)
- Acting My Age (2024–present)

== Works ==
=== Discography ===
- Kevin Hart: What Now? (The Mixtape Presents Chocolate Droppa) (2016)

=== Bibliography ===
- I Can't Make This Up: Life Lessons (2017)
- The Decision: Overcoming Today's BS for Tomorrow's Success (2020)
- Marcus Makes a Movie (2021)
- Marcus Makes It Big (2022)
- Monsters and How to Tame Them: Taking Charge of the Voices in Your Head (2022)

== Awards and nominations ==
Year	Award	Category	Work	Result	Ref.
2004	Teen Choice Awards	Choice Breakout TV Star – Male	The Big House	Nominated	
2005	Black Entertainment Television (BET) Comedy Award	Platinum Mic Viewers' Choice		Nominated	
2012	BET Awards	Best Actor	Kevin Hart: Laugh at My Pain	Won	
2012	Teen Choice Awards	Choice Movie: Male Scene Stealer	Think Like a Man	Nominated	
2012	Teen Choice Awards	Choice Movie Hissy Fit	Think Like a Man	Nominated	
2014	BET Awards	Best Actor	Ride Along, Real Husbands of Hollywood, About Last Night	Nominated	
2014	NAACP Image Awards	Outstanding Comedy Series	Real Husbands of Hollywood	Won	
2014	NAACP Image Awards	Outstanding Actor in a Comedy Series	Real Husbands of Hollywood	Won	
2014	NAACP Image Awards	Entertainer of the Year		Won	
2014	Nickelodeon Kids' Choice Awards	Favorite Funny Star	Grudge Match	Won	
2014	MTV Movie Awards	Best Comedic Performance	Ride Along	Nominated	
2014	MTV Movie Awards	Best On-Screen Duo (with Ice Cube)	Ride Along	Nominated	
2014	Acalpulco Black Film Festival	Artist of the Year	Kevin Hart: Let Me Explain, This Is the End, Grudge Match	Won	
2014	Teen Choice Awards	Choice TV: Reality Show	Real Husbands of Hollywood	Nominated	
2014	Teen Choice Awards	Choice Movie Actor: Comedy	Ride Along	Won	
2014	Teen Choice Awards	Choice Movie: Chemistry (with Ice Cube)	Ride Along	Nominated	
2014	Teen Choice Awards	Choice Movie: Hissy Fit	Ride Along	Nominated	
2014	Teen Choice Awards	Choice Comedian		Won	
2015	NAACP Image Awards	Outstanding Comedy Series	Real Husbands of Hollywood	Nominated	
2015	NAACP Image Awards	Outstanding Actor in a Comedy Series	Real Husbands of Hollywood	Nominated	
2015	MTV Movie Awards	Best Comedic Performance	The Wedding Ringer	Nominated	
2015	MTV Movie Awards	Comedic Genius Award		Won	
2015	BET Awards	Best Actor	The Wedding Ringer, Think Like a Man Too, Real Husbands of Hollywood and Top Five	Nominated	
2015	Teen Choice Awards	Choice Comedian		Nominated	
2016	Billboard Touring Awards	Top Comedy Tour		Won	
2016	People's Choice Awards	Favorite Comedic Movie Actor	The Wedding Ringer	Won	
2016	People's Choice Awards	Favorite Cable TV Comedy	Real Husbands of Hollywood	Nominated	
2016	People's Choice Awards	Favorite Cable TV Actor	Real Husbands of Hollywood	Won	
2016	MTV Movie Awards	Best Comedic Performance	Ride Along 2	Nominated	
2016	Teen Choice Awards	Choice Movie Actor: Comedy	Ride Along 2	Nominated	
2016	Teen Choice Awards	Choice Movie: Hissy Fit	Ride Along 2	Nominated	
2016	Teen Choice Awards	Choice Comedian		Nominated	
2016	Teen Choice Awards	Choice Twit		Nominated	
2016	Teen Choice Awards	Choice Movie Actor: Summer	Central Intelligence	Won	
2017	People's Choice Awards	Favorite Movie Actor	Central Intelligence	Nominated	
2017	People's Choice Awards	Favorite Comedic Movie Actor	Central Intelligence	Won	
2017	People's Choice Awards	Favorite Cable TV Comedy	Real Husbands of Hollywood	Nominated	
2017	People's Choice Awards	Favorite Cable TV Actor	Real Husbands of Hollywood	Nominated	
2017	People's Choice Awards	Favorite Comedic Collaboration (shared with Conan O'Brien and Ice Cube)	Conan	Nominated	
2017	People's Choice Awards	Favorite Animated Movie Voice	The Secret Life of Pets	Nominated	
2017	NAACP Image Awards	Outstanding Actor in a Comedy Series	Real Husbands of Hollywood	Nominated	
2017	NAACP Image Awards	Outstanding Character Voice-Over Performance – (Television or Film)	The Secret Life of Pets	Nominated	
2017	Nickelodeon Kids' Choice Awards	Favorite Voice From an Animated Movie	The Secret Life of Pets	Nominated	
2017	Nickelodeon Kids' Choice Awards	Favorite Villain	The Secret Life of Pets	Won	
2017	Nickelodeon Kids' Choice Awards	Most Wanted Pet	The Secret Life of Pets	Won	
2017	Nickelodeon Kids' Choice Awards	Best Friends Forever (shared with Dwayne Johnson)	Central Intelligence	Won	
2017	Nickelodeon Kids' Choice Awards	Best Friends Forever (shared with Ice Cube)	Ride Along 2	Nominated	
2017	Teen Choice Awards	Choice Comedian		Nominated	
2018	Grammy Awards	Best Comedy Album	Kevin Hart: What Now?	Nominated	
2018	Black Reel Awards	Outstanding Voice Performance	Captain Underpants: The First Epic Movie	Nominated	
2018	Nickelodeon Kids' Choice Awards	Favorite Movie Actor	Jumanji: Welcome to the Jungle	Nominated	
2018	MTV Movie Awards	Best On-Screen Team (shared with Dwayne Johnson, Jack Black, Karen Gillan and Nick Jonas)	Jumanji: Welcome to the Jungle	Nominated	
2018	Teen Choice Awards	Choice Movie Actor – Comedy	Jumanji: Welcome to the Jungle	Nominated	
2018	Teen Choice Awards	Choice Comedian		Nominated	
2018	People's Choice Awards	The Comedy Act of 2018		Won	
2019	Teen Choice Awards	Choice Comedy Movie Acto	Night School	Nominated	
2019	Teen Choice Awards	Choice Comedian		Nominated	
2020	Nickelodeon Kids' Choice Awards	Favorite Movie Actor	Jumanji: The Next Level	Nominated	
2020	Nickelodeon Kids' Choice Awards	Favorite Male Voice from an Animated Movie	The Secret Life of Pets 2	Nominated	
2020	Primetime Emmy Awards	Outstanding Unstructured Reality Program	Kevin Hart: Don't Fuck This Up	Nominated	
2021	Primetime Emmy Awards	Outstanding Actor in a Short Form Comedy or Drama Series	Die Hart	Nominated	
2022	Grammy Awards	Best Comedy Album	Zero Fucks Given	Nominated	
2023	Primetime Emmy Awards	Outstanding Actor in a Short Form Comedy or Drama Series	Die Hart 2: Die Harter	Nominated	
2024	The Streamer Awards	Best Streamed Collab (shared with Kai Cenat and Druski)	Sleepover Stream	Won	
2025	Golden Raspberry Awards	Worst Supporting Actor	Borderlands	Nominated	
2025	Sports Emmy Awards	Outstanding Interactive Experience	Games of the XXXIII Olympiad	Won	
2026	Golden Globes Awards	Best Performance in Stand-Up Comedy on Television	Kevin Hart: Acting My Age	Nominated	
