= BET Award for Sportswoman of the Year =

American entertainment award category

BET Awards for Sportswoman of the Year
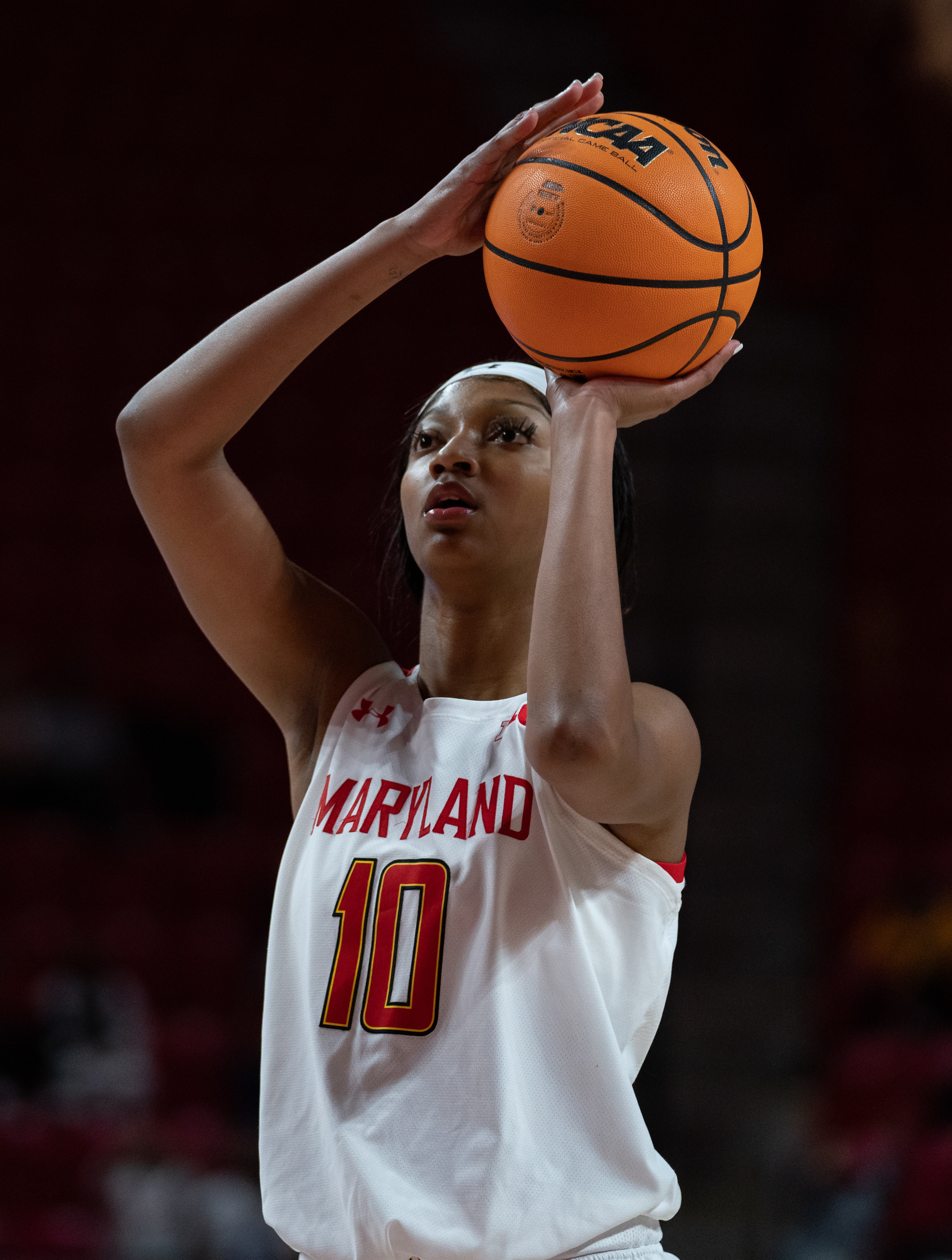
- Angel Reese is the most recent recipient
- Country: United States
- Presented by: BET Awards
- First award: 2001
- Currently held by: Angel Reese (2025)

Highlights
- Most wins: Serena Williams (16)
- Most nominations: Serena Williams (23)

The BET Award for Sportswoman of the Year is given to the best and most successful black female athlete of the previous year. The award was originally titled Best Female Athlete, but was later changed to its current title in 2010. Serena Williams holds the records in this category for most wins (16) and most nominations (23).

== Winners and nominees ==
Winners are listed first and highlighted in bold.

=== 2000s ===
Year	Sportswoman	Ref
2001
2001	**Serena Williams**	
2001	Laila Ali	
2001	Lisa Leslie	
2001	Venus Williams	
2002
2002	**Serena Williams**	
2002	Laila Ali	
2002	Lisa Leslie	
2002	Vonetta Flowers	
2002	Venus Williams	
2003
2003	**Serena Williams**	
2003	Laila Ali	
2003	Lisa Leslie	
2003	Sheryl Swoopes	
2003	Venus Williams	
2004
2004	**Serena Williams**	
2004	Laila Ali	
2004	Cheryl Ford	
2004	Lisa Leslie	
2004	Venus Williams	
2005
2005	**Serena Williams**	
2005	Laila Ali	
2005	Gail Devers	
2005	Lisa Leslie	
2005	Venus Williams	
2006
2006	**Venus Williams**	
2006	Chamique Holdsclaw	
2006	Lisa Leslie	
2006	Sheryl Swoopes	
2006	Serena Williams	
2007
2007	**Serena Williams**	
2007	Swin Cash	
2007	Tamika Catchings	
2007	Gail Devers	
2007	Lisa Leslie	
2008
2008	**Candace Parker**	
2008	Tamika Catchings	
2008	Cheryl Ford	
2008	Serena Williams	
2008	Venus Williams	
2009
2009	**Serena Williams**	
2009	Tamika Catchings	
2009	Lisa Leslie	
2009	Candace Parker	
2009	Venus Williams	

=== 2010s ===
Year	Sportswoman	Ref
2010
2010	**Serena Williams**	
2010	Tamika Catchings	
2010	Vanessa James	
2010	Candace Parker	
2010	Venus Williams	
2011
2011	**Serena Williams**	
2011	Tamika Catchings	
2011	Candice Dupree	
2011	Maya Moore	
2011	Venus Williams	
2012
2012	**Serena Williams**	
2012	Skylar Diggins-Smith	
2012	Brittney Griner	
2012	Candace Parker	
2012	Venus Williams	
2013
2013	**Gabrielle Douglas**	
2013	Brittney Griner	
2013	Candace Parker	
2013	Serena Williams	
2013	Venus Williams	
2014
2014	**Serena Williams**	
2014	Skylar Diggins-Smith	
2014	Brittney Griner	
2014	Lolo Jones	
2014	Venus Williams	
2015
2015	**Serena Williams**	
2015	Skylar Diggins-Smith	
2015	Brittney Griner	
2015	Candace Parker	
2015	Venus Williams	
2016
2016	**Serena Williams**	
2016	Skylar Diggins-Smith	
2016	Gabrielle Douglas	
2016	Venus Williams	
2016	Cheyenne Woods	
2017
2017	**Serena Williams**	
2017	Simone Biles	
2017	Skylar Diggins-Smith	
2017	Gabrielle Douglas	
2017	Venus Williams	
2018
2018	**Serena Williams**	
2018	Elana Meyers Taylor	
2018	Candace Parker	
2018	Skylar Diggins-Smith	
2018	Venus Williams	
2019
2019	**Serena Williams**	
2019	Allyson Felix	
2019	Candace Parker	
2019	Naomi Osaka	
2019	Simone Biles	

=== 2020s ===
Year	Sportswoman	Ref
2020
2020	**Simone Biles**	
2020	Ajeé Wilson	
2020	Claressa Shields	
2020	Coco Gauff	
2020	Naomi Osaka	
2020	Serena Williams	
2021
2021	**Naomi Osaka**	
2021	A'ja Wilson	
2021	Candace Parker	
2021	Claressa Shields	
2021	Serena Williams	
2021	Skylar Diggins-Smith	
2022
2022	**Naomi Osaka**	
2022	Brittney Griner	
2022	Candace Parker	
2022	Serena Williams	
2022	Sha'Carri Richardson	
2022	Simone Biles	
2023
2023	**Angel Reese**	
2023	Alexis Morris	
2023	Allyson Felix	
2023	Candace Parker	
2023	Naomi Osaka	
2023	Serena Williams	
2023	Sha'Carri Richardson	
2024
2024	**Angel Reese**	
2024	A'ja Wilson	
2024	Coco Gauff	
2024	Flau'jae Johnson	
2024	Juju Watkins	
2024	Naomi Osaka	
2024	Sha'Carri Richardson	
2024	Simone Biles	

== Multiple wins and nominations ==
=== Wins ===
16 wins

- Serena Williams

2 wins

- Naomi Osaka

2 wins

- Angel Reese

=== Nominations ===
23 nominations

- Serena Williams

17 nominations

- Venus Williams

11 nominations

- Candace Parker

8 nominations

- Lisa Leslie

7 nominations

- Skylar Diggins-Smith

6 nominations

- Naomi Osaka

5 nominations

- Tamika Catchings
- Brittney Griner
- Laila Ali
- Simone Biles

3 nominations

- Gabrielle Douglas
- Sheryl Swoopes

2 nominations

- Gail Devers
- Cheryl Ford

== See also ==
- BET Award for Sportsman of the Year
