= BET Award for Best International Act: UK =

American entertainment award category

BET Awards for Best International Act: UK
- Country: United States
- Presented by: BET Awards
- First award: 2011
- Currently held by: Skepta (2016)

The BET Award for Best International Act: UK was an award given to honor the outstanding achievements of international artists from the United Kingdom every year. The category was retired in 2017 and incorporated into Best International Act: Europe.

== Winners and nominees ==
Winners are listed first and highlighted in bold.

=== 2010s ===
Year	Artist	Ref
2011
2011	**Tinie Tempah**	
2011	VV Brown	
2011	Chipmunk	
2011	Laura Izibor	
2011	Skepta	
2011	Tinchy Stryder	
2012
2012	**Wretch 32**	
2012	Estelle	
2012	Labrinth	
2012	Emeli Sandé	
2012	Sway	
2013
2013	**Emeli Sandé**	
2013	Marsha Ambrosius	
2013	Estelle	
2013	Labrinth	
2013	Rita Ora	
2013	Wiley	
2014
2014	**Krept and Konan**	
2014	Ghetts	
2014	Laura Mvula	
2014	Rita Ora	
2014	Dizzee Rascal	
2014	Tinie Tempah	
2015
2015	**Stormzy**	
2015	FKA Twigs	
2015	Fuse ODG	
2015	Lethal Bizzle	
2015	Little Simz	
2015	MNEK	
2016
2016	**Skepta**	
2016	Kano	
2016	Krept and Konan	
2016	Lianne La Havas	
2016	Stormzy	

== Multiple wins and nominations ==
=== Nominations ===
2 nominations

- Estelle
- Krept and Konan
- Labrinth
- Rita Ora
- Emeli Sandé
- Skepta
- Stormzy
- Tinie Tempah

== See also ==
- BET Award for Best International Act: Africa
