= BET Award for Sportsman of the Year =

American entertainment award category

BET Awards for Sportsman of the Year
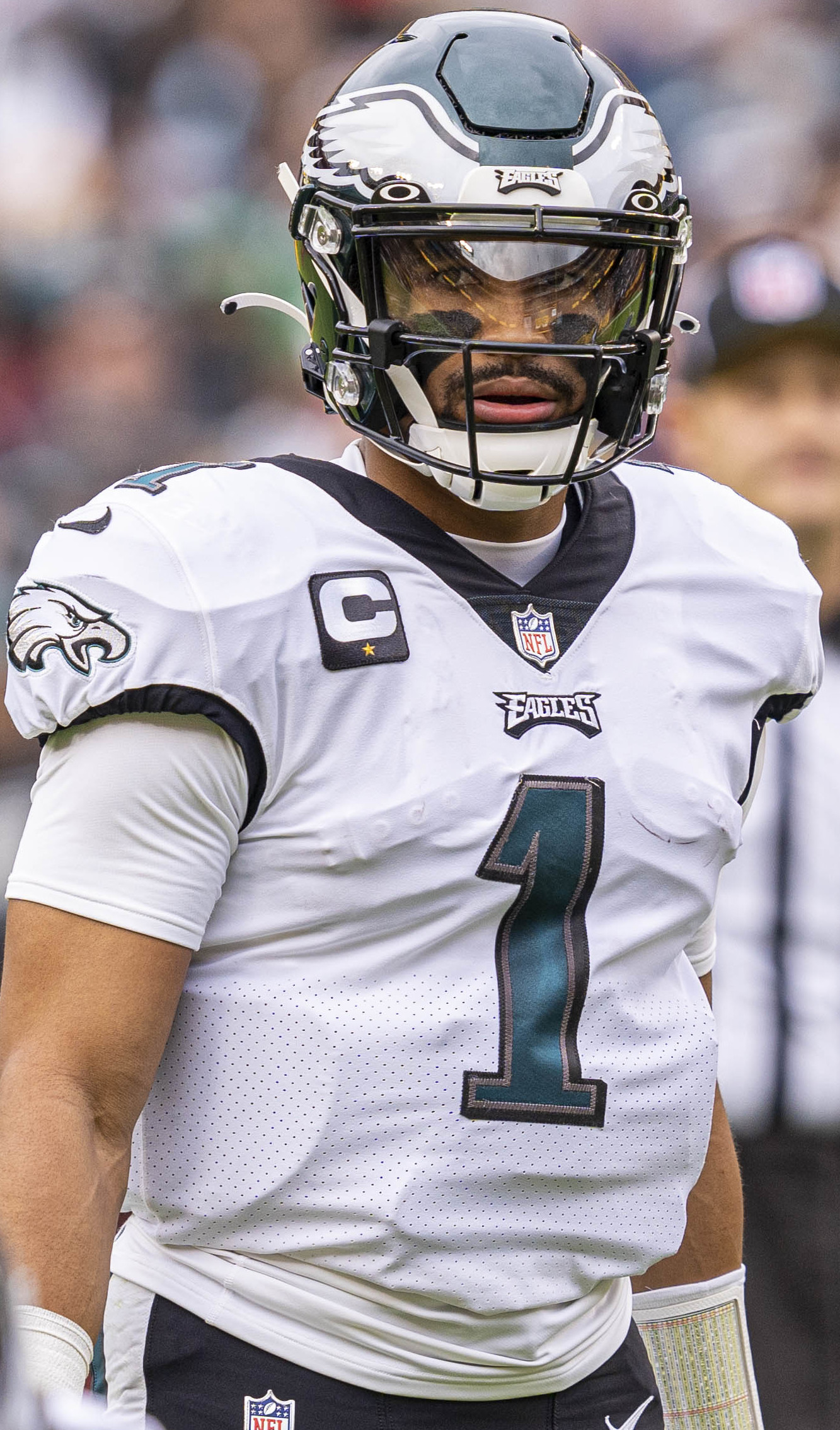
- Jalen Hurts is the most recent recipient
- Country: United States
- Presented by: BET Awards
- First award: 2001
- Currently held by: Jalen Hurts (2025)

Highlights
- Most wins: LeBron James (9)
- Most nominations: LeBron James (21)

The BET Award for Sportsman of the Year is given to the best and most successful male athlete of the previous year. The award was originally titled Best Male Athlete, but was later changed to its current title in 2010. LeBron James holds the record for most wins in this category with nine.

== Winners and nominees ==
Winners are listed first and highlighted in bold.

=== 2000s ===
| Year | Sportsman | Ref |
|---|---|---|
2001
| 2001 | **Allen Iverson** | |
| 2001 | Kobe Bryant | |
| 2001 | Shaquille O'Neal | |
| 2001 | Tiger Woods | |
2002
| 2002 | **Kobe Bryant** | |
| 2002 | Allen Iverson | |
| 2002 | Derek Jeter | |
| 2002 | Michael Jordan | |
| 2002 | Tiger Woods | |
2003
| 2003 | **Kobe Bryant** | |
| 2003 | Barry Bonds | |
| 2003 | Allen Iverson | |
| 2003 | Tracy McGrady | |
| 2003 | Tiger Woods | |
2004
| 2004 | **LeBron James** | |
| 2004 | Carmelo Anthony | |
| 2004 | Barry Bonds | |
| 2004 | Shaquille O'Neal | |
| 2004 | Tiger Woods | |
2005
| 2005 | **Shaquille O'Neal** | |
| 2005 | Allen Iverson | |
| 2005 | LeBron James | |
| 2005 | Donovan McNabb | |
| 2005 | Tiger Woods | |
2006
| 2006 | **LeBron James** | |
| 2006 | Kobe Bryant | |
| 2006 | Shaquille O'Neal | |
| 2006 | Tiger Woods | |
| 2006 | Vince Young | |
2007
| 2007 | **LeBron James** | |
| 2007 | Reggie Bush | |
| 2007 | Floyd Mayweather Jr. | |
| 2007 | Dwyane Wade | |
| 2007 | Tiger Woods | |
2008
| 2008 | **Kobe Bryant** | |
| 2008 | LeBron James | |
| 2008 | Floyd Mayweather Jr. | |
| 2008 | Chris Paul | |
| 2008 | Tiger Woods | |
2009
| 2009 | **LeBron James** | |
| 2009 | Kobe Bryant | |
| 2009 | Reggie Bush | |
| 2009 | Dwyane Wade | |
| 2009 | Tiger Woods | |

=== 2010s ===
| Year | Sportsman | Ref |
|---|---|---|
2010
| 2010 | **LeBron James** | |
| 2010 | Carmelo Anthony | |
| 2010 | Usain Bolt | |
| 2010 | Kobe Bryant | |
| 2010 | Tiger Woods | |
2011
| 2011 | **Michael Vick** | |
| 2011 | Carmelo Anthony | |
| 2011 | Kobe Bryant | |
| 2011 | LeBron James | |
| 2011 | Derrick Rose | |
2012
| 2012 | **Kevin Durant** | |
| 2012 | Carmelo Anthony | |
| 2012 | Kobe Bryant | |
| 2012 | Victor Cruz | |
| 2012 | LeBron James | |
2013
| 2013 | **LeBron James** | |
| 2013 | Victor Cruz | |
| 2013 | Kevin Durant | |
| 2013 | Robert Griffin III | |
| 2013 | Ray Lewis | |
2014
| 2014 | **Kevin Durant** | |
| 2014 | Carmelo Anthony | |
| 2014 | Blake Griffin | |
| 2014 | LeBron James | |
| 2014 | Floyd Mayweather Jr. | |
2015
| 2015 | **Stephen Curry** | |
| 2015 | LeBron James | |
| 2015 | Marshawn Lynch | |
| 2015 | Floyd Mayweather Jr. | |
| 2015 | Chris Paul | |
2016
| 2016 | **Stephen Curry** | |
| 2016 | Odell Beckham Jr. | |
| 2016 | Kobe Bryant | |
| 2016 | LeBron James | |
| 2016 | Cam Newton | |
2017
| 2017 | **Stephen Curry** | |
| 2017 | Odell Beckham Jr. | |
| 2017 | LeBron James | |
| 2017 | Cam Newton | |
| 2017 | Russell Westbrook | |
2018
| 2018 | **LeBron James** | |
| 2018 | Dwyane Wade | |
| 2018 | Odell Beckham Jr. | |
| 2018 | Stephen Curry | |
| 2018 | Kevin Durant | |
2019
| 2019 | **Stephen Curry** | |
| 2019 | Kevin Durant | |
| 2019 | LeBron James | |
| 2019 | Odell Beckham Jr. | |
| 2019 | Tiger Woods | |

=== 2020s ===
| Year | Sportsman | Ref |
|---|---|---|
2020
| 2020 | **LeBron James** | |
| 2020 | Giannis Antetokounmpo | |
| 2020 | Kawhi Leonard | |
| 2020 | Odell Beckham Jr. | |
| 2020 | Patrick Mahomes II | |
| 2020 | Stephen Curry | |
2021
| 2021 | **LeBron James** | |
| 2021 | Kyrie Irving | |
| 2021 | Patrick Mahomes II | |
| 2021 | Russell Westbrook | |
| 2021 | Russell Wilson | |
| 2021 | Stephen Curry | |
2022
| 2022 | **Stephen Curry** | |
| 2022 | Aaron Donald | |
| 2022 | Bubba Wallace | |
| 2022 | Giannis Antetokounmpo | |
| 2022 | Ja Morant | |
| 2022 | LeBron James | |
2023
| 2023 | **Jalen Hurts** | |
| 2023 | Aaron Judge | |
| 2023 | Bubba Wallace | |
| 2023 | Gervonta Davis | |
| 2023 | LeBron James | |
| 2023 | Patrick Mahomes II | |
| 2023 | Stephen Curry | |
2024
| 2024 | **Jalen Brunson** | |
| 2024 | Anthony Edwards | |
| 2024 | Gervonta Davis | |
| 2024 | Jalen Hurts | |
| 2024 | Kyrie Irving | |
| 2024 | LeBron James | |
| 2024 | Patrick Mahomes II | |
| 2024 | Stephen Curry | |

== Controversy ==
Some of the nominations have brought up some controversy. Reggie Bush was nominated for the award twice, in 2007 and 2009, despite putting up average numbers for a player at his position in both those seasons. In both years, he was nominated among athletes who were considered the best of the best in their sports, which upset some sports fans, as Bush has not accomplished enough to be in the same list as them.

== Multiple wins and nominations ==
=== Wins ===
9 wins

- LeBron James

5 wins

- Stephen Curry

3 wins

- Kobe Bryant

2 wins

- Kevin Durant

=== Nominations ===
21 nominations

- LeBron James

10 nominations

- Kobe Bryant
- Stephen Curry
- Tiger Woods

5 nominations

- Carmelo Anthony
- Odell Beckham Jr.

4 nominations

- Allen Iverson
- Patrick Mahomes II
- Floyd Mayweather Jr.
- Shaquille O'Neal

3 nominations

- Kevin Durant

2 nominations

- Giannis Antetokounmpo
- Barry Bonds
- Reggie Bush
- Victor Cruz
- Gervonta Davis
- Jalen Hurts
- Kyrie Irving
- Cam Newton
- Chris Paul
- Dwyane Wade
- Bubba Wallace

== See also ==
- BET Award for Sportswoman of the Year
