= BET Award for Best Female Hip Hop Artist =

American entertainment award category

BET Awards for Best Female Hip Hop Artist
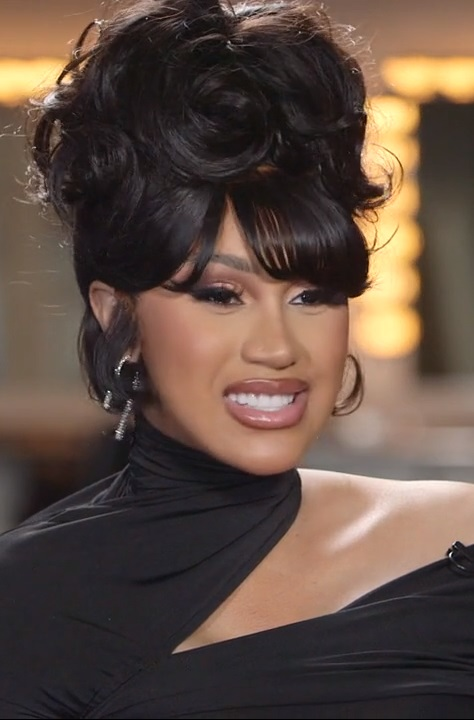
- Cardi B is the most recent recipient
- Country: United States
- Presented by: BET Awards
- First award: 2001
- Currently held by: Cardi B (2026)

Highlights
- Most wins: Nicki Minaj (8)
- Most nominations: Nicki Minaj (15)

The BET Award for Best Female Hip Hop Artist is an award given to honor the outstanding achievements female artists have made in hip hop every year. The winner is determined based on sales and overall quality of content released within the eligibility period. The all-time winner in this category is Nicki Minaj with eight wins as well as fifteen nominations.

== Winners and nominees ==
Winners are listed first and highlighted in bold.

=== 2000s ===
| Year | Artist | Ref |
|---|---|---|
2001
| 2001 | **Eve** | |
| 2001 | Da Brat | |
| 2001 | Lil' Kim | |
| 2001 | Missy Elliott | |
| 2001 | Trina | |
2002
| 2002 | **Missy Elliott** | |
| 2002 | Angie Martinez | |
| 2002 | Foxy Brown | |
| 2002 | Mystic | |
| 2002 | Rah Digga | |
| 2002 | Trina | |
2003
| 2003 | **Missy Elliott** | |
| 2003 | Eve | |
| 2003 | Lil' Kim | |
| 2003 | Ms. Jade | |
| 2003 | Trina | |
| 2003 | Foxy Brown | |
2004
| 2004 | **Missy Elliott** | |
| 2004 | Da Brat | |
| 2004 | Jacki-O | |
| 2004 | MC Lyte | |
| 2004 | Rah Digga | |
| 2004 | Foxy Brown | |
2005
| 2005 | **Remy Ma** | |
| 2005 | Jacki-O | |
| 2005 | Miri Ben-Ari | |
| 2005 | Shawnna | |
| 2005 | Foxy Brown | |
2006
| 2006 | **Missy Elliott** | |
| 2006 | Lil' Kim | |
| 2006 | Remy Ma | |
| 2006 | Shawnna | |
| 2006 | Trina | |
| 2007 | —N/a | |
2008
| 2008 | **Missy Elliott** | |
| 2008 | Eve | |
| 2008 | Kid Sister | |
| 2008 | Lil' Mama | |
| 2008 | Trina | |
| 2008 | Foxy Brown | |
2009
| 2009 | **M.I.A** | |
| 2009 | Lil' Mama | |
| 2009 | Trina | |

=== 2010s ===
| Year | Artist | Ref |
|---|---|---|
2010
| 2010 | **Nicki Minaj** | |
| 2010 | Ester Dean | |
| 2010 | Lil' Kim | |
| 2010 | Rasheeda | |
| 2010 | Trina | |
2011
| 2011 | **Nicki Minaj** | |
| 2011 | Cymphonique | |
| 2011 | Diamond | |
| 2011 | LoLa Monroe | |
2012
| 2012 | **Nicki Minaj** | |
| 2012 | Brianna Perry | |
| 2012 | Diamond | |
| 2012 | Trina | |
2013
| 2013 | **Nicki Minaj** | |
| 2013 | Azealia Banks | |
| 2013 | Eve | |
| 2013 | Rasheeda | |
| 2013 | Rye Rye | |
2014
| 2014 | **Nicki Minaj** | |
| 2014 | Angel Haze | |
| 2014 | Charli Baltimore | |
| 2014 | Eve | |
| 2014 | Iggy Azalea | |
2015
| 2015 | **Nicki Minaj** | |
| 2015 | Azealia Banks | |
| 2015 | Dej Loaf | |
| 2015 | Iggy Azalea | |
| 2015 | Tink | |
| 2015 | Trina | |
2016
| 2016 | **Nicki Minaj** | |
| 2016 | Dej Loaf | |
| 2016 | Lil' Kim | |
| 2016 | Missy Elliott | |
| 2016 | Remy Ma | |
2017
| 2017 | **Remy Ma** | |
| 2017 | Missy Elliott | |
| 2017 | Nicki Minaj | |
| 2017 | Cardi B | |
| 2017 | Young M.A | |
2018
| 2018 | **Cardi B** | |
| 2018 | Nicki Minaj | |
| 2018 | Remy Ma | |
| 2018 | Rapsody | |
| 2018 | Dej Loaf | |
2019
| 2019 | **Cardi B** | |
| 2019 | Kash Doll | |
| 2019 | Lizzo | |
| 2019 | Megan Thee Stallion | |
| 2019 | Nicki Minaj | |
| 2019 | Remy Ma | |

=== 2020s ===
| Year | Artist | Ref |
|---|---|---|
2020
| 2020 | **Megan Thee Stallion** | |
| 2020 | Cardi B | |
| 2020 | Doja Cat | |
| 2020 | Lizzo | |
| 2020 | Nicki Minaj | |
| 2020 | Saweetie | |
2021
| 2021 | **Megan Thee Stallion** | |
| 2021 | Cardi B | |
| 2021 | Coi Leray | |
| 2021 | Doja Cat | |
| 2021 | Latto | |
| 2021 | Saweetie | |
2022
| 2022 | **Megan Thee Stallion** | |
| 2022 | Cardi B | |
| 2022 | Doja Cat | |
| 2022 | Latto | |
| 2022 | Nicki Minaj | |
| 2022 | Saweetie | |
2023
| 2023 | **Latto** | |
| 2023 | Cardi B | |
| 2023 | Coi Leray | |
| 2023 | GloRilla | |
| 2023 | Ice Spice | |
| 2023 | Megan Thee Stallion | |
| 2023 | Nicki Minaj | |
2024
| 2024 | **Nicki Minaj** | |
| 2024 | Cardi B | |
| 2024 | Doja Cat | |
| 2024 | GloRilla | |
| 2024 | Ice Spice | |
| 2024 | Latto | |
| 2024 | Megan Thee Stallion | |
| 2024 | Sexyy Red | |
2025
| 2025 | **Doechii** | |
| 2025 | Cardi B | |
| 2025 | Doja Cat | |
| 2025 | GloRilla | |
| 2025 | Latto | |
| 2025 | Megan Thee Stallion | |
| 2025 | Nicki Minaj | |
| 2025 | Rapsody | |
| 2025 | Sexyy Red | |

== Multiple wins and nominations ==
=== Wins ===
8 wins

- Nicki Minaj

5 wins

- Missy Elliott

3 wins

- Megan Thee Stallion
- Cardi B

2 wins

- Remy Ma

1 win

- Eve
- M.I.A
- Latto

=== Nominations ===
15 nominations

- Nicki Minaj

9 nominations

- Cardi B
- Trina

8 nominations

- Missy Elliott

7 nominations

- Megan Thee Stallion

6 nominations

- Remy Ma

5 nominations

- Doja Cat
- Eve
- Latto
- Lil' Kim
- Foxy Brown

3 nominations

- Dej Loaf
- GloRilla
- Saweetie

2 nominations

- Azealia Banks
- Coi Leray
- Da Brat
- Diamond
- Ice Spice
- Iggy Azalea
- Jacki-O
- Lil' Mama
- Lizzo
- Rah Digga
- Rapsody
- Rasheeda
- Sexyy Red
- Shawnna

== See also ==
- List of music awards honoring women
- BET Award for Best Male Hip Hop Artist
