= BET Award for Dr. Bobby Jones Best Gospel/Inspirational Award =

American entertainment award category

BET Awards for Dr. Bobby Jones Best Gospel/Inspirational Award
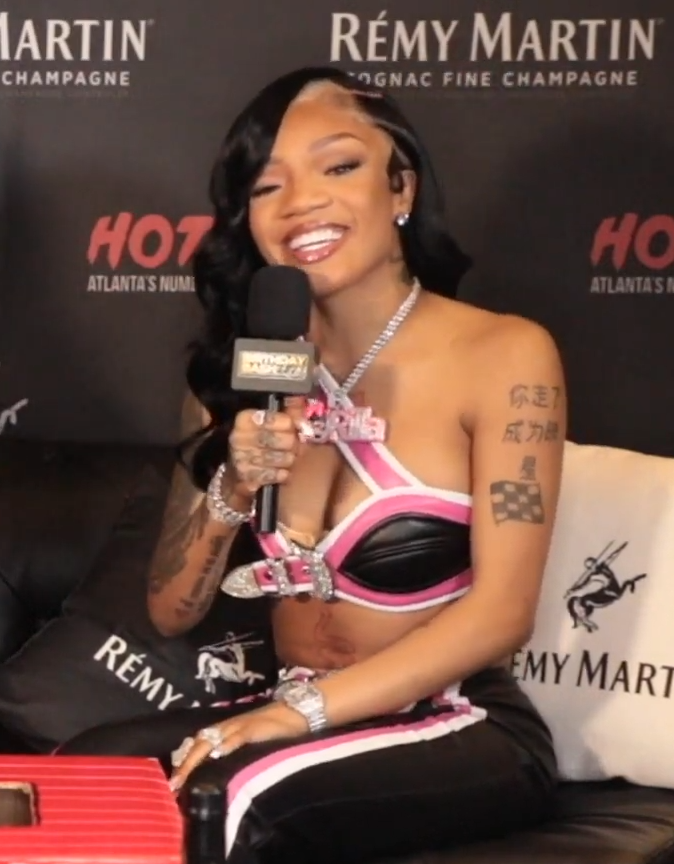
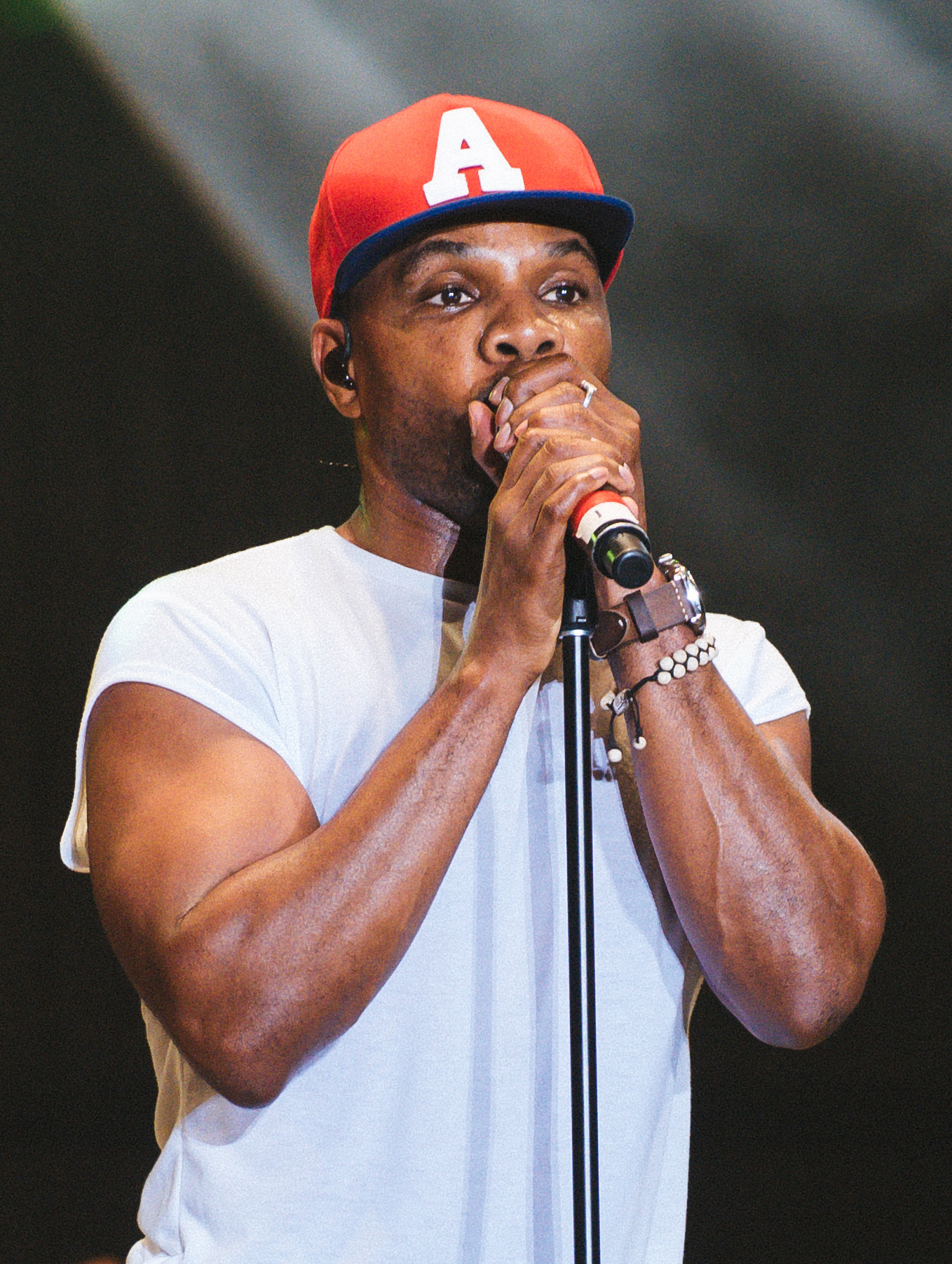
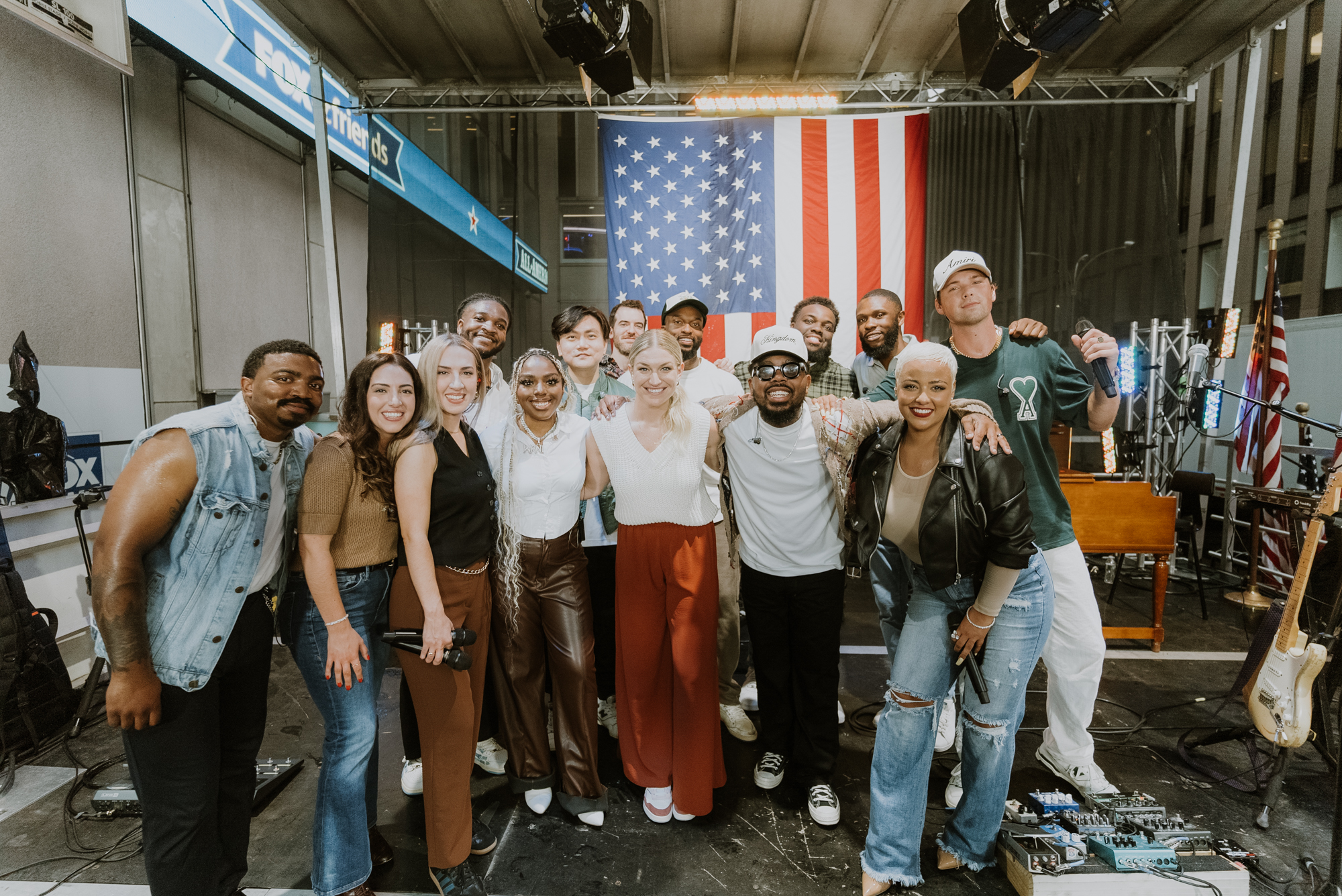
- "Rain Down on Me" by GloRilla featuring Kirk Franklin and Maverick City Music is the most recent recipient
- Country: United States
- Presented by: BET Awards
- First award: 2001
- Currently held by: GloRilla featuring Kirk Franklin and Maverick City Music – "Rain Down on Me" (2025)

Highlights
- Most wins: Kirk Franklin (8)
- Most nominations: Kirk Franklin (20)

The BET Awards Dr. Bobby Jones Best Gospel/Inspirational Award is given to an urban contemporary gospel artist. The winner is determined based on sales and overall quality of content released within the eligibility period. The award was originally titled Best Gospel Artist, but was later renamed to its current title in 2017. Kirk Franklin currently holds the record for this category, with seven wins.

== Winners and nominees ==
Winners are listed first and highlighted in bold.

=== 2000s ===
Year	Artist	Ref
2001
2001	**Donnie McClurkin**	
2001	Yolanda Adams	
2001	Kirk Franklin	
2001	Mary Mary	
2001	Hezekiah Walker	
2002
2002	**Yolanda Adams**	
2002	Kurt Carr	
2002	Kirk Franklin	
2002	Fred Hammond	
2002	CeCe Winans	
2003
2003	**Yolanda Adams**	
2003	Kirk Franklin	
2003	Donnie McClurkin	
2003	Smokie Norful	
2003	Tonéx	
2004
2004	**Yolanda Adams**	
2004	Byron Cage	
2004	Donnie McClurkin	
2004	Smokie Norful	
2004	Vickie Winans	
2005
2005	**Donnie McClurkin**	
2005	Fred Hammond	
2005	Ruben Studdard	
2005	Kanye West	
2005	CeCe Winans	
2006
2006	**Kirk Franklin**	
2006	Yolanda Adams	
2006	Mary Mary	
2006	Smokie Norful	
2006	CeCe Winans	
2007
2007	**Kirk Franklin**	
2007	Shirley Caesar	
2007	Fred Hammond	
2007	Dave Hollister	
2007	Mary Mary	
2008
2008	**Marvin Sapp**	
2008	The Clark Sisters	
2008	Kirk Franklin	
2008	Deitrick Haddon	
2008	Trin-I-Tee 5:7	
2009
2009	**Mary Mary**	
2009	Regina Belle	
2009	Shirley Caesar	
2009	Smokie Norful	
2009	Trin-I-Tee 5:7	

=== 2010s ===
Year	Artist	Song	Ref
2010
2010	**Marvin Sapp**		
2010	The Anointed Pace Sisters		
2010	Kirk Franklin Presents Artists United For Haiti		
2010	Tamela Mann		
2010	Vickie Winans		
2011
2011	**Mary Mary**		
2011	Byron Cage		
2011	Deitrick Haddon		
2011	Karen Clark Sheard		
2011	BeBe & CeCe Winans		
2012
2012	**Yolanda Adams**		
2012	Kim Burrell		
2012	James Fortune & FIYA		
2012	Fred Hammond		
2012	Trin-I-Tee 5:7		
2013
2013	**Mary Mary**		
2013	Deitrick Haddon		
2013	Lecrae		
2013	Tamela Mann		
2013	Marvin Sapp		
2014
2014	**Tamela Mann**		
2014	Erica Campbell		
2014	Donnie McClurkin		
2014	Tye Tribbett		
2014	Hezekiah Walker		
2015
2015	**Lecrae**		
2015	Erica Campbell		
2015	Deitrick Haddon		
2015	Fred Hammond		
2015	Mali Music		
2015	Michelle Williams		
2016
2016	**Kirk Franklin**		
2016	Erica Campbell		
2016	Anthony Brown & Group TherAPy		
2016	Tasha Cobbs		
2016	Lecrae		
2016	Tamela Mann		
2017
2017	**Lecrae**	**"Can't Stop Me Now (Destination)"**	
2017	Fantasia (feat. Tye Tribbett)	"I Made It"	
2017	Kirk Franklin (feat. Sarah Reeves, Tasha Cobbs and Tamela Mann)	"My World Needs You"	
2017	Tamela Mann	"God Provides"	
2017	CeCe Winans	"Never Have to Be Alone"	
2018
2018	**Lecrae (feat. Tori Kelly)**	**"I'll Find You"**	
2018	Marvin Sapp	"Close"	
2018	Ledisi & Kirk Franklin	"If You Don't Mind"	
2018	Snoop Dogg (feat. B.Slade)	"Words Are Few"	
2018	Tasha Cobbs Leonard (feat. Nicki Minaj)	"I'm Getting Ready"	
2019
2019	**Snoop Dogg (feat. Rance Allen)**	**"Blessing Me Again"**	
2019	Erica Campbell (feat. Warryn Campbell)	"All of My Life"	
2019	Fred Hammond	"Tell Me Where It Hurts"	
2019	Kirk Franklin	"Love Theory"	
2019	Tori Kelly (feat. Kirk Franklin)	"Never Alone"	

=== 2020s ===
Year	Artist	Song	Ref
2020
2020	**Kirk Franklin**	**"Just for Me"**	
2020	Fred Hammond	"Alright"	
2020	John P. Kee (feat. Zacardi Cortez)	"All of My Life"	
2020	Kanye West	"Follow God"	
2020	PJ Morton (feat. Le'Andria Johnson and Mary Mary)	"All In His Pain"	
2020	The Clark Sisters	"Victory"	
2021
2021	**Kirk Franklin**	**"Strong God"**	
2021	BeBe Winans	"In Jesus Name"	
2021	CeCe Winans	"Never Lost"	
2021	H.E.R.	"Hold Us Together"	
2021	Marvin Sapp	"Thank You for It All"	
2021	Tamela Mann	"Touch from You"	
2022
2022	**Kirk Franklin and Lil Baby**	**"We Win"**	
2022	Kanye West	"Come to Life"	
2022	Kelly Price	"Grace"	
2022	Fred Hammond	"Hallelujah"	
2022	H.E.R. and Tauren Wells	"Hold Us Together (Hope Mix)"	
2022	Elevation Worship and Maverick City Music	"Jireh"	
2022	Marvin Sapp	"All in Your Hands"	
2023
2023	**Maverick City Music & Kirk Franklin**	**"Bless Me"**	
2023	Tamela Mann	"Finished (Live)"	
2023	CeCe Winans	"I've Got Joy"	
2023	Maverick City Music & Kirk Franklin featuring Naomi Raine & Chandler Moore	"Kingdom"	
2023	Tye Tribbett	"New"	
2023	Yolanda Adams	"One Moment from Glory"	
2023	PJ Morton featuring Lisa Knowles-Smith, Le'Andria Johnson, Keke Wyatt, Kierra Sheard & Tasha Cobbs Leonard	"The Better Benediction (Pt.2)"	
2024
2024	**Tems**	**"Me & U"**	
2024	Shirley Caesar	"Award All of the Glory"	
2024	Kirk Franklin	"All Things"	
2024	Halle	"Angel"	
2024	CeCe Winans	"Come Jesus Come"	
2024	Erica Campbell	"Do You Believe in Love?"	
2024	Maverick City Music, Naomi Raine & Chandler Moore	"God Problems"	
2024	Kirk Franklin	"Try Love"	

== Multiple wins and nominations ==
=== Wins ===
7 wins

- Kirk Franklin

4 wins

- Yolanda Adams

3 wins

- Mary Mary
- Lecrae

2 wins

- Donnie McClurkin
- Marvin Sapp

=== Nominations ===
19 nominations

- Kirk Franklin

8 nominations

- Fred Hammond
- Tamela Mann
- CeCe Winans

7 nominations

- Mary Mary

6 nominations

- Yolanda Adams
- Marvin Sapp

5 nominations

- Erica Campbell
- Lecrae
- Donnie McClurkin

4 nominations

- Deitrick Haddon
- Maverick City Music
- Smokie Norful

3 nominations

- Shirley Caesar
- Tye Tribbett
- Trin-I-Tee 5:7
- Kanye West

2 nominations

- Byron Cage
- The Clark Sisters
- Tasha Cobbs
- H.E.R.
- Le'Andria Johnson
- Tasha Cobbs Leonard
- Chandler Moore
- Naomi Raine
- Hezekiah Walker
- Vickie Winans
