= BET Award for Best Group =

American entertainment award category

BET Awards for Best Group
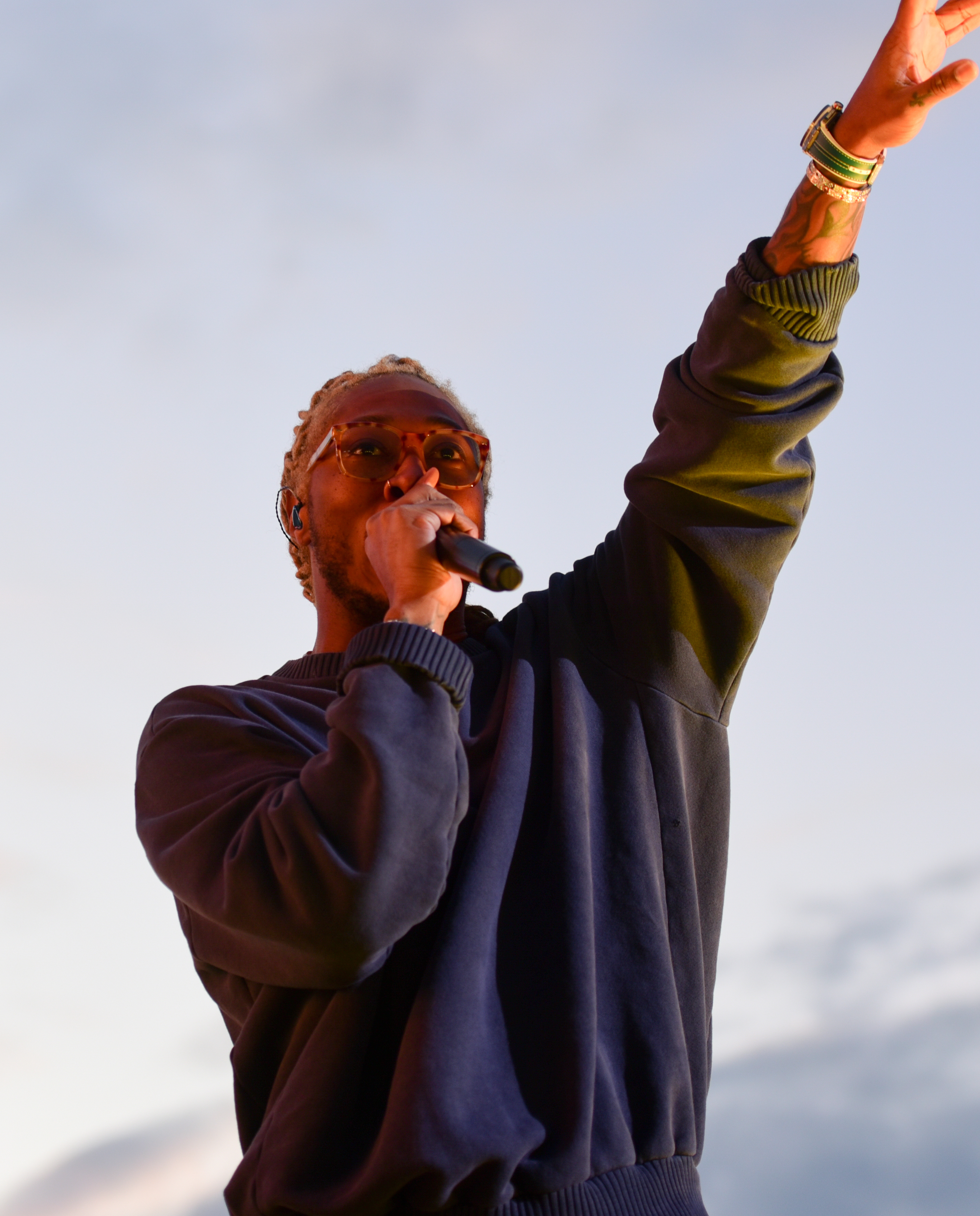
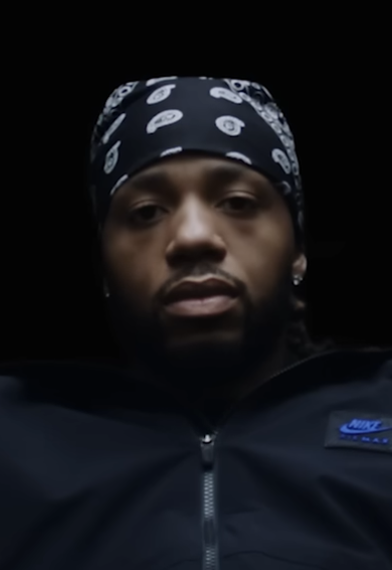
- Future and Metro Boomin is the most recent recipient
- Country: United States
- Presented by: BET Awards
- First award: 2001
- Currently held by: Future and Metro Boomin (2025)

Highlights
- Most wins: Migos (4)
- Most nominations: Quavo; Takeoff; (8 each)

The BET Award for Best Group is given to the overall best R&B, hip hop, or gospel group who has released an album the previous or same year. When the award was first given, it awarded male and female groups separately. It was combined the following year. Migos are the all-time winners in this category with four wins and have received the most nominations with seven as a group. Quavo and Takeoff are the artists with the most nominations with eight including seven nominations as a part of Migos.

== Winners and nominees ==
Winners are listed first and highlighted in bold.

=== 2000s ===
Year	Group	Ref
2001
2001	Best Female Group	
2001	**Destiny's Child**	
2001	3LW	
2001	702	
2001	Blaque	
2001	Mary Mary	
2001	Best Male Group	
2001	**Outkast**	
2001	112	
2001	Boyz II Men	
2001	Dr. Dre, Snoop Dogg and Nate Dogg	
2001	Jagged Edge	
2002
2002	**Outkast**	
2002	112	
2002	B2K	
2002	Destiny's Child	
2002	Jagged Edge	
2003
2003	**B2K**	
2003	Clipse	
2003	Floetry	
2003	Mary Mary	
2003	The Roots	
2004
2004	**Outkast**	
2004	Floetry	
2004	G-Unit	
2004	Jagged Edge	
2004	Lil' Jon & The Eastside Boyz	
2005
2005	**Destiny's Child**	
2005	112	
2005	Lil' Jon & The Eastside Boyz	
2005	The Roots	
2005	Terror Squad featuring Fat Joe	
2006
2006	**The Black Eyed Peas**	
2006	Destiny's Child	
2006	Floetry	
2006	Mary Mary	
2006	Three 6 Mafia	
2007
2007	**Gnarls Barkley**	
2007	Mary Mary	
2007	Outkast	
2007	Pretty Ricky	
2007	Three 6 Mafia	
2008
2008	**UGK**	
2008	Danity Kane	
2008	Day26	
2008	Gnarls Barkley	
2008	Playaz Circle	
2009
2009	**Day26**	
2009	GS Boyz	
2009	N.E.R.D.	
2009	The Roots	
2009	Three 6 Mafia	

=== 2010s ===
Year	Group	Ref
2010
2010	**Young Money**	
2010	The Black Eyed Peas	
2010	Clipse	
2010	Diddy – Dirty Money	
2010	New Boyz	
2011
2011	**Diddy – Dirty Money**	
2011	Cali Swag District	
2011	N.E.R.D.	
2011	New Boyz	
2011	Travis Porter	
2012
2012	**The Throne**	
2012	Bad Meets Evil	
2012	Diddy – Dirty Money	
2012	Maybach Music Group	
2012	Mindless Behavior	
2013
2013	**Macklemore and Ryan Lewis**	
2013	Mary Mary	
2013	Mindless Behavior	
2013	Slaughterhouse	
2013	The Throne	
2014
2014	**Young Money**	
2014	A$AP Mob	
2014	Daft Punk	
2014	Macklemore and Ryan Lewis	
2014	TGT	
2015
2015	**Rae Sremmurd**	
2015	A$AP Mob	
2015	Jodeci	
2015	Migos	
2015	Rich Gang	
2015	Young Money	
2016
2016	**Drake and Future**	
2016	2 Chainz and Lil Wayne	
2016	Puff Daddy and The Family	
2016	Rae Sremmurd	
2016	The Internet	
2017
2017	**Migos**	
2017	2 Chainz and Lil Wayne	
2017	A Tribe Called Quest	
2017	Fat Joe and Remy Ma	
2017	Rae Sremmurd	
2018
2018	**Migos**	
2018	N.E.R.D	
2018	Rae Sremmurd	
2018	A Tribe Called Quest	
2018	Chloe x Halle	
2019
2019	**Migos**	
2019	Chloe x Halle	
2019	City Girls	
2019	Lil Baby and Gunna	
2019	The Carters	

=== 2020s ===
Year	Group	Ref
2020
2020	**Migos**	
2020	Chloe x Halle	
2020	City Girls	
2020	EarthGang	
2020	Griselda	
2020	JackBoys	
2021
2021	**Silk Sonic**	
2021	21 Savage and Metro Boomin	
2021	Chloe x Halle	
2021	Chris Brown and Young Thug	
2021	City Girls	
2021	Migos	
2022
2022	**Silk Sonic**	
2022	Chloe x Halle	
2022	City Girls	
2022	Lil Baby and Lil Durk	
2022	Migos	
2022	Young Dolph and Key Glock	
2023
2023	**Drake and 21 Savage**	
2023	City Girls	
2023	DVSN	
2023	FLO	
2023	Maverick City Music and Kirk Franklin	
2023	Quavo and Takeoff	
2023	Wanmor	
2024
2024	¥$	
2024	2 Chainz and Lil Wayne	
2024	41	
2024	Blxst and Bino Rideaux	
2024	City Girls	
2024	FLO	
2024	Maverick City Music	
2024	Wanmor	
2025
2025	**Future and Metro Boomin**	
2025	41	
2025	Common and Pete Rock	
2025	Drake and PartyNextDoor	
2025	FLO	
2025	Jacquees and Dej Loaf	
2025	Larry June, 2 Chainz and The Alchemist	
2025	Maverick City Music	
2026
2026	**Clipse**	
2026	41	
2026	De La Soul	
2026	FLO	
2026	French Montana and Max B	
2026	Metro Boomin and DJ Spinz	
2026	Nas and DJ Premier	
2026	Terrace Martin and Kenyon Dixon	
2026	Wizkid and Asake	

== Multiple wins and nominations ==
=== Wins ===
4 wins

- Migos

3 wins

- Outkast

2 wins

- Destiny's Child
- Drake
- Silk Sonic
- Young Money
- Kanye West

=== Nominations ===
8 nominations

- Quavo (including credit as Migos)
- Takeoff (including credit as Migos)

7 nominations

- Migos

6 nominations

- City Girls
- Lil Wayne (including credit as Young Money)

5 nominations

- Chloe x Halle
- Mary Mary

4 nominations

- 2 Chainz
- Destiny's Child
- FLO
- Outkast
- Rae Sremmurd

3 nominations

- 112
- 41
- Clipse
- Diddy – Dirty Money
- Drake
- Floetry
- Jagged Edge
- Maverick City Music
- Metro Boomin
- The Roots
- Three 6 Mafia
- Kanye West
- Young Money

2 nominations

- 21 Savage
- A$AP Mob
- A Tribe Called Quest
- B2K
- The Black Eyed Peas
- Day26
- Fat Joe
- Future
- Gnarls Barkley
- Lil Baby
- Lil' Jon & The Eastside Boyz
- Macklemore and Ryan Lewis
- Mindless Behavior
- N.E.R.D.
- New Boyz
- Silk Sonic
- The Throne
- Wanmor
