= BET Awards 2018 =

American entertainment awards ceremony

2018 BET Awards
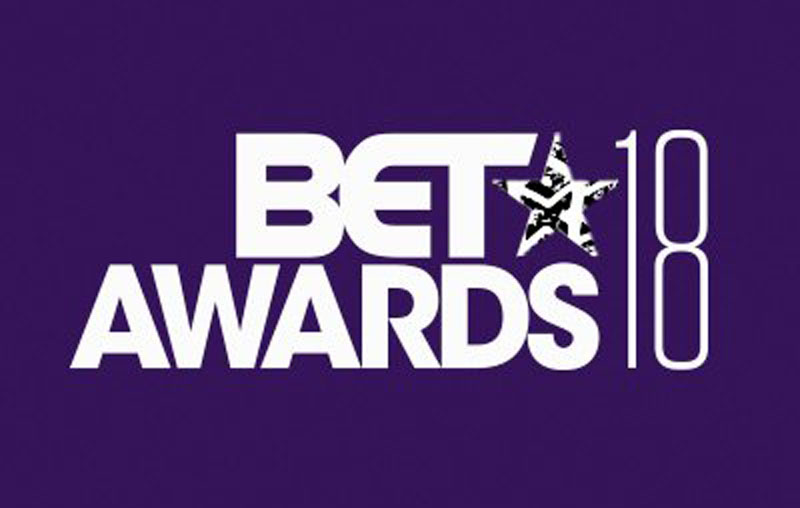
- Date: June 24, 2018
- Location: Microsoft Theater, Los Angeles, California
- Presented by: Black Entertainment Television
- Hosted by: Jamie Foxx

Highlights
- Most awards: Cardi B and Kendrick Lamar (2 each)
- Most nominations: DJ Khaled and Kendrick Lamar (6 each)
- Website: www.bet.com/shows/bet-awards.html

Television/radio coverage
- Network: BET; BET Her; MTV; VH1

The 18th BET Awards were held at Microsoft Theater in Los Angeles, California, on June 24, 2018. The ceremony celebrated achievements in entertainment and honored music, sports, television, and movies released between April 1, 2017, and March 31, 2018.

On May 22, 2018, it was announced that the ceremony would be hosted by Jamie Foxx for the second time. DJ Khaled and Kendrick Lamar were the most nominated act, with six nominations. SZA with four nominations was the most nominated female artist of the ceremony.

== Performers ==
Artist(s)	Song(s)
Main show
Jay Rock	"Win"
J. Cole; Daniel Caesar; Wale	"Intro" "Friends"
Migos	"Walk It Talk It" "Stir Fry"
Miguel	"Come Through and Chill" "Sky Walker"
SiR	"War"
Nicki Minaj; YG; 2 Chainz; Big Sean	"Chun-Li" "Rich Sex" "Big Bank"
H.E.R. Daniel Caesar	"Focus" "Best Part"
Marsha Ambrosius; Ledisi; Yolanda Adams	Tribute to Anita Baker "Caught Up in the Rapture" "Sweet Love" "You Bring Me Joy"
Meek Mill; Miguel	"Stay Woke"
Ella Mai	"Boo'd Up"
Janelle Monáe	"Django Jane" "I Like That"
Snoop Dogg	"What's My Name (Who Am I?)" "The Next Episode"
Snoop Dogg; Sly Pyper; Tye Tribbett	"Sunrise" "You"

== Presenters ==
The first wave of presenters were announced on June 11, with the second wave announced on June 14.

- Kevin Hart
- LL Cool J
- Yvonne Orji
- Jason Mitchell
- Chloe x Halle
- Bobby Brown
- Trevor Jackson
- Jacob Latimore
- T.I.
- Gabrielle Dennis
- Woody McClain
- Mike Colter
- Amandla Stenberg
- Tyler Perry
- Regina Hall
- Omari Hardwick
- Tika Sumpter
- SZA

== Nominations ==
Winners highlighted in Bold

Album of the Year	Video of the Year
**Damn – Kendrick Lamar**; 4:44 – Jay-Z; Black Panther: The Album – Kendrick Lamar & Various artists; Ctrl – SZA; Culture II – Migos; Grateful – DJ Khaled	**Drake – "God's Plan"**; Bruno Mars featuring Cardi B – "Finesse (Remix)"; Cardi B – "Bodak Yellow"; DJ Khaled featuring Rihanna & Bryson Tiller – "Wild Thoughts"; Kendrick Lamar – "HUMBLE."; Migos featuring Drake - "Walk It Talk It"
Coca-Cola Viewers' Choice Award	Best Collaboration
**Cardi B – "Bodak Yellow"**; DJ Khaled featuring Rihanna & Bryson Tiller – "Wild Thoughts"; Drake – "God's Plan"; Kendrick Lamar – "HUMBLE."; Migos, Nicki Minaj & Cardi B – "MotorSport"; SZA featuring Travis Scott – "Love Galore"	**DJ Khaled featuring Rihanna & Bryson Tiller – "Wild Thoughts"**; Bruno Mars featuring Cardi B - "Finesse (Remix)"; Kendrick Lamar featuring Rihanna – "LOYALTY."; Cardi B featuring 21 Savage – "Bartier Cardi"; DJ Khaled featuring Jay-Z, Future, & Beyoncé – "Top Off"; French Montana featuring Swae Lee - "Unforgettable"
Best Female R&B/Pop Artist	Best Male R&B/Pop Artist
**Beyoncé**; H.E.R.; Kehlani; Rihanna; SZA	**Bruno Mars**; Chris Brown; Daniel Caesar; Khalid; The Weeknd
Best Female Hip Hop Artist	Best Male Hip Hop Artist
**Cardi B**; Dej Loaf; Nicki Minaj; Rapsody; Remy Ma	**Kendrick Lamar**; DJ Khaled; Drake; J. Cole; Jay-Z
Best Duo/Group	Best New Artist
**Migos**; N.E.R.D.; Rae Sremmurd; A Tribe Called Quest; Chloe x Halle	**SZA**; A Boogie wit da Hoodie; Daniel Caesar; GoldLink; H.E.R.
Dr. Bobby Jones Best Gospel/Inspirational Award	BET Her Award
**Lecrae featuring Tori Kelly – "I'll Find You"**; Marvin Sapp – "Close"; Ledisi & Kirk Franklin– "If You Don't Mind"; Snoop Dogg featuring B.Slade – "Words Are Few"; Tasha Cobbs Leonard featuring Nicki Minaj – "I'm Getting Ready"	**Mary J. Blige – "Strength of a Woman"**; Janelle Monáe – "Django Jane"; Remy Ma featuring Chris Brown – "Melanin Magic (Pretty Brown)"; Leikeli47 – "2nd Fiddle"; Lizzo – "Water Me"; Chloe x Halle – "The Kids Are Alright"
Video Director of the Year	Best Movie
**Ava DuVernay**; Benny Boom; Director X; Chris Brown; Dave Meyers	**Black Panther**; A Wrinkle in Time; Girls Trip; Mudbound; Detroit
Best Actress	Best Actor
**Tiffany Haddish**; Angela Bassett; Issa Rae; Taraji P. Henson; Lupita Nyong'o; Letitia Wright	**Chadwick Boseman**; Denzel Washington; Sterling K. Brown; Michael B. Jordan; Daniel Kaluuya; Donald Glover
YoungStars Award	Best International Act
**Yara Shahidi**; Caleb McLaughlin; Lonnie Chavis; Marsai Martin; Miles Brown; Ashton Tyler	**Davido (Nigeria)**; Stormzy (UK); Fally Ipupa (DR Congo); Cassper Nyovest (South Africa); Tiwa Savage (Nigeria); Niska (France); Distruction Boyz (South Africa); Sjava (South Africa); Stefflon Don (UK); J Hus (UK); Dadju (France); Booba (France)
Sportswoman of the Year	Sportsman of the Year
**Serena Williams**; Elana Meyers Taylor; Candace Parker; Skylar Diggins-Smith; Venus Williams	**LeBron James**; Dwyane Wade; Odell Beckham Jr.; Stephen Curry; Kevin Durant

== Special awards ==
- Lifetime Achievement Award: Anita Baker
- Humanitarian Award: Mamoudou Gassama (French)
- Ultimate Icon Award: Debra L. Lee
- Shine A Light Award: Brittnay Packnett
