= BET Award for Best New Artist =

American entertainment award category

BET Awards for Best New Artist
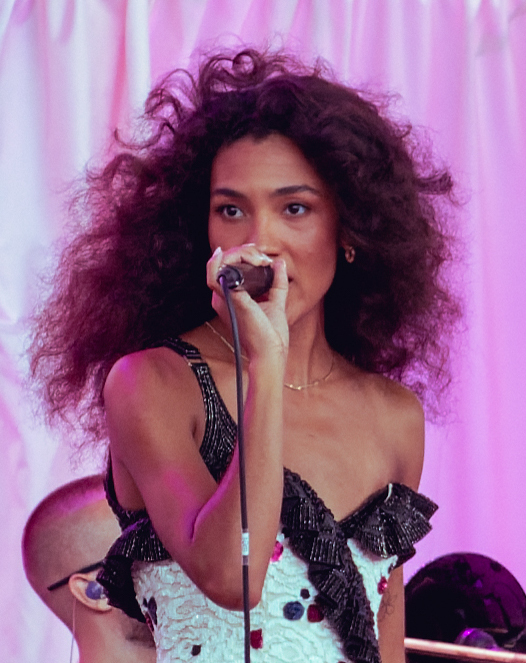
- Olivia Dean is the most recent recipient
- Country: United States
- Presented by: BET Awards
- First award: 2001
- Currently held by: Olivia Dean (2026)

The BET Award for Best New Artist is given to an artist who made their debut the previous or same year of the awards ceremony. A former group member can be nominated for the award if they have made their solo debut. Controversy arose when Jennifer Hudson won the award in 2007 even though her only solo release at the time was a single of "And I Am Telling You I'm Not Going"; her first album was scheduled for release in October 2007. Sam Smith is so far the only Caucasian artist to have won the award, winning it in 2015.

== Winners and nominees ==
Winners are listed first and highlighted in bold.

- Grammy Award for Best New Artist winning artist – †
- Grammy Award for Best New Artist nominated artist – ‡

=== Award Milestone ===
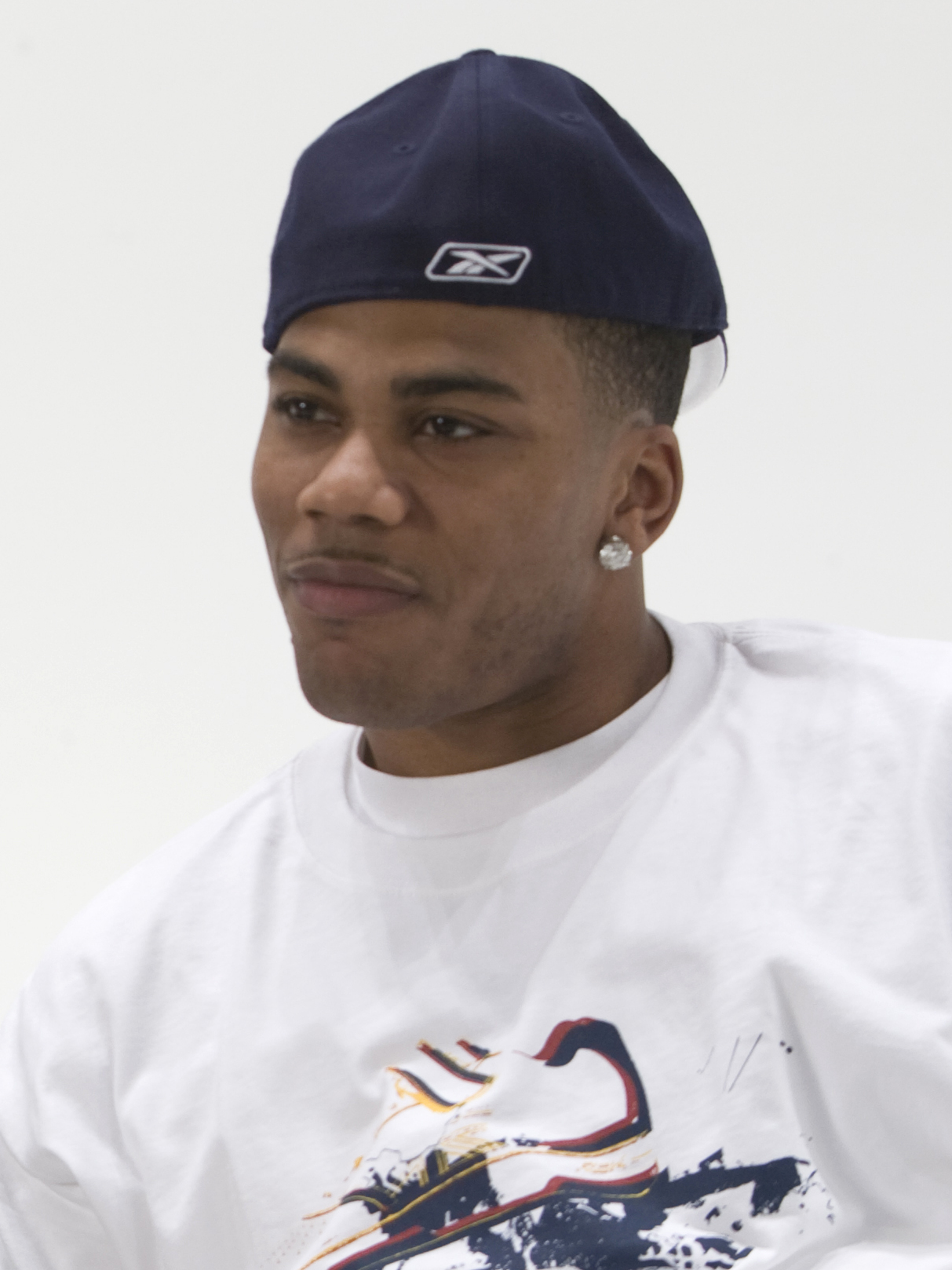

- Nelly became the Inaugural winner of this award in 2001
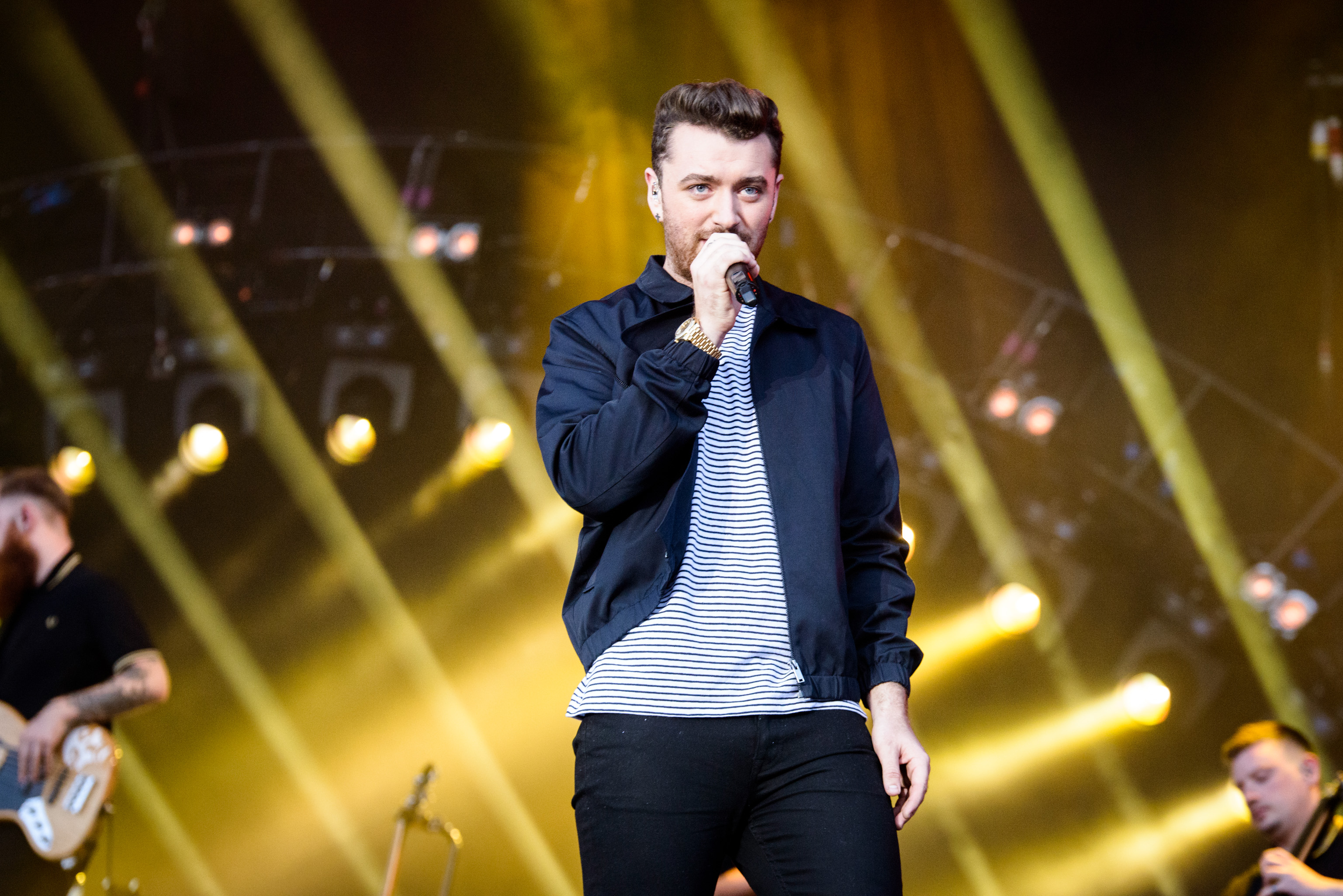

Sam Smith became the first and only non-black person to win the Award in 2015. They also became the first Non -American to Win this.

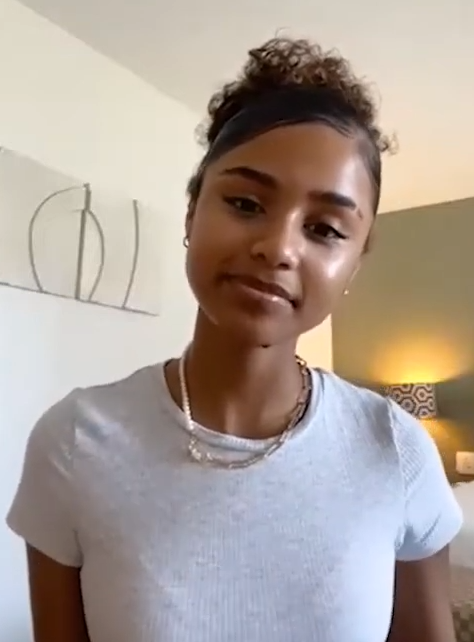

Tyla became the first African to win this award in 2024.

=== 2000s ===
Year	Artist	Ref
2001
2001	**Nelly**	
2001	India Arie ‡	
2001	Lil' Bow Wow	
2001	Musiq	
2001	Jill Scott ‡	
2002
2002	**Alicia Keys †**	
2002	Ashanti ‡	
2002	B2K	
2002	Craig David	
2002	Tweet	
2003
2003	**50 Cent ‡**	
2003	Floetry	
2003	Heather Headley ‡	
2003	Sean Paul ‡	
2003	Justin Timberlake	
2004
2004	**Kanye West ‡**	
2004	Chingy	
2004	Anthony Hamilton	
2004	Ruben Studdard	
2004	Pharrell Williams	
2005
2005	**John Legend †**	
2005	Ciara ‡	
2005	Fantasia	
2005	The Game	
2005	Omarion	
2006
2006	**Chris Brown ‡**	
2006	Chamillionaire	
2006	Ne-Yo	
2006	Rihanna	
2006	Paul Wall	
2007
2007	**Jennifer Hudson**	
2007	Corinne Bailey Rae ‡	
2007	Gnarls Barkley	
2007	Lupe Fiasco	
2007	Mims	
2008
2008	**The-Dream**	
2008	Estelle	
2008	Flo Rida	
2008	Chrisette Michele	
2008	Soulja Boy	
2009
2009	**Keri Hilson ‡**	
2009	Kid Cudi	
2009	Ryan Leslie	
2009	M.I.A.	
2009	Jazmine Sullivan ‡	

=== 2010s ===
Year	Artist	Ref
2010
2010	**Nicki Minaj ‡**	
2010	Justin Bieber ‡	
2010	Melanie Fiona	
2010	Wale	
2010	Young Money	
2011
2011	**Wiz Khalifa**	
2011	J. Cole ‡	
2011	Bruno Mars	
2011	Miguel	
2011	Willow Smith	
2012
2012	**Big Sean**	
2012	ASAP Rocky	
2012	Diggy	
2012	Future	
2012	Meek Mill	
2013
2013	**Kendrick Lamar ‡**	
2013	Joey Badass	
2013	Azealia Banks	
2013	Trinidad James	
2013	The Weeknd	
2014
2014	**August Alsina**	
2014	Ariana Grande	
2014	Rich Homie Quan	
2014	ScHoolboy Q	
2014	Mack Wilds	
2015
2015	**Sam Smith †**	
2015	Dej Loaf	
2015	Fetty Wap	
2015	Bobby Shmurda	
2015	Rae Sremmurd	
2015	Tinashe	
2016
2016	**Bryson Tiller**	
2016	Alessia Cara †	
2016	Andra Day	
2016	Kehlani	
2016	Tory Lanez	
2017
2017	**Chance the Rapper †**	
2017	21 Savage	
2017	Cardi B	
2017	Khalid ‡	
2017	Young M.A	
2018		
2018	**SZA ‡**	
2018	GoldLink	
2018	A Boogie wit da Hoodie	
2018	H.E.R. ‡	
2018	Daniel Caesar	
2019
2019	**Lil Baby**	
2019	Blueface	
2019	City Girls	
2019	Juice Wrld	
2019	Queen Naija	

=== 2020s ===
Year	Artist	Ref
2020
2020	**Roddy Ricch**	
2020	DaniLeigh	
2020	Lil Nas X ‡	
2020	Pop Smoke	
2020	Summer Walker	
2020	YBN Cordae	
2021
2021	**Giveon**	
2021	Coi Leray	
2021	Flo Milli	
2021	Jack Harlow	
2021	Latto ‡	
2021	Pooh Shiesty	
2022
2022	**Latto** ‡	
2022	Baby Keem ‡	
2022	Benny the Butcher	
2022	Bleu	
2022	Muni Long ‡	
2022	Tems	
2023
2023	**Coco Jones** ‡	
2023	Ambré	
2023	Doechii ‡	
2023	FLO	
2023	GloRilla	
2023	Ice Spice ‡	
2023	Lola Brooke	
2024
2024	**Tyla**	
2024	41	
2024	4Batz	
2024	Ayra Starr	
2024	BossMan Dlow	
2024	Fridayy	
2024	October London	
2024	Sexyy Red	
2025
2025	**Leon Thomas** ‡	
2025	Ayra Starr	
2025	BigXthaPlug	
2025	BossMan Dlow	
2025	Dee Billz	
2025	41	
2025	October London	
2025	Shaboozey ‡	
2025	Teddy Swims ‡	
2026
2026	**Olivia Dean** †	
2026	Belly Gang Kushington	
2026	Destin Conrad	
2026	Jaydon	
2026	Kwn	
2026	Miles Minnick	
2026	Monaleo	
2026	Raye ‡	
2026	Trap Dickey	
