= BET Awards =

American entertainment awards show

- Current: BET Awards 2026
- A BET Award from 2018
- Awarded for: Outstanding achievements in the entertainment industry
- Country: United States
- Presented by: BET
- First award: June 19, 2001; 25 years ago
- Website: http://www.bet.com/shows/bet-awards.html

The BET Awards are an American award show that was established in 2001, by the Black Entertainment Television network to celebrate Black entertainers and other minorities in music, film, sports and philanthropy. The awards, which are presented annually, are broadcast live on BET. The annual presentation ceremony features performances by artists; some of the awards with a higher profile are presented in a televised ceremony.

== Trophy ==
The award trophy, inspired by three words (aspire, ascend, achieve), was designed by artist/sculptor Carlos "Mare139" Rodriguez. Outkast won the first award trophy during the first ceremony in 2001. In 2007, Society Awards, the New York firm who manufactures the award, enhanced the quality of the trophy design using plated steel and black crystal.

== List of ceremonies ==
The inaugural ceremony was held at the Paris Las Vegas resort on the Las Vegas Strip in 2001. From 2002 to 2005, the Kodak Theatre in Hollywood hosted the awards. From 2006 to 2012, the ceremonies were held at the Shrine Auditorium in Los Angeles. Since 2013, the ceremony has been held at the Peacock Theater at L.A. Live (previously Nokia Theatre and Microsoft Theater).

Most recent BET Awards winners
- June 28, 2026
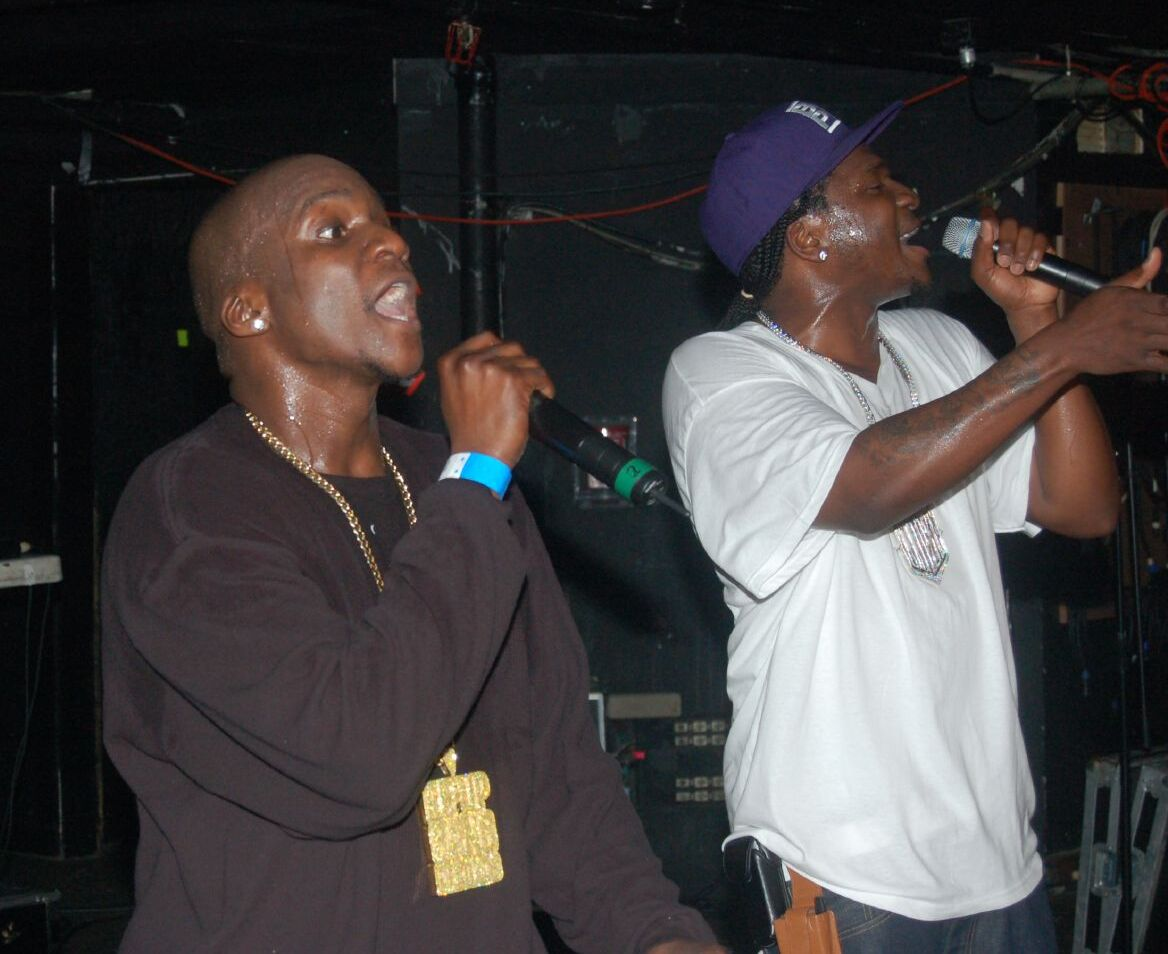

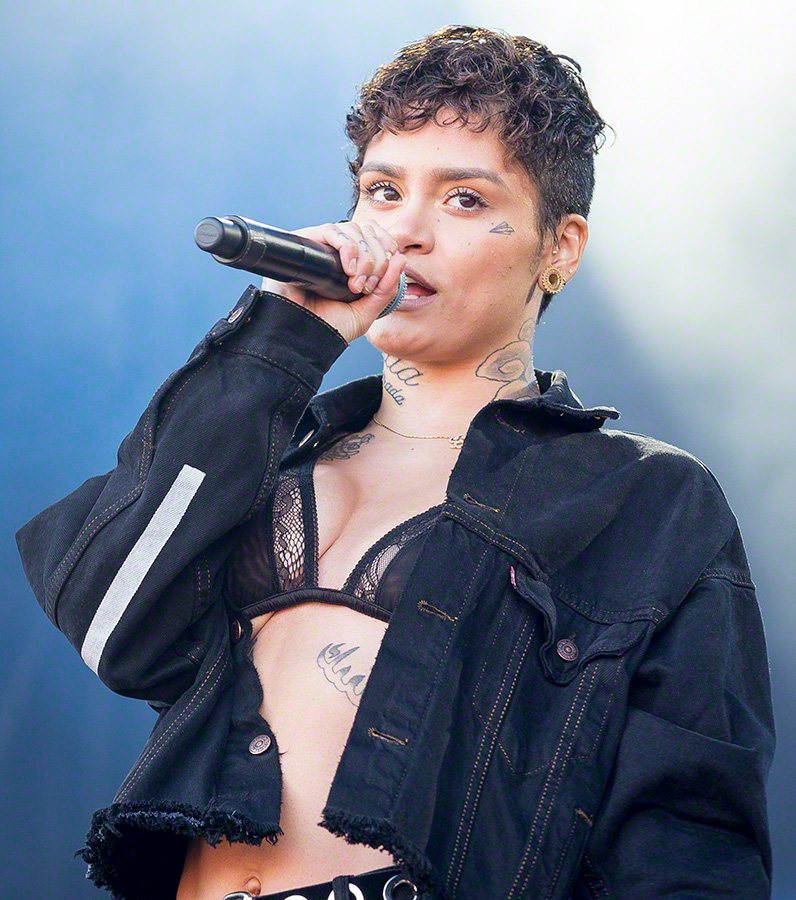

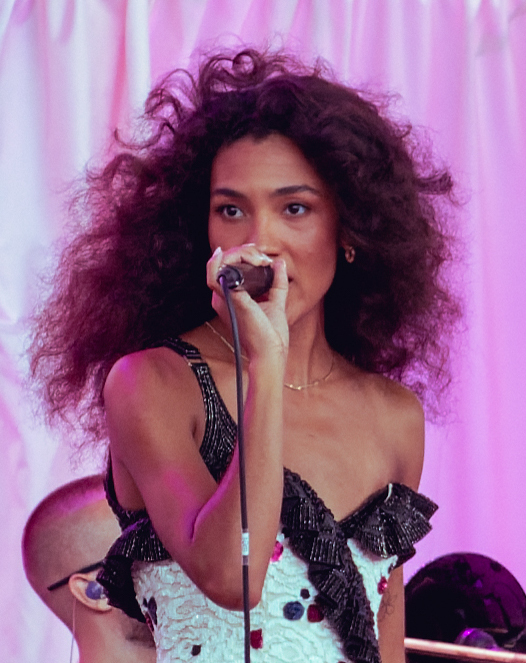

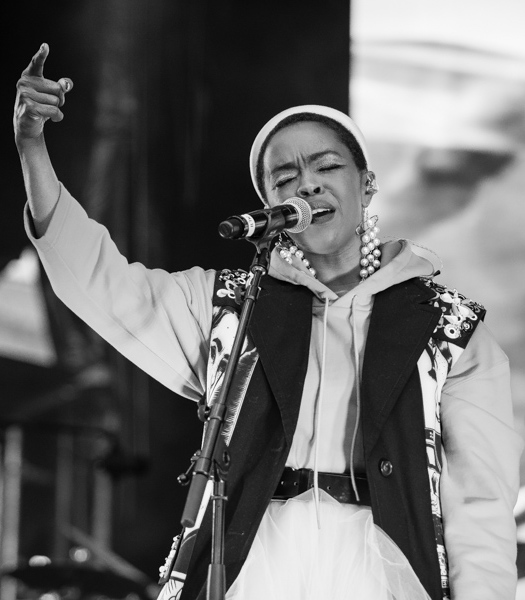
Award	Album of the Year	Video of the Year
Winner	Clipse; Let God Sort Em Out	Kehlani "Folded"
Award	Best New Artist	Living Legend Icon Award
Winner	Olivia Dean	Lauryn Hill

#	Date	Venue	Host city	Host
1st	June 19, 2001	Paris Las Vegas	Las Vegas	Steve Harvey and Cedric the Entertainer
2nd	June 25, 2002	Kodak Theatre	Los Angeles	Steve Harvey and Cedric the Entertainer
3rd	June 24, 2003	Kodak Theatre	Los Angeles	Mo'Nique
4th	June 29, 2004	Kodak Theatre	Los Angeles	Mo'Nique
5th	June 28, 2005	Kodak Theatre	Los Angeles	Will Smith and Jada Pinkett Smith
6th	June 27, 2006	Shrine Auditorium	Los Angeles	Damon Wayans
7th	June 26, 2007	Shrine Auditorium	Los Angeles	Mo'Nique
8th	June 24, 2008	Shrine Auditorium	Los Angeles	D. L. Hughley
9th	June 28, 2009	Shrine Auditorium	Los Angeles	Jamie Foxx
10th	June 27, 2010	Shrine Auditorium	Los Angeles	Queen Latifah
11th	June 26, 2011	Shrine Auditorium	Los Angeles	Kevin Hart
12th	July 1, 2012	Shrine Auditorium	Los Angeles	Samuel L. Jackson
13th	June 30, 2013	Nokia Theatre/ Microsoft Theater	Los Angeles	Chris Tucker
14th	June 29, 2014	Nokia Theatre/ Microsoft Theater	Los Angeles	Chris Rock
15th	June 28, 2015	Nokia Theatre/ Microsoft Theater	Los Angeles	Anthony Anderson and Tracee Ellis Ross
16th	June 26, 2016	Nokia Theatre/ Microsoft Theater	Los Angeles	Anthony Anderson and Tracee Ellis Ross
17th	June 25, 2017	Nokia Theatre/ Microsoft Theater	Los Angeles	Leslie Jones
18th	June 24, 2018	Nokia Theatre/ Microsoft Theater	Los Angeles	Jamie Foxx
19th	June 23, 2019	Nokia Theatre/ Microsoft Theater	Los Angeles	Regina Hall
20th	June 28, 2020	Virtual show		Amanda Seales
21st	June 27, 2021	Microsoft Theater/ Peacock Theater	Los Angeles	Taraji P. Henson
22nd	June 26, 2022	Microsoft Theater/ Peacock Theater	Los Angeles	Taraji P. Henson
23rd	June 25, 2023	Microsoft Theater/ Peacock Theater	Los Angeles	—N/a
24th	June 30, 2024	Microsoft Theater/ Peacock Theater	Los Angeles	Taraji P. Henson
25th	June 9, 2025	Microsoft Theater/ Peacock Theater	Los Angeles	Kevin Hart
26th	June 28, 2026	Microsoft Theater/ Peacock Theater	Los Angeles	Druski

== Ratings ==
Year	Day	Date	BET			Cumulative		Ref.
Year	Day	Date	Household rating	18–49 rating	Viewers (in millions)	18–49 rating	Viewers (in millions)	Ref.
2001	Tuesday	June 19	4.3	Unknown	5.20	No simulcast		
2002	Tuesday	June 25	4.0	Unknown	4.40	No simulcast		
2003	Tuesday	June 24	4.3	Unknown	5.50	No simulcast		
2004	Tuesday	June 29	3.4	Unknown	5.60	No simulcast		
2005	Tuesday	June 28	3.7	Unknown	6.58	No simulcast		
2006	Tuesday	June 27	4.9	Unknown	6.60	No simulcast		
2007	Tuesday	June 26	3.4	Unknown	6.39	No simulcast		
2008	Tuesday	June 24	3.2	Unknown	5.85	No simulcast		
2009	Sunday	June 28	Unknown	Unknown	10.65	No simulcast		
2010	Sunday	June 27	Unknown	Unknown	7.40	No simulcast		
2011	Sunday	June 26	Unknown	3.3	7.71	No simulcast		
2012	Sunday	July 1	Unknown	3.2	7.42	No simulcast		
2013	Sunday	June 30	Unknown	3.4	7.77	No simulcast		
2014	Sunday	June 29	Unknown	3.1	7.50	Unknown	7.90	
2015	Sunday	June 28	Unknown	2.6	6.27	Unknown	6.50	
2016	Sunday	June 26	Unknown	1.9	4.50	4.3	7.20	
2017	Sunday	June 25	Unknown	1.5	3.83	3.5	5.80	
2018	Sunday	June 24	Unknown	1.2	2.87	1.8	4.30	
2019	Sunday	June 23	1.4	1.0	2.43	1.5	3.79	
2020	Sunday	June 28	Unknown	Unknown	1.6	1.0	3.7	
2021	Sunday	June 27	Unknown	Unknown	1.7	Unknown	2.4	

== Nomination process ==
The nomination process is provided by a voting academy consisting of about 500 people from the music industry, involving the media, and bloggers. BET sends ballots electronically and voters nominate deserving works and artists in all categories who they think should be nominated. Nominations and voting ballots are collated by Yangaroo, Inc., a leading digital distribution firm that works on many other televised award ceremonies, including those of BET's sister networks under parent company Paramount Skydance. The top nominees are determined in each category, and the winners are selected via the academy members' voting process.

== Award categories ==
=== Current awards ===
Music

- Album of the Year (2017–present)
- Video of the Year (2001–present)
- Viewer's Choice Award (2001–present)
- Best Group (2001–present)
- Best Collaboration (2003–present)
- Best Female Hip-Hop Artist (2001–2006, 2008–present)
- Best Male Hip-Hop Artist (2001–present)
- Best Female R&B/Pop Artist (2001–present)
- Best Male R&B/Pop Artist (2001–present)
- Best New Artist (2001–present)
- Dr. Bobby Jones Best Gospel/Inspirational Award (2001–present)
- BET Her Award (2018–present)
- Best International Act (2010, 2018–present)
- Best New International Act (2019–present)

Film

- Best Movie (2010–present)
- Best Actress (2001–present)
- Best Actor (2001–present)

Sports

- Sportswoman of the Year (2001–present)
- Sportsman of the Year (2001–present)

Miscellaneous

- Video Director of the Year (2008–present)
- YoungStars Award (2010–present)
- Fashion Vanguard Award (2026–present)
- Pulse Award (2026–present)

=== Defunct awards ===
- Best Actor & Actress of the Year
- Best Gospel Artist (2001–2016)
- J Cool Like That Award (2006–2007)
- J Award (2008–2009)
- Centric Award (2010–2017)
- Best International Act: Africa (2011–2017)
- Best International Act: UK (2011–2016)
- FANdemonium Award (2010–2016)
- International Viewers' Choice Award (2015–2017)
- Best International Act: Europe (2017)

=== Special awards ===
The BET Lifetime Achievement, Humanitarian, Ultimate Icon, Living Legend Icon and Icon of the Year Award recipients, along with the nominees for other categories, are announced in a press release. At the awards ceremony, a mini-documentary is shown covering the honorees' career. The awards are presented separately.

Lifetime Achievement

The BET Lifetime Achievement Award is given a veteran artist or group who has made notable contributions to the music industry. The honoree is paid tribute by singers who perform the honoree's most recognized songs. The honoree would usually perform themselves after being paid tribute.

- 2001: Whitney Houston
- 2002: Earth Wind & Fire
- 2003: James Brown
- 2004: The Isley Brothers
- 2005: Gladys Knight
- 2006: Chaka Khan
- 2007: Diana Ross
- 2008: Al Green
- 2009: The O'Jays
- 2010: Prince
- 2011: Patti LaBelle
- 2012: Maze Featuring Frankie Beverly
- 2013: Charlie Wilson
- 2014: Lionel Richie
- 2015: Smokey Robinson
- 2016: Samuel L. Jackson
- 2017: New Edition
- 2018: Anita Baker
- 2019: Mary J. Blige
- 2021: Queen Latifah
- 2022: Sean Combs
- 2023: Busta Rhymes
- 2024: Usher

Humanitarian

In 2002, the BET Award Humanitarian Award was created. The Humanitarian Award is given to a celebrity philanthropist who donates their time and money to a charitable cause.

- 2002: Muhammad Ali
- 2003: Earvin "Magic" Johnson
- 2004: Danny Glover
- 2005: Denzel Washington and Pauletta Washington
- 2006: Harry Belafonte
- 2007: Don Cheadle
- 2008: Quincy Jones
- 2009: Alicia Keys and Wyclef Jean
- 2010: John Legend
- 2011: Steve Harvey
- 2012: Al Sharpton
- 2013: Dwyane Wade
- 2014: Myrlie Evers-Williams
- 2015: Tom Joyner
- 2016: Jesse Williams
- 2017: Chance the Rapper
- 2018: Naomi Wadler, Mamoudou Gassama, Justin Blackman, Shaun King, Anthony Borges and James Shaw Jr.
- 2019: Nipsey Hussle
- 2020: Beyoncé

Ultimate Icon

In 2015, the Ultimate Icon Award was created. It is given to a veteran artist whose career is considered iconic by the public for their notable contributions in the music, dance and music video fields.

- 2015: Janet Jackson
- 2018: Debra L. Lee
- 2019: Tyler Perry
- 2025: Mariah Carey, Jamie Foxx, Snoop Dogg and Kirk Franklin
- 2026: Sylvia Rhone

Living Legend Icon

- 2026: Lauryn Hill

Icon of the Year

- 2026: Teyana Taylor

== Most nominated and winning artists ==
Below are the current rankings for the most wins and most nominated artist:

Most wins (as of 2024)

Rank	1st	2nd	3rd	4th	5th
Artist	Beyoncé	Kendrick Lamar	Chris Brown	Drake	Serena Williams
Total wins	36 (with Destiny's Child and The Carters)	29	21	15	13

Most nominations (as of 2025)

The following lists multiple nominated performers, athletes and actors with five or more career nominations. Beyoncé is currently the most nominated performer with 102 nominations, solo and with Destiny's Child.

102 nominations (as of 2025)

- Beyoncé (73 solo; 8 with Destiny's Child)

65 nominations

- Chris Brown

51 nominations

- Drake (46 solo; 5 with Young Money)

37 nominations

- Nicki Minaj (33 solo; 4 with Young Money)

35 nominations

- Jay Z (30 solo; 5 with Watch The Throne)

33 nominations

- Lil Wayne (28 solo; 5 with Young Money)

31 nominations

- Kanye West (26 solo; 5 with Watch The Throne)

23 nominations

- Rihanna

21 nominations

- Kendrick Lamar

19 nominations

- Usher

18 nominations

- Missy Elliott

17 nominations

- Serena Williams
- The Weeknd

16 nominations

- Bruno Mars
- Venus Williams

15 nominations

- Alicia Keys
- T.I.

14 nominations

- Jamie Foxx
- Ludacris
- Mary J. Blige

13 nominations

- Erica Campbell (2 solo; 11 with Mary Mary)
- H.E.R.
- SZA

12 nominations

- Common
- Pharrell Williams (10 solo; 2 with N.E.R.D.)

11 nominations

- Big Boi (1 solo; 10 with Outkast)
- Ciara
- LeBron James
- Mary Mary
- Snoop Dogg

10 nominations

- Kobe Bryant
- T-Pain
- Outkast
- Trina
- Trey Songz
- Tyga (6 solo; 4 with Young Money)

9 nominations

- Denzel Washington
- Doja Cat
- Jazmine Sullivan
- Kelly Rowland (1 solo; 8 with Destiny's Child)
- Michelle Williams (1 solo; 8 with Destiny's Child)
- Taraji P. Henson

8 nominations

- 2 Chainz
- 50 Cent
- Angela Bassett
- ASAP Rocky (6 solo; 2 with ASAP Mob)
- Benny Boom
- Big Sean
- Busta Rhymes
- Chloe x Halle
- Destiny's Child
- Diddy (5 solo; 3 with Diddy – Dirty Money)
- Hype Williams
- Idris Elba
- John Legend
- Marsha Ambrosius (4 solo; 4 with Floetry)
- Miguel
- Omarion (2 solo; 6 with B2K)
- Justin Timberlake
- Rick Ross

7 nominations

- Don Cheadle
- Erykah Badu
- Halle Berry
- Jennifer Hudson
- Keyshia Cole
- Kirk Franklin
- Mariah Carey
- Ne-Yo
- R. Kelly

6 nominations

- Aaliyah
- Anthony Hamilton
- August Alsina
- B.o.B
- B2K
- Benny Boom
- CeeLo Green (2 solo; 4 with Gnarls Barkley)
- Keri Hilson
- Lil Jon (3 solo; 3 with Lil' Jon and the Eastside Boyz)
- Lil' Kim
- Musiq Soulchild
- Samuel L. Jackson
- Wale
- Yolanda Adams

5 nominations

- Bow Wow
- Carmelo Anthony
- Donnie McClurkin
- Eminem
- Eve
- Fantasia
- Gabrielle Union
- Jhené Aiko
- Jill Scott
- Keke Palmer
- Melanie Fiona
- Mindless Behavior
- Nelly
- Pusha T (3 solo; 2 with The Clipse)
- Regina King
- Solange Knowles
- Willow Smith

== See also ==
- BET Hip Hop Awards
