= BET Awards 2009 =

American entertainment awards ceremony

9th BET Awards
- Date: June 28, 2009
- Location: Shrine Auditorium, Los Angeles, California
- Presented by: Black Entertainment Television
- Hosted by: Jamie Foxx

Television/radio coverage
- Network: BET

The 9th BET Awards took place at the Shrine Auditorium in Los Angeles, California on June 28, 2009. The awards recognized Americans in music, acting, sports, and other fields of entertainment over the past year. Comedian, singer, actor Jamie Foxx hosted the event for the first time, which was watched by 10.7 million viewers; the largest audience BET has ever received.

== Winners and nominees ==
The nominations were announced May 12, 2009 during 106 & Park's 2009 BET Award Nominations Special.

Best Male R&B Artist	Best Female R&B Artist
Ne-Yo; The-Dream; Jamie Foxx; Ryan Leslie; T-Pain	Beyoncé; Keyshia Cole; Keri Hilson; Jennifer Hudson; Jazmine Sullivan
Best Group	Best Collaboration
Day26; GS Boyz; N.E.R.D; The Roots; Three 6 Mafia	Jamie Foxx feat. T-Pain – "Blame It"; Keri Hilson feat. Lil Wayne – "Turnin Me On"; Jim Jones feat. Ron Browz and Juelz Santana – "Pop Champagne"; T.I. feat. Rihanna – "Live Your Life"; Yung L.A. feat. Young Dro and T.I. – "Ain't I"
Best Male Hip Hop Artist	Best Female Hip Hop Artist
Lil Wayne; Rick Ross; T.I.; Kanye West; Young Jeezy	M.I.A.; Lil Mama; Trina
Video of the Year	Video Director of the Year
Beyoncé – "Single Ladies (Put a Ring on It); Beyoncé - "If I Were a Boy"; Jamie Foxx feat. T-Pain – "Blame It"; T.I. feat. Rihanna – "Live Your Life"; Kanye West – "Heartless"	Benny Boom; Rik Cordero; Gil Green; Chris Robinson; Hype Williams
Best New Artist	Best Gospel
Keri Hilson; Kid Cudi; Ryan Leslie; M.I.A.; Jazmine Sullivan	Mary Mary; Regina Belle; Shirley Caesar; Smokie Norful; Trin-i-tee 5:7
Best Actor	Best Actress
Will Smith; Jamal Woolard; Common; Samuel L. Jackson; Idris Elba	Taraji P. Henson; Jennifer Hudson; Beyoncé Knowles; Angela Bassett; Rosario Dawson
Sportsman of the Year	Sportswoman of the Year
LeBron James; Kobe Bryant; Reggie Bush; Dwyane Wade; Tiger Woods	Serena Williams; Tamika Catchings; Lisa Leslie; Candace Parker; Venus Williams
Viewer's Choice	J Award
T.I. feat. Rihanna – "Live Your Life"; Keri Hilson feat. Lil Wayne – "Turnin' Me On"; Lil Wayne – "A Milli"; Soulja Boy Tell'em feat. Sammie – "Kiss Me Thru the Phone"; Beyoncé – "Single Ladies (Put a Ring On It)"; T-Pain feat. Lil Wayne – "Can't Believe It"; Kanye West – "Love Lockdown"	Jazmine Sullivan; Solange Knowles; Seal; Raphael Saadiq; Musiq Soulchild
Lifetime Achievement Award	Humanitarian Award
The O'Jays	Alicia Keys; Wyclef Jean

== Michael Jackson tribute ==
On June 25, 2009, American recording artist and entertainer Michael Jackson died due to cardiac arrest just three days before the award ceremony aired. In honor of Jackson, BET announced, through their website, that the awards show would be changed to honor Jackson's contributions.

The ceremony began with R&B group New Edition performing a mash up of Jackson 5 hits, including ABC, which gained a standing ovation from the entire audience. Throughout the event, various artists performed covers of Jackson's hit singles, such as Ne-Yo's take on "The Lady in My Life", Ciara's cover of "Heal the World", and Keke Palmer's a cappella version of "Who's Loving You". In addition, many award winners thanked Jackson in their acceptance speeches, such as Lil Wayne, Beyoncé, and Jamie Foxx, who stated, "We want to celebrate this black man. He belongs to us and we shared him with everyone else." Foxx also paid homage by changing into multiple Michael Jackson-inspired outfits, like Jackson's silver glove and red Thriller jacket.

Towards the end of the night, Jackson's younger sister, Janet Jackson, made an emotional, surprise appearance, stating, "To you, Michael is an icon. To us, Michael is family and he will forever live in all of our hearts [...] On behalf of my family and myself, thank you for all of your love, thank you for all of your support. We miss him so much, thank you so much."
