= BET Awards 2003 =

American entertainment awards ceremony

3rd BET Awards
- Date: June 24, 2003
- Location: Kodak Theatre, Los Angeles, California
- Presented by: Black Entertainment Television
- Hosted by: Mo'Nique

Television/radio coverage
- Network: BET

The 3rd BET Awards took place at the Kodak Theatre in Los Angeles, California on June 24, 2003. The awards recognized Americans in music, acting, sports, and other fields of entertainment over the past year. Comedian Mo'Nique hosted the event for the first time.

== Performances ==
- Missy Elliott and 50 Cent - "Work It (Remix)"
- 50 Cent and G-Unit - "P.I.M.P." / "21 Questions" with Nate Dogg
- B2K - "Bump, Bump, Bump" / "Girlfriend"
- Donnie McClurkin and Yolanda Adams - "The Prayer"
- Snoop Dogg and Pharrell - "Beautiful"
- Beyoncé and Jay-Z- "Crazy in Love"
- James Brown - Lifetime Achievement Award performance: "It's a Man's Man's Man's World" / "Get Up (I Feel Like Being a) Sex Machine"
- Lil' Kim - "The Jump Off" / "Magic Stick"
- Jam Master Jay Tribute by DJ Premier, Grandmaster Flash, Kid Capri & DJ Jazzy Jeff
- Ashanti - "Rock wit U (Awww Baby)" / "Rock with You"
- R. Kelly with Big Tigger- "Ignition (Remix)"

One notable performance was a surprise performance by rock band Alien Ant Farm, who crashed the event to perform their song, "These Days", atop the Hollywood Masonic Temple. The band was arrested at the site and later dismissed by local authorities. The performance was used for the song’s music video.

== Presenters ==
- Stevie Wonder - Best New Artist
- Lil Kim - Best Male Athlete
- LisaRaye, Marques Houston, & Latoya Jackson - Best Group
- Kristoff St. John, Victoria Rowell, Duane Martin, & Elise Neal - Best Collaboration
- Butch Lewis - Introduced a video montage of James Brown
- Steve Harvey - Introduced James Brown
- Michael Jackson - Presented James Brown the Lifetime Achievement Award
- Vivica A. Fox & Leon Robinson - Best Female Athlete
- Nelly, Ludacris, & Wanda Sykes - Best Female Hip-Hop Artist
- Rakim & Birdman - Best Female R&B Artist
- Nick Cannon, Monica, Meagan Good - Best Gospel Artist
- Tyrese & Mya - Best Actress
- AJ Calloway, Free - Presented Viewer's Choice
- Bow Wow & Cedric the Entertainer - Presented a video montage to Magic Johnson
- Robert L. Johnson - Presented Magic Johnson the Humanitarian Award
- Ruben Studdard & Brian McKnight - Best Male R&B Artist
- Mary J. Blige and P. Diddy - presented Video of the Year
- Tommy Lister & Tony Cox - Appeared in the closing segment

== Awards and nominations ==
The winners are listed first and in bold.

Best Female R&B Artist	Best Male R&B Artist
**India Arie**; Amerie; Vivian Green; Heather Headley; Erykah Badu	**R. Kelly** and **Jaheim** (tie); Musiq Soulchild; Justin Timberlake; Ginuwine
Best Female Hip-Hop Artist	Best Male Hip-Hop Artist
**Missy Elliott**; Eve; Lil' Kim; Ms. Jade; Trina	**50 Cent**; Baby; Eminem; Jay Z; Nelly; Snoop Dogg
Best New Artist	Best Group
**50 Cent**; Floetry; Heather Headley; Sean Paul; Justin Timberlake	**B2K**; Clipse; Mary Mary; Floetry; The Roots
Best Gospel Artist	Best Actress
**Yolanda Adams**; Donnie McClurkin; Kirk Franklin; Tonéx; Smokie Norful	**Queen Latifah**; Gabrielle Union; Halle Berry; Nicole Ari Parker; Sanaa Lathan
Best Actor	Best Female Athlete of the Year
**Derek Luke**; Nick Cannon; Mos Def; Samuel L. Jackson; Denzel Washington	**Serena Williams**; Sheryl Swoopes; Lisa Leslie; Laila Ali; Venus Williams
Best Male Athlete of the Year	Video of the Year
**Kobe Bryant**; Tiger Woods; Barry Bonds; Allen Iverson; Tracy McGrady	**Erykah Badu for "Love of My Life (An Ode to Hip-Hop)" featuring Common**; B2K for "Girlfriend"; Missy Elliott for "Work It"; Eminem for "Lose Yourself"; Nelly for "Hot in Herre"
Viewer's Choice	Best Collaboration
**B2K for "Bump, Bump, Bump featuring P. Diddy**; 50 Cent for "In da Club"; R. Kelly for "Ignition (Remix)"; Missy Elliott for "Work It"; Erykah Badu for "Love of My Life (An Ode to Hip-Hop)" featuring Common	**Snoop Dogg for "Beautiful" featuring Pharrell Williams & Charlie Wilson**; Nelly for "Dilemma" featuring Kelly Rowland; Erykah Badu for "Love of My Life (An Ode to Hip-Hop)" featuring Common; Jay Z for "'03 Bonnie & Clyde" featuring Beyoncé; Missy Elliott for "Gossip Folks" featuring Ludacris & Ms. Jade
Lifetime Achievement Award	Humanitarian Award
**James Brown**	**Magic Johnson**
