= BET Awards 2016 =

American entertainment awards ceremony

16th BET Awards
- Date: June 26, 2016
- Location: Microsoft Theater; Los Angeles, California
- Presented by: Black Entertainment Television
- Hosted by: Anthony Anderson; Tracee Ellis Ross

Highlights
- Most awards: Beyoncé (5)
- Most nominations: Drake (9)
- Website: www.bet.com/shows/bet-awards.html

Television/radio coverage
- Network: BET & Centric Simulcast partners: Comedy Central; MTV; MTV2; Logo TV; Nick at Nite; Spike; TeenNick; VH1; VH1 Classic

The 16th BET Awards were held at the Microsoft Theater in Los Angeles, California on June 26, 2016. The ceremony celebrated mass achievements in black entertainment and honored music, sports, television, and motion pictures released between April 1, 2015 and March 30, 2016. The nominees were announced on Friday, May 20, 2016, with Drake leading the pack with 9 nominations, while Beyoncé and Rihanna both followed behind with 6. Beyoncé ended up winning the most awards with 5, including Video of the Year.

Beyoncé opened the show with a performance of "Freedom" with Kendrick Lamar. The act featured the 50+ foot long pool that is included in her set during The Formation World Tour, where she and her backup dancers perform the choreography barefoot. Another highlight from the show was the speech from actor and activist Jesse Williams, who spoke on topics such as racism and police brutality during his acceptance speech for the Humanitarian Award. However, the most anticipated moments of the night were the multiple tributes to Prince, who died in April 2016. Seven different performances paying homage to him were spread throughout the evening.

The awards ceremony was broadcast for the first time as a simulcast across 12 Viacom Media Networks properties. Outside of BET Networks operated channels BET & Centric, the show aired on the music based platforms of MTV & MTV2 and VH1 & VH1 Classic, Nickelodeon (first hour), Nick at Nite (final two hours), and TeenNick as well as general entertainment platforms of Comedy Central, Logo and Spike.

== Performances ==
Artist(s)	Song(s)
Beyoncé; Kendrick Lamar	"Freedom"
Bibi Bourelly	"Riot"
Desiigner	"Panda"
Erykah Badu; The Roots; Bilal	"The Ballad of Dorothy Parker" "The Beautiful Ones" (Tribute to Prince)
Fat Joe; Remy Ma; French Montana	"All The Way Up"
Alicia Keys	"In Common"
Stevie Wonder; Jennifer Hudson; Tori Kelly	"Take Me With U" "Purple Rain" (Tribute to Prince)
Chloe x Halle	"Drop"
Bryson Tiller	"Exchange "Don't"
Maxwell	"Lake by the Ocean" "Nothing Compares 2 U"" (Tribute to Prince)
Future	"Wicked"
Anderson Paak	"Come Down"
Janelle Monáe	"Delirious" "Kiss" "Pop Life" "I Would Die 4 U" (Tribute to Prince)
Usher; Young Thug	"No Limit"
Sheila E. with: Lynn Mabry; Liv Warfield; Elisa Fiorillo; Jerome Benton; Mayte Garcia	Finale Medley: "Housequake" "Erotic City" "U Got the Look" "A Love Bizarre" "The Glamorous Life" "America" "Baby I'm a Star" (Tribute to Prince)

== Nominations and Winners ==
The following is a list of winners and nominees. The nominations were announced on May 20, 2016.

Video of the Year	Video Director of the Year
Beyoncé – Formation; Bryson Tiller - "Don't"; Drake – "Hotline Bling"; Kendrick Lamar – "Alright"; Rihanna featuring Drake – "Work"	Benny Boom; Chris Brown; Colin Tilley; Director X; Hype Williams
Coca-Cola Viewers' Choice Award	Centric Award
Beyoncé – Formation; Bryson Tiller – "Don't"; Chris Brown – "Back to Sleep"; Drake – "Hotline Bling"; Future featuring Drake – "Where Ya At"; Rihanna featuring Drake – "Work"	Andra Day – "Rise Up"; Beyoncé – Formation; K. Michelle – "Not a Little Bit"; The Internet – "Under Control"; Rihanna – "Bitch Better Have My Money"
Best Female R&B/Pop Artist	Best Male R&B/Pop Artist
Adele; Andra Day; Beyoncé; K. Michelle; Rihanna	Bryson Tiller; Chris Brown; Jeremih; The Weeknd; Tyrese Gibson
Best Female Hip Hop Artist	Best Male Hip Hop Artist
Dej Loaf; Lil' Kim; Missy Elliott; Nicki Minaj; Remy Ma	Drake; Fetty Wap; Future; J. Cole; Kanye West; Kendrick Lamar
Best Group	Best Collaboration
2 Chainz & Lil Wayne; Drake & Future; Puff Daddy & The Family; Rae Sremmurd; The Internet	Big Sean featuring Chris Brown & Ty Dolla Sign – "Play No Games"; Big Sean featuring Kanye West & John Legend – "One Man Can Change the World"; Future featuring Drake – "Where Ya At"; Nicki Minaj featuring Beyoncé – "Feeling Myself"; Rihanna featuring Drake – "Work"
Best New Artist	Best Gospel Artist
Alessia Cara; Andra Day; Bryson Tiller; Kehlani; Tory Lanez	Anthony Brown & Group Therapy; Erica Atkins-Campbell; Kirk Franklin; Lecrae; Tamela Mann; Tasha Cobbs
Best Actress	Best Actor
Gabrielle Union; Kerry Washington; Taraji P. Henson; Tracee Ellis Ross; Viola Davis	Anthony Anderson; Courtney B. Vance; Idris Elba; Michael B. Jordan; O'Shea Jackson Jr.
YoungStars Award	Best Movie
Amandla Stenberg; Quvenzhané Wallis; Silentó; Willow Smith; Yara Shahidi	Beasts of No Nation; Concussion; Creed; Dope; Straight Outta Compton
Sportswoman of the Year	Sportsman of the Year
Cheyenne Woods; Gabrielle Douglas; Serena Williams; Skylar Diggins; Venus Williams	Cam Newton; Kobe Bryant; LeBron James; Odell Beckham Jr.; Stephen Curry
Best International Act: Africa	Best International Act: UK
AKA; Black Coffee; Cassper Nyovest; Diamond Platnumz; MzVee; Serge Beynaud; Wizkid; Yemi Alade	Kano; Krept and Konan; Lianne La Havas; Skepta; Stormzy
Viewer's Choice Best New International Act	FANdemonium Award
Falz (Nigeria); Emtee (South Africa); MHD (France); Section Boyz (UK); Tkay Maidza (Australia); WSTRN (UK)	Beyoncé; Rihanna; Drake; Bryson Tiller; Ruth B

== Special awards ==
- Lifetime Achievement Award - Samuel L. Jackson
- Humanitarian Award - Jesse Williams

== Controversy ==
Jesse Williams's humanitarian award speech was the subject of backlash from some Grey's Anatomy fans. The show's fans made a Change.org petition. The petition says that Williams "spewed a racist, hate speech against law enforcement and white people at the BET Awards." Fans also wanted him to get fired from the series. On the morning of July 5, 2016, where the petition garnered 7,000 signatures, Grey's Anatomy creator Shonda Rhimes responded to the petition by saying on Twitter in a tweet, "Um, people? Boo don't need a petition. #shondalandrules." However, the petition continued to see an increase in signatures.
