= BET Awards 2010 =

American entertainment awards ceremony

10th BET Awards
- Date: June 27, 2010
- Location: Shrine Auditorium, Los Angeles, California
- Presented by: Black Entertainment Television
- Hosted by: Queen Latifah

Television/radio coverage
- Network: BET

The 10th BET Awards took place at the Shrine Auditorium in Los Angeles, California on June 27, 2010. The awards recognized Americans in music, acting, sports, and other fields of entertainment over the past year. Queen Latifah hosted the event for the first time.

== Nominees and winners ==
Winners are highlighted in boldface

Video of the Year	Video Director of the Year
**"Video Phone" – Beyoncé feat. Lady Gaga**; "Run This Town" – Jay-Z feat. Kanye West and Rihanna; "Empire State of Mind" – Jay-Z feat. Alicia Keys; "Nothin' on You" – B.o.B feat. Bruno Mars; "It Kills Me" – Melanie Fiona	**Anthony Mandler**; Benny Boom; Gil Green; Chris Robinson; Hype Williams
Best Female R&B Artist	Best Male R&B Artist
**Alicia Keys**; Beyoncé; Mary J. Blige; Melanie Fiona; Rihanna	**Trey Songz**; Chris Brown; Raheem DeVaughn; Maxwell; Usher
Best Female Hip-Hop Artist	Best Male Hip-Hop Artist
**Nicki Minaj**; Ester Dean; Lil' Kim; Rasheeda; Trina	**Drake**; B.o.B; Fabolous; Jay-Z; Ludacris
Best Collaboration	Best New Artist
**Jay-Z feat. Alicia Keys – "Empire State of Mind"**; Beyoncé feat. Lady Gaga – "Video Phone"; B.o.B feat. Bruno Mars – "Nothin' on You"; Drake feat. Trey Songz – "Successful"; Drake feat. Lil Wayne, Kanye West & Eminem – "Forever"; Trey Songz feat. Fabolous – "Say Aah"	**Nicki Minaj**; Justin Bieber; Melanie Fiona; Wale; Young Money
Best Group	Coca-Cola Viewers' Choice
**Young Money**; The Black Eyed Peas; Clipse; Diddy-Dirty Money; New Boyz	**"Hard" – Rihanna feat. Young Jeezy**; "Sweet Dreams" – Beyoncé; "Say Aah" – Trey Songz feat. Fabolous; "Everything to Me" – Monica; "Bedrock" – Young Money
YoungStars Award	Centric Award
**Keke Palmer**; Selena Gomez; Lil' JJ; Willow Smith; Tyler James Williams	**Monica**; Melanie Fiona; Maxwell; Chrisette Michele; Sade
Best Actress	Best Actor
**Mo'Nique**; Taraji P. Henson; Regina King; Zoe Saldaña; Gabourey Sidibe	**Idris Elba**; Quinton Aaron; Don Cheadle; Jamie Foxx; Denzel Washington
Best Movie	Best Gospel Artist
**Precious**; Avatar; Law Abiding Citizen; Michael Jackson's This Is It; The Blind Side	**Marvin Sapp**; The Anointed Pace Sisters; Kirk Franklin Presents Artists United For Haiti; Tamela Mann; Vickie Winans
Subway Sportswoman of the Year	Subway Sportsman of the Year
**Serena Williams**; Tamika Catchings; Vanessa James; Candace Parker; Venus Williams	**LeBron James**; Carmelo Anthony; Usain Bolt; Kobe Bryant; Tiger Woods
Best International Act
**Dizzee Rascal** (UK); Kojo Antwi (Ghana); Chipmunk (UK); Estelle (UK); Hip Hop Pantsula (HHP) (South Africa); K'NAAN (Somalia/Canada); M.I (Nigeria); P-Square (Nigeria); Corinne Bailey Rae (UK); Sade (UK)

== Special awards ==
=== BET Lifetime Achievement Award ===
- Prince

=== BET Humanitarian Award ===
- John Legend

== Presenters ==
- Jada Pinkett Smith - Best Female R&B Artist
- Taraji P. Henson & Mike Epps - Best Female Hip Hop Artist
- Nia Long - Best Male Hip Hop Artist
- H.E.R. - Introduced Alicia Keys by singing Fallin'
- Keri Hilson - Introduced Music Matters
- Holly Robinson Peete - Paid tribute to Dorothy Height and introduced Geoffrey Canada from the documentary Waiting for "Superman"
- Monica & Deniece Williams - Best Collaboration
- Jermaine Jackson - Paid tribute to Michael Jackson and introduced Chris Brown
- Laila Ali - Sportman/women of the year
- The-Dream - Introduced another performance of Music Matters
- Keke Palmer
- LeToya Luckett - Announced upcoming performances
- Mike Epps - Introduced the Black Eyed Peas
- Black Eyed Peas - Best Male R&B Artist
- Todd Bridges - Paid tribute to Gary Coleman
- Niecy Nash & Anthony Anderson - Video of the Year
- Ciara - Introduced El DeBarge
- Chaka Khan & Patti LaBelle - Presents Prince with the Lifetime Achievement Award
- Brandy & Ray J -
- Lauren London & Boris Kodjoe

== Performers ==
- Kanye West - "Power"
- Usher - "There Goes My Baby"
- T.I. & Travis Barker - "The Way We Ride"
- Alicia Keys - "No One"/"Try Sleeping With a Broken Heart"/"If I Ain't Got You"/"Un-thinkable (I'm Ready)"
- C.J. Hilson (Music Matters performance)
- B.o.B, Keyshia Cole & Eminem - "Airplanes"/"Not Afraid"
- Monica & Deniece Williams - "Everything To Me" / "Silly"
- Diddy, Rick Ross, T.I. & Nicki Minaj - "O Let's Do It (Remix)"/"Hello Good Morning"
- Chris Brown - "The Way You Make Me Feel/Remember The Time/Smooth Criminal/Billie Jean/Man In the Mirror" (Tribute to Michael Jackson)
- Elle Varner - "So Fly" (Music Matters performance)
- Drake & Young Jeezy - "Fireworks"/"Over"/"Lose My Mind"
- El DeBarge - "All This Love"/"I Like It"/"Rhythm of the Night (song)"
- Tyrese - "Come Go With Me"/"Turn Off the Lights" (Tribute to Teddy Pendergrass)
- Kirk Franklin, Fred Hammond, Marvin Sapp, Kim Burrell, Yolanda Adams & Karen Clark-Sheard - "Are You Listening" (Tribute to the 2010 Haiti Earthquake)
- Trey Songz - "Yo Side of the Bed"/"Purple Rain"
- El DeBarge - "Second Chance" (Music Matters performance)
- Lifetime Achievement Tribute to Prince:
  - Janelle Monae - "Let's Go Crazy"
  - Esperanza Spalding - "If I Was Your Girlfriend"
  - Alicia Keys - "Adore"
  - Patti LaBelle - "Purple Rain"
- Ludacris, Nicki Minaj, T-Pain, Busta Rhymes, Rick Ross, Diddy, DJ Khaled & Tommy Lee - "All I Do Is Win"

== In Memoriam ==
- Lena Horne
- Teddy Pendergrass

== Chris Brown's Michael Jackson tribute ==
During the Awards, a tribute to Michael Jackson was performed by Chris Brown. After a speech from the singer's brother, Jermaine, the tribute began with Brown dancing Jackson's signature dances behind a lighted sheet. He then sung a piece of "The Way You Make Me Feel" and performed the Egyptian dance sequence of the "Remember the Time" music video. Brown later danced Jackson's moves to "Billie Jean", including his famous moonwalk.

Finally, Brown was to sing "Man in the Mirror", but during the performance, he began to break down in tears to the point where he could not sing the rest of the song; the audience then helped Brown with the song and Brown was seen with Jermaine on his shoulders walking with him off the stage.

He later returned to the stage when he won the AOL "fandemonium award" and gave a small speech: "I let you all down before, but I won't do it again. I promise you," he said.
