= BET Awards 2008 =

American entertainment awards ceremony

8th BET Awards
- Date: June 24, 2008
- Location: Shrine Auditorium, Los Angeles, California
- Presented by: Black Entertainment Television
- Hosted by: D. L. Hughley

Highlights
- Most awards: Kanye West (2)
- Most nominations: T-Pain (5)

Television/radio coverage
- Network: BET

The 8th BET Awards took place at the Shrine Auditorium in Los Angeles, California on June 24, 2008. The awards recognized Americans in music, acting, sports, and other fields of entertainment over the past year. Comedian D. L. Hughley hosted the awards for his first time.

== Winners and nominees ==
Best Female R&B/Pop Artist	Best Male R&B/Pop Artist
Alicia Keys; Rihanna; Mariah Carey; Keyshia Cole; Mary J. Blige	Chris Brown; Ne-Yo; Trey Songz; J. Holiday; Raheem DeVaughn
Best Female Hip Hop Artist	Best Male Hip Hop Artist
Missy Elliott; Trina; Eve; Lil Mama; Kid Sister	Kanye West; Lil Wayne; Common; Snoop Dogg; Jay-Z
Best Group	BET Centric Award
UGK; Playaz Circle; Gnarls Barkley; Danity Kane; DAY26	Raheem DeVaughn; Ledisi; Chaka Khan; Jill Scott; Angie Stone
Best New Artist	Best Gospel Artist
The-Dream; Soulja Boy; Flo Rida; Chrisette Michele; Estelle	Marvin Sapp; The Clark Sisters; Kirk Franklin; Trin-i-tee 5:7; Deitrick Haddon
Viewers' Choice	Best Collaboration
Lil Wayne ft Static Major - Lollipop; Alicia Keys - No One; Keyshia Cole ft Missy Elliott and Lil' Kim - Let It Go; Soulja Boy - Crank That; Chris Brown ft T-Pain - Kiss Kiss; Jordin Sparks ft Chris Brown - No Air	Kanye West ft T-Pain - Good Life; Keyshia Cole ft Missy Elliott and Lil' Kim - Let It Go; Chris Brown ft T-Pain - Kiss Kiss; Flo Rida ft T-Pain - Low; DJ Khaled ft Young Jeezy, Ludacris, Busta Rhymes, Big Boi, Lil Wayne, Fat Joe, Birdman and Rick Ross – I'm So Hood (Remix)
Video of the Year	Video Director of the Year
UGK - International Players Anthem (I Choose You) (featuring Outkast); Alicia Keys - Like You'll Never See Me Again; Kanye West ft T-Pain - Good Life; Erykah Badu - Honey; Mary J. Blige - Just Fine; Ashanti - The Way That I Love You	Erykah Badu; Chris Robinson; Benny Boom; Hype Williams; Gil Green
Best Actress	Best Actor
Halle Berry; Angela Bassett; Queen Latifah; Chandra Wilson; Jill Scott	Denzel Washington; Anthony Anderson; Idris Elba; Terrence Howard; Don Cheadle
Sportswoman of the Year	Sportsman of the Year
Candace Parker; Serena Williams; Venus Williams; Tamika Catchings; Cheryl Ford	Kobe Bryant; LeBron James; Floyd Mayweather Jr.; Chris Paul; Tiger Woods
Lifetime Achievement	Humanitarian Award
Al Green	Quincy Jones

== Performers ==
- Usher - Love in This Club
- Young Jeezy & Kanye West - Put On
- Keyshia Cole & Lil Kim - Heaven Sent/Let it Go
- Ne-yo - Closer
- Alicia Keys, En Vogue, TLC & SWV - Teenage Love Affair/Hold On/Waterfalls/Weak
- T-Pain, Rick Ross, Big Boi, DJ Khaled & Flo Rida - Ringleader Man/Low/The Boss/I'm So Hood
- Marvin Sapp - Never Would Have Made It
- Chris Brown - With You/Take U Down
- Jill Scott, Anthony Hamilton, Maxwell & Al Green - I'm Still In Love With You/Tired of Being Alone/Simply Beautiful/Let's Stay Together/Love and Happiness
- Rihanna - Take A Bow
- Nelly, Fergie & Ciara - Stepped On My J'z/Party People
- T-Pain, Lil Wayne - Got Money/Lollipop/A Milli

== Presenters ==
- Jennifer Hudson & Terrence Howard - Best Male R&B Artist
- Kevin Hart & Mel B - Best Male Athlete
- Cuba Gooding Jr., Nia Long & Morris Chestnut - Best Female Hip-hop Artist
- LL Cool J & Ashanti - Best New Artist
- Niecy Nash - Best Male Hip-hop Artist
- Gabrielle Union & Derek Luke - Video of the Year
- Mary Mary & Lisa Lisa - Best Gospel
- David Banner, Brandon T. Jackson, Solange, Soulja Boy & Cassie - Urges viewers to vote for the 2008 United States Presidential Election and presented Best Collaboration
- John Legend - Presented Al Green with the Lifetime Achievement Award
- Terrence & Roschi & Jacob Mann - Viewer's Choice
- Queen Latifah - Presented Quincy Jones with the Humanitarian Award
- Ashanti - Presented Nelly
- Lauren London & Sean "Diddy" Combs - Best Female R&B Artist
