= BET Awards 2011 =

American entertainment awards ceremony

11th BET Awards
- Date: June 26, 2011
- Location: Shrine Auditorium, Los Angeles, California
- Presented by: Black Entertainment Television
- Hosted by: Kevin Hart

Television/radio coverage
- Network: BET

The 11th BET Awards took place at the Shrine Auditorium in Los Angeles, California on June 26, 2011. The awards recognized Americans in music, acting, sports, and other fields of entertainment over the past year. Comedian and actor Kevin Hart hosted the event for the first time. The show had an audience of 7.7 million.

== Performers ==
- Mary J. Blige (featuring Anita Baker/DJ Khaled/Jadakiss) - "Mary Jane (All Night Long)", "You Bring Me Joy", "Real Love, "Caught Up In The Rapture", "It Ain't Over Til It's Over"
- Rick Ross (featuring DJ Khaled/Lil Wayne/Ace Hood) - "Aston Martin Music", "Hustle Hard"
- Jill Scott - "Rolling Hills"
- The Five Heartbeats & After 7 - "Nights Like This"
- Simbi Khali "Can't Get Enough"
- Snoop Dogg/Warren G - "Regulate"
- Patti LaBelle - "Love, Need and Want You", "Lady Marmalade"
- Chris Brown/Busta Rhymes/Lil Wayne - "Look at Me Now", "She Ain't You", "Paper, Scissors, Rock"
- Alicia Keys (featuring Bruno Mars/Rick Ross) - "Typewriter", "A Woman's Worth", "Maybach Music", "Fallin'"
- Big Sean (featuring Chris Brown) - "My Last"
- Cherrelle/Alexander O'Neal - "Saturday Love"
- Trey Songz - "Unusual", "Love Faces"
- Kelly Rowland - (featuring Trey Songz) - "Motivation"
- Deitrick Haddon/Mary Mary/Donnie McClurkin - "Thank You Lord"
- Cee-Lo Green/Marsha Ambrosius/Shirley Caesar - "Somebody Loves You Baby (You Know Who It Is)", "If Only You Knew", You Are My Friend"
- DJ Khaled (featuring Drake/Lil Wayne/Rick Ross) - "I'm on One"
- Queen Latifah - "The Revolution Will Not Be Televised"
- Ledisi - "Out on a Limb"
- Beyoncé - "Best Thing I Never Had" and "End of Time" live from her headline performance at the Glastonbury Festival.

== Nominees and winners ==
Winners are highlighted in boldface

Video of the Year	Video Director of the Year
**"Look at Me Now" – Chris Brown feat. Lil Wayne and Busta Rhymes**; "Far Away" – Marsha Ambrosius; "Airplanes" – B.o.B feat. Hayley Williams; "Pretty Girl Rock" – Keri Hilson; "Whip My Hair" – Willow Smith; "Runaway" – Kanye West	**Chris Robinson**; Benny Boom; Mr. Boomtown; Kanye West; Hype Williams
Best Female R&B Artist	Best Male R&B Artist
**Rihanna**; Marsha Ambrosius; Jennifer Hudson; Beyoncé; Keri Hilson	**Chris Brown**; Usher; Cee-Lo Green; Bruno Mars; Trey Songz
Best Female Hip-Hop Artist	Best Male Hip-Hop Artist
**Nicki Minaj**; Cymphonique; Diamond; Lola Monroe	**Kanye West**; B.o.B; Drake; Lil Wayne; Rick Ross
Best Collaboration	Best New Artist
**"Look at Me Now" – Chris Brown feat. Lil Wayne and Busta Rhymes**; "Airplanes" – B.o.B feat. Hayley Williams; "All of the Lights" – Kanye West feat. Rihanna; "Deuces" – Chris Brown feat. Kevin McCall and Tyga; "No Hands" – Waka Flocka Flame feat. Wale and Roscoe Dash; "What's My Name?" – Rihanna feat. Drake	**Wiz Khalifa**; J. Cole; Bruno Mars; Miguel; Willow Smith
Best Group	Coca-Cola Viewers' Choice
**Diddy-Dirty Money**; Cali Swag District; N.E.R.D; New Boyz; Travis Porter	**"Look at Me Now" – Chris Brown feat. Lil Wayne and Busta Rhymes**; "6 Foot 7 Foot" – Lil Wayne feat. Cory Gunz; "My Girl" – Mindless Behavior; "Moment 4 Life" – Nicki Minaj feat. Drake; "What's My Name?" – Rihanna feat. Drake; "Bottoms Up" – Trey Songz feat. Nicki Minaj
YoungStars Award	Centric Award
**Jaden Smith**; **Willow Smith**; Shenell Edmonds; Keke Palmer; Diggy Simmons	**Marsha Ambrosius**; R. Kelly; Eric Benet; Cee-Lo Green; Kem
Best Actress	Best Actor
**Taraji P. Henson**; Halle Berry; Regina King; Zoe Saldaña; Kerry Washington	**Idris Elba**; Laz Alonso; Chris Brown; Don Cheadle; Jamie Foxx
Best Movie	Best Gospel Artist
**For Colored Girls**; Death at a Funeral; Takers; Why Did I Get Married Too?	**Mary Mary**; Byron Cage; Deitrick Haddon; Karen Clark Sheard; BeBe & CeCe Winans
Subway Sportswoman of the Year	Subway Sportsman of the Year
**Serena Williams**; Tamika Catchings; Candice Dupree; Maya Moore; Venus Williams	**Michael Vick**; Carmelo Anthony; Kobe Bryant; LeBron James; Derrick Rose
Best International Act: Africa	Best International Act: United Kingdom
**2face Idibia (Nigeria)**; **D'banj (Nigeria)**; D-Black (Ghana); Fally Ipupa (DR Congo); Angélique Kidjo (Benin); Teargas (South Africa)	**Tinie Tempah**; VV Brown; Chipmunk; Laura Izibor; Skepta; Tinchy Stryder

=== FANdemonium Award ===
- **Chris Brown**
  - Nicki Minaj
  - Lady Gaga
  - Mindless Behavior

=== BET Lifetime Achievement Award ===
- **Patti LaBelle**

=== BET Humanitarian Award ===
- **Steve Harvey**

== Controversy ==
Following the announcement of the nominees on a special edition of 106 & Park on May 17, 2011, controversy surfaced on some of the categories. Rapper Trina, who released her fifth studio album Amazin in 2010, felt snubbed that she was not included among the nominees for the Best Female Hip-Hop Artist category, taking to her Twitter account to post "f*ck BET......". Two of the artists who were nominated—Nicki Minaj and Diamond— also criticized the nominations via Twitter. Singer Keyshia Cole also felt snubbed for not receiving any nominations, and took to her Twitter account, saying "its like this. Been on the scene 7 years. I was 21 when I got signed. 7 # 1 records. No awards 4 none of them/still touring. It is Wht it is." She also tweeted, "These types of thing R the way they R. I'm not upset about any of it in any way. I hope everyone that goes has a wonderful time."

BET's president of programming, music and specials, Stephen Hill, spoke about the matter in an interview with Billboard.com's The Juice. In response to criticism over Trina for not getting any nominations, Hill said she did not submit a music video during the eligibility period of April 1, 2010 to March 30, 2011. Although she was featured in LoLa Monroe's music video for "Over Time" in November 2010, Hill said being a featured act "doesn't make you eligible". He also responded to Cole's nominations snub, stating "we simply had to go, as we always do, with the artists who got the most votes in that [best female R&B artist] category. The nominations consist of the artists that got the top votes in that category when put to our voting academy. If there is six nominations in a category that means there was a tie."

There was criticism that Beyoncé received a nomination, despite the fact that her last album I Am... Sasha Fierce was released in 2008. Hill stated, "Beyoncé submitted a video for "Why Don't You Love Me" early May of 2010. She submitted one video remaining from her I Am... Sasha Fierce project. That was the last video she submitted and it was submitted during this year's eligibility period. She was voted on the strength of that one video even though the bulk of that project was the year before."

Also, on the night of the award show ceremony, R&B artist Lloyd criticized the show. Feeling snubbed, Lloyd cited on his Twitter page how upset he was that his video, along with his record label mates, Lil Wayne and Young Money had the first R&B single of the Lil Wayne's career to reach number 1 on BET's 106 and Park, for the song "Bedrock", yet were not nominated for an award.
