= BET Awards 2004 =

American entertainment awards ceremony

4th BET Awards
- Date: June 29, 2004
- Location: Kodak Theatre, Los Angeles, California
- Presented by: Black Entertainment Television
- Hosted by: Mo'Nique

Television/radio coverage
- Network: BET

The 4th BET Awards took place at the Kodak Theatre in Los Angeles, California on June 29, 2004. The awards recognized Americans in music, acting, sports, and other fields of entertainment over the past year. Comedienne Mo'Nique hosted the event for the second time.

== Performances ==
- Kanye West (ft. Yolanda Adams) — "Jesus Walks"
- Rick James (featuring Teena Marie) — "Fire & Desire"
- OutKast — "Roses"
- Alicia Keys — "If I Ain't Got You"
- India.Arie — "Georgia on My Mind" (Ray Charles tribute)
- Jay-Z (featuring Kid Rock, Dave Navarro, Sheila E., Rick Rubin, Questlove, Omar Edwards and Adam Blackstone) — "99 Problems" and "Public Service Announcement (Interlude)"
- Janet Jackson (featuring Elephant Man) — Medley: "All Nite (Don't Stop)," "R&B Junkie" and "All Nite (Don't Stop) (So So Def Remix)." (Janet opened her medley with a spoken word poem that references the controversy and fallout from her performance on the Super Bowl XXXVIII halftime show: "Life is strange. One day you're adored; the next you're scorned. How do you handle the confusion? Where you put the frustration? I know a place, a place that lifts the fog, that eases the pain''")
- Hip-Hop 25th Anniversary Celebration:
  - Sugarhill Gang— "Rapper's Delight"
  - Grandmaster Flash and the Furious Five — "The Message"
  - MC Lyte — "Paper Thin"
  - Slick Rick — ""
  - Doug E. Fresh -- "The Show"/"La Di Da Di"
  - Public Enemy -- "Fight the Power"
- Smokie Norful -- "Can't Nobody"
- The Isley Brothers -- "Fight the Power (Part 1 & 2)", "Between the Sheets", "For the Love of You", "Contagious", "It's Your Thing" and "Shout" (Lifetime Achievement Award performance)

== Presenters ==
- Brandy and Jamie Foxx—presented Best Male R&B Artist
- Vivica A. Fox and Mase—presented Best Collaboration
- Nicole Ari Parker, Boris Kodjoe and LL Cool J—presented Best New Artist
- Kyla Pratt and Jeremy Suarez—presented Best Group
- Raven-Symoné and Tracee Ellis Ross—presented Best Gospel Artist
- Mo'Nique and Dorien Wilson—introduced Janet Jackson
- Ruben Studdard and Fantasia Barrino—presented Best Male Hip-Hop Artist
- Gabrielle Union and Carmelo Anthony—presented Best Actor
- Leon—introduced Smokie Norful
- Steve Harvey—introduced The Isley Brothers and presented their Lifetime Achievement Award

== Awards and nominations ==
Video of the Year

- Outkast" for Hey Ya!"
  - Beyoncé for "Crazy in Love" featuring Jay Z
  - Alicia Keys for "You Don't Know My Name"
  - Outkast for "The Way You Move" featuring Sleepy Brown
  - Usher for "Yeah!" featuring Ludacris & Lil Jon

Viewer's Choice

- Usher for "Yeah!" featuring Ludacris & Lil Jon
  - Outkast" for Hey Ya!"
  - Kanye West for "All Falls Down" featuring Syleena Johnson
  - Beyoncé for "Crazy in Love" featuring Jay Z
  - Lil Jon and the East Side Boyz for "Get Low" featuring Ying Yang Twins

Best Collaboration

- Beyoncé for "Crazy in Love" featuring Jay Z
  - Usher for "Yeah!" featuring Ludacris & Lil Jon
  - Outkast for "The Way You Move" featuring Sleepy Brown
  - Twista for "Slow Jamz" featuring Kanye West & Jamie Foxx
  - Pharrell Williams for "Frontin'" featuring Jay Z

Best New Artist

- Kanye West
  - Pharrell Williams
  - Ruben Studdard
  - Anthony Hamilton
  - Chingy

Best Group

- Outkast
  - G-Unit
  - Lil Jon and the East Side Boyz
  - Jagged Edge
  - Floetry

Best Gospel Artist

- Yolanda Adams
  - Vickie Winans
  - Byron Cage
  - Smokie Norful
  - Donnie McClurkin

Best Female Hip-Hop Artist

- Missy Elliott
  - Da Brat
  - Jacki-O
  - MC Lyte
  - Rah Digga

Best Male Hip-Hop Artist

- Jay Z
  - 50 Cent
  - Chingy
  - Kanye West
  - Ludacris

Best Female R&B Artist

- Beyoncé
  - Mary J. Blige
  - Janet Jackson
  - Alicia Keys
  - Monica

Best Male R&B Artist

- Usher
  - Anthony Hamilton
  - Ruben Studdard
  - R. Kelly
  - Luther Vandross

Best Actress

- Halle Berry
  - Beyoncé
  - Vivica A. Fox
  - Sanaa Lathan
  - Gabrielle Union

Best Actor

- Denzel Washington
  - Morgan Freeman
  - Mos Def
  - Will Smith
  - Don Cheadle
  - Laurence Fishburne

Best Female Athlete of the Year

- Serena Williams
  - Cheryl Ford
  - Lisa Leslie
  - Laila Ali
  - Venus Williams

Best Male Athlete of the Year

- LeBron James
  - Barry Bonds
  - Carmelo Anthony
  - Tiger Woods
  - Shaquille O'Neal

Lifetime Achievement Award

- The Isley Brothers

Humanitarian Award

- Danny Glover
