= List of awards and nominations received by Ava DuVernay =

Ava DuVernay awards and nominations
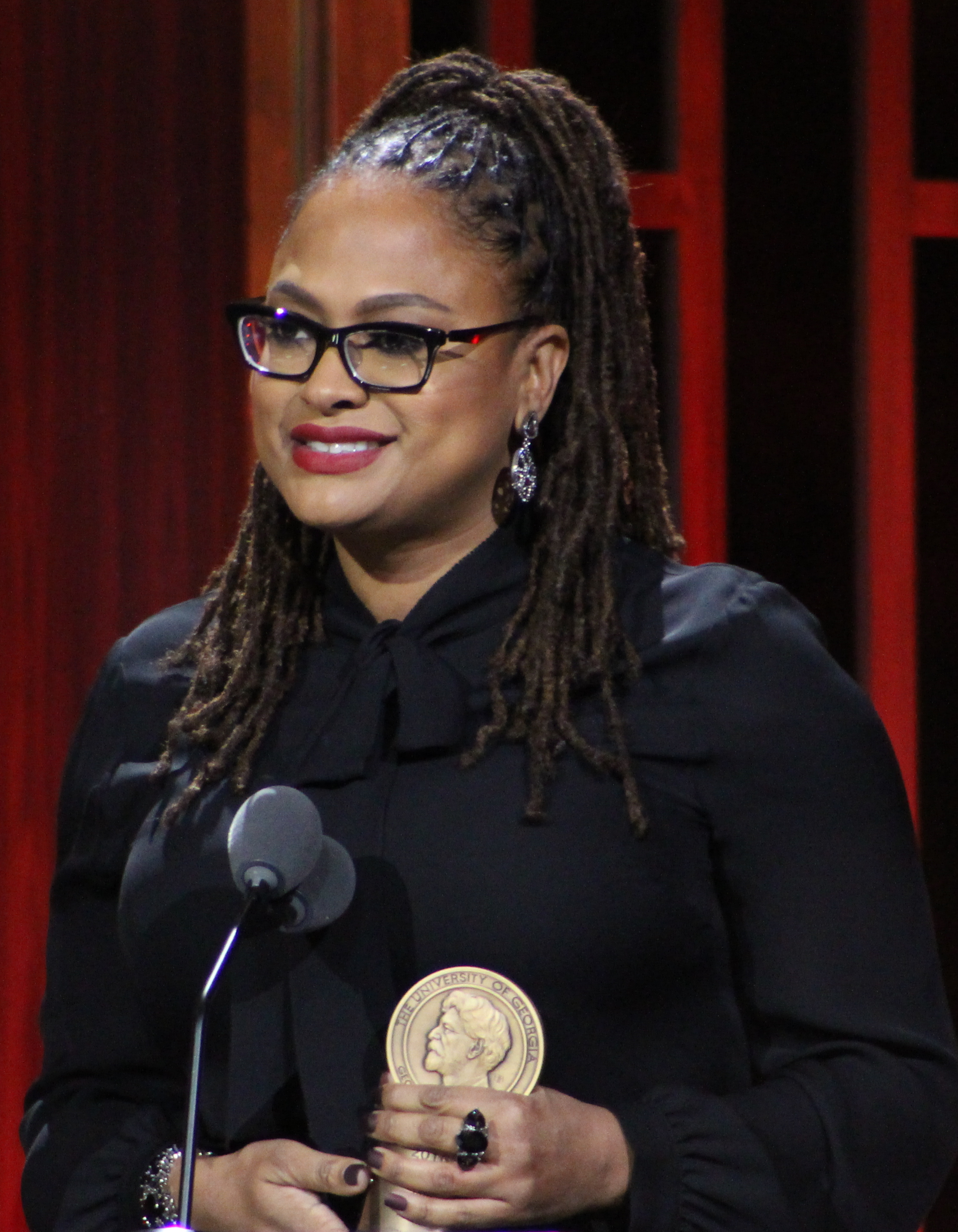
- DuVernay at the Peabody Awards
Awards and nominations
Award	Wins	Nominations
Academy Awards	0	1
BAFTA Awards	2	2
Primetime Emmy Awards	2	6
Golden Globe Awards	0	1
Gotham Awards	2	3
Grammy Awards	0	1
NAACP Image Awards	3	7
Spirit Awards	1	3
Venice Film Festival	0	1

Totals (Note: Certain award groups do not simply award one winner. They acknowledge several different recipients, have runners-up, and have third place. Since this is a specific recognition and is different from losing an award, runner-up mentions are considered wins in this award tally. For simplification and to avoid errors, each award in this list has been presumed to have had a prior nomination.)
- Wins: 50
- Nominations: 108

This is a list of awards and nominations received by American director and screenwriter Ava DuVernay.

Active in the cinematographic field since 2000s, DuVernay started as an independent director, received critics associations accolades for This Is the Life (2008), I Will Follow (2010) and Middle of Nowhere (2012), for which she was recognized with the Independent Spirit John Cassavetes Award. In 2014 she directed Selma based on the 1965 Selma to Montgomery voting rights marches, which was nominated for Best Picture at the 87th Academy Awards, and gave her a nomination at the Golden Globe Award for Best Director. The related soundtrack album generated her a Grammy Award nomination as a producer.

In 2013 DuVernay produced, wrote and directed documentary film 13th, becoming the first black woman nominated for an Academy Award for Best Documentary Feature. Her work was honored with two Primetime Creative Arts Emmy Award, two Critics' Choice Documentary Awards and tow BAFTA Award, including the John Schlesinger Award for Excellence in Directing.

Since 2016 she directed and wrote episodes of television series Queen Sugar, winning an NAACP Image Award, and When They See Us, being nominated for three Primetime Emmy Awards. In 2018 she made her video direction debut with "Family Feud" by Jay-Z and Beyoncé, winning the BET Award for Video Director of the Year. In 2024 she directed Origin, competing at the 80th Venice International Film Festival for Golden Lion.

DuVernay was also honored by the Royal Photographic Society, the Dorothy and Lillian Gish Prize and the International Emmy Awards. In 2020 she was honored for her independent distribution company ARRAY with the Industrial Honor by the Peabody Awards.

== Major associations ==
=== Academy Awards ===
The Academy Awards, popularly known as the Oscars, are awards for artistic and technical merit in the film industry, given annually by the Academy of Motion Picture Arts and Sciences.

Year	Category	Work	Result	Ref.
2017	Best Documentary Feature	13th	Nominated	

=== BAFTA Awards ===
The BAFTA Awards are presented in an annual award show hosted by the British Academy of Film and Television Arts to honour the best British and international contributions to film, TV shows and video-games.

Year	Category	Work	Result	Ref.
British Academy Film Awards
2017	Best Documentary	13th	Won	
British Academy Britannia Awards
2017	John Schlesinger Award for Excellence in Directing	Herself	Honoree	

=== Emmy Awards ===
The Emmy Awards are an extensive range of awards for artistic and technical merit for the American and international television industry.

Year	Category	Work	Result	Ref.
International Emmy Awards
2022	Founders Award	Herself	Honoree	
Primetime Creative Arts Emmy Awards
2017	Outstanding Documentary or Nonfiction Special	13th	Won	
2017	Outstanding Directing for a Documentary/Nonfiction Program	13th	Nominated	
2017	Outstanding Writing for a Nonfiction Programming	13th	Won	
Primetime Emmy Awards
2019	Outstanding Limited Series	When They See Us	Nominated	
2019	Outstanding Directing for a Limited Series, Movie, or Dramatic Special	When They See Us	Nominated	
2019	Outstanding Writing for a Limited Series, Movie, or Dramatic Special	When They See Us	Nominated	

=== Golden Globe Awards ===
The Golden Globe Awards are accolades bestowed by the members of the Hollywood Foreign Press Association, recognizing excellence in both American and international film and television.

Year	Category	Work	Result	Ref.
2014	Best Director	Selma	Nominated	

=== Grammy Awards ===
The Grammy Awards are accolades presented by the Recording Academy of the United States to recognize "outstanding" achievements in the music industry.

Year	Category	Work	Result	Ref.
2016	Best Compilation Soundtrack for Visual Media	Selma: Music from the Motion Picture	Nominated	

== Other awards and nominations ==
=== BET Awards ===
Year	Work	Category	Result	Ref.
2018	"Family Feud"	Video Director of the Year	Won	

=== Black Reel Awards ===
Year	Work	Category	Result	Ref.
2010	Outstanding Independent Feature	This Is the Life	Nominated	
2011	Outstanding Feature Documentary	My Mic Sounds Nice: A Truth About Women and Hip Hop	Nominated	
2012	Outstanding Director	I Will Follow	Nominated	
2012	Outstanding Screenplay	I Will Follow	Nominated	
2013	Outstanding Film	Middle of Nowhere	Nominated	
2013	Outstanding Screenplay	Middle of Nowhere	Won	
2013	Outstanding Director	Middle of Nowhere	Won	
2014	Outstanding Television Documentary	Nine for IX	Nominated	
2015	Outstanding Director	Selma	Won	
2016	Outstanding Film	13th	Nominated	
2016	Outstanding Feature Documentary	13th	Won	
2017	Outstanding Drama Series	Queen Sugar	Nominated	
2017	Outstanding Directing, Drama Series	Queen Sugar	Nominated	
2017	Outstanding Writing, Drama Series	Queen Sugar	Nominated	
2018	Outstanding Drama Series	Queen Sugar	Nominated	
2018	Outstanding Writing, Drama Serie	Queen Sugar	Nominated	
2019	Outstanding TV Movie/Limited Series	When They See Us	Won	
2019	Outstanding Directing, TV Movie/Limited Series	When They See Us	Won	
2019	Outstanding Writing, TV Movie/Limited Series	When They See Us (Ep. Part One)	Won	
2019	Outstanding Writing, TV Movie/Limited Series	When They See Us (Ep. Part Two)	Nominated	
2019	Outstanding Writing, TV Movie/Limited Series	When They See Us (Ep. Part Three)	Nominated	
2019	Outstanding Writing, TV Movie/Limited Series	When They See Us (Ep. Part Four)	Nominated	
2022	Outstanding Directing, TV Movie/Limited Series	Colin in Black & White	Nominated	
2024	Outstanding Film	Origin	Nominated	
2024	Outstanding Director	Origin	Nominated	
2024	Outstanding Screenplay	Origin	Nominated	
2024	Outstanding Directing in a Drama Series	Queen Sugar	Nominated	
2024	Outstanding Writing in a Drama Series	Queen Sugar	Nominated	

=== Critics' Choice Awards ===
The Critics' Choice Movie Awards or Broadcast Film Critics Association Award is an awards show presented annually by the American-Canadian Critics Choice Association (CCA) to honor the finest in cinematic achievement.

Year	Work	Category	Result	Ref.
Critics' Choice Documentary Awards
2016	Best Documentary Feature TV/Streaming	13th	Won	
2016	Best Director TV/Streaming	13th	Won	
Critics' Choice Movie Awards
2014	Best Director	Selma	Nominated	
Celebration of Black Cinema and Television
2022	Trailblazer Award	Herself	Won	

=== Directors Guild of America Awards ===
The Directors Guild of America Awards are issued annually by the Directors Guild of America.

Year	Work	Category	Result	Ref.
2020	When They See Us	Outstanding Directing – Miniseries or TV Film	Nominated	

=== Film Independent Spirit Awards ===
The Film Independent Spirit Awards are awards presented annually to independent filmmakers by Film Independent.

Year	Work	Category	Result	Ref.
2012	Middle of Nowhere	John Cassavetes Award	Won	
2015	Selma	Best Director	Nominated	
2017	13th	Best Documentary	Nominated	

=== GLAAD Media Awards ===
The GLAAD Media Awards is an annual presentation of the GLAAD Media Awards, presented by GLAAD, honoring films, television shows, musicians and works of journalism that fairly and accurately represent the LGBT community and issues relevant to the community.

Year	Work	Category	Result	Ref.
2018	Herself	Excellence in Media Award	Honoree	

=== Gotham Awards ===
The Gotham Awards are American film awards, presented annually to the makers of independent films by the Gotham Film & Media Institute.

Year	Work	Category	Result	Ref.
2012	Middle of Nowhere	Best Feature	Nominated	
2019	When They See Us	Breakthrough Series – Long Form	Won	
2019	Herself	Tribute Awards	Honoree	

=== IDA Documentary Awards ===
The IDA Documentary Awards is an annual event organized by the International Documentary Association that recognises and honours outstanding documentary films and filmmakers.

Year	Work	Category	Result	Ref.
2016	13th	Best Feature	Nominated	
2016	13th	VideoSource Award	Won	

=== NAACP Image Awards ===
The NAACP Image Awards is an annual awards ceremony presented by the U.S.-based National Association for the Advancement of Colored People to honor outstanding performances in film, television, theatre, music, and literature.

Year	Work	Category	Result	Ref.
2012	I Will Follow	Outstanding Independent Motion Picture	Nominated	
2015	Selma	Outstanding Motion Picture	Nominated	
2017	Queen Sugar (for "First Things First")	Outstanding Writing in a Dramatic Series	Won	
2018	Queen Sugar (for "Dream Variations")	Outstanding Writing in a Dramatic Series	Nominated	
2018	Herself	Entertainer of the Year	Won	
2024	Origin	Outstanding Motion Picture	Nominated	
2024	Origin	Outstanding Directing in a Motion Picture	Won	

=== Peabody Awards ===
The Peabody Awards honor what are described as the most powerful, enlightening, and invigorating stories in television, radio, and online media.

Year	Work	Category	Result	Ref.
2020	ARRAY	Institutional Honors	Honoree	

=== Producers Guild of America Awards ===
The Producers Guild of America Awards are issued annually by the Producers Guild of America.

Year	Work	Category	Result	Ref.
2020	When They See Us	Best Limited Series Television	Nominated	

=== Royal Photographic Society Awards ===
The Royal Photographic Society presents a series of awards to photographers and other individuals in photography.

Year	Work	Category	Result	Ref.
2021	Herself	Cinematic Production Award	Honoree	

=== Satellite Awards ===
The Satellite Awards is an award ceremony honoring the year's outstanding performers, films, television shows, home videos and interactive media, presented by the International Press Academy.

Year	Work	Category	Result	Ref.
2015	Selma	Best Film	Nominated	
2015	Selma	Best Director	Nominated	

=== The Dorothy and Lillian Gish Prize ===
The Dorothy and Lillian Gish Prize is given annually by JPMorgan Chase Bank to "a man or woman who has made an outstanding contribution to the beauty of the world and to mankind's enjoyment and understanding of life".

Year	Work	Category	Result	Ref.
2020	Herself	The Dorothy and Lillian Gish Prize	Honoree	

=== Venice Film Festival ===
The Venice Film Festival is part of the Venice Biennale and is the world's oldest film festival.

Year	Work	Category	Result	Ref.
2023	Origin	Golden Lion	Nominated	

== Critics awards ==
Association	Year	Work	Category	Result	Ref.
African-American Film Critics Association	2011	I Will Follow	Best Screenplay	Won	
African-American Film Critics Association	2012	Middle of Nowhere	Best Independent Film	Won	
African-American Film Critics Association	2012	Middle of Nowhere	Best Picture	Nominated	
African-American Film Critics Association	2012	Middle of Nowhere	Best Screenplay	Won	
African-American Film Critics Association	2014	Selma	Best Director	Won	
African-American Film Critics Association	2024	Origin	Best Drama	Won	
African-American Film Critics Association	2024	Origin	Best Director	Won	
Alliance of Women Film Journalists	2012	Middle of Nowhere	Best Woman Screenwriter	Nominated	
Alliance of Women Film Journalists	2016	13th	Best Woman Director	Won	
Alliance of Women Film Journalists	2016	13th	Outstanding Achievement by a Woman in the Film Industry	Won	
American Film Festival	2015	Selma	Best Film	Won	
American Film Festival	2015	Selma	Top Films	Nominated	
Camerimage	2013	Middle of Nowhere	Directors' Debuts Competition	Nominated	
Astra TV Awards	2023	Queen Sugar	Best Directing in a Broadcast Network or Cable Drama Series	Nominated	
Dallas–Fort Worth Film Critics Association	2014	Selma	Best Director	Nominated	
Dorian Awards	2014	Selma	Film Director of the Year	Won	
Georgia Film Critics Association	2015	Selma	Oglethorpe Award	Won	
Georgia Film Critics Association	2015	Selma	Best Director	Nominated	
Georgia Film Critics Association	2015	Selma	Breakthrough Award	Nominated	
Georgia Film Critics Association	2024	Origin	Oglethorpe Award	Runner-up	
Hollywood Black Film Festival	2008	This Is the Life	Audience Choice Award for Best Documentary	Won	
Hollywood Black Film Festival	2008	This Is the Life	Jury Award for Best Documentary	Won	
Hollywood Critics Association	2018	A Wrinkle in Time	Best Female Director	Nominated	
Latino Entertainment Journalists Association Film Awards	2024	Origin	Best Picture	Nominated	
Latino Entertainment Journalists Association Film Awards	2024	Origin	Best Director	Nominated	
Los Angeles Film Critics Association	2014	Selma	New Generation Award	Won	
Online Film Critics Society Award	2014	Selma	Best Director	Nominated	
Palm Springs International Film Festival	2015	Selma	Directors to Watch Award	Won	
Palm Springs International Film Festival	2015	Selma	Best Narrative Feature	Won	
Pan African Film Festival	2008	This Is the Life	Best Documentary	Won	
Pan African Film Festival	2008	This Is the Life	Jury Award - Honorable Mention	Won	
Reelworld Film Festival	2008	This Is the Life	Audience Award - Documentary	Won	
Stockholm International Film Festival	2012	Middle of Nowhere	Bronze Horse	Nominated	
Sundance Film Festival	2012	Middle of Nowhere	Directing Award	Won	
Sundance Film Festival	2012	Middle of Nowhere	Grand Jury Prize	Nominated	
TCA Awards	2019	When They See Us	Program of the Year	Nominated	
TCA Awards	2019	When They See Us	Outstanding Achievement in Movies, Miniseries and Specials	Nominated	
Virginia Film Festival	2023	Herself	Visionary Award	Won	
Washington D.C. Area Film Critics Association Awards	2014	13th	Best Director	Nominated	
Washington D.C. Area Film Critics Association Awards	2023	Origin	Best Adapted Screenplay	Nominated	
Women Film Critics Circle	2012	Middle of Nowhere	Josephine Baker Award	Won	
Women Film Critics Circle	2016	13th	Best Woman Storyteller	Won	
Women Film Critics Circle	2016	13th	Courage in Filmmaking	Won	
Women in Film Crystal + Lucy Awards	2015	Herself	Dorothy Arzner Directors award	Honoree	
