= Molly Mayeux =

American producer

Molly M. Mayeux is an American producer. She got her start as a production runner on the film Everybody's All-American in 1988. As of 2012, she is credited in the production of more than 40 films. She is the founder and president of Dahlia Street Films.

== Filmography ==
=== Producer ===
- Buddy Holly Is Alive and Well on Ganymede (producer)
- Blind Turn (producer)
- Deadline (producer)
- I Will Follow (producer)
- Open Gate (producer)
- Homeland (line producer)
- Soccer Mom (line producer)
- The Loss of a Teardrop Diamond (line producer)
- Rain (producer)
- The Strand (co-producer)
- Two Weeks (line producer)
- Wasted (line producer)
- Open Window (line producer)
- The Hand Job (producer)
- Dandelion (producer)
- Easy (co-producer)
- Rustin (2001 film) (producer)
- Dancing in September (line producer)
- The Hi-Line (producer)
- Savior (associate producer)
- I Shot a Man in Vegas (producer)

=== Second Unit Director or Assistant Director ===
- An American Town (TV movie) (second assistant director)
- Gun Shy (second assistant director)
- Entropy (assistant director: Los Angeles)
- A Thousand Acres (second assistant director)
- The Locusts (second assistant director)
- Kingpin (second assistant director)
- Almost Blue (first assistant director)
- Batman Forever (second second assistant director)
- Dumb & Dumber (second assistant director)
- The Road to Wellville (second assistant director)
- The Puppet Masters (second assistant director: second unit)
- Getting Even with Dad (second second assistant director)
- Matinee (second second assistant director)
- Leather Jackets (second assistant director)
- Driving Me Crazy (second assistant director)
- Best of the Best (second second assistant director)

=== Miscellaneous Crew ===
- Ghost in the Machine (production assistant: second unit)
- Hook (production assistant)
- Shout (production assistant)
- Joe Versus the Volcano (production aide)
- Scenes from the Class Struggle in Beverly Hills (assistant craft service)
- Everybody's All-American (production runner)

=== Production Manager ===
- Diary of a Mad Black Woman (unit production manager)
- Easy (unit production manager)
- Rustin (unit production manager)
