= A Door Marked Exit =

- Scandal episode
- Episode no.: Season 3 Episode 10
- Directed by: Tom Verica
- Written by: Zahir McGhee
- Original air date: December 12, 2013

Guest appearances
- Joe Morton as Rowan "Eli" Pope; Kate Burton as Sally Langston; Dan Bucatinsky as James Novak

Episode chronology
← Previous "YOLO"	Next → "Ride, Sally, Ride"
- Scandal (season 3)

"A Door Marked Exit" is the tenth episode and the winter finale of the 3rd season of Scandal, and is the 38th overall episode. It premiered on December 12, 2013 in the U.S.

== Plot ==
Following on from the revelation that Sally Langston had murdered her husband, Daniel Douglas, a flashback reveals what led up to this turn of events. Sally, after learning that her husband cheated on her with James, is infuriated when Daniel says he's leaving her. In a fit of rage, Sally stabs him in the back and, after a brief pause, calls Cyrus Beene to tell him.

After Huck's work with her teeth, Quinn has a tracking device where her tooth used to be. At B-613, she tries to make a deal with Rowan while preparing to inject him with a lethal syringe, but the deal is off once Maya's location is discovered. Quinn manages to remove the tracking device from her mouth, making Huck loses her signal after she flushes it down the toilet. Quinn and Charlie are then called in for a job at the vice president's home.

Cyrus wants Sally to let him fix this mess. They set Daniel Douglas up in their bed, making it seem as though he had a heart attack. Cyrus convinces a traumatized Sally not to let the examining doctor to get too close to the body, after which Cyrus convinces the doctor to forgo the formal examination to make it seem like a heart attack.

Rowan is on the move to track down Maya until his team is boxed in by agents working for the President. Fitz plans to detain him until Olivia's mom is free. He wants to know why he was ordered to shoot down that plane if Maya was already in custody. He also reveals the intimate details of what he does with Olivia. This has Rowan going off on him for never having had to work for anything. He says Fitz isn't in love with his daughter, and states that loving Olivia is his way out. If he's with her, he no longer has to be his father's son. He calls the President a small, insignificant boy.

Mellie is ecstatic that Daniel Douglas is dead. Cyrus is less enthused as he engages in some early morning drinking. He spills the details about how the devil came to Sally. He knows that they are the devil in this particular situation. Mellie orders Cyrus to pull it together. That's not going to be easy since James thinks he might be a murderer. He relays his concerns to David Rosen, who isn't interested in helping the man who almost destroyed his career.

Olivia uses the Fitz Phone when she realizes the president is holding her father in the basement of the Pentagon. She joins the two of them. She knows there was a bomb on the plane. Rowan/Eli/Command made a judgment call to shoot it down to kill 329 people instead of the thousands that would have perished if it detonated over London. As it turns out, Maya lied. She tricked her husband into killing those passengers. Olivia orders Fitz to have her mom arrested the second she gets off the plane.

Rowan is set free to continue doing B-613. As for Maya, her plane never made it to Hong Kong. It was found in Mongolia with the entire crew murdered. There's no sign of Maya. Olivia believes someone will likely pay for what went down with her father. She tries to warn Jake, but he's only interested in kissing her.

Quinn sneaks away while Charlie is asleep. She returns to the Pope & Associates offices to talk to Huck, and is shocked to hear that he is unrepentant about torturing her. This sends her back to Charlie, and B-613.

Cyrus tells James that he's the love of his life, hoping that he won't leave him. James agrees to stay with Cyrus if he's named White House Press Secretary, which Cyrus accepts.

Mellie lets Sally know that they are taking care of everything. Sally tries to tell Leo Bergen that she's not going to run for president, but ends up spilling the news that she killed Daniel. Leo is furious that she called the White House for help. He says, “You kill somebody... you call me.”

A woman who worked as a contractor for the NSA contacts David. She has a recording of the vice president’s call to Cyrus after killing her husband.

Olivia calls her father. She wants to know if he was trying to protect Olivia from who her mother was. He offers to talk to her about other things at Sunday dinner because she’s never going to get the answers she’s looking for from him. He heads back to work, but Jake is behind his desk, as the new head of B-613. Fitz lets him know via phone that the two of them will make a heck of a team.

Maya calls Olivia but won’t reveal her location. She only tells her daughter that she will see her real soon. It is revealed that Maya made that call from just outside the White House.

== Production ==
The episode was written by Zahir McGhee and directed by executive producer Tom Verica. The episode featured the song "Living for the City" by Stevie Wonder. The writers of the show began brainstorming for the episode early in October. Filming for the episode began on October 31.

== Reception ==
=== Broadcasting and ratings ===
"A Door Marked Exit" was originally broadcast on Thursday, December 12, 2013 in the United States on ABC. The episode's total viewership was 9,22 million and in the key 18–49 demographic, the episode earned a 3.2 Nielsen rating, up 12 percent from the previous episode in total viewers (8.27) and up 7 percent in the target 18–49 demographic (3.0) marking the 2nd-highest-ever episode in the key demographic 18-49.

The Nielsen score additionally registered the show as the week's highest rated drama and third-highest rated scripted series in the 18–49 demographic, placing behind ABC's Modern Family (3.5) and Fox's The Simpsons (3.5). Seven days of time-shifted viewing added on an additional 1.4 rating points in the 18–49 demographic and 3.67 million viewers, bringing the total viewership for the episode to 13.04 million viewers with a 4.6 Nielsen rating in the 18–49 demographic.

=== Critical response ===
The episode received mostly positive reviews, and were better received than the previous episode "YOLO". Sonia Saraiya, writing for The A.V. Club, said: "This is a way better episode than last week’s awful, awful “YOLO,” but it's still suspiciously murky—it doesn't neatly tie off the loose ends that this season unraveled", referring to the previous episode.

Miranda Wicker from TV Fanatic praised the episode, saying: "Ahhh! Scandal!! Allow me a moment to lose my mind a little bit about how amazing that mid-season finale was. THAT is how to close one chapter of a season and open a whole new one when the series returns in February."

Many critics praised Joe Morton's character Rowan Pope and his speech in the episode. Danielle Henderson from Vulture said "...for his “I’m a man, you’re a boy” speech. It was VERY DRAMATIC, but I loved it." Miranda Wicker from TV Fanatic commented, "Rowan's 'you're a boy' speech to Fitz was amazingly written and delivered. Round of applause for Joe Morton!" She continued saying that the speech was one of the two best moments of the episode and it delivered a very accurate feeling a lot of the audience already had thought about the topic saying "Rowan's belief that Olivia is Fitz' way out, his "door marked exit", was spot on. She's his escape."
