= Family Feud (song) =

2017 song by Jay-Z featuring Beyoncé

Song by Jay-Z featuring Beyoncé

from the album 4:44
- Released: January 26, 2018
- Recorded: 2017
- Genre: Hip hop; conscious hip hop; R&B
- Length: 4:11
- Label: Roc Nation
- Songwriters: Shawn Carter; Dion Wilson; Elbernita Clark; Beyoncé Knowles-Carter
- Producer: No I.D.

Music video
- "Family Feud" on YouTube

"Family Feud" is a song by American rapper Jay-Z featuring American singer Beyoncé. It is taken from Jay-Z's thirteenth studio album 4:44 (2017) and was produced by No I.D.

The song was nominated at the 60th Annual Grammy Awards for Best Rap/Sung Performance. The accompanying music video is directed by Ava DuVernay, who won the BET Award for Video Director of the Year for her work.

== Background and composition ==
A sample of "Ha Ya" by the Clark Sisters is used in the song and also interpolated by Beyoncé. Lyrically, Jay-Z criticizes old and new school rappers unfairly insulting each other's styles and feuding, while also noting how his previous affair became a liability to him ("Yeah, I'll fuck up a good thing if you let me / Let me alone, Becky").

Shortly after the song was released, American rapper Young Thug thanked Jay-Z on Instagram for encouraging old school rappers to respect the newer ones.

== Music video ==
The official music video was released on December 29, 2017. It was directed by Ava DuVernay. It begins in the year 2444, when a fight over sovereignty results in a murder. After that, the video shifts back in time through different eras. The story of a family's rise to power in the video is revealed to have begun in 2050 with a constitutional convention of the Founding Mothers led by a grown-up Blue Ivy. The video flashes back to 2018 at a church, and the song begins. In the present year, young Blue Ivy watches her parents Jay-Z and Beyoncé perform in confessional booths pulpits.

The following actors appear in the video: Michael B. Jordan, Thandiwe Newton, Trevante Rhodes, Irene Bedard, Omari Hardwick, Jessica Chastain, David Oyelowo, Emayatzy Corinealdi, America Ferrera, Aisha Hinds, Storm Reid, Henry G. Sanders, Susan Kelechi Watson (who plays an adult Blue Ivy), Brie Larson, Constance Wu, Niecy Nash, Rosario Dawson, Janet Mock, Mindy Kaling and Rashida Jones.

== Charts ==
Chart (2017)	Peak position
US Billboard Hot 100	51
US Hot R&B/Hip-Hop Songs (Billboard)	22

== Certifications ==
Region	Certification	Certified units/sales
United States (RIAA)	Gold	500,000^{‡}
^{‡} Sales+streaming figures based on certification alone.
