= Selma (soundtrack) =

Selma: Music from the Motion Picture

Soundtrack album by Various artists
- Released: December 23, 2014 (digital); January 13, 2015 (physical)
- Recorded: 2014
- Genre: Hip hop; jazz; blues; soul; orchestra
- Length: 44:07
- Label: Paramount Music

Singles from Selma: Music from the Motion Picture
- 1. "Glory" Released: December 11, 2014

Selma: Music from the Motion Picture is the soundtrack album accompanying the 2014 historical drama film of the same name directed by Ava DuVernay. The film is scored by jazz pianist Jason Moran, in his feature film scoring debut. Moran had agreed to be a part of the project, as jazz and activism being integral to each other, which brought the origins of black music in America. He composed an orchestral music which had a subtle and minimalistic approach throughout the film, except for few sequences, which needed a grandeur music.

The score was not released in full. Only three tracks of Moran's score was featured throughout the album, which consisted of incorporated music performed by artists from the 1960s. An original song, titled "Glory", performed by Common and John Legend, is a protest anthem, that refers to the 2014 Ferguson protests. The song was released by Def Jam Recordings and Columbia Records on December 11, 2014 as a single, and peaked at number 49 on the US Billboard Hot 100 commercially, upon release. It was accompanied by a music video, released the following month, and is directed by Paramount Pictures. The 13-track album was distributed by Paramount Pictures and released through Paramount Music label digitally on December 23, 2014, and physically on January 13, 2015.

The score received positive critical response, praising Moran's composition and minimalistic approach, while the soundtrack received positive commercial response. The film's music received numerous nominations at award ceremonies. The song "Glory" won multiple awards, including Best Original Song at the 87th Academy Awards and the 72nd Golden Globe Awards, as well as the award for Best Song Written for Visual Media at the 58th Annual Grammy Awards.

== Development and composition ==
Moran was brought in for scoring the film, due to his close association with Bradford Young, the film's cinematographer. When filming was nearing completion, DuVermay asked on who would score for the film, when Young recommended Moran, despite not associating with film music. According to him, "jazz and activism are so integral to each other, whether we think about the music of Max Roach, Charles Mingus, Duke Ellington, the music of the vaudeville performer Burt Williams in the early 1900′s, or the music of Paul Robeson. That link, that defiance, that comes out of the origins of jazz and blues are what we know of black music in American. It has that kind of tension and history built in to it, a process of exploring sounds from James Brown to today's artists like John Legend and Common."

Despite his jazz origins, DuVermay wanted an orchestral score for her film, which was a challenging process for Moran, but during the orchestral development, the orchestrator Matthias Gohl helped Moran to work on it. Through Selma, Moran tried to bring a subtle score, where he "had to resist the temptation, because the score needs to be "felt" more than "heard". He developed extremely simplistic music, in some sequences, including Martin Luther King Jr. and Coretta Scott's marriage to address "that state of complexity", as he thought "the way their actors David Oyelowo and Carmen Ejogo portrayed the relationship in a way that was so full of emotion that their scenes didn't need much music. It also encompassed their breaths, and the tone of the room they were in. It was almost like playing the room they were in, rather than what they were saying. Ava and I worked hard to figure out the interplay between music and dialogue, so we could get the sound just right".

The first thing, Moran discusses about the score, is where "rural music comes into conflict with the urban tunes", which results in the inclusion of the tambourine, as "there are so many cultures around the world, and the tambourine is something that anybody can beat their hand to, and have this rattle attached to it". Moran opined that blues and spiritual music are part of the southern culture, and both use same percussion, adding that "he wanted to kind of have that relation between blues and Gospel music to get the idea across of the "sacred" versus the "secular," which also represents Martin Luther King Jr." He collaborated with guitarist Martin Sewell, a regular collaborator of Moran, and played guitar for few themes.

The orchestra expands at sequences where King's marchers confront the cops at the bridge. Since it was a longer sequence, the music was broken into three parts, as Moran said: "There was the initial piece on the bridge, the conversation that happens on the bridge between the marchers, and then the confrontation with the police. Up to that moment where the police charge the marchers, it was how to look at that tension and how to represent the feeling of the police. Then there's the tension within the marchers, who are aiming to march confidently across the bridge for what could be a long journey. But first they've got to see what's on the other side. And it turns out to be pure terror. So it took us a long time to figure out what was the right mood for the sequence. We would get one part right, and then the other two would be wrong. It just took a while to figure out how to make it all work. I'm thrilled when people experience that theme there, and how the music tells you the whole story. The percussion of the marchers' feet is also a wonderful thing to imagine, even though you don't necessarily hear them entering the bridge." It further expands during King's final speech, which was the first cue he wrote for the film, where Moran had felt "emotional on watching it" as he felt "the speech just seemed to be the most current part of the film for him".

== Reception ==
=== Critical response ===
Emily St. James of Vox Media had felt that Moran's score "opts for sweeping orchestral heft as rarely as possible, choosing, instead, to focus on simple pieces featuring only a handful of instruments". According to Scott Foundas of Variety, "DuVernay's intelligent, understated approach extends to the film's musical choices: a sparingly used original score by Jason Moran and a few choice spirituals, including Sister Gertrude Morgan's "I Got the New World in My View" and Martha Bass' "Walk with Me," in lieu of the era's more familiar (and overused) pop protest songs."

=== Commercial performance ===
Chart (2014–2015)	Position
UK Compilation Albums (OCC)	74
UK Soundtrack Albums (OCC)	15
US Billboard 200	56
US Soundtrack Albums (Billboard)	5

=== Accolades ===
Award	Date of ceremony	Category	Recipients	Result	Ref.
Academy Awards	February 22, 2015	Best Original Song	John Legend and Common for "Glory"	Won	
African-American Film Critics Association	December 8, 2014	Best Music	John Legend and Common for "Glory"	Won	
BET Awards	June 28, 2015	Best Collaboration	John Legend and Common for "Glory"	Won	
Black Reel Awards	February 19, 2015	Outstanding Score – Feature	Jason Moran	Won	
Black Reel Awards	February 19, 2015	Outstanding Original Song – Feature	John Legend and Common for "Glory"	Won	
Critics' Choice Movie Awards	January 15, 2015	Best Song	John Legend, and Common for "Glory"	Won	
Golden Globe Awards	January 11, 2015	Best Original Song	John Legend and Common for "Glory"	Won	
Grammy Awards	February 18, 2016	Best Compilation Soundtrack for Visual Media	Selma	Nominated	
Grammy Awards	February 18, 2016	Best Song Written for Visual Media	John Legend and Common for "Glory"	Won	
Houston Film Critics Society	January 12, 2015	Best Original Song	John Legend and Common for "Glory"	Nominated	
Motion Picture Sound Editors	February 15, 2015	Feature Music	Julie Pearce and Clint Bennett	Nominated	

== Track listing ==
No.	Title	Performer(s)	Length
1.	"Glory"	Common; John Legend	4:32
2.	"Ole Man Trouble"	Otis Redding	2:37
3.	"I've Got the New World in My View"	Gertrude Morgan	4:32
4.	"Keep on Pushing"	The Impressions	2:31
5.	"One Morning Soon"	Joyce Collins; Johnita Collins	3:08
6.	"Alabama Blues"	J. B. Lenoir	3:12
7.	"Walk with Me"	Martha Bass	2:48
8.	"House of the Rising Sun"	Duane Eddy	2:44
9.	"Take My Hand, Precious Lord"	Ledisi	3:23
10.	"Yesterday Was Hard on All of Us"	Fink	5:02
11.	"Cager Lee"	Jason Moran	1:42
12.	"Final Speech"	Jason Moran	3:46
13.	"Bloody Sunday Parts 1-3"	Jason Moran	4:10
Total length:			44:07
