= YOLO (Scandal) =

- Scandal episode
- Episode no.: Season 3 Episode 9
- Directed by: Oliver Bokelberg
- Written by: Chris Van Dusen
- Original air date: December 5, 2013

Guest appearances
- Joe Morton as Rowan "Eli" Pope; Kate Burton as Sally Langston; Dan Bucatinsky as James Novak

Episode chronology
← Previous "Vermont is For Lovers, Too"	Next → "A Door Marked Exit"

"YOLO" is the ninth episode of the third season of the American television series Scandal. It premiered on December 5, 2013 on ABC.

== Plot ==
Huck begins to torture Quinn and is stopped by a phone call from Olivia telling him that her mother is alive. He warns her to leave her apartment with her mother and go to a safe house and goes to join her though not before ripping out one of Quinn's teeth in anticipation of the torture to follow.

At the safe house Huck and Jake realize that Olivia's mother Maya still has a tracker in her body. They rip it out and manage to flee the scene before members of B613 manage to track them down. The gladiators manage to acquire false identity papers for Maya under the name Marie Wallace but before they can get Maya to an airport they realize that the No Fly List has been updated with Maya's fake name.

Olivia calls Fitz and he agrees to help her smuggle her mother out of the country. As Maya waves goodbye from aboard the plane Olivia flashes back to a moment in her childhood where someone called the house asking for "Marie". She realizes that Marie Wallace is her mother's real name and she is a terrorist and her father was trying to protect her from her. She tells this to Huck who warns her they have a problem since after torturing Quinn he allowed her to be found by Charlie if she promised to get close to Rowan Pope and kill him. At B-613 headquarters Quinn holds a needle in her hand while talking to an unsuspecting Rowan.

Meanwhile, Sally Langston has decided to run for presidency even agreeing that midway through the race she will become pro-choice in order to assure her win. She announces her decision to Fitz who rebukes Cyrus for not having stopped her. Cyrus, who was confronted by James for using him as a rent-boy to entrap Sally's husband, decides to use the pictures of James having sex with Sally's husband to threaten Sally. She laughs off his threat but later calls him telling him she has committed a sin while standing beside the inert body of her husband who appears to be dead.

== Cultural references ==
The title refers to the popular acronym YOLO that stands for "You Only Live Once".

== Production ==
Speaking on the torture scenes of her character Quinn, actress Katie Lowes remarked that "when I got this script I didn't sleep for three and a half weeks."
