= Vermont Is for Lovers, Too =

- Scandal episode
- Episode no.: Season 3 Episode 8
- Directed by: Ava DuVernay
- Written by: Mark Wilding
- Original air date: November 21, 2013

Guest appearances
- Khandi Alexander as Maya Lewis; Joe Morton as Rowan "Eli" Pope; Lisa Kudrow as Josie Marcus; George Newbern as Charlie; Dan Bucatinsky as James Novak

Episode chronology
| ← Previous "Everything's Coming Up Mellie" | Next → "YOLO" |

"Vermont Is for Lovers, Too" is the eighth episode of the third season of Scandal. It premiered on November 21, 2013 in the U.S.

== Plot ==
Rowan visits Maya's cell and informs her that since Olivia has been asking questions about her he is going to move her to a more remote location. She begs him to let her see her daughter before she's moved and he refuses her request. In her cell Maya chews through her wrists and lands in the medical ward, delaying her move. While she is recuperating Rowan brings her news articles highlighting Olivia's achievements. When Maya asks to see more personal photos she is horrified to discover that there are none and that Rowan claims to have grown apart from Olivia when she was 12.

Cyrus and Mellie hatch a plan to entrap Sally's husband in a sex-scandal using Cyrus's husband James as bait. Cyrus arranges an interview between Sally's husband Daniel and James and encourages James to dress casually and conduct the interview at Daniel's house. Mellie warns Cyrus that the affair could become real but Cyrus is confident that James will rebuff Daniel's advances. However, when Daniel attempts to have sex with him James realizes that Cyrus set up the whole scenario and decides to have sex with him anyway. Cyrus is sent the pictures of James and Daniel having sex and realizes that Mellie's prediction came true.

Meanwhile, the gladiators are split between trying to discover who killed the security guard in "Everything's Coming Up Mellie" and managing Josie Marcus's campaign. Huck and Jake try to uncover security footage of the night that the guard was killed while Quinn does everything in her power to try to sabotage them from finding out. However at night when she returns to her apartment she finds Huck lying in wait for her with his torture devices ready, wanting to know why she has been lying to everyone after seeing her kill the security guard in the surveillance footage.

During the night Fitz asks to see Olivia and brings her to a house in Vermont. After they argue he informs her that he built the house with her in mind for the future he wanted them to have together. They spend the night together and she asks him not to sell the house.

Josie's daughter's house has been broken into and a laptop containing campaign material has disappeared. The laptop is discovered at Governor Reston's campaign headquarters however material had been removed from it and it soon becomes clear that Candice planted the laptop in order to boost Josie's campaign. Olivia urges Josie to publicly fire Candice to make an example of her but instead she takes responsibility for Candice's actions and drops out of the race.

Going home at night Olivia hears someone calling her name and recognizes her mother, who managed to escape from B613 and has managed to find her.

== Cultural references ==
The title references Virginia's tourism slogan Virginia Is for Lovers.

== Production ==
Director Ava DuVernay was announced as the director of the episode in July 2013. The episode is also notable for being the first time that a black woman (DuVernay) directed a television show starring a black woman (Kerry Washington) that was also created by a black woman (Shonda Rhimes) on one of the Big Three television networks.
