= I Will Follow (film) =

2010 film directed by Ava DuVernay

- Film poster
- Directed by: Ava DuVernay
- Written by: Ava DuVernay
- Produced by: Ava DuVernay; Molly Mayeux
- Starring: Salli Richardson-Whitfield; Omari Hardwick; Blair Underwood; Beverly Todd
- Cinematography: Miguel Bunster
- Edited by: Spencer Averick
- Music by: Kathryn Bostic
- Production companies: Kandoo Films; Forward Movement
- Distributed by: ARRAY
- Release dates: September 18, 2010 (Urbanworld Film Festival); March 11, 2011 (United States)
- Running time: 88 minutes
- Country: United States
- Language: English

I Will Follow is a 2010 American independent drama film written and directed by Ava DuVernay, who also produced the film with Molly Mayeux. It stars Salli Richardson-Whitfield, Omari Hardwick, Blair Underwood and Beverly Todd.

== Plot ==
Maye is a successful artist who has taken a leave from work to care for her ill aunt, Amanda. As the film begins, Maye is moving out of the home she once shared with Amanda after her death and contemplating her relationships, her career, her past and her future.

== Cast ==
- Salli Richardson-Whitfield as Maye
- Omari Hardwick as Troy
- Michole Briana White as Fran
- Dijan Talton as Raven
- Tracie Thoms as Tiffany
- Damone Roberts as Damone
- Blair Underwood as Evan
- Beverly Todd as Amanda
  - Kiki Walls as Young Amanda
- Phalana Tiller as Christine
- Tony Perez as Tuliau
- Ramon Leon as Ramon
- Royale Watkins as Roy
- Owen H.M. Smith as Chuck
- Robert Silver as Benjamin
- J. R. Ramirez as Percy
- Kiara Muhammad as Ronda, Fran's Daughter
- Scotty Noyd Jr. as Fran's Son
- Olivia Alvarado as Fran's Baby

== Production ==
I Will Follow was shot in 11 days on location in Topanga Canyon, California, on a $50,000 budget. Its title was taken from the U2 song of the same name.

== Release ==
I Will Follow made its world premiere in New York City at the 2010 Urbanworld Film Festival, where it won audience honors. It also played at the 2010 Chicago International Film Festival and the 2010 AFI Film Festival. The film had a limited release on March 11, 2011.

== Critical reception ==
On review aggregator Rotten Tomatoes, I Will Follow has an approval rating of 82% based on 11 reviews, with an average rating of 7.5/10.

Film critic Roger Ebert gave the film three and a half out of four stars, describing it as "a universal story about universal emotions".

== Accolades ==
- African-American Film Critics Association
  - 2011, Best Screenplay: Ava DuVernay (Winner)
- Black Reel Awards
  - 2012, Best Screenplay: Ava DuVernay (Nominated)
  - 2012, Best Director: Ava DuVernay (Nominated)
- Image Awards
  - 2012, Outstanding Independent Motion Picture (Nominated)

== See also ==
- List of black films of the 2010s
