= BET Award for Video Director of the Year =

American entertainment award category

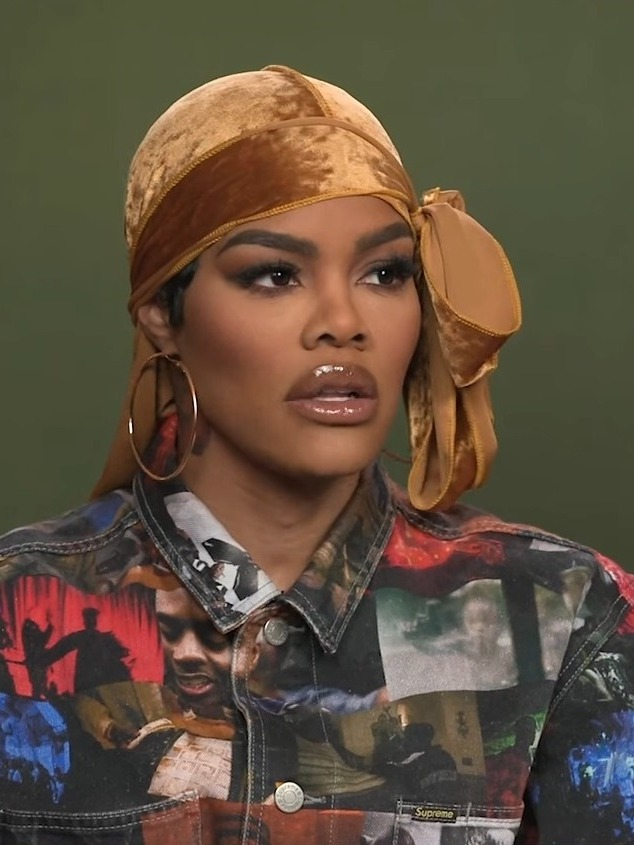
- Teyana Taylor is the most recent recipient
- Country: United States
- Presented by: BET Awards
- First award: 2008
- Currently held by: Teyana Taylor (2026)

Highlights
- Most wins: Beyoncé & Teyana Taylor (3)
- Most nominations: Benny Boom (16)

The BET Award for Video Director of the Year is given to the best directors of music videos released in the same or previous year. The category was first created in 2008 and since its conception. Beyoncé and Teyana Taylor are tied as the all-time winners in this category with three wins each. Benny Boom has received the most nominations with sixteen each.

== Winners and nominees ==
Winners are listed first and highlighted in bold.

=== 2000s ===
Year	Director	Ref
2008
2008	**Erykah Badu**	
2008	Benny Boom	
2008	Gil Green	
2008	Chris Robinson	
2008	Evans Teollian	
2009
2009	**Benny Boom**	
2009	Rik Cordero	
2009	Gil Green	
2009	Chris Robinson	
2009	Hype Williams	

=== 2010s ===
Year	Director	Video	Ref
2010
2010	**Anthony Mandler**		
2010	Benny Boom		
2010	Gil Green		
2010	Chris Robinson		
2010	Evans Teollian		
2011
2011	**Chris Robinson**		
2011	Benny Boom		
2011	Mr. Boomtown		
2011	Kanye West		
2011	Hype Williams		
2012
2012	**Beyoncé and Alan Ferguson**		
2012	Benny Boom		
2012	Chris Brown and Godfrey Taberez		
2012	Kanye West		
2012	Hype Williams		
2013
2013	**Benny Boom**		
2013	ASAP Rocky and Sam Lecca		
2013	Evans Teollian		
2013	Dre Films		
2013	Hype Williams		
2014
2014	**Hype Williams**		
2014	Benny Boom		
2014	Chris Brown		
2014	Director X		
2014	Colin Tilley		
2015
2015	**Beyoncé, Ed Burke and Todd Tourso**		
2015	Evans Teollian		
2015	Chris Robinson		
2015	Fatima Robinson		
2015	Hype Williams		
2016
2016	**Director X**		
2016	Benny Boom		
2016	Chris Brown		
2016	Colin Tilley		
2016	Hype Williams		
2017
2017	**Kahlil Joseph and Beyoncé**	**"Sorry"**	
2017	Benny Boom	"CRZY"	
2017	Bruno Mars and Jonathan Lia	"That's What I Like"	
2017	Director X	"Like I Would"	
2017	Hype Williams	"Gucci Snakes"	
2018
2018	**Ava DuVernay**		
2018	Benny Boom		
2018	Director X		
2018	Chris Brown		
2018	Dave Meyers		
2019
2019	**Karena Evans**		
2019	Benny Boom		
2019	Colin Tilley		
2019	Dave Meyers		
2019	Hype Williams		

=== 2020s ===
Year	Director	Ref
2020
2020	**Teyana Taylor**	
2020	Benny Boom	
2020	Cole Bennett	
2020	Dave Meyers	
2020	Director X	
2020	Eif Rivera	
2021
2021	**Bruno Mars and Florent Déchard**	
2021	Benny Boom	
2021	Cole Bennett	
2021	Colin Tilley	
2021	Dave Meyers	
2021	Hype Williams	
2022
2022	**Anderson .Paak**	
2022	Benny Boom	
2022	Beyoncé and Dikayl Rimmasch	
2022	Director X	
2022	Hype Williams	
2022	Missy Elliott	
2023
2023	**Teyana Taylor**	
2023	A$AP Rocky for AWGE	
2023	Benny Boom	
2023	Burna Boy	
2023	Cole Bennett	
2023	Dave Free and Kendrick Lamar	
2023	Director X	
2024
2024	**Cole Bennett**	
2024	Benny Boom	
2024	Child.	
2024	Dave Meyers	
2024	Janelle Monáe & Alan Ferguson	
2024	Offset	
2024	Tems	
2024	Tyler, the Creator	

== Multiple wins and nominations ==
=== Wins ===
3 wins

- Beyoncé
- Teyana Taylor

2 wins

- Benny Boom

=== Nominations ===
16 nominations

- Benny Boom

11 nominations

- Hype Williams

7 nominations

- Director X

5 nominations

- Chris Robinson

4 nominations

- Cole Bennett
- Beyoncé
- Chris Brown
- Dave Meyers

3 nominations

- Gil Green
- Teyana Taylor

2 nominations

- Alan Ferguson
- Bruno Mars
- Colin Tilley
- Kanye West

== See also ==
- BET Award for Video of the Year
