= Ava DuVernay =

American filmmaker (born 1972)

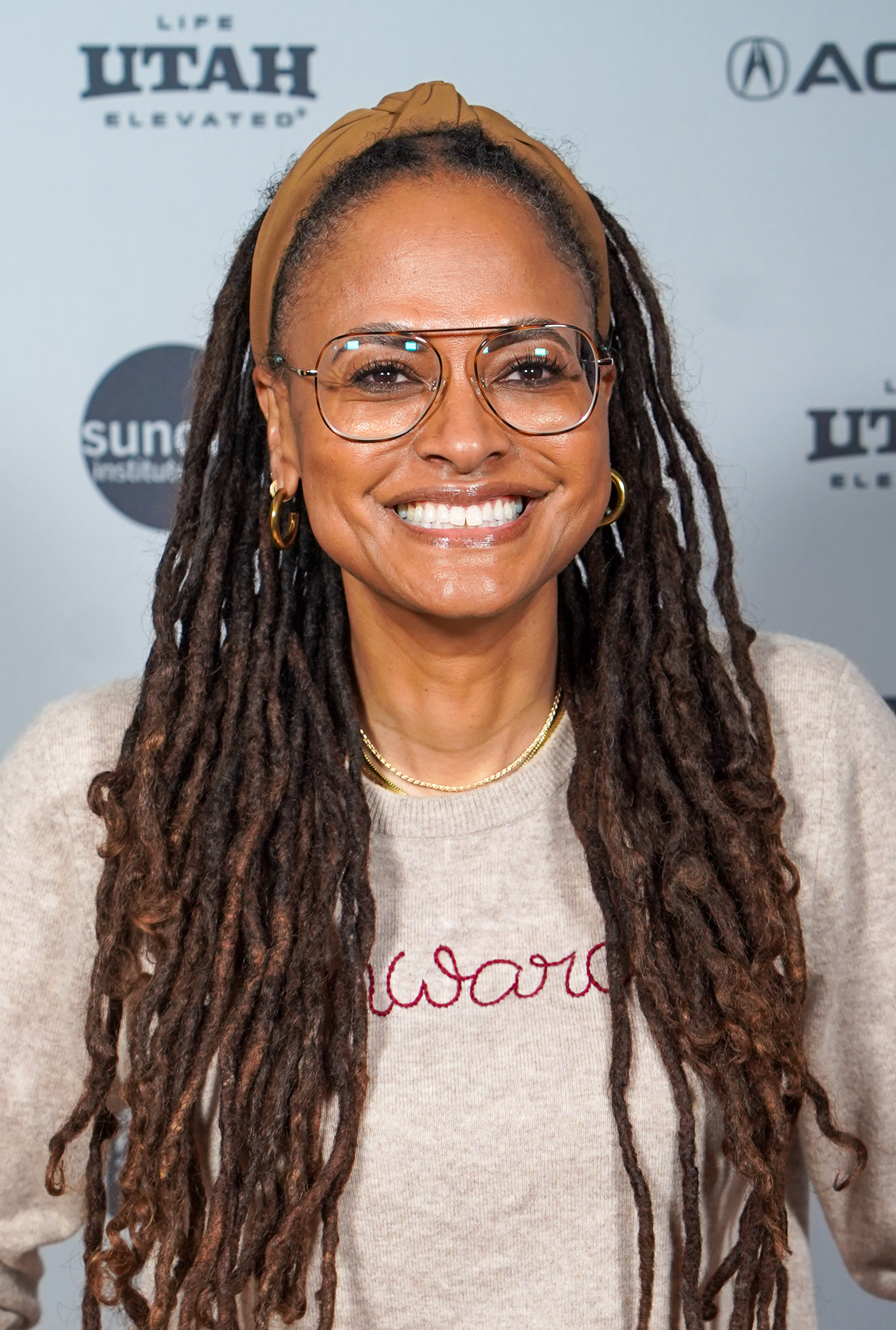
- DuVernay in 2026
- Born: Ava Marie DuVernay; August 24, 1972 (age 54); Long Beach, California, U.S.
- Education: University of California, Los Angeles (BA)
- Occupations: Director; producer; screenwriter; film publicist
- Awards: Full list

Ava Marie DuVernay (born August 24, 1972) is an American filmmaker. She is a recipient of two Primetime Emmy Awards, two NAACP Image Awards, a BAFTA Film Award, and a BAFTA TV Award, as well as a nominee for an Academy Award and Golden Globe. In 2011, she founded her independent distribution company ARRAY. After making her directoral debut, I Will Follow (2010), DuVernay won the directing award in the U.S. dramatic competition at the 2012 Sundance Film Festival for her second feature film Middle of Nowhere, becoming the first black woman to win the award.

For her work on Selma (2014), a biopic about Martin Luther King Jr., DuVernay became the first African-American woman to be nominated for a Golden Globe Award for Best Director; the film went on to be nominated for the Academy Award for Best Picture. Her other film credits include the Academy Award-nominated Netflix documentary 13th (2016) and the Disney fantasy film A Wrinkle in Time (2018), the latter making her the first African-American woman to direct a film with a budget of $100 million, which also joined the List of biggest box-office bombs. In 2023, she directed the biographical film Origin based on Isabel Wilkerson's book Caste: The Origins of Our Discontents (2020).

DuVernay's television credits include the OWN drama series Queen Sugar (2016) and two Netflix drama limited series: When They See Us (2019), based on the 1989 Central Park jogger case and Colin in Black & White (2021), based on the teenage years of NFL player Colin Kaepernick. In 2017, DuVernay was included on the annual Time 100 list of the most influential people in the world. In 2020, she was elected to the Academy of Motion Pictures Arts and Sciences board of governors as part of the directors branch.

== Early life and education ==
Ava Marie DuVernay was born on August 24, 1972, in Long Beach, California. She was raised by her mother, Darlene (née Sexton), an educator, and her stepfather, Murray Maye. The surname of her biological father, Joseph Marcel DuVernay III, originates with Louisiana Creole ancestry. She grew up in Lynwood, California. She has four siblings.

During her summer vacations, she would travel to the childhood home of her stepfather, which was not far from Selma, Alabama. DuVernay said that these summers influenced the making of Selma, as her father had witnessed the 1965 Selma to Montgomery marches.

Raised Catholic, in 1990 DuVernay graduated from Saint Joseph High School in Lakewood. At the University of California, Los Angeles (UCLA), she was a double BA major in English literature and African-American studies. DuVernay is an honorary member of Alpha Kappa Alpha sorority.

In 2021, DuVernay was awarded an honorary Doctor of Fine Arts degree from Yale University.

== Career ==
=== 1991–2008: Early work ===
DuVernay reportedly did not pick up a camera until she was 32. DuVernay's first interest was journalism, a choice influenced by an internship with CBS News. She was assigned to help cover the O.J. Simpson murder trial. DuVernay became disillusioned with journalism, however, and decided to move into public relations, working as a junior publicist at 20th Century Fox, Savoy Pictures, and a few other PR agencies. She opened her own public relations firm, The DuVernay Agency, also known as DVAPR, in 1999.

Through DVAPR she provided marketing and PR services to the entertainment and lifestyle industry, working on campaigns for movies and television shows, such as Lumumba, Spy Kids, Shrek 2, The Terminal, Collateral, and Dreamgirls.

Other ventures launched by DuVernay include Urban Beauty Collective, a promotional network that began in 2003 and had more than 10,000 African-American beauty salons and barbershops in 16 U.S. cities, expanded to 20 in 2008. They were mailed a free monthly Access Hollywood-style promotion program called UBC-TV, the African-American blog hub Urban Thought Collective in 2008, Urban Eye, a two-minute long weekday celebrity and entertainment news show distributed to radio stations, and HelloBeautiful, a digital platform for millennial women of color.

In 2005, over the Christmas holiday, DuVernay decided to take $6,000 and make her first film, a short called Saturday Night Life. Based on her mother's experiences, the 12-minute film was about an uplifting trip by a struggling single mother (Melissa De Sousa) and her three kids to a local Los Angeles discount grocery store. The film toured the festival circuit and was broadcast on February 6, 2007, as part of Showtime's Black Filmmaker Showcase.

DuVernay next explored making documentaries, because they can be done on a smaller budget than fiction films, and she could learn the trade while doing so. In 2007, she directed the short Compton in C Minor, for which she "challenged herself to capture Compton in only two hours and present whatever she found." The following year, she made her feature directorial debut with the alternative hip hop documentary This Is the Life, a history of LA's Good Life Cafe's arts movement, in which she participated as part of the duo Figures of Speech. This is the Life won audience awards at the ReelWorld Film Festival in Toronto, the Los Angeles Pan-African Film Festival, the Hollywood Black Film Festival, and the Langston Hughes African American Film Festival in Seattle.

=== 2010–2013: Film debut and breakthrough ===
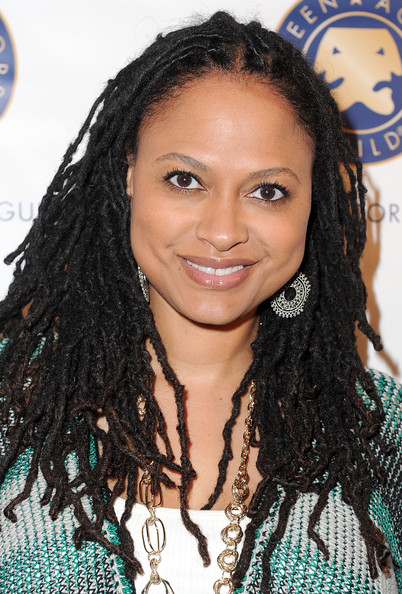
DuVernay at the 2010 AFI Film Festival

In 2010, DuVernay directed three TV documentaries. The first, two-hour concert film TV One Night Only: Live from the Essence Music Festival, was a mix of live performances and behind-the-scenes vignettes. It aired August 28, 2010, on TV One and showcases the U.S.'s largest annual African-American entertainment gathering, the Essence Music Festival. In 2010 it was held July 2–4 in New Orleans. Two days later, BET premiered its first original music documentary, My Mic Sounds Nice: A Truth About Women and Hip Hop, a 41-minute long history of female hip hop artists. On Thanksgiving 2010, TV One showed DuVernay's 44-minute documentary special Essence Presents: Faith Through the Storm, about two Black sisters who reclaimed their lives after personal devastation during Hurricane Katrina. "It was done for a client, for Essence. They wanted to talk about how faith helped them through, that was very important to them. So it is interspersed with gospel music, images of Katrina, their home and family."

I Will Follow

In 2011, DuVernay's first narrative feature film, I Will Follow, a drama starring Salli Richardson-Whitfield, was released theatrically. DuVernay's aunt Denise Sexton was the inspiration for the film. In an interview, DuVernay talked about how her real life experiences differed from the film: "I was a caregiver for my aunt, Denise Sexton, in the last year and a half of her life. She was diagnosed with stage four breast cancer. She was a fighter and was active in her treatment to the end, which was different than the character in the film who wants to fight in a different way." The film cost DuVernay $50,000 and was made in 14 days. Roger Ebert called it "one of the best films I've seen about coming to terms with the death of a loved one." I Will Follow was an official selection of AFI Fest, Pan-African Film Festival, Urbanworld and Chicago International Film Festival.

It wasn't until after I Will Follow that DuVernay fully left her job in publicity. DuVernay stated: "I knew that as a Black woman in this industry, I wouldn't have people knocking down my door to give me money for my projects, so I was happy to make them on the side while working my day job."

Middle of Nowhere

In the summer of 2011, DuVernay began production on her second narrative feature film, Middle of Nowhere, from a script she had written in 2003 but was unable to finance. The film drew from her own experiences growing up in Compton and Inglewood. The story focuses on the wife of an incarcerated man who is serving a 10-year sentence. She drops out of medical school in order to have more time and emotional energy to give to her incarcerated spouse. The film explores how the families of the incarcerated are also victims of the system and shows how commonly this burden of incarceration falls upon women of color. In an interview with the LA Times, DuVernay touched on her inspiration for the film, "The idea of looking at the victims of incarceration – the mothers, sisters and daughters -- really came out of knowing women who were going through it."

The film had its world premiere on January 20 at the 2012 Sundance Film Festival, where it played in U.S. dramatic competition. It garnered the U.S. Directing Award: Dramatic for DuVernay. She was the first African-American woman to win the prize. DuVernay also won the 2012 Independent Spirit John Cassavetes Award for her work on the film.

DuVernay was commissioned by the Smithsonian's National Museum of African American History and Culture to create a film about African-American history. Her August 28: A Day in the Life of a People explores six historical events that happened on the same date, August 28, in different years. It debuted at the museum's opening on September 24, 2016. The 22-minute film stars Lupita Nyong'o, Don Cheadle, Regina King, David Oyelowo, Angela Bassett, Michael Ealy, Gugu Mbatha-Raw, André Holland and Glynn Turman. Events depicted include William IV's royal assent to the UK Slavery Abolition Act in 1833, the 1955 lynching of 14-year-old Emmett Till in Mississippi, the release of Motown's first number-one song, "Please Mr. Postman" by The Marvellettes, Rev. Martin Luther King Jr.'s 1963 I Have a Dream speech, the landfall of Hurricane Katrina in 2005, and the night Senator Barack Obama accepted the Democratic nomination for president at the 2008 Democratic National Convention.

Michael T. Martin says, "DuVernay is among the vanguard of a new generation of Black filmmakers who are the busily undeterred catalyst for what may very well be a Black film renaissance in the making." He further speaks of DuVernay's mission and "call to action" which constitutes a strategy "to further and foster the Black cinematic image in an organized and consistent way, and to not have to defer and ask permission to traffic our films: to be self-determining."

The "DuVernay test" is the racial equivalent of the Bechdel test (for women in movies), as first suggested by Guardian writers Nadia and Leila Latif and then by The New York Times film critic Manohla Dargis in January 2016, asking whether "blacks and other minorities have fully realized lives rather than serve as scenery in white stories." It aims to point out the lack of people of color in Hollywood movies, through a measure of their importance to a particular movie or the lack of a gratuitous link to white actors.

In 2013, DuVernay partnered with Miu Miu as part of their Women's Tales film series. Her short film The Door starred actress Gabrielle Union and reunited DuVernay with her Middle of Nowhere star Emayatzy Corinealdi. The film premiered online in February 2013 and was presented at the Venice Days sidebar of the 70th Venice International Film Festival in August. Also in August 2013, DuVernay released, through Vimeo, a second branded short film entitled Say Yes. The film was sponsored by cosmetic brand Fashion Fair and starred Kali Hawk and Lance Gross with Julie Dash, Victoria Mahoney, Lorraine Toussaint and Issa Rae appearing as extras. ESPN commissioned DuVernay to produce and direct Venus Vs., a documentary on Venus Williams's fight for equal prize money. This was to be included in their film series Nine for IX, which aired on July 2, 2013. DuVernay also directed the John Legend episode of the performance-and-interview series HelloBeautiful Interludes Live, which was shown September 14, 2013, on TV One as the series' broadcast premiere. She also directed the eighth episode of the third season of the political thriller television series Scandal. The episode, titled "Vermont is For Lovers, Too", premiered on November 21, 2013, on ABC.

Selma

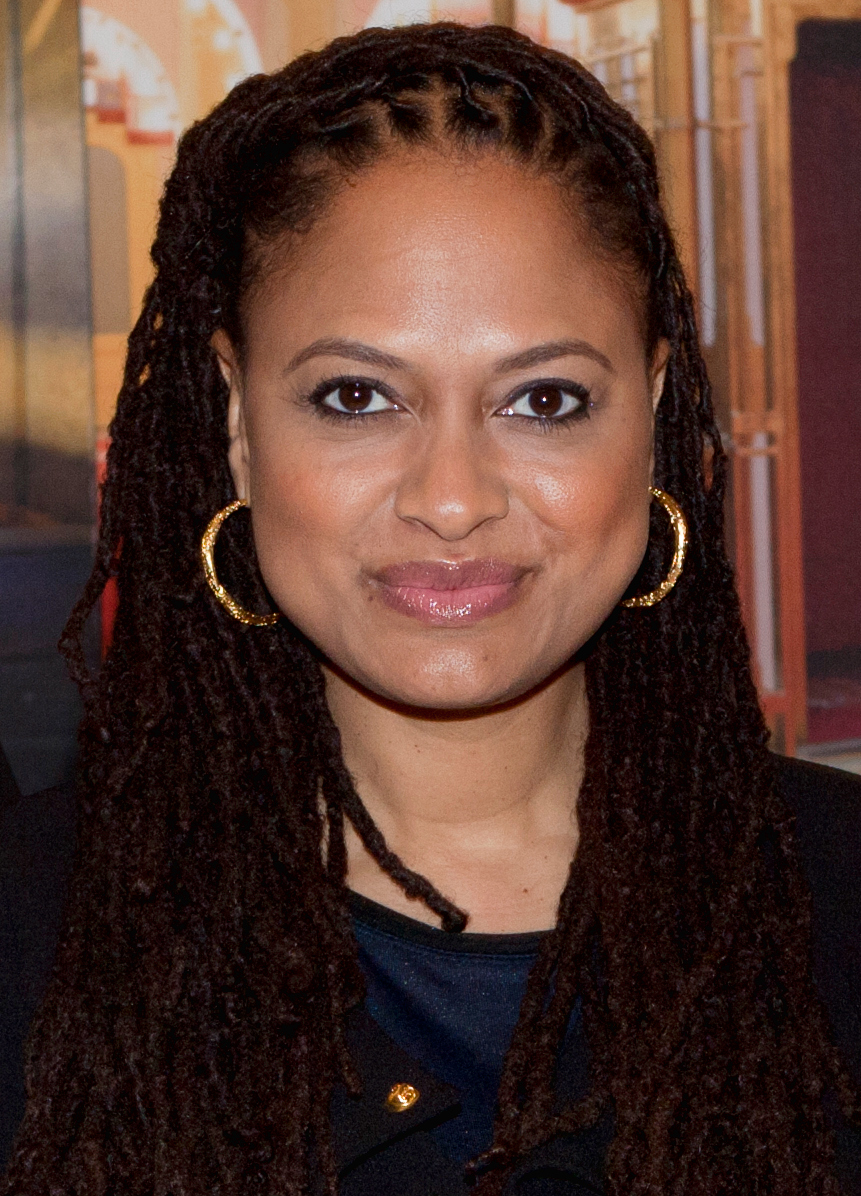
DuVernay in 2015

DuVernay directed Selma, a $20 million budget dramatic film about Martin Luther King Jr., President Lyndon B. Johnson, and the 1965 Selma to Montgomery march for voting rights. The movie, produced by Plan B Entertainment, was released on December 25, 2014, to critical acclaim. DuVernay in an interview at Indiana University stated that Selma would be "the first major feature film in theaters that has anything to do with King's essential character" making it a historical landmark in the history of biopics. She made uncredited re-writes of most of the original screenplay by Paul Webb in order to emphasize King and the people of Selma as central figures. In an October 2020 interview on The Carlos Watson Show, DuVernay claimed that she, not Webb, was the principal writer, saying that the biggest mistake of her career was allowing Webb "to take credit for writing Selma when I wrote it. In response to criticism by some historians and media sources who accused her of irresponsibly rewriting history to portray her own agenda, DuVernay said that the film is "not a documentary. I'm not a historian. I'm a storyteller."

The film was nominated for Best Picture and Best Original Song, but not Best Director, at the 2014 Academy Awards. The lack of diversity among the Oscar nominations for 2014 was the subject of much press, especially on Twitter. This film was the only one directed by a person of color that was nominated for the 87th Academy Awards. The award for Best Original Song went to "Glory" from Selma. DuVernay said that she had not expected to be nominated as director, so the omission did not really bother her, but she was disappointed that actor David Oyelowo, who portrayed King, was not nominated as Best Actor. She said that the obstacles to people of color being represented in the Academy Awards were systemic.

After Selma, DuVernay was approached by executives to direct Marvel's first film about a superhero of color, Black Panther, but she passed. In an interview with Essence DuVernay provided insight on why she passed on the project: "I think I'll just say we had different ideas about what the story would be. Marvel has a certain way of doing things and I think they're fantastic and a lot of people love what they do. I loved that they reached out to me." She also expressed her support for the project moving forward, "I love the character of Black Panther, the nation of Wakanda and all that that could be visually. I wish them well and will be first in line to see it."

In 2015, Apple Music and their ad agency Translation hired DuVernay to helm a series of three commercials starring Mary J. Blige, Taraji P. Henson and Kerry Washington. The first ad, Chapter 1, premiered during Fox's Emmy broadcast on September 20, 2015. Chapter 2 and Chapter 3 debuted in November 2015 and February 2016, respectively. In 2015, DuVernay executive produced and directed the CBS civil rights crime drama pilot For Justice, starring Anika Noni Rose. It was not picked up for distribution. That same year, DuVernay announced she would be creating and executive producing the drama series Queen Sugar, based on Natalie Baszile's novel. Queen Sugar premiered September 6, 2016, on Oprah Winfrey Network to critical acclaim. DuVernay wrote four episodes and directed two. On August 1, 2016, the series was renewed for a second season ahead of its television premiere; it aired in a two-night premiere on June 20 and 21, 2017. The series was renewed for a third season on July 26, 2017. In August 2018, OWN renewed the series for a fourth season, which premiered on June 12, 2019.

=== 2016–present: Career expansion ===
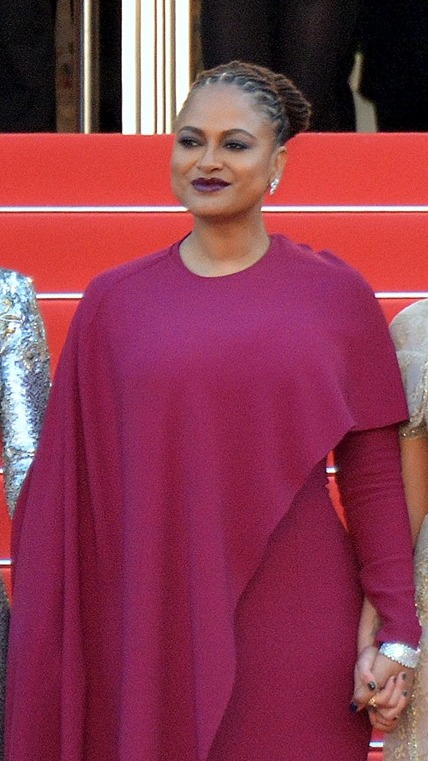
Ava DuVernay at the 71st annual Cannes Film Festival in 2018

13th

In July 2016, the New York Film Festival made the surprise announcement that 13th, a documentary directed by DuVernay, would open the festival. Until the announcement no mention of the film had been made by either DuVernay or Netflix, the film's distributor. Centered on race in the United States criminal justice system, the film is titled after the Thirteenth Amendment to the United States Constitution, which outlawed slavery (except as punishment for a crime). DuVernay's documentary opens with the statement that 25 percent of the people in the world who are incarcerated are incarcerated in the U.S., and argues that slavery has been effectively perpetuated in the U.S. through disproportionate mass incarceration of people of color. The film features several prominent activists, politicians, and public figures, such as Bryan Stevenson, Angela Davis, Van Jones, Newt Gingrich, Cory Booker, Henry Louis Gates Jr., Michelle Alexander, and others, who discuss such issues as convict leasing, the war on drugs, and disproportionate arrests, convictions and sentencing of minorities. It was also the first critically acclaimed documentary to highlight the story of Kalief Browder.

It was released on October 7, 2016, on Netflix. 13th garnered acclaim from film critics and has a 97% rating on Rotten Tomatoes based on 94 reviews. The critical consensus says: "13th strikes at the heart of America's tangled racial history, offering observations as incendiary as they are calmly controlled." In a review from Awards Circuit, Angela Davis said "13th is probably the most important movie you'll ever see." In 2017, the film was nominated for an Academy Award for Best Documentary Feature at the 89th Oscars; DuVernay became the first Black woman to be nominated by the academy as a director in a feature category. The film also won a Peabody Award in 2017 and a Columbia Journalism School duPont Award in 2018. Her music video for the Jay-Z ft. Beyoncé song "Family Feud" premiered December 29, 2017, on Tidal.

A Wrinkle in Time

In 2010, it was announced that Disney carried the film rights to Madeleine L'Engle's 1962 novel A Wrinkle in Time which follows a young girl traveling through space and time. Following the success of Tim Burton's Alice in Wonderland, Disney announced the hiring of Jeff Stockwell to write the screenplay for Cary Granat and his new Bedrock Studios. Granat had previously worked with Disney on the Chronicles of Narnia and Bridge to Terabithia films. On August 5, 2014, Jennifer Lee was announced as the screenwriter, taking over from Stockwell, who had written the first draft. On February 8, 2016, it was reported that DuVernay had been offered a chance to direct the film, and she was confirmed as director later that same month.

A Wrinkle in Time began filming in November 2016. Directing this film made DuVernay the first African-American woman to direct a live-action film with a budget of over $100 million, and the second woman to do so after Patty Jenkins (who directed Wonder Woman). The film was released in March 2018 to mixed reviews, with critics "taking issue with the film's heavy use of CGI and numerous plot holes" while "celebrating its message of female empowerment and diversity." The movie brought in $33 million in its opening weekend, second at the box office behind Black Panther and made the list for the top 100 grossing movies of 2018, making DuVernay one of only four female directors that made the list that year. Nonetheless, due to its large budget, the film was a box-office bomb, with a reported loss of $130.6 million at the box office.

When They See Us

On July 6, 2017, it was announced that Netflix had given the production When They See Us a series order consisting of four episodes. The series was created by DuVernay, who served as executive producer, co-writer, and director. Other executive producers credited, include Jeff Skoll, Jonathan King, Oprah Winfrey, Jane Rosenthal and Berry Welsh. Production companies involved with the series consisted of Participant Media, Harpo Films, and Tribeca Productions. The series premiered on Netflix on May 31, 2019. Upon its release, the miniseries received universal acclaim. On June 25, 2019, Netflix announced that the miniseries had been streamed by over 23 million viewers within its first month of release. It received a record 16 Emmy nominations, for writing, directing, and acting for stars and supporting actors.

Origin

In October 2020, her next film, Origin, an adaptation of Isabel Wilkerson's book Caste: The Origins of Our Discontents, was officially announced for Netflix. Netflix later exited the project. The film premiered at the Venice International Film Festival where it competed for the Golden Lion. This made DuVernay the first African American woman to have a film compete for the Golden Lion. The film received critical acclaim and was distributed by Neon.

==== Upcoming projects ====
Ava DuVernay at the 2026 New York Film Festival for 14th

In 2013, DuVernay announced development on a narrative feature film entitled Part of the Sky and set in Compton. In 2015, it was announced that DuVernay would be writing, producing, and directing a fictional account which will focus on the "social and environmental" aspects of Hurricane Katrina while including a love story and a murder mystery. David Oyelowo was said to be part of the project. In 2018, it was announced that DuVernay would be directing a New Gods film for the DC Extended Universe. On May 29, 2019, DuVernay announced that she and Tom King would co-write the film. The movie was no longer moving forward by April 2021.

On October 29, 2018, it was announced that DuVernay would be working with the estate of Prince to make a documentary covering his life for Netflix. However, in August 2019, DuVernay quit as director due to "creative differences". On June 29, 2020, Netflix announced a six-episode series, created by DuVernay and Colin Kaepernick, titled Colin in Black & White, centering on Kaepernick's youth and various events in his life. On February 11, 2020, news reports speculated about DuVernay possibly co-producing and directing a Nipsey Hussle documentary for Netflix.

It was reported in July 2026 that a "sequel of sorts" to her acclaimed documentary 13th, entitled 14th, about the Fourteenth Amendment, will premiere at the 2026 New York Film Festival in September.

== Production company ==
In 2010, DuVernay founded African-American Film Festival Releasing Movement (AFFRM), her own company to distribute films made by or focusing on Black people. DuVernay refers to AFFRM as "not so much a business, but a call to action." Although she sees building strong business foundations for films is a priority, DuVernay has said that she stresses that the driving force of the organization is activism. In 2015 the company rebranded itself under the name ARRAY, promising a new focus on women filmmakers as well.

DuVernay also owns Forward Movement, a film and television production company.

== Podcast, public speaking, and advocacy ==
In September 2013, DuVernay started a podcast series called The Call-In, a series of phone conversations recorded by AFFRM of Black filmmakers of feature narrative and documentary work. DuVernay talked about her goals with The Call-In: "For people of color and women filmmakers, so often the questions we get asked are about being a woman or a person of color. So The Call-In was a space where we could just talk about craft."

On October 27, 2013, DuVernay gave one of the Executive Keynote addresses for Film Independent, a non-profit organization that produces the Film Independent Spirit Awards and the Los Angeles Film Festival, at their 2013 Film Independent Form, a three-day event. She was one of two keynote speakers along with the chief executive officer of Netflix, Ted Sarandos.

DuVernay, in a keynote address at the 2015 SXSW Film Festival, shared that she was the seventh person asked to direct Selma and described her experience at the 2015 Oscars, while being an honor to attend, was just "a room in L.A."

In February 2018 it was announced that DuVernay, along with producer Dan Lin and Los Angeles Mayor Eric Garcetti, had launched the Evolve Entertainment Fund. The fund's mission is to promote inclusion and provide an opportunity for under-served communities to pursue a dream in the entertainment industry.

Since May 2019, DuVernay has co-hosted The Essentials, a weekly film series on Turner Classic Movies, with Ben Mankiewicz. DuVernay has appeared in wrap-arounds each Saturday night on the channel, discussing a wide range of films, including Marty, Ashes and Embers, Harlan County, USA and La Pointe Courte.

At the 2024 Academy Awards ceremony, she wore a red Artists4Ceasefire badge calling for an immediate and permanent ceasefire during the Gaza war. In September 2025, she signed an open pledge with Film Workers for Palestine pledging not to work with Israeli film institutions "that are implicated in genocide and apartheid against the Palestinian people."

In 2025, DuVernay was president of the Jury at the Morelia International Film Festival in Mexico.

Also in 2025, DuVernay participated in the Fall of Freedom, a platform and event for visual artists to criticize cuts to the arts in the second Trump administration.

== Filmography ==
=== Film ===
| Year | Title | Director | Writer | Producer | Ref. |
|---|---|---|---|---|---|
| 2010 | I Will Follow | Yes | Yes | Yes | |
| 2012 | Middle of Nowhere | Yes | Yes | Yes | |
| 2014 | Selma | Yes | No | No | |
| 2018 | A Wrinkle in Time | Yes | No | No | |
| 2023 | Origin | Yes | Yes | Yes | |

Executive producer

- The White Tiger (2021)

Short films

| Year | Title | Director | Writer | Producer | Ref. |
|---|---|---|---|---|---|
| 2006 | Saturday Night Life | Yes | Yes | No | |
| 2013 | The Door | Yes | Yes | Yes | |
| 2013 | Say Yes | Yes | Yes | No | |

=== Documentary films ===
| Year | Title | Director | Writer | Producer | Notes |
|---|---|---|---|---|---|
| 2007 | Compton in C Minor | Yes | No | Yes | Short |
| 2008 | This Is the Life | Yes | Yes | Yes | |
| 2016 | August 28: A Day in the Life of a People | Yes | Yes | Yes | Short |
| 2016 | 13th | Yes | Yes | Yes | |
| 2026 | 14th | Yes | | Yes | |

=== Television ===
| Year | Title | Director | Writer | Executive Producer | Creator | Notes |
|---|---|---|---|---|---|---|
| 2013 | Scandal | Yes | No | No | No | Episode "Vermont is for Lovers, Too" |
| 2015 | For Justice | Yes | No | Yes | No | Unaired TV pilot |
| 2016–2022 | Queen Sugar | Yes | Yes | Yes | Yes | Writer (4 episodes), Director (2 episodes) |
| 2019 | When They See Us | Yes | Yes | Yes | Yes | Director (4 episodes) |
| 2019 | The Red Line | No | No | Yes | No | |
| 2020–2022 | Cherish the Day | No | Yes | Yes | Yes | |
| 2021 | Colin in Black & White | Yes | Yes | Yes | Yes | Episode "Cornrows" |
| 2021 | Home Sweet Home | No | No | Yes | Yes | |
| 2022 | Naomi | No | Yes | Yes | Yes | |
| 2022 | DMZ | Yes | No | Yes | No | Episode "Good Luck" |

Documentary series

| Year | Title | Director | Writer | Producer |
|---|---|---|---|---|
| 2010 | TV One Night Only: Live from the Essence Music Festival | Yes | Yes | No |
| 2010 | My Mic Sounds Nice: A Truth About Women and Hip Hop | Yes | No | executive |
| 2010 | Essence Presents: Faith Through the Storm | Yes | Yes | Yes |
| 2013 | Venus Vs. | Yes | Yes | No |
| 2013 | HelloBeautiful Interludes Live: John Legend | Yes | No | No |

=== Commercials ===
| Year | Title | Notes |
|---|---|---|
| 2015–2016 | Chapter 1, Chapter 2, Chapter 3 | Apple Music |

=== Music video ===
| Year | Title | Director | Writer | Producer | Ref. |
|---|---|---|---|---|---|
| 2017 | "Family Feud," Jay-Z ft. Beyoncé | Yes | Yes | Yes | |

== Awards, nominations, honors ==
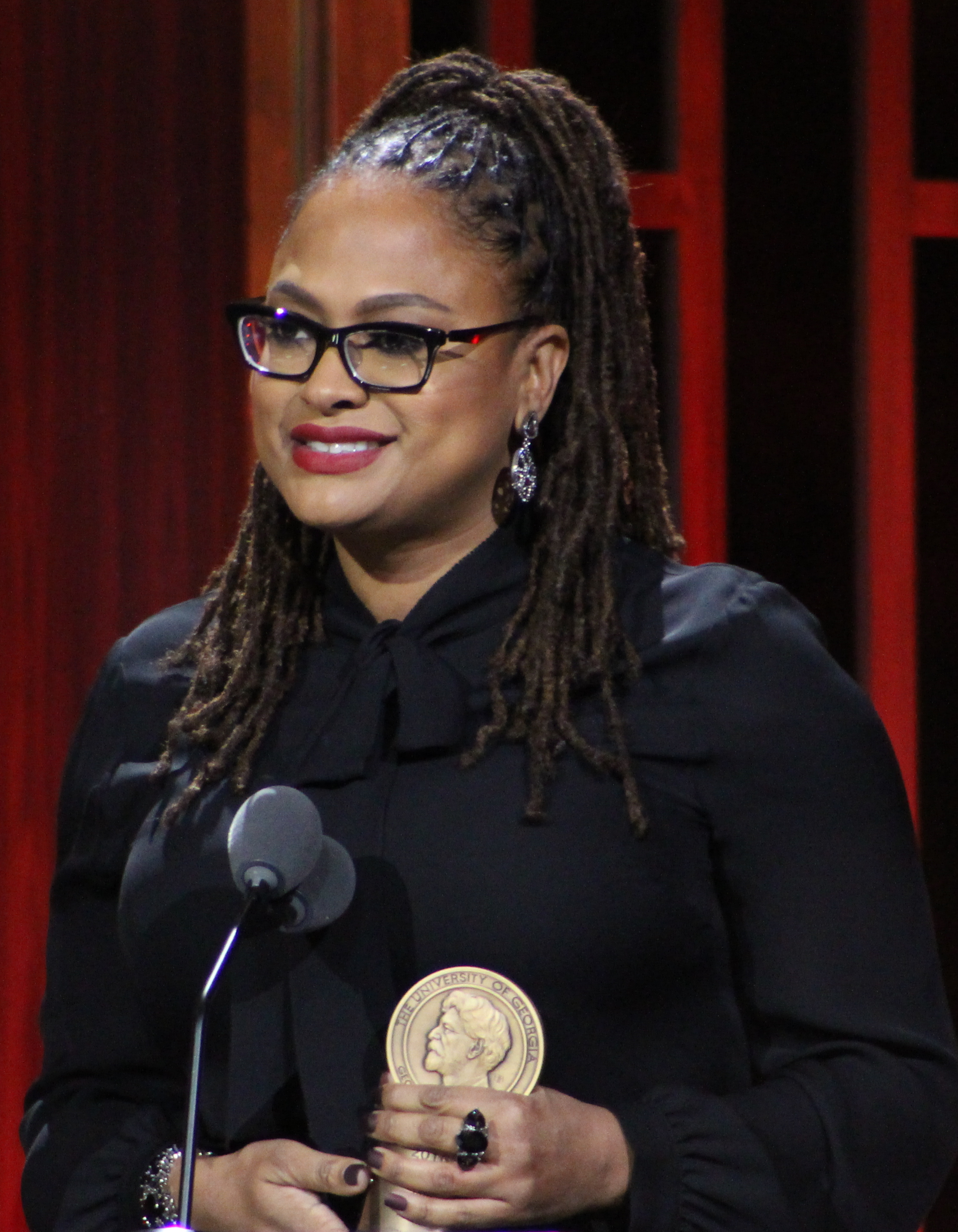
DuVernay with her Peabody Award for 13th at the 76th annual ceremony in 2017

- In 2012, Variety featured DuVernay in its Women's Impact Report.
- In June 2013, she was invited to both the director's and writer's branches of AMPAS. DuVernay was only the second Black woman, following Kasi Lemmons, to be invited to the director's branch.
- DuVernay became the inaugural recipient of the Tribeca Film Institute's Heineken Affinity Award, receiving a $20,000 prize and industry support for future projects. DuVernay donated all the money to AFFRM, the Black arthouse film collective she founded.
- In June 2015, DuVernay was honored as part of Women in Film Crystal + Lucy Awards with the Dorothy Arzner Directors Award.
- In April 2015, DuVernay was chosen as one of Mattel's "Sheros" of 2015. A custom-made one-of-a-kind Barbie in DuVernay's likeness was produced. The doll was auctioned off with the proceeds given to charity. Due to high demand, a collectible version of the doll was produced and sold in December of that year.
- In 2016, DuVernay was named to Oprah Winfrey's SuperSoul 100 list of visionaries and influential leaders
- In 2017, DuVernay became the first Black woman nominated for an Academy Award for Best Documentary Feature, for her film 13th.
- In 2017, DuVernay was the recipient of Smithsonian Magazine's American Ingenuity Award for Visual Arts.
- In 2018, DuVernay won Entertainer of the Year at the 49th NAACP Image Awards for her work in 2017.
- PETA declared DuVernay and actor Benedict Cumberbatch to be the Most Beautiful Vegan Celebs of 2018.
- In 2019, DuVernay's first name was the correct response to a clue in a Sunday New York Times crossword puzzle.
- In 2020, DuVernay was awarded the Dorothy and Lillian Gish Prize.
- In 2021, DuVernay was given the Award for Cinematic Production of the Royal Photographic Society.
- In 2024, the Los Angeles Times featured DuVernay in its "L.A. Influential" series as a "creator who is leaving their mark in Los Angeles".
- In 2024, DuVernay was inducted into the California Hall of Fame.
- In 2025, The U.S. Tennis Association awarded DuVernay its Billie Jean King Champions of Equality Award.
- In 2025, DuVernay was elected to the American Academy of Arts and Sciences.
