= The Passenger (1975 film) =

1975 film by Michelangelo Antonioni

- Italian theatrical release poster
- Italian: Professione: reporter
- Directed by: Michelangelo Antonioni
- Written by: Mark Peploe; Michelangelo Antonioni; Peter Wollen
- Produced by: Carlo Ponti
- Starring: Jack Nicholson; Maria Schneider; Steven Berkoff; Ian Hendry; Jenny Runacre
- Cinematography: Luciano Tovoli
- Edited by: Michelangelo Antonioni; Franco Arcalli
- Music by: Ivan Vandor
- Production companies: Metro-Goldwyn-Mayer; Compagnia Cinematografica Champion; CIPI Cinematografica; Les Films Concordia
- Distributed by: Cinema International Corporation
- Release dates: 28 February 1975 (Italy); 9 April 1975 (U.S.); 18 June 1975 (France); 20 May 1976 (Spain)
- Running time: 126 minutes
- Countries: Italy; United States; Spain; France
- Languages: English; German; Spanish; French
- Box office: $768,744 (2005 re-release)

The Passenger (Italian: Professione: reporter) is a 1975 thriller film directed by Michelangelo Antonioni. Written by Antonioni, Mark Peploe, and Peter Wollen, the film is about a disillusioned Anglo-American journalist, David Locke (Jack Nicholson), who assumes the identity of a dead businessman while working on a documentary in Chad, unaware that he is impersonating an arms dealer with connections to the rebels in the civil war. Along the way, he is accompanied by an unnamed young woman (Maria Schneider).

The Passenger was the final film in Antonioni's three-picture deal with producer Carlo Ponti and Metro-Goldwyn-Mayer, after Blowup (1966) and Zabriskie Point (1970). The film received strong reviews, with critics praising Antonioni's direction, Nicholson's performance, the cinematography, and its themes of identity, disillusionment and existentialism. During the film's release, it was in competition for the Palme d'Or at the Cannes Film Festival.

The film was released by MGM through United Artists in the United States, but in partial settlement of a dispute over a different project, Nicholson received the film rights and reportedly kept it out of video distribution until Sony Pictures offered to remaster and re-release it. In 2005, with Nicholson's consent, Sony Pictures Classics remastered the film, giving it a limited theatrical re-release on 28 October 2005, and releasing it on DVD on 25 April 2006.

== Plot ==
David Locke is a disaffected television journalist in northern Chad, looking to interview rebel fighters who are involved in the civil war. Struggling to find interviewees, he is further frustrated when his Land Rover gets stuck in a sand dune after being abandoned there by guides. After a long walk through the Sahara Desert back to his hotel, an exhausted Locke discovers that a fellow guest (Robertson), an Englishman with whom he had struck up a casual friendship, died in his room of a heart attack that same night. Locke decides to switch identities with Robertson, whom he greatly resembled, and reports his own death at the front desk, the plan going off without a hitch. Locke collects Robertson's belongings, which include a pistol, an appointment book and passport. He alters the passport to carry his own photo.

In London, Locke's unfaithful wife Rachel becomes guilt-ridden when she learns of her husband's "death". She approaches his friend, a BBC producer named Knight, to track down Robertson and learn about Locke's purported last days. Locke, having flown to Munich, finds an airport locker which contains a folder with a price-list and several photocopied pages illustrating armaments. Acting on a whim, he follows a white horse and carriage to a wedding in a baroque chapel, where he waits at the back of the congregation. Once the wedding finishes, two men who observed Locke at the airport confront him and ask for "the papers". After Locke hands them the papers from the locker, they give him an envelope of money and tell him that the second half is to be paid in Barcelona. It becomes apparent that Robertson was an arms dealer for the same rebels whom Locke had been trying to contact in Chad.

In Barcelona, Locke spots Knight, who is trying to find Robertson. Locke encounters an architecture student, credited only as 'Girl', while trying to hide in a Gaudi building, the Palau Güell. Later (at La Pedrera, another Gaudi building on Paseo de Gracia), Locke asks the girl to fetch his belongings from the hotel so that he will not be seen there by Knight, who is watching the lobby. Knight overhears her while she collects her baggage, and speaks to her outside. She offers to take him to meet Robertson, suggesting he follow her in a taxi, but she manages to lose him. She and Locke leave Barcelona, becoming lovers while on the run. Flush with cash from the down payment on undelivered arms, Locke is drawn to keep a meeting scheduled in Robertson's diary. His contact does not show up; the men arranging the arms deal are abducted, interrogated, and beaten by hitmen operating for the Chadian government.

In London, Rachel receives Locke's belongings from Africa. Having heard from Knight of his unsuccessful chase in Barcelona, Rachel is shocked as she opens Locke's passport to find Robertson's photo pasted inside. Suspecting the truth, she heads to Spain to find Locke, as the hitmen follow her, thinking they are after Robertson. Rachel gets help from the Spanish police in her pursuit, but Locke and the girl continue to elude them. With their getaway car damaged, Locke sends the girl away, instructing her to meet him three days later in Tangiers. Virtually trapped, Locke checks into a hotel in the Spanish town of Osuna, where he finds that the girl has returned and booked a double room posing as Mrs. Robertson. He again tries to persuade her to leave. She exits the hotel and dawdles around the dusty square outside, wanting to return to him. Soon the hitmen arrive at the hotel, departing just before the police arrive with Rachel. The girl joins the latter group, who find Locke dead in his room. Asked by the police whether they recognize him, Rachel says that she never knew him, but the girl says "Yes".

== Cast ==
- Jack Nicholson as David Locke
- Maria Schneider as Girl
- Jenny Runacre as Rachel Locke
- Ian Hendry as Martin Knight
- Steven Berkoff as Stephen
- Ambroise Bia as Achebe
- José María Caffarel as Hotel Keeper
- James Campbell as the Witch Doctor
- Manfred Spies as German Stranger
- Jean-Baptiste Tiemele as Murderer
- Ángel del Pozo as Police inspector
- Charles Mulvehill as Robertson

== Production ==
=== Development ===
During the 1960s, Michelangelo Antonioni had signed a three-picture deal with producer Carlo Ponti and Metro-Goldwyn-Mayer. His first two films were Blowup (1966) and Zabriskie Point (1970). His third project was tentatively titled Technically Sweet, which was inspired by the 1958 short story titled "L'avventura di un fotografo" (translated to "The Adventure of a Photographer") by Italo Calvino. The title had been inspired by J. Robert Oppenheimer's remark on the atomic bomb because of the "technically sweet" (mathematical beauty, mathematical elegance) theoretical problems it created. Antonioni first wrote a film treatment in 1966, and later wrote a script in collaboration with Mark Peploe, Niccolò Tucci, and Tonino Guerra. After Zabriskie Point (1970) was released, Antonioni spent two years on pre-production work, including location scouting near the Amazon River.

Jack Nicholson and Maria Schneider had been attached to star in the project. Antonioni had known Nicholson years earlier because Zabriskie Point (1970) and Easy Rider (1969) happened to be filming near each other. Nicholson's co-star Dennis Hopper invited Antonioni to the film's first private screening, after which Antonioni and Nicholson talked at length. However, Ponti grew concerned about the enormous cost of location shooting and cancelled the project. In May 1975, Antonioni told the Los Angeles Times that the commercial failure of Zabriskie Point (1970) had factored into the project's cancellation. The script, translated to its Italian title Tecnicamente dolce, was published by Einaudi in 1976.

A low-budget film titled Fatal Exit was in development for Carlo Ponti Productions. The project had been written by Mark Peploe, who was the brother of Antonioni's then-partner Clare Peploe. Initially, Mark Peploe was to direct the film, with a screenplay written by him and Peter Wollen. However, Ponti instead asked Antonioni to direct the film, mainly because of Peploe's inexperience as a director. Antonioni accepted the offer with Peploe's approval. Antonioni had noticed similarities between Technically Sweet and Peploe's script because it had centered around a photojournalist. However, because of Nicholson's commitment to Chinatown (1974), Antonioni had only six weeks to rewrite the script.

=== Filming ===
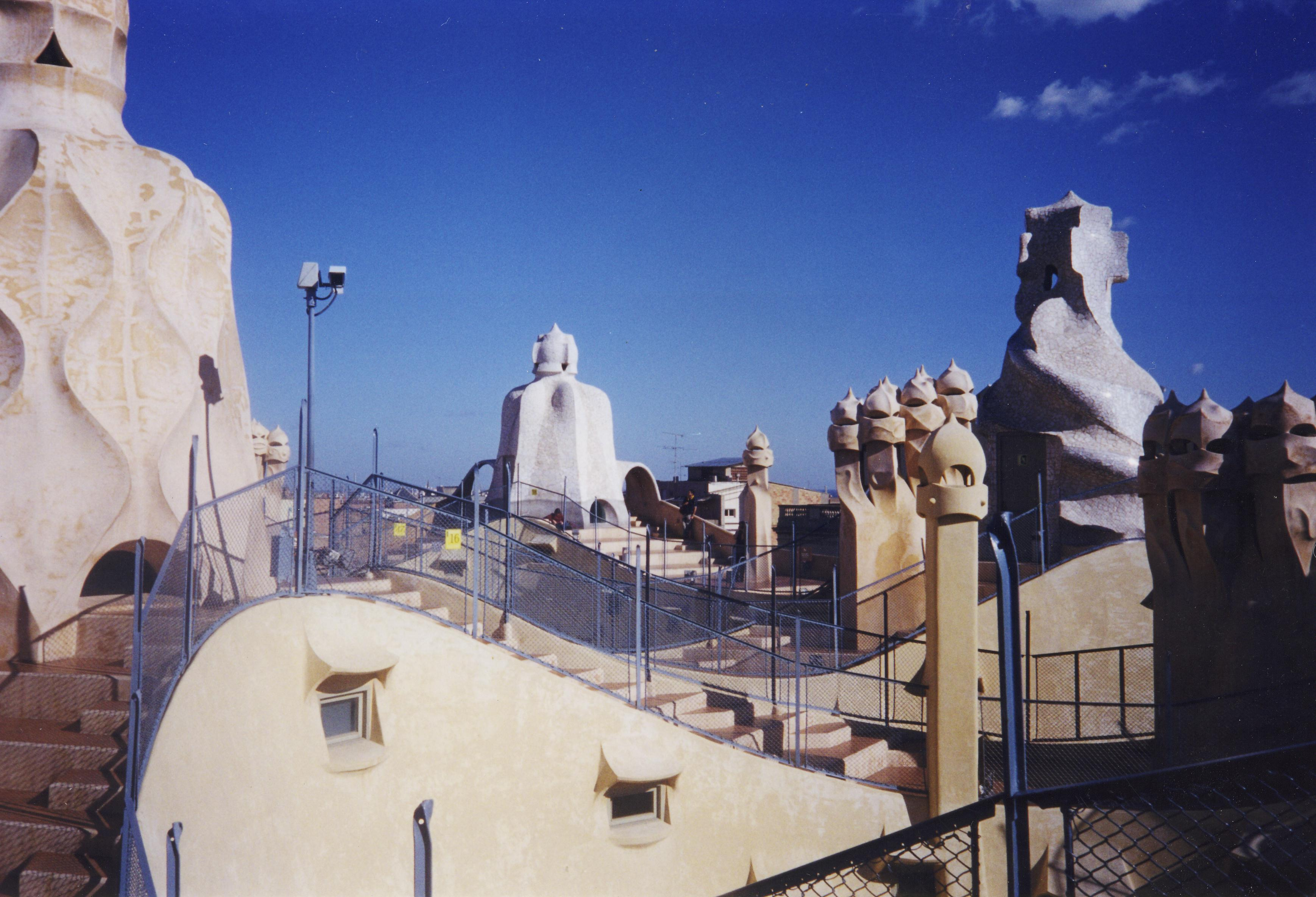
Roof of La Pedrera in Barcelona, as seen in 2005. The look of the roof was quite different in 1975, during filming of The Passenger. Locke (Nicholson) asks the Girl to get his things from the hotel so as not to be seen by Knight, his friend from the BBC.

Principal photography took place in Tassili N'Ajjer, the Illizi Province of Algeria (to depict Chad), Brunswick Centre, London, St. Georg (Bogenhausen), Munich, Las Ramblas, Barcelona and locations across south-eastern Spain (Almería, Madrid, Seville, Malaga Sorbas) throughout mid-to-late 1973.

In a long take, early in the film, Nicholson's character Locke is switching photos, between Locke's and Robertson's passports, in his hotel room, with a tape recording playing an earlier conversation between Locke and Robertson, now dead. The camera pans for 25 seconds, without a cut, to hold on Robertson's now live appearance on the balcony, when Locke appears beside him and the two of them continue talking (i.e. an in-camera in-single-shot flashback).

The execution of a prisoner in this film is not staged. It consists of actual footage of a real execution that the crew filmed while on location.

The film's penultimate shot is a six-minute, 32-second long take tracking shot which begins in Locke's hotel room, looking out onto a dusty square, pushes out through the bars of the hotel window into the square, rotates 180 degrees, and finally tracks back to a close exterior view of the room's interior.

- The location of the hotel is stated to be Osuna in the film. However, the bullring at the edge of the square is recognizably that of the one in the Spanish town of Vera, in the province of Almería. In a DVD commentary, decades later, Nicholson said Antonioni built the entire hotel to get this shot.
- The shot was continuous, preventing adjustment of the lens aperture as the camera left the room and entered the square. Therefore, the footage had to be captured in the late afternoon near dusk to minimize lighting contrast between the brightness outside and inside the room.
- The camera ran on a ceiling track in the hotel room and when it came outside the window, was meant to be picked up by a hook suspended from a giant crane nearly 30 meters high. A system of gyroscopes was fitted on the camera to steady it during the switch from this smooth indoor track to the crane outside. Meanwhile, the bars on the window had been given hinges. When the camera reached the window and the bars were no longer in the field of view, they were swung away to either side. At this time, the camera's forward movement had to stop for a few seconds as the crane's hook grabbed it and took over from the track. To hide this, the lens was slowly and smoothly zoomed until the crane could pull the camera forward. Then the cameraman walked the camera in a circle around the square, giving the crew time to shut the window bars before the camera returned to look through the window from the outside this time. Antonioni directed the scene from a van by means of monitors and microphones, talking to assistants who communicated his instructions to the actors and operators.

Although this is often referred to as the "final shot" of the film, it is not; the last passage shows a small driving school car pulling away in the twilight, and the camera holds on the hotel as the film's credits begin to roll.

== Release ==
The Passenger was released by Metro-Goldwyn-Mayer through United Artists in the United States on 9 April 1975. Years after the film's release, Nicholson had developed and planned to star in a film project, but MGM abandoned the project. Nicholson demanded compensation, to which MGM relinquished The Passenger to Nicholson's ownership. For nearly three decades, Nicholson kept the film from circulation, although it was briefly released by Warner Home Video on videocassette during the 1980s. In 2003, Sony Pictures Classics approached Nicholson with an offer to restore and re-release the film. On 28 October 2005, the film was given a limited release in the United States, in which it earned $768,744 worldwide. The film was released on DVD on 25 April 2006.

== Reception ==
Vincent Canby of The New York Times wrote the film was "a suspense melodrama, a story so basically conventional that it isn't until you're at least half‐way through it you realize it's a magnificent nightmare, and that you are on the inside looking out." Gene Siskel of the Chicago Tribune gave the film a complete four-star review, stating "The Passenger is a complex film that is obvious only in its physical beauty. And if you don't hook into that cerebral adventure story, you'll probably find the pace of the chase story to be much too slow. Viewers who connect to that other layer, however, will find a remarkable richness of image and idea ... Nicholson turns in another superior performance, managing to communicate his own brand of wise anger without puncturing Antonioni's grand design." Jay Cocks, reviewing for Time magazine, praised the film's cinematography, writing the film "has some of the boldest and most supple imagery that Antonioni has achieved in years—more memorable than anything in Blow-Up or the unfortunate Zabriskie Point ... The Passenger ends with a scene that seems destined for cinematic history."

Kevin Thomas of the Los Angeles Times called the film "a masterpiece of visual beauty and rigorous artistry that is as tantalizing as it is hypnotic. It is a major achievement by one of the world's great film-makers and boasts still another of those splendid portrayals from Nicholson". Penelope Gilliatt of The New Yorker called the film a "triumph of technical invention that stretches the wizardly vocabulary of film as he has never stretched it before". Hank Werba of Variety wrote Antonioni "laboriously hand-fashioned an excellent film spectacle that is so marked by his own style and anguish reflections on contemporary life as to encourage further collaborative encounters."

Roger Ebert initially gave the film a negative review in 1975. In 2005, he revisited the film with a more positive review, writing that it was a perceptive look at identity, alienation and the human desire to escape oneself. He also praised Schneider's performance as "a performance of breathtaking spontaneity." John Simon, in his 1983 book Something to Declare, wrote disapprovingly that "Emptiness is everywhere: in landscapes and townscapes, churches and hotel rooms, and most of all in the script. Never was dialogue more pretentiously vacuous, plot more rudimentary yet preposterous, action more haphazard and spasmodic, characterization more tenuous and uninvolving, filmmaking more devoid of all but postures and pretensions".

In 2012, The Passenger was ranked 110th on the Sight & Sound critics' poll. The film was included by Empire magazine as one of its "500 Greatest Movies of All Time." The magazine praised the film's camerawork (by Luciano Tovoli) and the performances, particularly Nicholson's quiet and reflective performance. On the review aggregator website Rotten Tomatoes, 88% of 77 critics' reviews are positive, with an average rating of 8.1/10. The website's consensus reads: "Antonioni's classic, a tale of lonely, estranged characters on a journey through the mysterious landscapes of identity, shimmers with beauty and uncertainty." On Metacritic, the film has a score of 90 based on 20 reviews, indicating "universal acclaim".

== See also ==
- Michelangelo Antonioni filmography
