= Rough Magic =

- Directed by: Clare Peploe
- Screenplay by: Robert Mundi; William Brookfield; Clare Peploe
- Based on: Miss Shumway Waves a Wand by James Hadley Chase
- Starring: Bridget Fonda; Russell Crowe; Jim Broadbent; D. W. Moffett; Paul Rodriguez
- Cinematography: John J. Campbell
- Edited by: Suzanne Hartley
- Music by: Richard Hartley
- Production company: Recorded Picture Company
- Distributed by: Goldwyn Entertainment Company
- Release date: May 30, 1995
- Running time: 104 minutes
- Country: United States
- Language: English
- Box office: $598,981

Rough Magic is a 1995 comedy film directed by Clare Peploe, starring Bridget Fonda and Russell Crowe. The screenplay was written by Robert Mundi, William Brookfield, and Clare Peploe. Rough Magic is based on the 1944 novel Miss Shumway Waves a Wand by British novelist James Hadley Chase, which had previously been adapted as the 1962 French-Argentine film Une blonde comme ça.

== Cast ==
- Bridget Fonda as Myra Shumway
- Russell Crowe as Alex Ross
- Jim Broadbent as Doc Ansell
- Kenneth Mars as Magician
- D. W. Moffett as Cliff Wyatt
- Paul Rodriguez as Diego

== Production ==
Filming locations in Michoacán, Mexico; Tikal, Guatemala; and Los Angeles, United States.

== Release ==
The film was released in France on August 30, 1995 and in the United States on May 30, 1997.

== Reception ==
On the review aggregator website Rotten Tomatoes, 25% of 8 critics' reviews are positive, with an average rating of 4.6/10.

Film critic Roger Ebert gave the film 2 stars, writing:

Peploe, who is married to Bernardo Bertolucci, co-wrote his Luna (1979) and Antonioni's Zabriskie Point (1970), and has directed one previous feature, High Season (1987), an engagingly goofy comedy set on a Greek island and involving tourists and spies. Nothing she has done before is anything like Rough Magic, which seems to be a visitor from a parallel timeline: If film noir had developed in South America instead of California, maybe we would have seen more films like this.

Apart from anything else, the movie is wonderful to look at. It's a cliche to talk about great visuals, since if you point a camera in the right direction you can make almost anything look good. But John J. Campbell and Peploe create painterly compositions with rich Mexican colors, and there are landscape shots and atmospheric effects here that are astonishing.
