= Mark Peploe =

English screenwriter and film director (1943–2025)

- Born: Mark Alexis More Peploe; 24 February 1943; Nairobi, Colony and Protectorate of Kenya
- Died: 18 June 2025 (aged 82); Florence, Italy
- Occupations: Film director; screenwriter
- Years active: 1972–1996
- Relatives: Clare Peploe (sister); Bernardo Bertolucci (brother-in-law)

Mark Peploe (24 February 1943 – 18 June 2025) was an English screenwriter and film director. He was the brother of Clare Peploe, and the brother-in-law of director Bernardo Bertolucci.

== Early life and career ==
Mark Peploe was born in Nairobi on 24 February 1943. His paternal grandfather was the renowned Scottish painter Samuel John Peploe (S. J. Peploe), and his maternal great-great-grandfather was the German sculptor Adolf von Hildebrand. His mother, Clotilde Peploe, was a noted painter, and his father, Willy Peploe, worked as an art dealer. He had a sister, Clare Peploe, also a screenwriter.

He started making documentaries, but turned to writing scripts. He wrote the screenplay for the 1975 film The Passenger. He went on to write High Season (1987) with his sister Clare, as well as The Last Emperor (1987) with Bernardo Bertolucci. He won an Academy Award in the best adapted screenplay category for the latter. Peploe also helped write The Sheltering Sky (1990) and Little Buddha (1993), both directed by Bertolucci.

== Personal life and death ==
Peploe's partner was art historian Alina Payne. Prior to that, he was married to costume designer Louise Stjernsward, with whom he had a daughter, Lola.

Peploe died in Florence, Italy on 18 June 2025, at the age of 82.

== Filmography ==
=== As Screenwriter ===
Year	Title	Director	Notes
1972	The Pied Piper	Jacques Demy	Writing Credit with Andrew Birkin and Jacques Demy
1975	The Passenger	Michelangelo Antonioni	Writing Credit with Michelangelo Antonioni and Peter Wollen
1975	Wanted: Babysitter	René Clément	Writing Credit with Nicola Badalucco, René Clément and Luciano Vincenzoni
1985	Samson and Delilah	Self	Short Film; Writing Credit with Frederick Seidel; Nominated - BAFTA Award for Best Short Film
1987	High Season	Clare Peploe	Writing Credit with Clare Peploe
1987	The Last Emperor	Bernardo Bertolucci	Writing Credit with Bernardo Bertolucci; Academy Award for Best Adapted Screenplay; Golden Globe Award for Best Screenplay; David di Donatello for Best Script; Nominated - Writers Guild of America Award for Best Original Screenplay
1990	The Sheltering Sky	Bernardo Bertolucci	Writing Credit with Bernardo Bertolucci
1991	Afraid of the Dark	Self	Writing Credit with Frederick Seidel
1993	Little Buddha	Bernardo Bertolucci	Writing Credit with Rudy Wurlitzer
1996	Victory	Self	Writing Credit with Frederick Seidel
