= La Pedrera, Barcelona =

Building in Barcelona, Spain

Coordinates: 41°23′43″N 2°09′42″E

Casa Milà
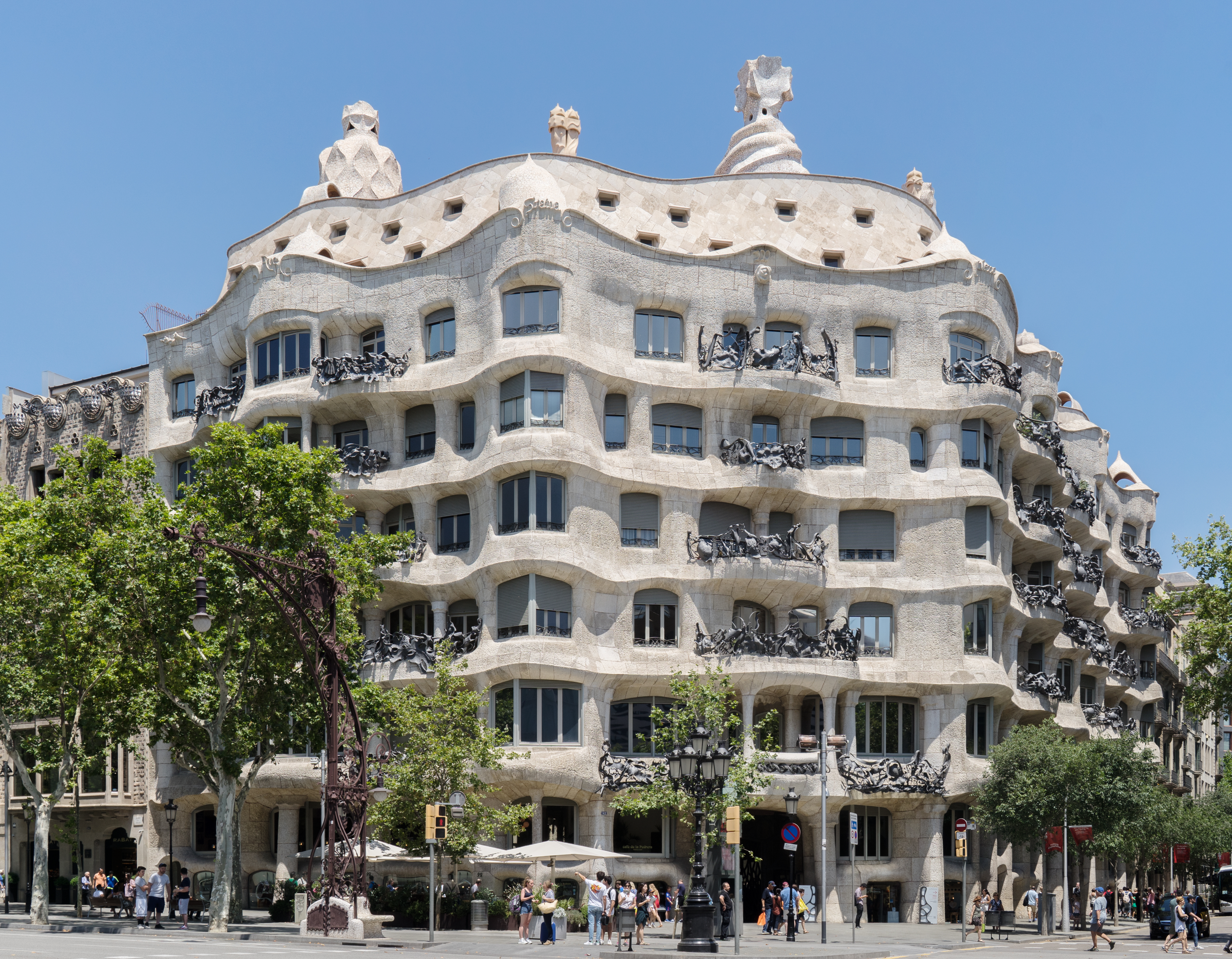
- Alternative names: La Pedrera

General information
- Architectural style: Modernisme
- Location: 92, Passeig de Gràcia, Barcelona, Catalonia, Spain
- Owner: Fundació Catalunya-La Pedrera

Design and construction
- Architect: Antoni Gaudí

UNESCO World Heritage Site
- Part of: Works of Antoni Gaudí
- Criteria: Cultural: (i), (ii), (iv)
- Reference: 320-003
- Inscription: 1984 (8th Session)
- Extensions: 2005

Spanish Cultural Heritage
- Type: Non-movable
- Criteria: Monument
- Designated: 24 July 1969
- Reference no.: RI-51-0003814

Casa Milà (Catalan: [ˈkazə miˈla], Spanish: [ˈkasa miˈla]), popularly known as La Pedrera (Catalan: [lə pəˈðɾeɾə], Spanish: [la peˈðɾeɾa]; "the stone quarry") in reference to its unconventional rough-hewn appearance, is a Modernista building in Barcelona, Catalonia, Spain. It was the last private residence designed by architect Antoni Gaudí and was built between 1906 and 1912.

The building was commissioned in 1906 by Pere Milà and his wife Roser Segimon. At the time, it was controversial because of its undulating stone facade, twisting wrought iron balconies, and design by Josep Maria Jujol. Several structural innovations include a self-supporting stone façade, and a free-plan floor, underground garage and the spectacular terrace on the roof.

In 1984, it was declared a World Heritage Site by UNESCO. Since 2013 it has been the headquarters of the Fundació Catalunya La Pedrera, which manages visits to the building, exhibitions and other cultural and educational activities at Casa Milà.

== Building history ==
=== Architect ===
Antoni Gaudí i Cornet was born on June 25, 1852, in Catalonia, Spain. As a child, Gaudí's health was poor, suffering from rheumatism. Because of this, he was afforded lengthy periods of time resting at his summer house in Riudoms. Here he spent a large portion of his time outdoors, allowing him to deeply study nature. This would become one of the major influences in his architecture to come.

Today he is regarded as a pioneer of the modern architecture style.

In 1870, Gaudí moved to Barcelona to study architecture. He was an inconsistent student who showed flashes of brilliance. It took him eight years to graduate due to a mix of health complications, military service as well as other activities.

After completion of his education he became a prolific architect as well as designing gardens, sculptures and all other decorative arts. Gaudí's most famous works consisted of several buildings: Parque Güell; Palacio Güell; Casa Mila; Casa Vicens. He also is attributed for his work on the Crypt of La Sagrada Familia and the Nativity facade. Gaudí's work at the time was both admired and criticized for his bold, innovative solutions.

Gaudí was injured on June 7, 1926, when he was run over by a tram. He later died in the hospital due to his injuries on June 10, 1926, at the age of 73. A few years after his death, his fame became renowned by critics and the general public alike.

=== Building owners ===
The owners of Casa Milà in 1910
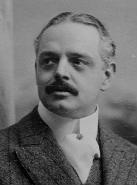
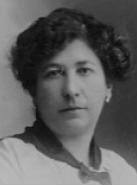

Casa Milà was built for Roser Segimón and her husband Pere Milà. Roser Segimón was the wealthy widow of Josep Guardiola, an Indiano or Americano, or former colonist returned from the Americas, who had made his fortune with a coffee plantation in Guatemala. Her second husband, Pere Milà, was a developer known for his flamboyant lifestyle.

=== Construction process ===
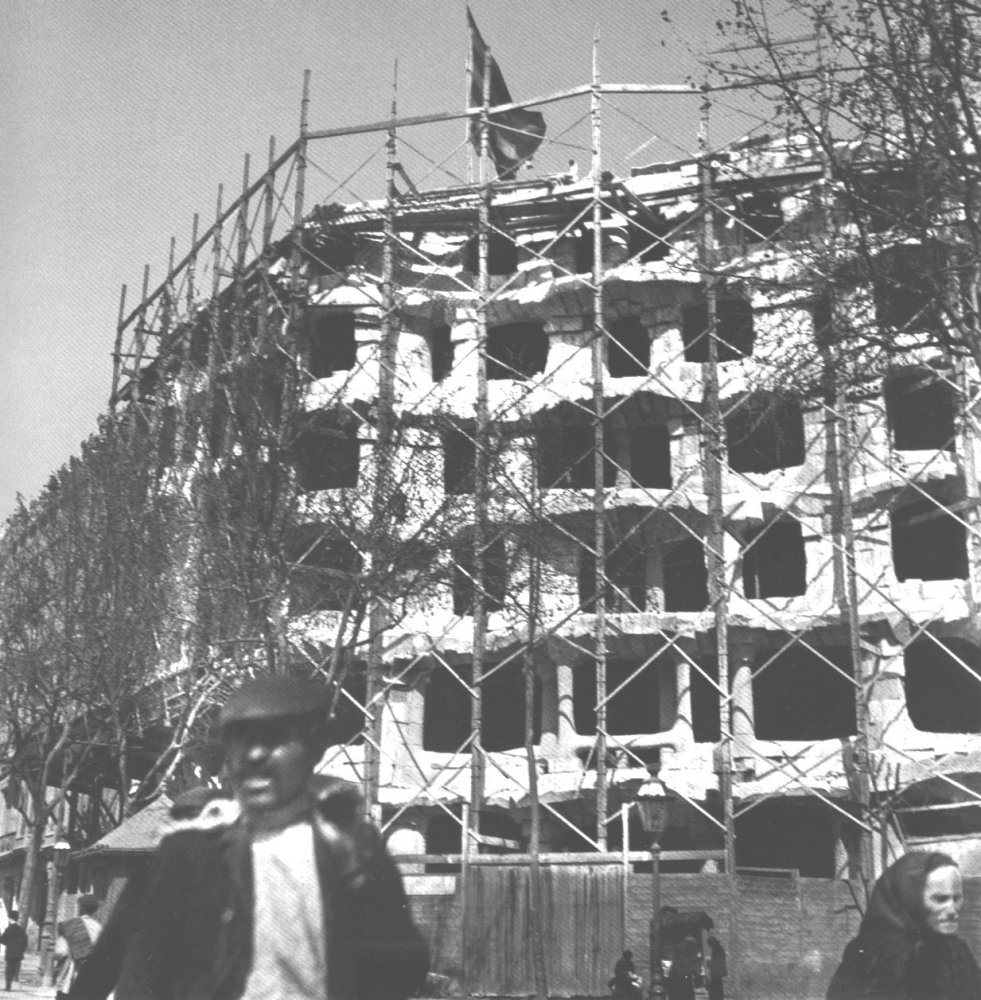
La Casa Milà being built

In 1905, Milà and Segimón married and on June 9, Roser Segimón bought a house with garden which occupied an area of 1,835 square meters, located on Paseo de Gracia, 92. In September, they commissioned Gaudí for building them a new house with the idea of living in the main floor and renting out the rest of the apartments. On February 2, 1906, the project was presented to the Barcelona City Council and the works began, demolishing the pre-existing building instead of reforming it, as in the case of the Casa Batlló.

The building was completed in December 1910 and the owner asked Gaudí to make a certificate to inhabit the main floor, which the City Council authorized in October 1911, and the couple moved in. On October 31, 1912, Gaudí issued the certificate stating that, in accordance with his plans and his direction, the work had been completed and the whole house was ready to be rented.

=== Critics and controversies ===
The building did not respect any rules of conventional style, for which Gaudí received much criticism. To begin with, the name "La Pedrera" is in fact a nickname assigned by the citizens who disapproved of its unusualness. The unique structure of the building and the relationship between the building's architect and Pere Milà became the object of ridicule for the people of Barcelona and many humorous publications of the time.

==== Catholic symbols ====
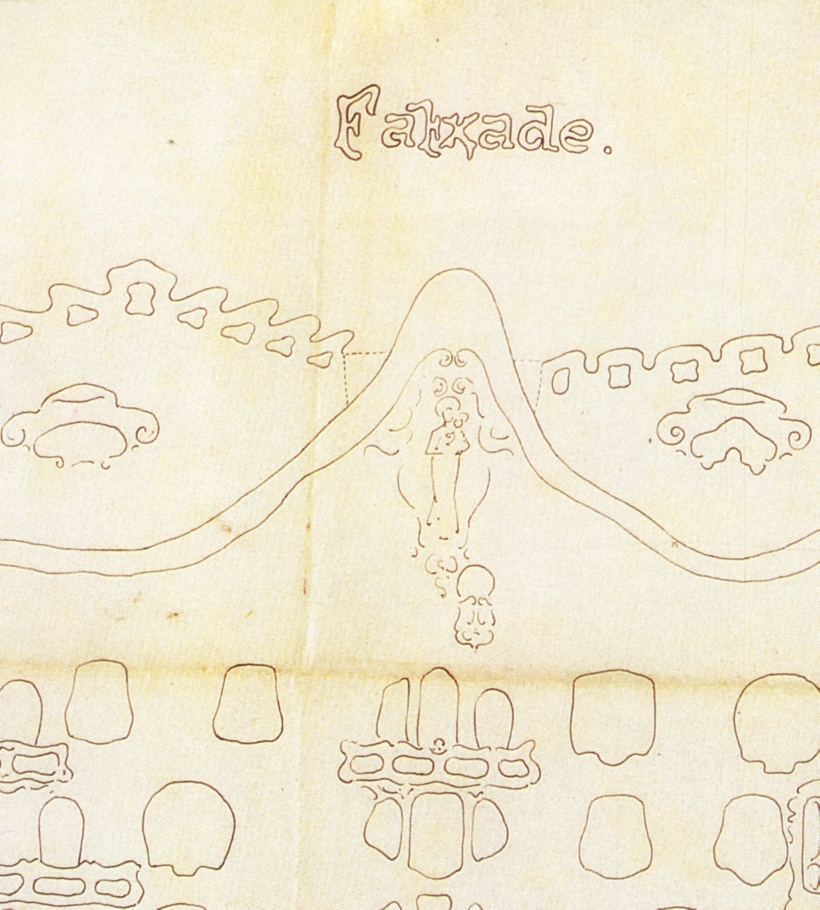
A fragment from first drafts of the architectural plans from 1906, showing the sculptures mounted on the upper facade.

Gaudí, a Catholic and a devotee of the Virgin Mary, planned for the Casa Milà to be a spiritual symbol. Overt religious elements include an excerpt from the Rosary on the cornice and planned statues of Mary, specifically Our Lady of the Rosary, and two archangels, St. Michael and St. Gabriel.

However, the Casa Milà was not built entirely to Gaudí's specifications. The local government ordered the demolition of elements that exceeded the height standard for the city, and fined the Milàs for many infractions of building codes. After Semana Trágica, an outbreak of anticlericalism in the city, Milà prudently decided to forgo the religious statues. Gaudí contemplated abandoning the project but a priest persuaded him to continue.

=== Change of ownership ===
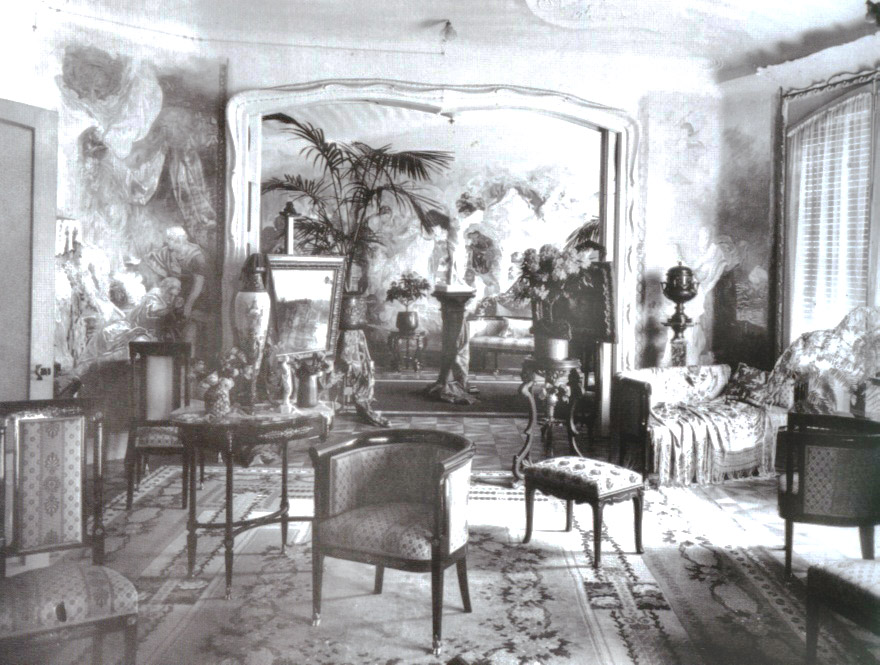
Interior of Casa Milà in 1910

In 1940, Milà died. Segimon sold the property in 1946 for 18 million pesetas to Josep Ballvé i Pellisé, known for his department stores on Ronda de Sant Antoni, in partnership with the family of Pío Rubert Laporta. The Compañía Inmobiliaria Provenza, SA (CIPSA) was founded to administer the building. Roser Segimon continued to live on the main floor until her death in 1964.

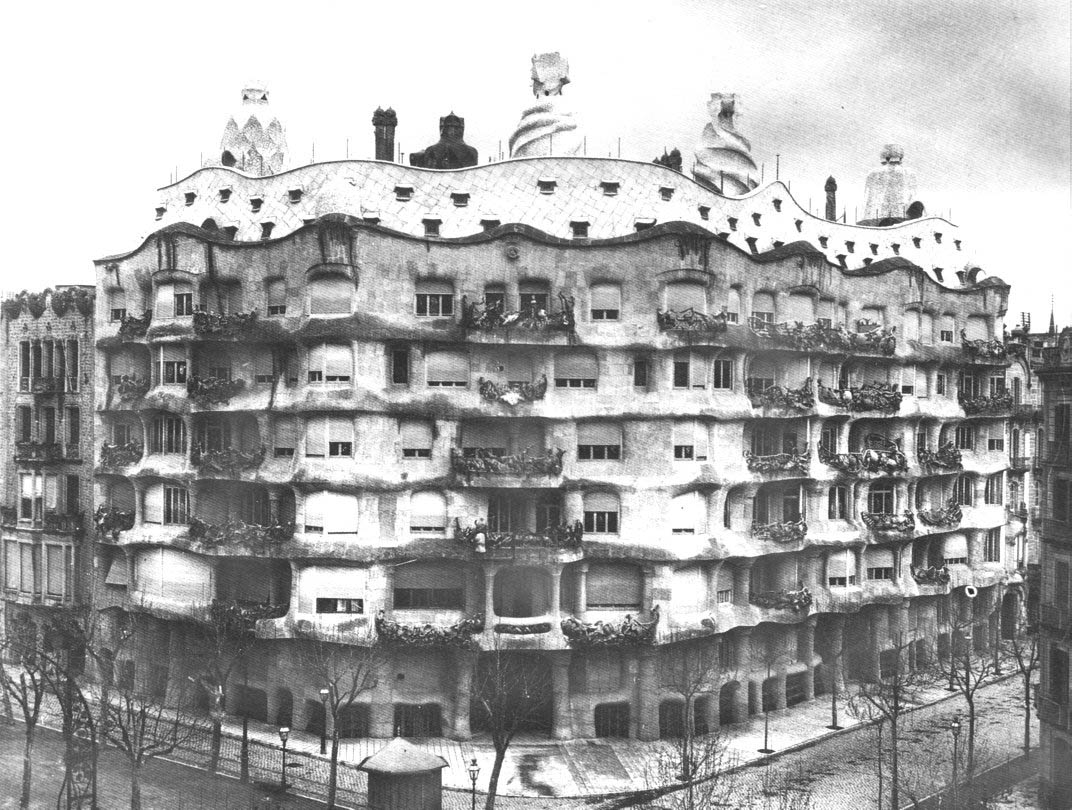
Casa Milà in 1914

The new owners divided the first floor facing Carrer de Provença into five apartments instead of the original two. In 1953, they commissioned Francisco Juan Barba Corsini to convert 13 rubbish-filled attic laundry rooms to street-facing apartments, leaving a communal hallway on the side facing the courtyards. Some of these two or three room apartments had a loft and were designed and furnished in a typical early 1950s style using brick, ceramic and wood. Items of furniture, such as the Pedrera chair, were reminiscent of Eero Saarinen's work.

The insurance company Northern took over the main floor in 1966. By then, Casa Milà had housed a bingo hall, an academy and the offices of Cementos Molins and Inoxcrom among others. Maintenance costs were high and the owners had allowed the building to become dilapidated, causing stones to loosen in 1971. Josep Anton Comas made some emergency repairs, especially to the paintings in the courtyards, while respecting the original design.

The building was later acquired by the Caixa Catalunya bank. When Caixa Catalunya ceased trading independently as a bank in 2010 and merged with two other savings banks, they formed a not-for-profit foundation to operate the building.

=== Restoration ===
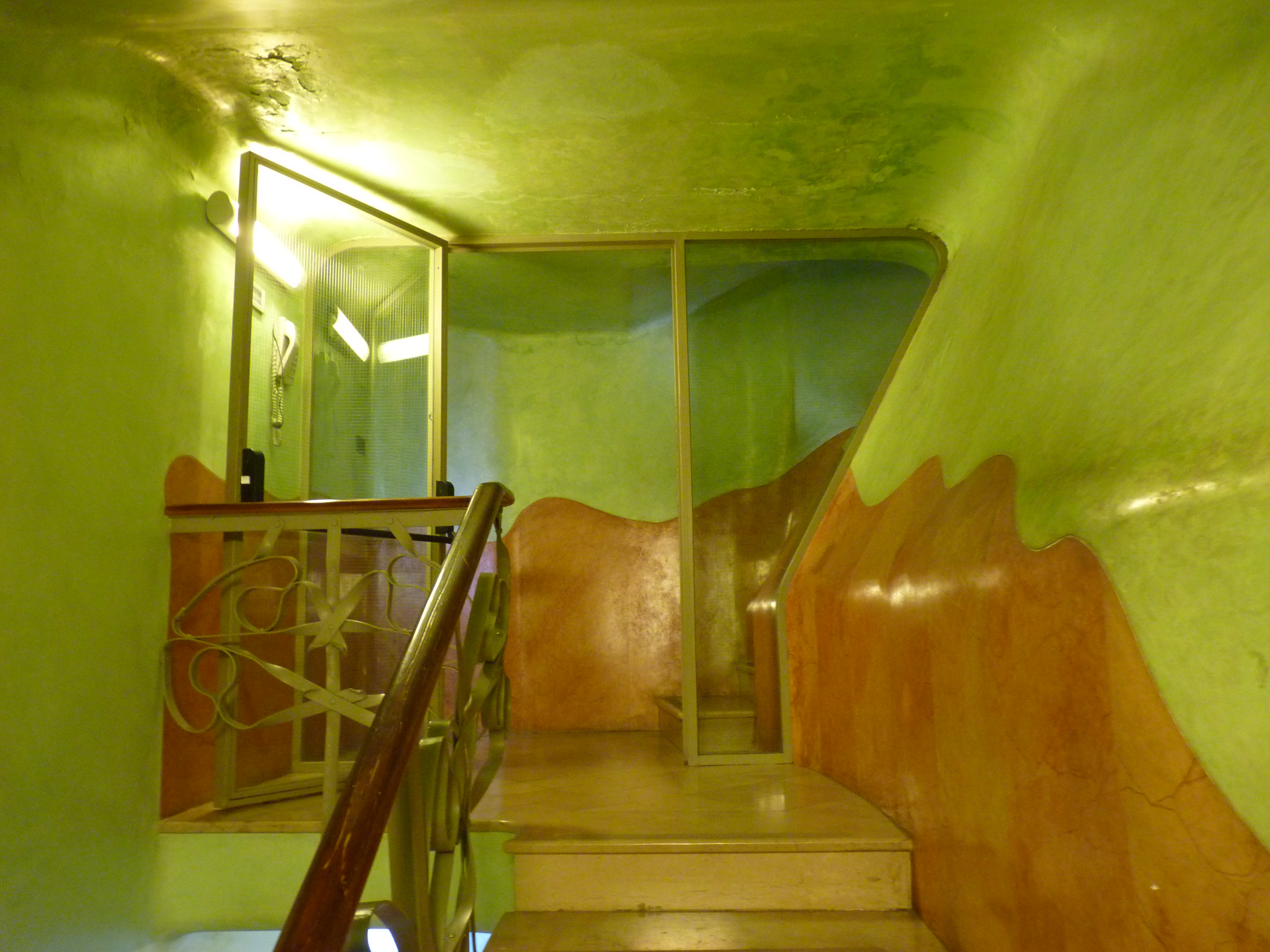
After being re-painted a dreary brown, the building's colors were restored in the 1980s

Gaudí's work was designated a historic and artistic monument in 1969. Casa Milà was in poor condition in the early 1980s. In 1984, the building became part of a World Heritage Site encompassing some of Gaudí's works. In 1986 Caixa Catalunya bought La Pedrera. Restoration and cleaning of the façade began two months later.The renovated main floor opened in 1990 as part of the Cultural Olympiad of Barcelona. The floor became an exhibition room with an example of modernism in the Eixample.

=== Residence ===
Created partly as a tenant’s unit, there were previous tenants including Alberto I. Gache, the consul of the Argentine Republic to Barcelona, Egyptian prince Ibrahim Hassan who even died at his residence in La Pedrera, and motor racing pioneer Paco Abadal, whose family was the first tenants of Casa Milà. As of 2026, the writer Ana Viladomiu is the building's sole remaining resident.

== Design ==
The building is 1,323 m^{2} per floor on a plot of 1,620 m^{2}. Gaudí made the first sketches in his workshop in the Sagrada Família. He designed the house as a constant curve, both outside and inside, incorporating ruled geometry and naturalistic elements.

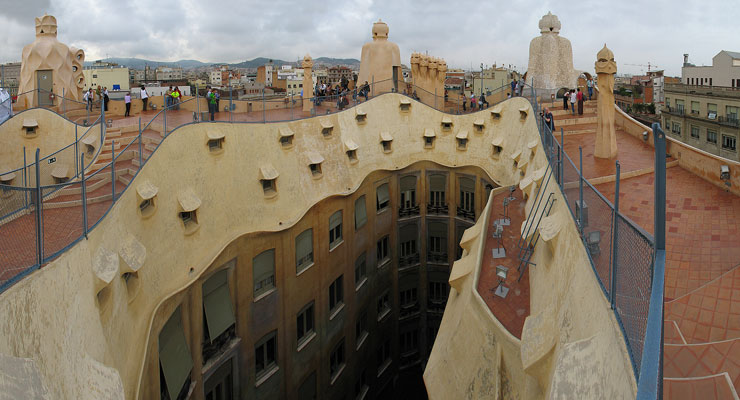
The courtyard

Casa Milà consists of two buildings, which are structured around two courtyards that provide light to the nine stories: basement, ground floor, mezzanine, main (or noble) floor, four upper floors, and an attic. The basement was intended to be the garage, the main floor the residence of the Milàs (a flat of all 1,323 m^{2}), and the rest distributed over 20 apartments. The resulting layout is shaped like an asymmetrical "8" because of the different shapes and sizes of the courtyards. The attic housed the laundry and drying areas, forming an insulating space for the building and simultaneously determining the levels of the roof.

One of the most notable elements of the building is the roof, crowned with skylights, staircase exits, fans, and chimneys. All of these elements, constructed out of brick covered with lime, broken marble, or glass have a specific architectural function but are also real sculptures integrated into the building.

The apartments feature plastered ceilings with dynamic reliefs, handcrafted wooden doors, windows, and furniture, as well as hydraulic tiles and various ornamental elements.

The stairways were intended as service entries, with the main access to the apartments by elevator except for the noble floor, where Gaudí added a prominent interior staircase. Gaudí wanted the people who lived in the flats to all know each other. Therefore, there were only elevators on every other floor, so people on different floors would meet one another.

=== Structure ===
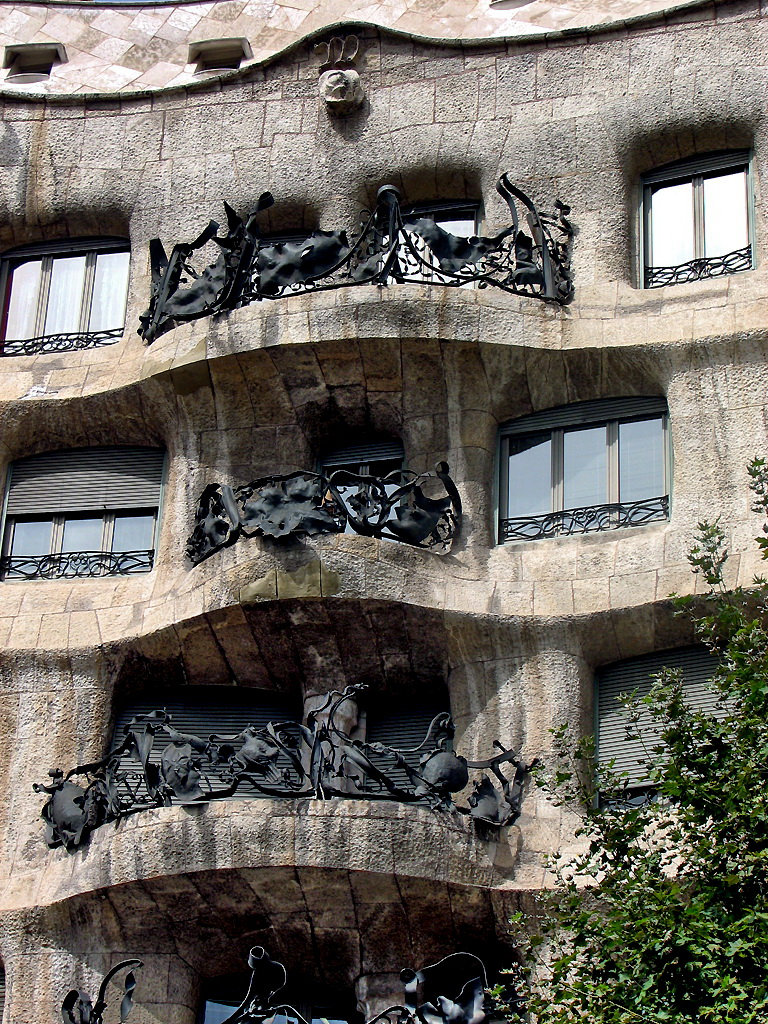
CasaMila-Balcony, showing the self-supporting stone facade, also supported by curved iron beams

Casa Milà is characterized by its self-supporting stone facade, meaning that it is free of load-bearing walls. The facade connects to the internal structure of each floor by means of curved iron beams surrounding the perimeter of each floor. This construction system allows, on one hand, large openings in the facade which give light to the homes, and on the other, free structuring of the different levels, so that internal walls can be added and demolished without affecting the stability of the building. This allows the owners to change their minds at will and to modify, without problems, the interior layout of the homes.

=== Constructive and decorative items ===
==== Facade ====
The facade is composed of large blocks of limestone from the Garraf Massif on the first floor and from the Villefranche quarry for the higher levels. The blocks were cut to follow the plot of the projection of the model, then raised to their location and adjusted to align in a continuous curve to the pieces around them.

The windows of La Pedrera are an integral part of the overall facade design. Gaudí made sure that the windows were of varying sizes, designed to optimize the amount of natural light that could enter the building.

Viewed from the outside the building has three parts: the main body of the six-storey blocks with winding stone floors, two floors set a block back with a different curve, similar to waves, a smoother texture and whiter color, and with small holes that look like embrasures, and finally the body of the roof.

Gaudí's original facade had some of its lower-level ironwork removed. In 1928, the tailor Mosella opened the first store in La Pedrera, and he eliminated the bars. This did not concern anyone, because in the middle of twentieth century, wrought ironwork had little importance. The ironwork was lost until a few years later, when Americans donated one of them to the MoMa, where it is on display.

With restoration initiatives launched in 1987, the facade was rejoined to some pieces of stone that had fallen. In order to respect the fidelity of the original, material was obtained from the Villefranche quarry, even though by then it was no longer operating.

==== Hall and courtyards ====
The building uses a completely original solution to solve the issue of a lobby being too closed and dark. Its open and airy courtyards provide a place of transit and are directly visible to those accessing the building. There are two patios on the side of the Passeig de Gracia and of the street Provence.

Patios

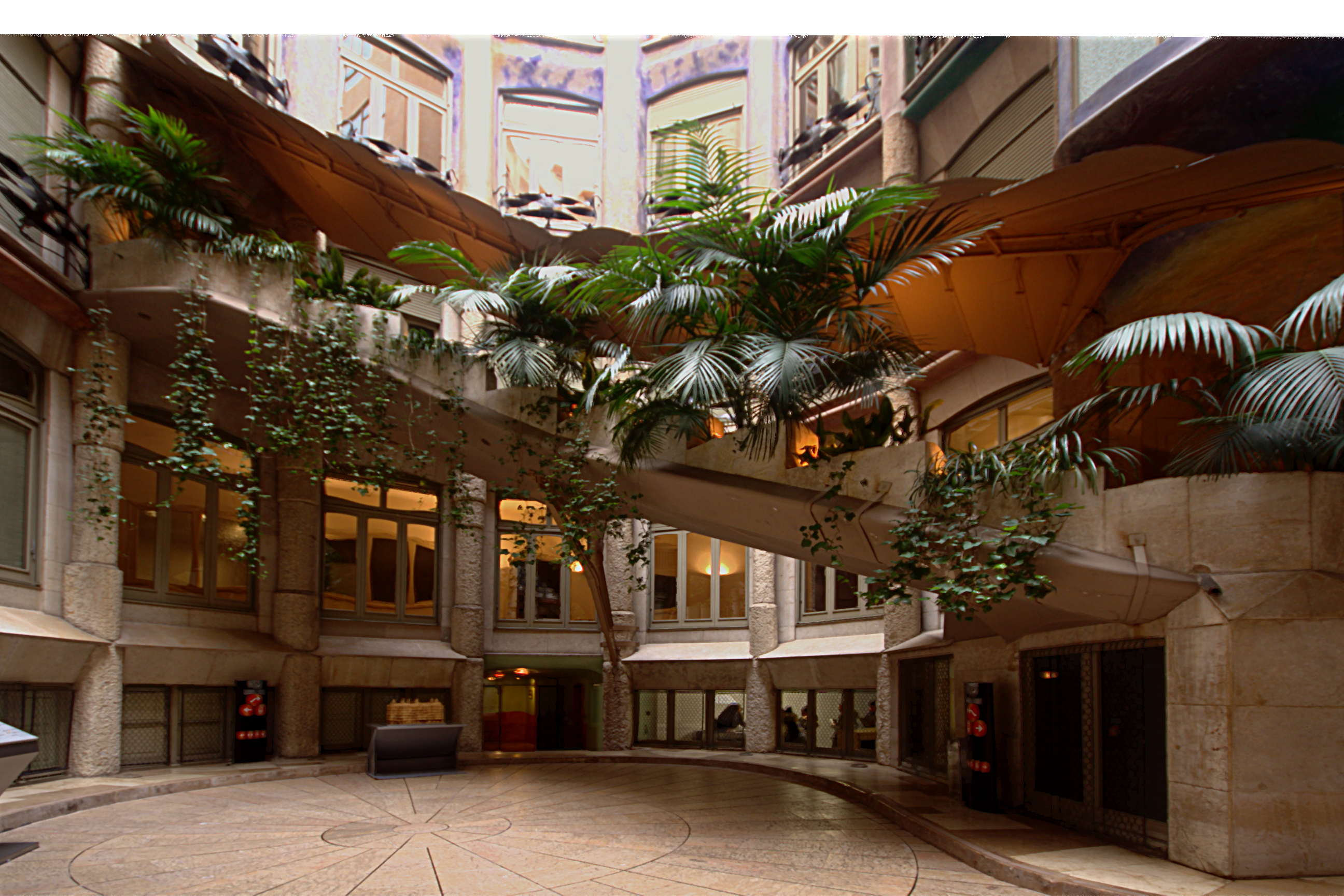
The patio

Patios, structurally, are key as supporting loads of interior facades. The floor of the courtyard is supported by pillars of cast iron. In the courtyard, there are traditional elliptical beams and girders but Gaudí applied an ingenious solution of using two concentric cylindrical beams with stretched radial beams, like the spokes of a bicycle. They form a point outside of the beam to two points above and below, making the function of the central girder a keystone and working in tension and compression simultaneously. This supported structure is twelve feet in diameter and is considered "the soul of the building" with a clear resemblance to Gothic crypts. The centerpiece was built in a shipyard by Josep Maria Carandell who copied a steering wheel, interpreting Gaudí's intent as to represent the helm of the ship of life.

Interior, gates

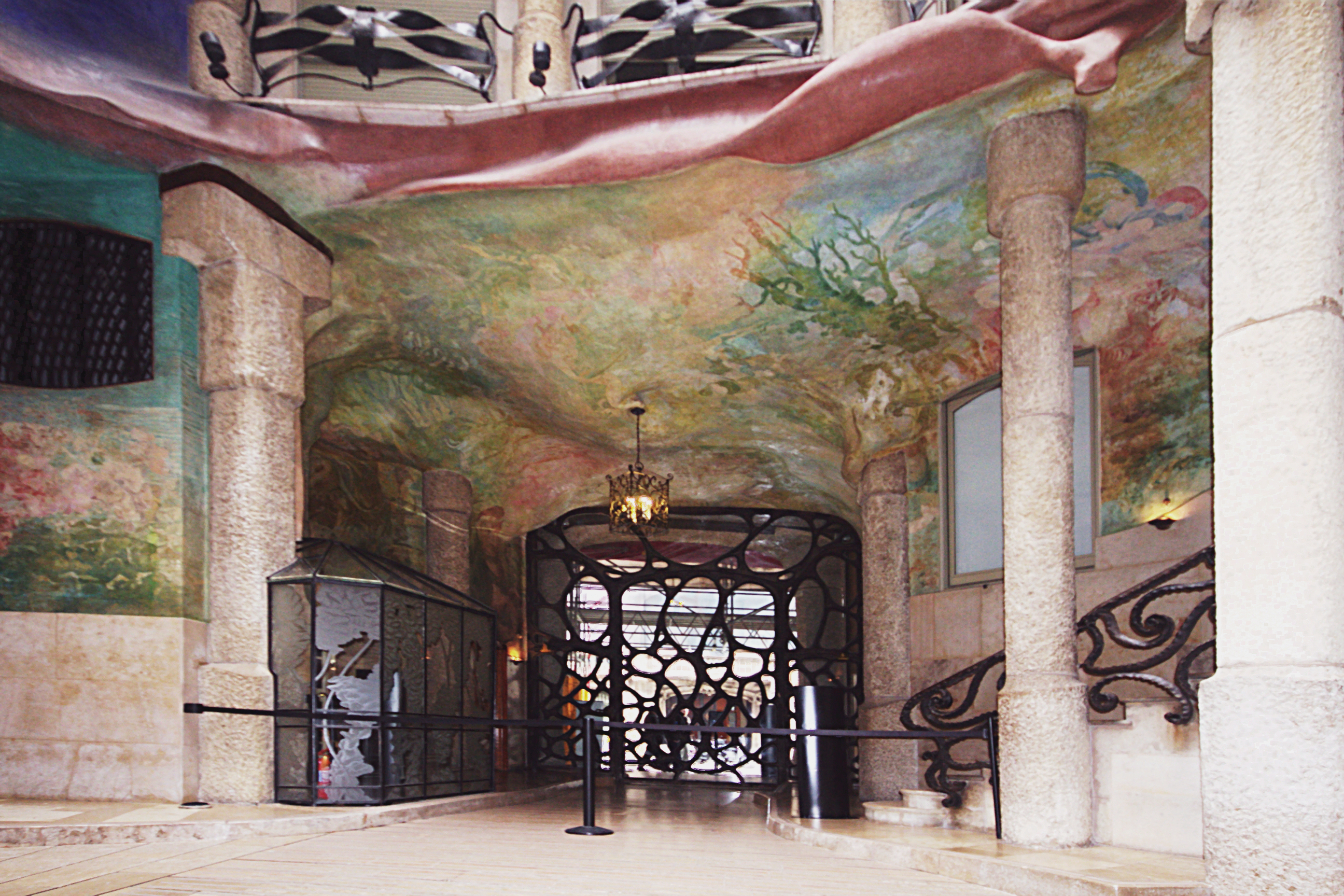
Paintings cover the walls, with access protected by a giant iron gate

Access is protected by a massive iron gate with a design attributed to Jujol. It was originally used by both people and cars, as access to the garage is in the basement, now an auditorium.

The two halls are fully polychrome with oil paintings on the plaster surfaces, with eclectic references to mythology and flowers.

During construction there was a problem including a basement as a garage for cars, the new invention that was thrilling the bourgeois at the time. The future neighbor Felix Anthony Meadows, owner of Industrial Linera, requested a change because his Rolls-Royce could not access it. Gaudí agreed to remove a pillar on the ramp that led into the garage so that Felix, who was establishing sales and factory in Parets del Vallès, could go to both places with his car from La Pedrera.

For the floors of Casa Milà, Gaudí used a model of floor forms of square timbers with two colors, and the hydraulic pavement hexagonal pieces of blue and sea motifs that had originally been designed for the Batllo house. The wax was designed in gray by John Bertrand under the supervision of Gaudí who "touched up with their own fingers," in the words of the manufacturer Josep Bay.

==== Loft ====
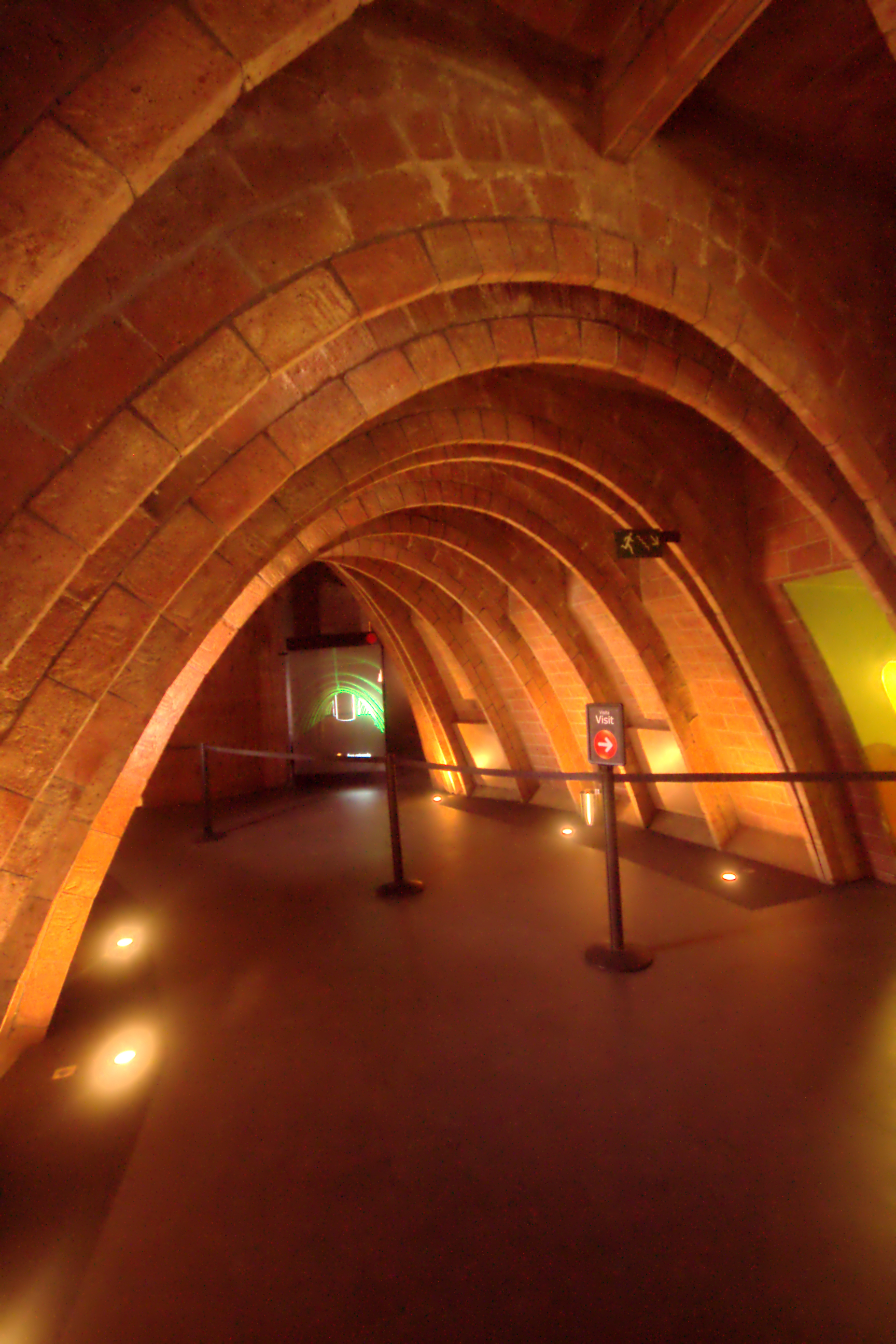
The attic

Like in Casa Batlló, Gaudí shows the application of the catenary arch as a support structure for the roof, a form which he had already used shortly after graduating in the wood frameworks of Mataró's cooperative known as "L'Obrera Mataronense." In this case, Gaudí used the Catalan technique of timbrel, imported from Italy in the fourteenth century.

The attic, where the laundry rooms were located, was a clear room under a Catalan vault roof supported by 270 parabolic vaults of different heights and spaced by about 80 cm. The roof resembles both the ribs of a huge animal and a palm, giving the roof-deck a very unconventional shape similar to a landscape of hills and valleys. The shape and location of the courtyards makes the arches higher when the space is narrowed and lower when the space expands.

The builder Bayó explained its construction: "First the face of a wide wall was filled with mortar and plastered. Then Canaleta indicated the opening of each arch and Bayó put a nail at each starting point of the arch at the top of the wall. From these nails was dangled a chain so that the lowest point coincided with the deflection of the arch. Then the profile displayed on the wall by the chain was drawn and on this profile the carpenter marked and placed the corresponding centering, and the timbrel vault was started with three rows of plane bricks. Gaudí wanted to add a longitudinal axis of bricks connecting all vaults at their keystones".

==== Roof and chimneys ====
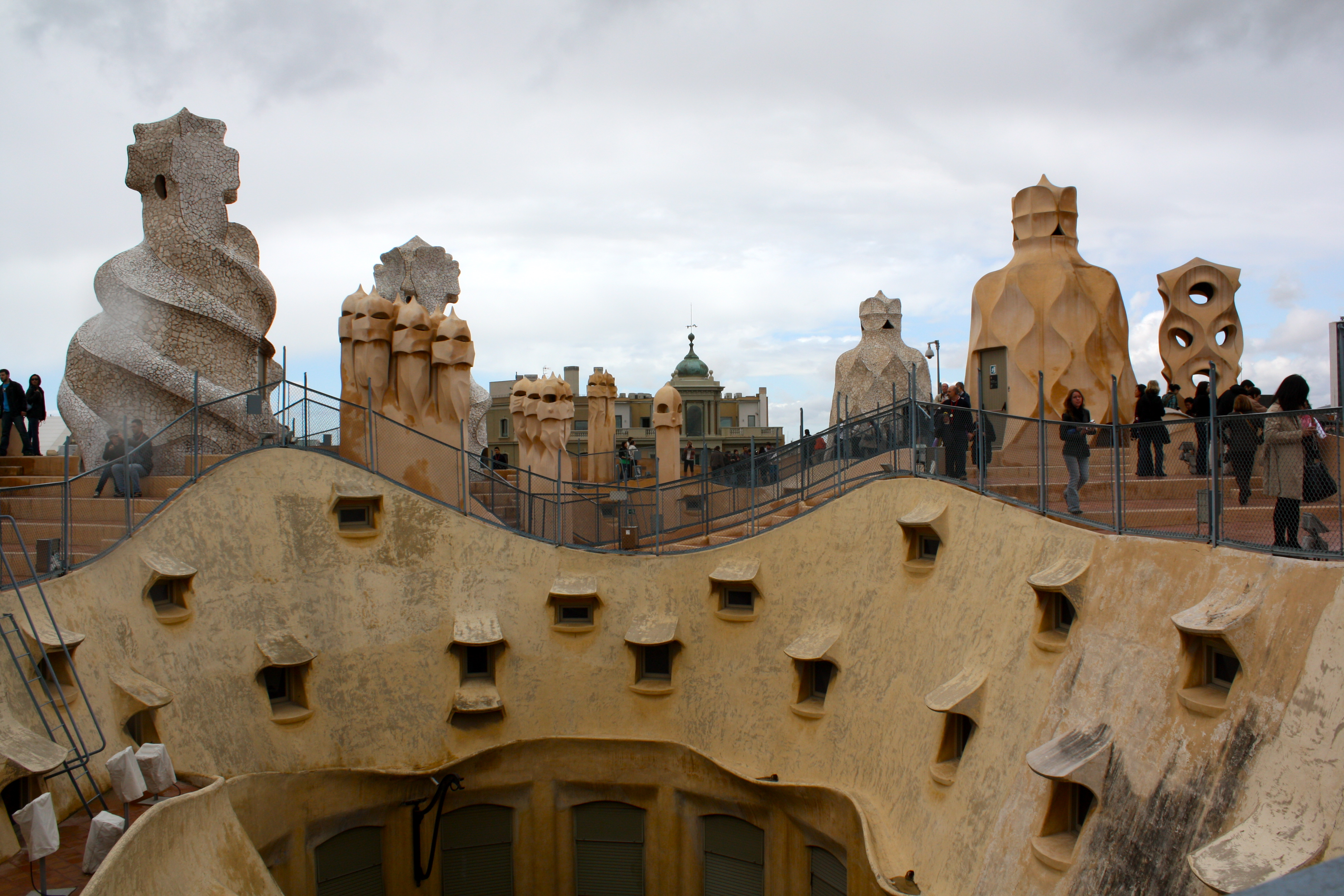
Casa Milà roof architecture, chimneys known as espanta bruixes (witch scarers)

On the rooftop there are six skylights/staircase exits (four of which were covered with broken pottery and some that ended in a double cross typical of Gaudí), twenty-eight chimneys in several groupings, two half-hidden vents whose function is to renew the air in the building, and four domes that discharged to the facade. The staircases also house the water tanks; some of which are snail-shaped.

The stepped roof of La Pedrera, called "the garden of warriors" by the poet Pere Gimferrer because the chimneys appear to be protecting the skylights, has undergone a radical restoration, removing chimneys added in interventions after Gaudí, television antennas, and other elements that degraded the space. The restoration brought back the splendor to the chimneys and the skylights that were covered with fragments of marble and broken Valencia tiles. One of the chimneys was topped with glass pieces – it was said that Gaudí did that the day after the inauguration of the building, taking advantage of the empty bottles from the party. It was restored with the bases of champagne bottles from the early twentieth century. The repair work has enabled the restoration of the original impact of the overhangs made of stone from Ulldecona with fragments of tiles. This whole set is more colorful than the facade, although here the creamy tones are dominant.

==== Furniture ====
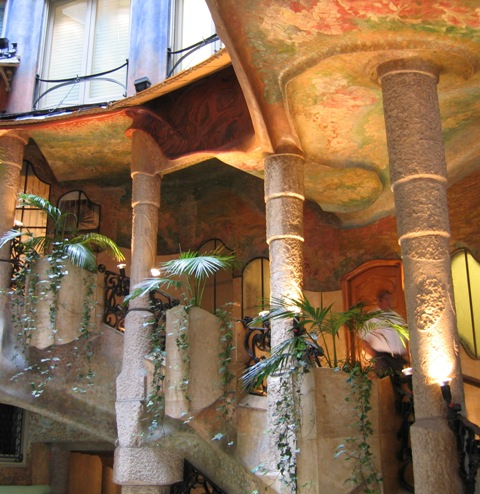
The building's inside decor (pictured in 2005) has been changed several times, both paint and furniture

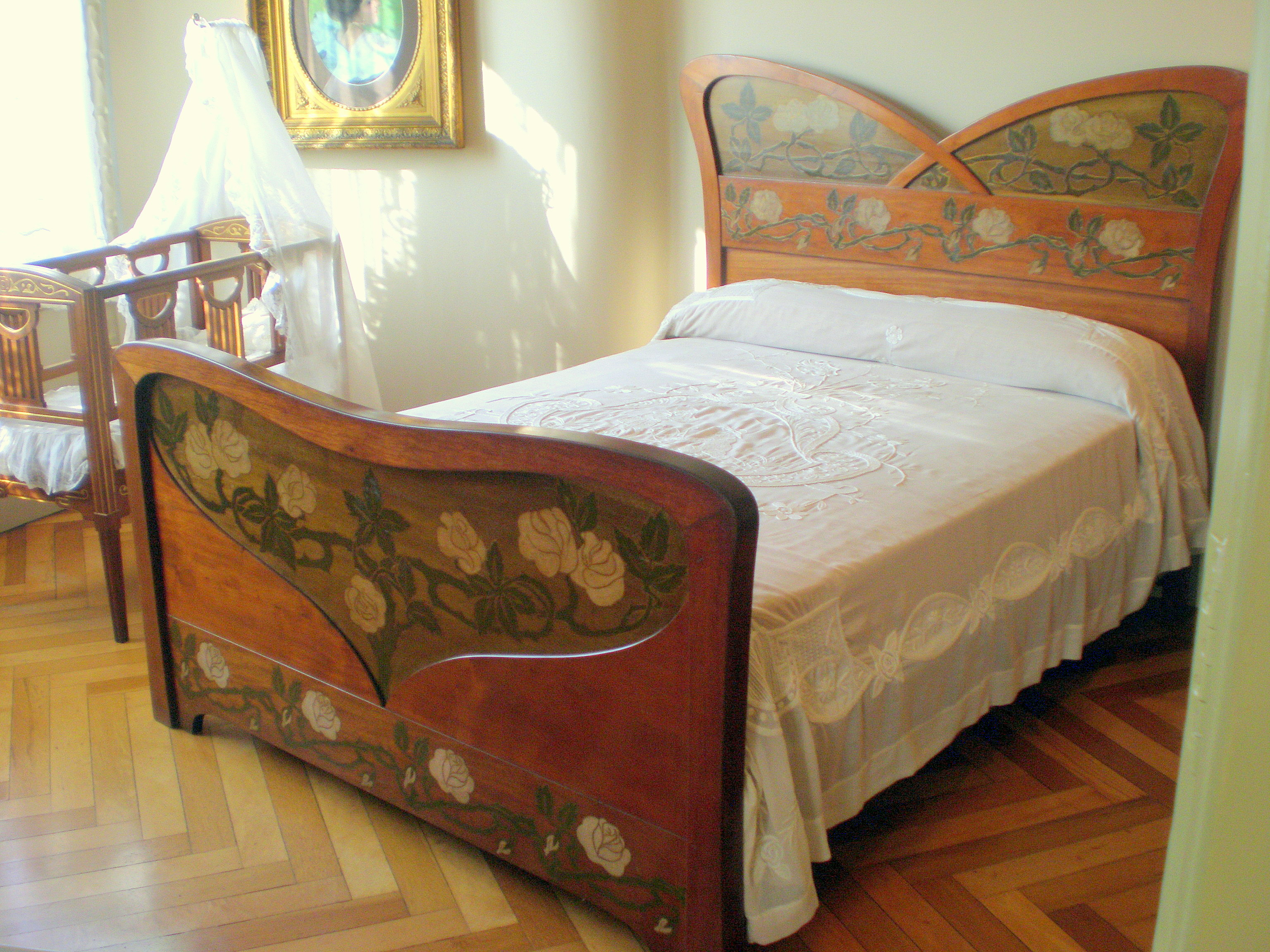
Furniture in 2008

Gaudí, as he had done in Casa Batlló, designed furniture specifically for the main floor. This was part of the concept artwork itself integral to modernism in which the architect assumed responsibility for global issues such as the structure and the facade, as well as every detail of the decor, designing furniture and accessories such as lamps, planters, floors or ceilings.

This was another point of friction with Segimon, who complained that there was no straight wall to place her Steinway piano. Gaudí's response was blunt: "So play the violin." The result of these disagreements has been the loss of the decorative legacy of Gaudí, as most of the furniture was removed due to climate change and the changes she made to the main floor when Gaudí died. Some remain in private collections, including a curtain made of oak 4 m. long by 1.96 m. high in the Museum of Catalan Modernism; and a chair and desktop of Milà.

Gaudí carved oak doors similar to what he had done for the Casa y Bardes, but these were only included on two floors as when Segimon discovered the price, she decided there would be no more at that quality.

== Architecture ==
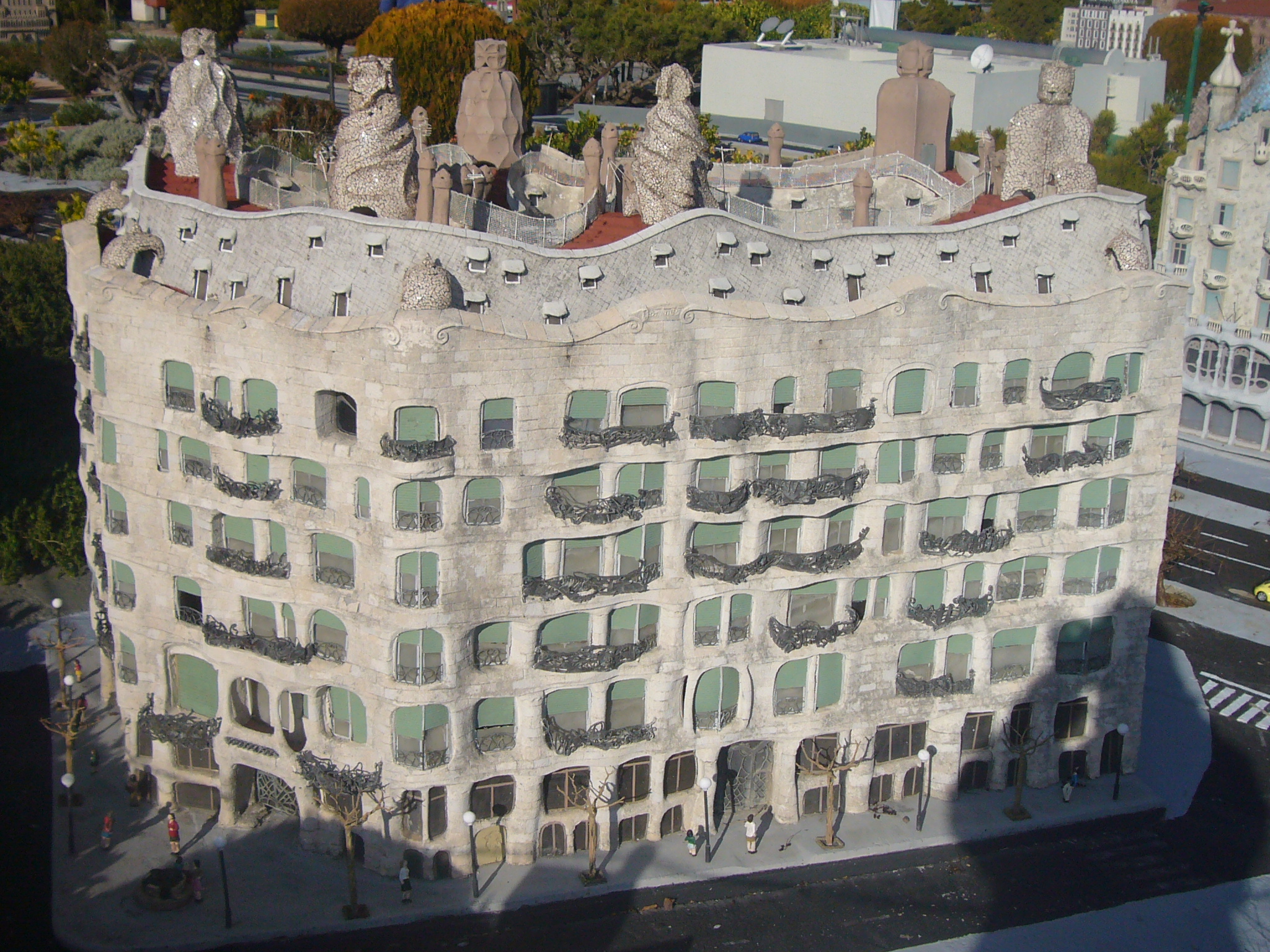
Scale model at the Catalunya en Miniatura park

Casa Milà is part of the UNESCO World Heritage Site "Works of Antoni Gaudí". It was a predecessor of some buildings with a similar biomorphic appearance:

- the 1921 Einstein Tower in Potsdam, designed by Erich Mendelsohn
- Solomon R. Guggenheim Museum in Manhattan, New York, designed by Frank Lloyd Wright
- Chapelle Notre Dame du Haut, Ronchamp, France, designed by Le Corbusier
- the Hundertwasserhaus and other works by Austrian architect Friedensreich Hundertwasser
- Disney Concert Hall in Los Angeles, by Frank Gehry

Free exhibitions often are held on the first floor, which also provides some opportunity to see the interior design. There is a charge for entrance to the apartment on the fourth floor and the roof. The other floors are not open to visitors.

=== Constructive similarities ===
Gaudí's La Pedrera was inspired by a mountain, but there is no agreement as to which mountain was the reference model. Joan Bergós thought it was the rocks of Fray Guerau in Prades mountains. Joan Matamala thought that the model could have been St. Miquel del Fai, while the sculptor Vicente Vilarubias believed it was inspired by the cliffs Torrent Pareis in Menorca. Other options include the mountains of Uçhisar in Cappadocia, suggested by Juan Goytisolo, or Mola Gallifa, suggested by Louis Permanyer, based on the fact that Gaudí visited the area in 1885 to escape an outbreak of cholera in Barcelona.

Some people say that the interior layout of La Pedrera comes from studies that Gaudí made of medieval fortresses. This image is reinforced by the seeming appearance of the rooftop chimneys as "sentinels" with great helmets. The structure of the iron door in the lobby does not follow any symmetry, straight or repetitive pattern. Rather, it evokes bubbles of soap that are formed between the hands or the structures of a plant cell.

== Criticism and controversy ==
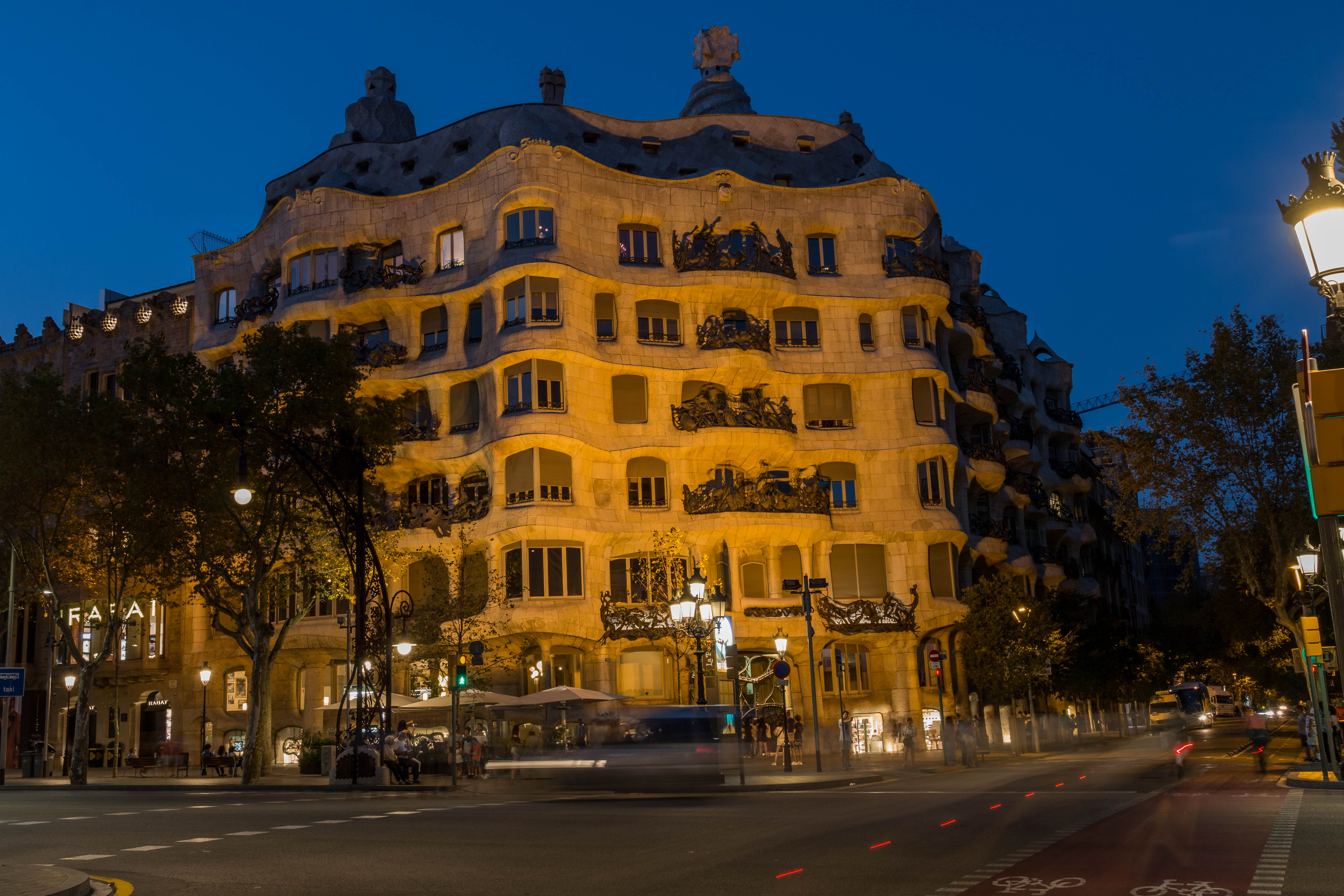
Casa Milà at night

The building's unconventional style made it the subject of much criticism. It was given the nickname "La Pedrera", meaning "the quarry". Casa Milà appeared in many satirical magazines. Joan Junceda presented it as a traditional "Easter cake" by means of cartoons in Patufet. Joaquim Garcia made a joke about the difficulty of setting the damask wrought iron balconies in his magazine. Homeowners in Passeig de Gracia became angry with Milà and ceased to greet him, arguing that the weird building by Gaudí would lower the price of land in the area.

=== Administrative problems ===
Casa Milà also caused some administrative problems. In December 1907 the City Hall stopped work on the building because of a pillar which occupied part of the sidewalk, not respecting the alignment of facades. Again on August 17, 1908, more problems occurred when the building surpassed the predicted height and borders of its construction site by 4,000 square metres (43,000 ft^{2}). The Council called for a fine of 100,000 pesetas (approximately 25% of the cost of work) or for the demolition of the attic and roof. The dispute was resolved a year and a half later, December 28, 1909, when the Commission certified that it was a monumental building and thus not required to have a 'strict compliance' with the bylaws.

=== Design competitions ===
The owner entered La Pedrera in the annual Barcelona Artistic Buildings Competition sponsored by the Barcelona City Council (Ayuntament). Other entries in the competition included two works by Sagnier (Calle Mallorca 264, and one on Corsica and Av. Diagonal), the Casa Gustà by architect Jaume Gustà, and the Casa Pérez Samanillo, designed by Joan Josep Hervàs. Although the most dramatic and clear favorite was Casa Milà, the jury opined that even though the facades were complete, "there's still a lot left to do before it's fully completed, finalized and in a perfect state of appreciation." The winner in 1910 was Samanillo Perez, for his building which now houses the headquarters of the Circulo Ecuestre.

=== Design disagreements ===
Gaudí's relations with Segimon deteriorated during the construction and decoration of the house. There were many disagreements between them, one example being the monumental bronze virgin del Rosario, which Gaudí wanted as the statue on the front of the building in homage to the name of the owner, that the artist Carles Mani i Roig was to sculpt. The statue was not made although the words "Ave gratia M plena Dominus tecum" were written at the top of the facade. Continuing disagreements led Gaudí to take Milà to court over his fees. The lawsuit was won by Gaudí in 1916, and he gave the 105,000 pesetas he won in the case to charity, stating that "the principles mattered more than money." Milà was having to pay the mortgage.

After Gaudí's death in 1926, Segimon got rid of most of the furniture that Gaudí had designed and covered over parts of Gaudí's designs with new decorations in the style of Louis XVI. La Pedrera was acquired in 1986 by Caixa Catalunya and when restoration was done four years later, some of the original decorations re-emerged.

When the Civil War broke out in July 1936, the Milàs were on vacation. Part of the building was collectivized by the Unified Socialist Party of Catalonia; the Milàs fled the area with some artwork.

== In media and literature ==
- A scene in The Passenger (Italian: Professione: reporter), a film directed by Michelangelo Antonioni and starring Jack Nicholson and Maria Schneider, was filmed on the roof of the building.
- A scene filmed on the roof in the 2008 film Vicky Cristina Barcelona, directed by Woody Allen.
- A major part in the story "A murderer is born" in the novel Seiobo There Below by László Krasznahorkai happens here
- Mentioned in the book by Eoin Colfer Artemis Fowl and the Lost Colony
- Mentioned in the book by Trudi Alexy The Mezuzah in the Madonna's Foot
- Mentioned in the 'Ballrooms and Biscotti' episode (season 4, episode 1) of Gilmore Girls
- Several scenes in the film, Gaudi Afternoon
- A scale model exhibited at the Catalunya en Miniatura park.
- Featured in the music video for Deep Forest's song 'Sweet Lullaby'
- The home of Edmond Kirsch in Dan Brown's novel Origin, the 5th book featuring Robert Langdon.

== Gallery ==
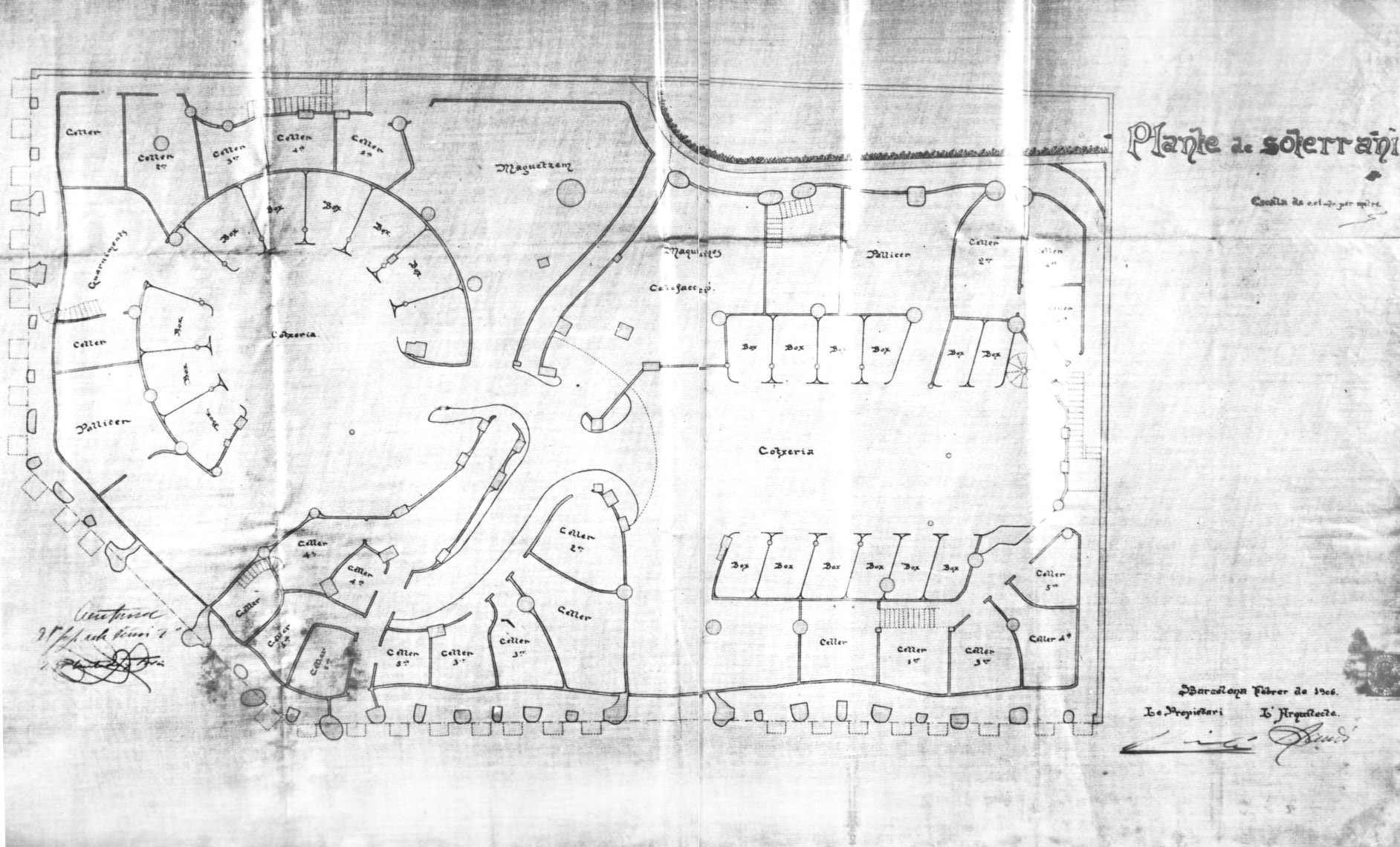
Design in 1906

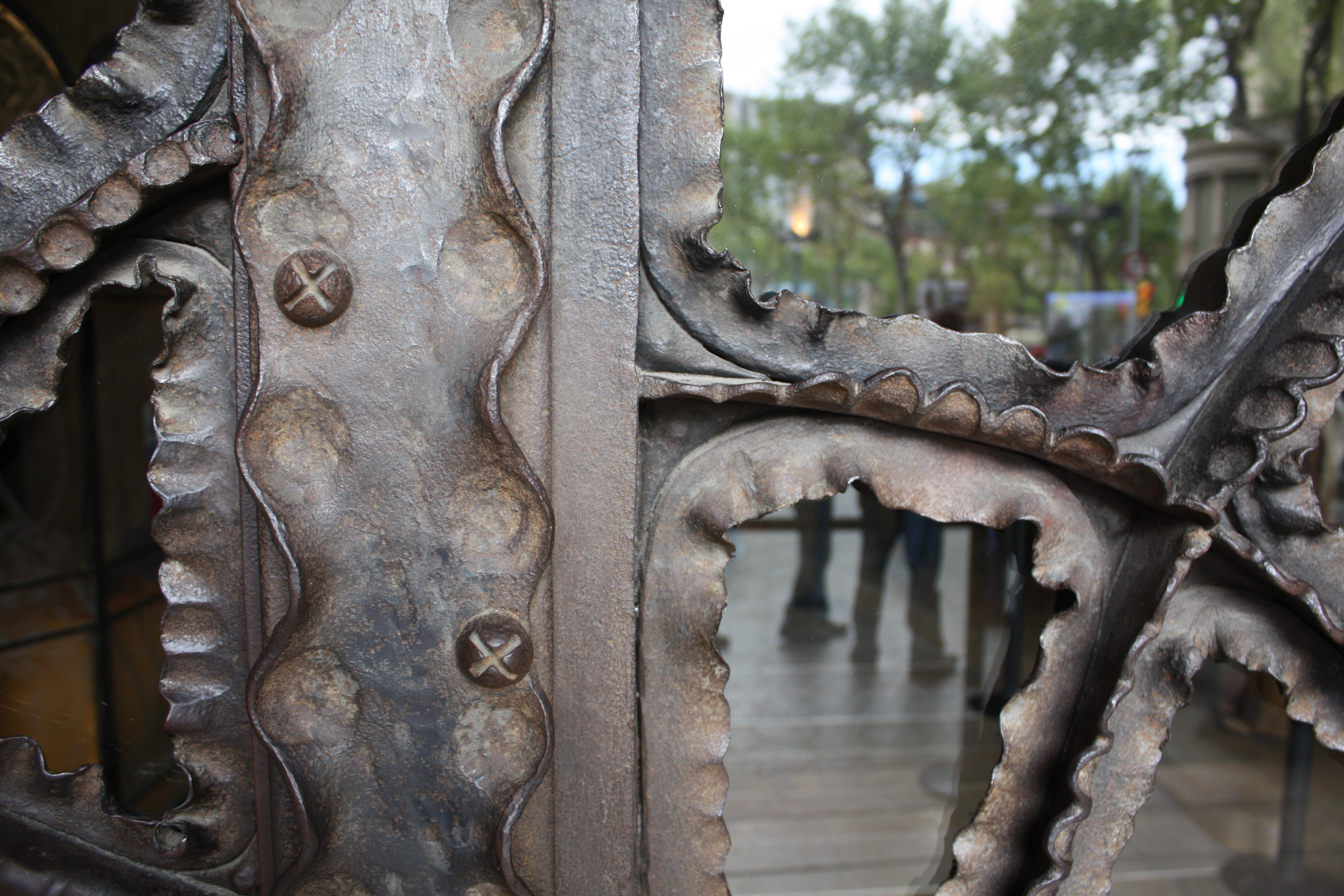
Ironwork on the main gate

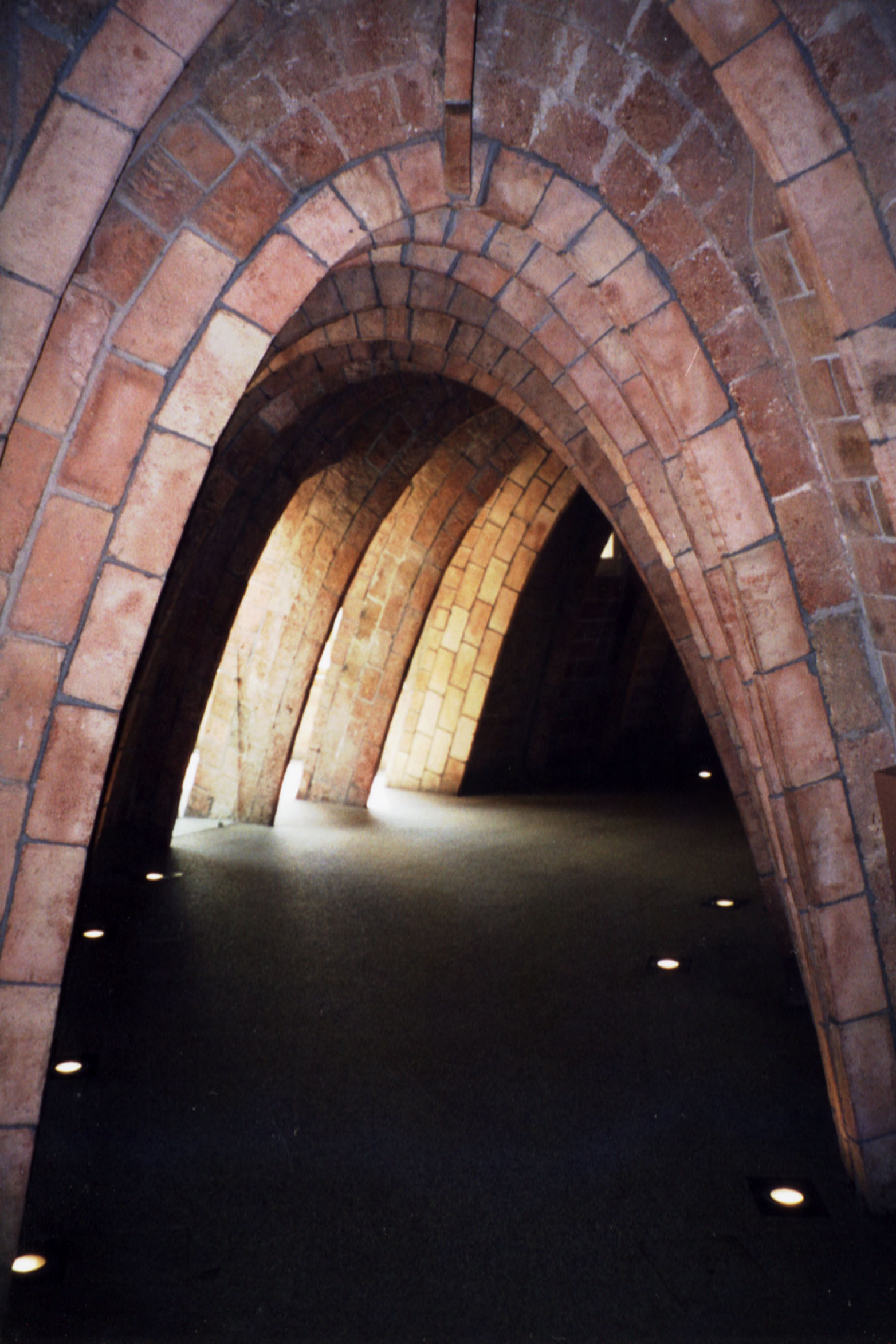
Catenary arches under the terrace of Casa Milà

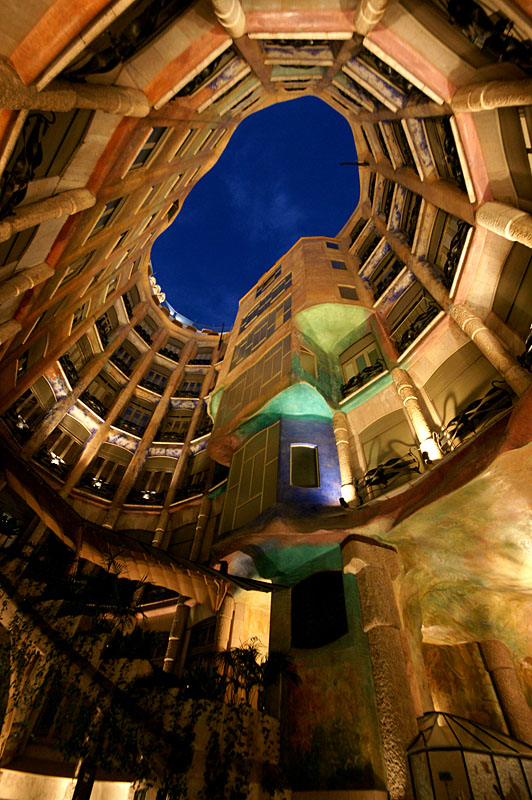
Casa Milà atrium at dusk, after restoration

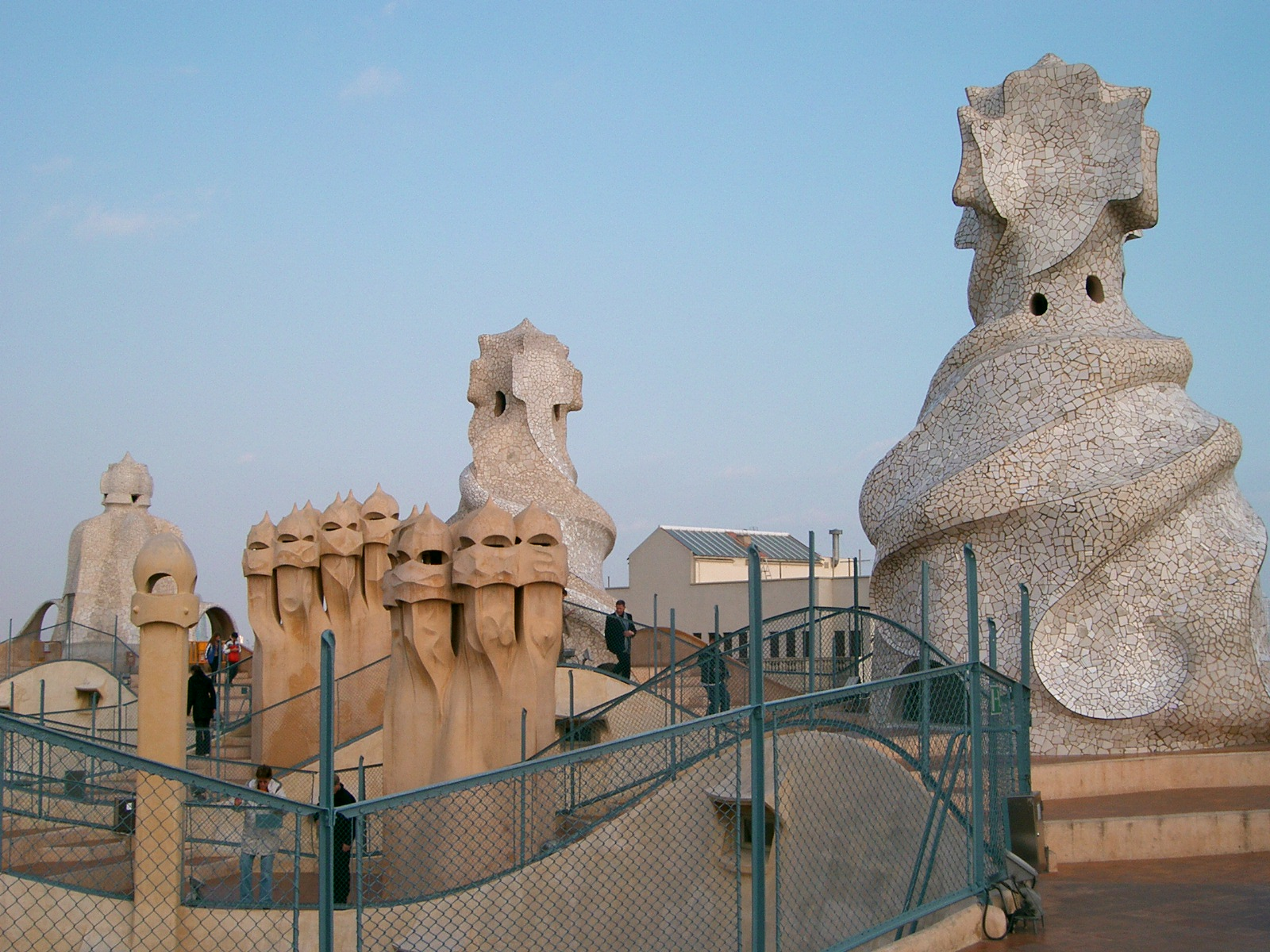
Casa Milà rooftop in Spring

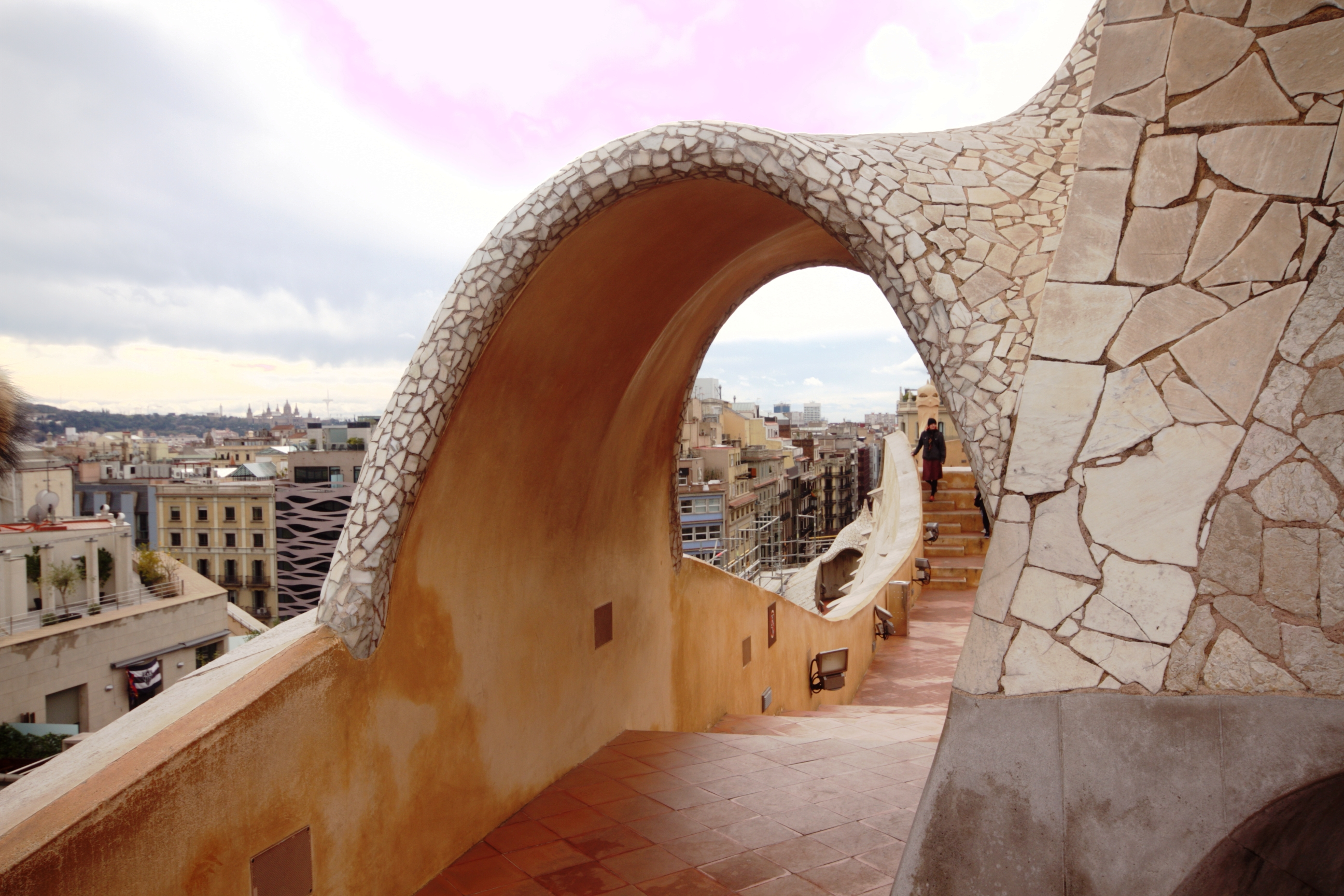
Arch on the roof

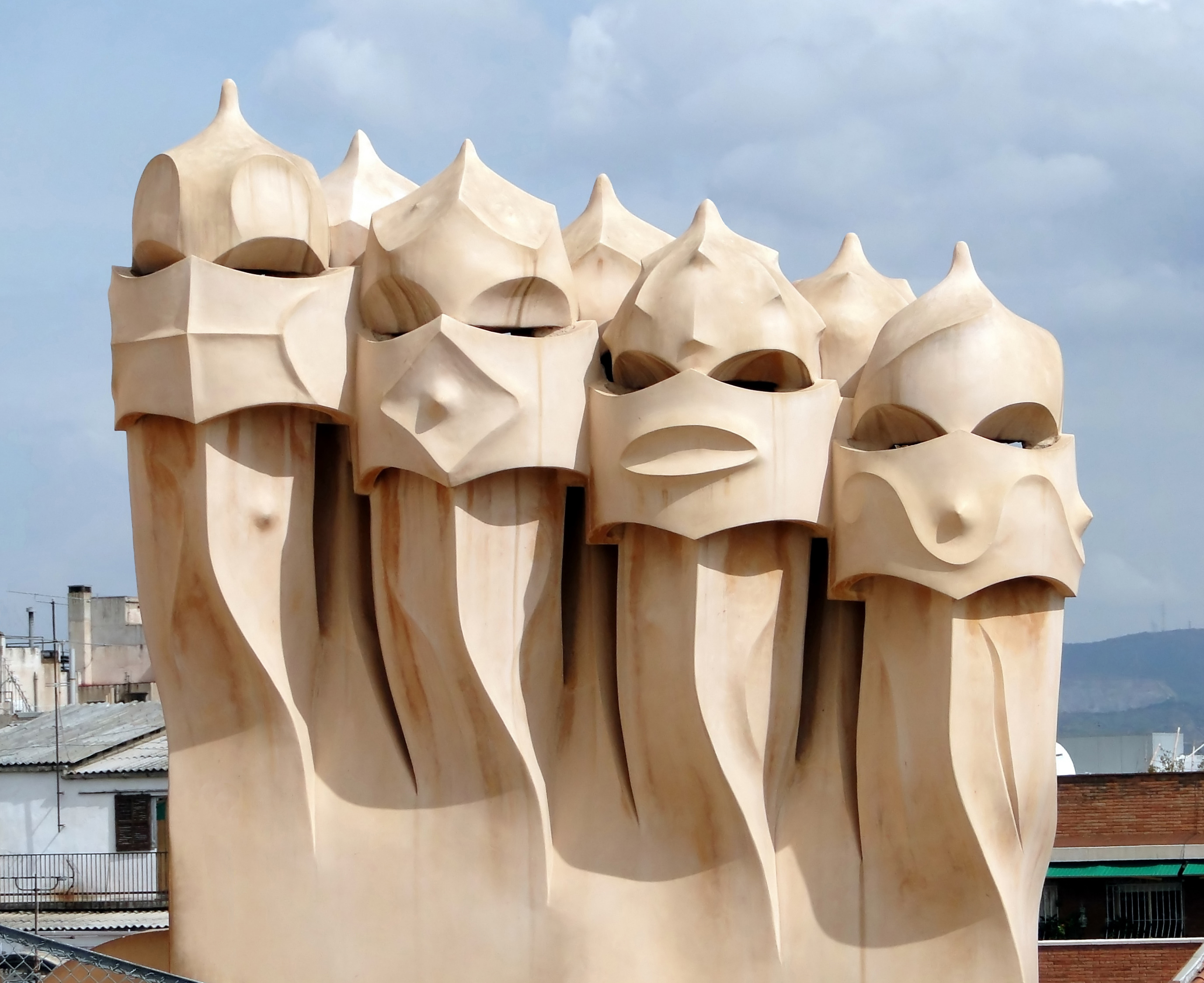
Ventilation towers

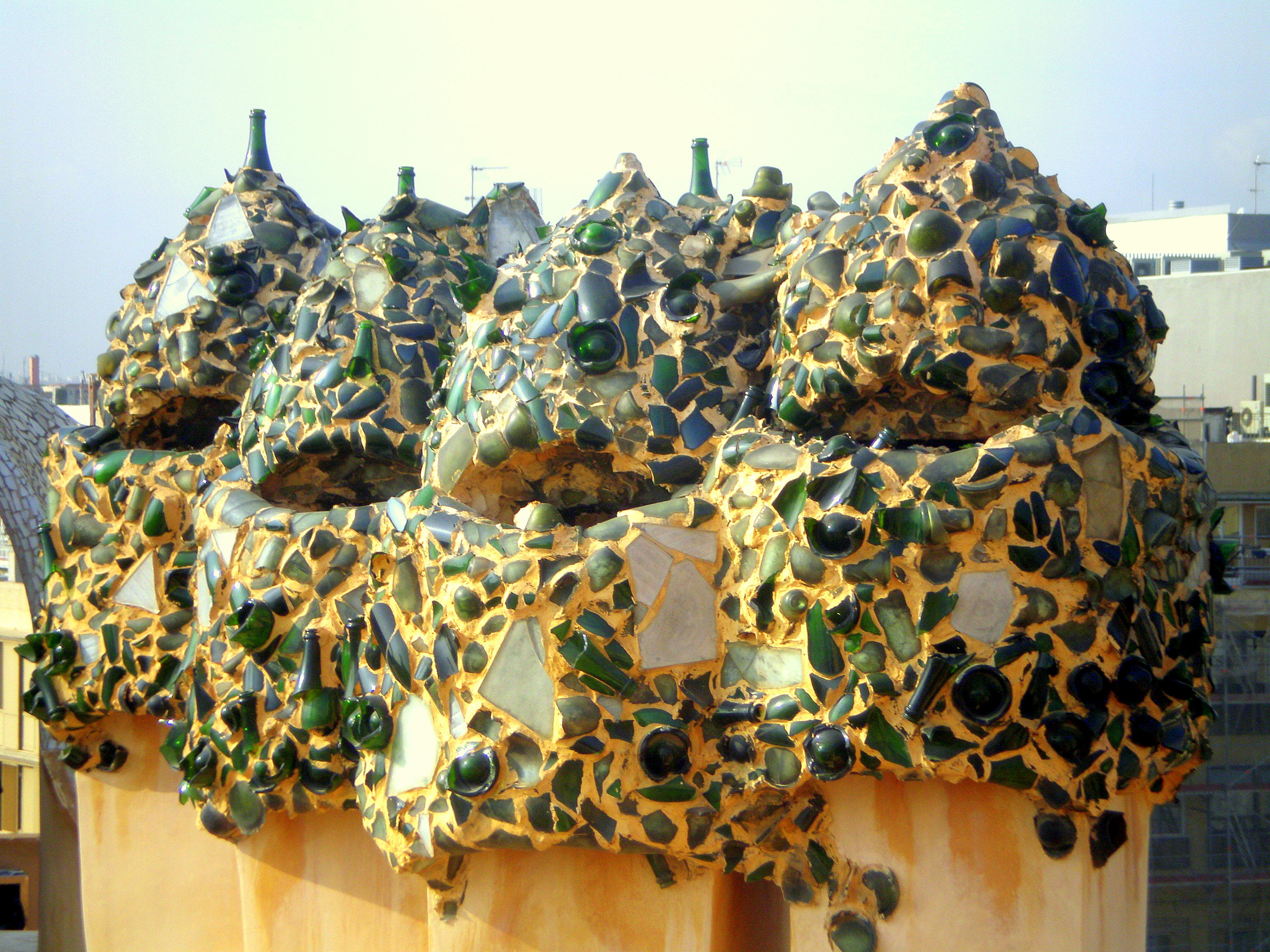
Glass towers on the roof

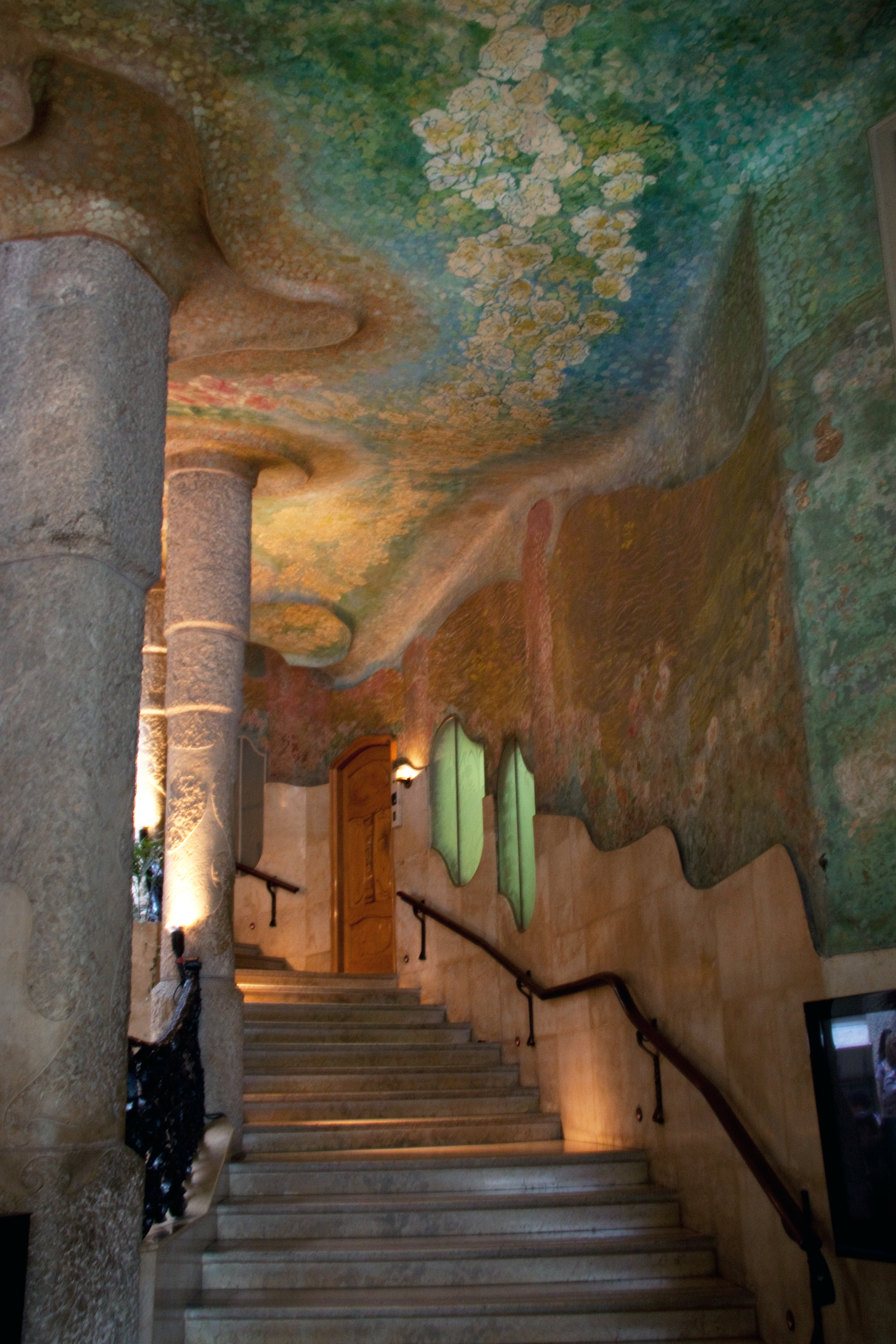
Staircase

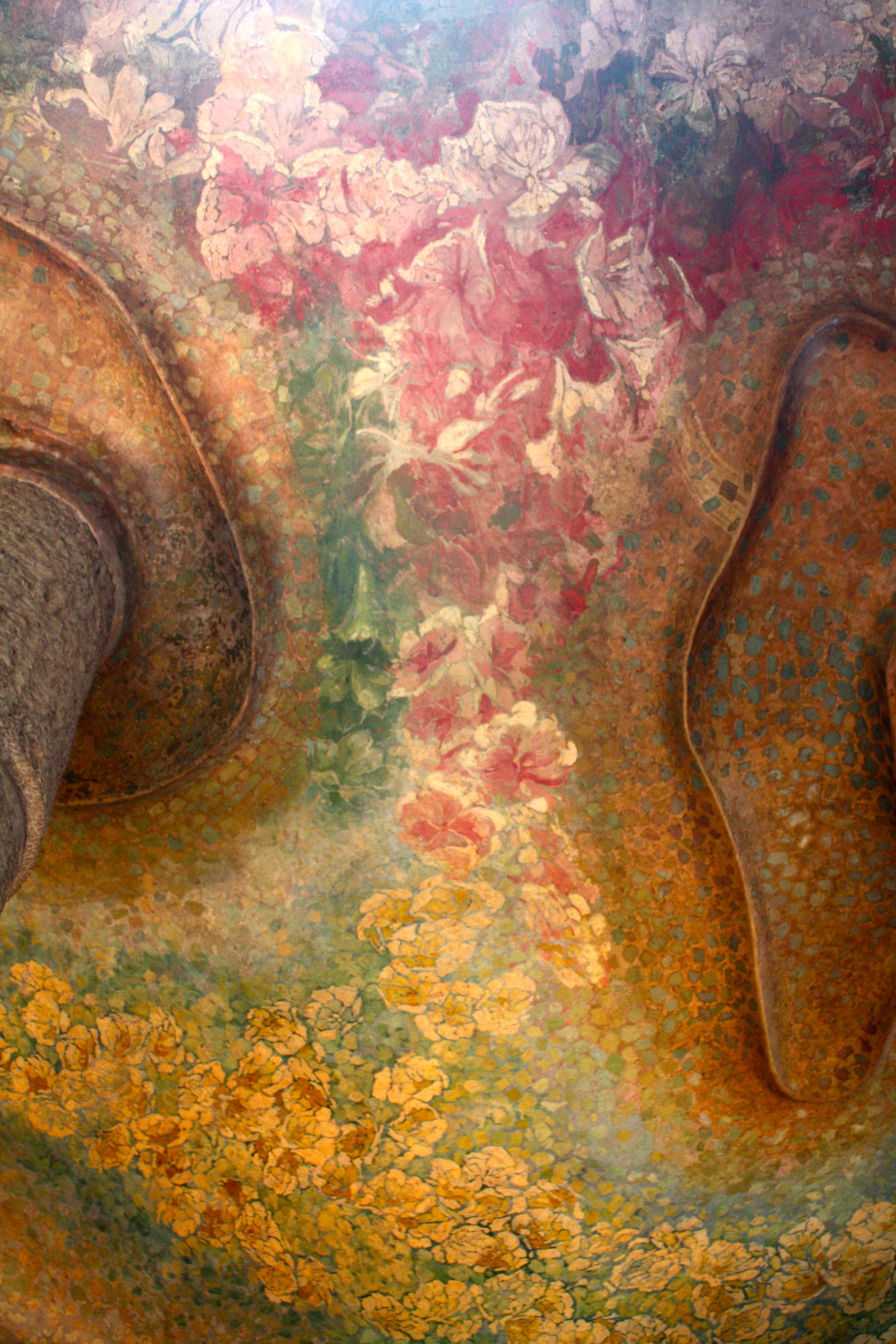
Paintings on the ceiling

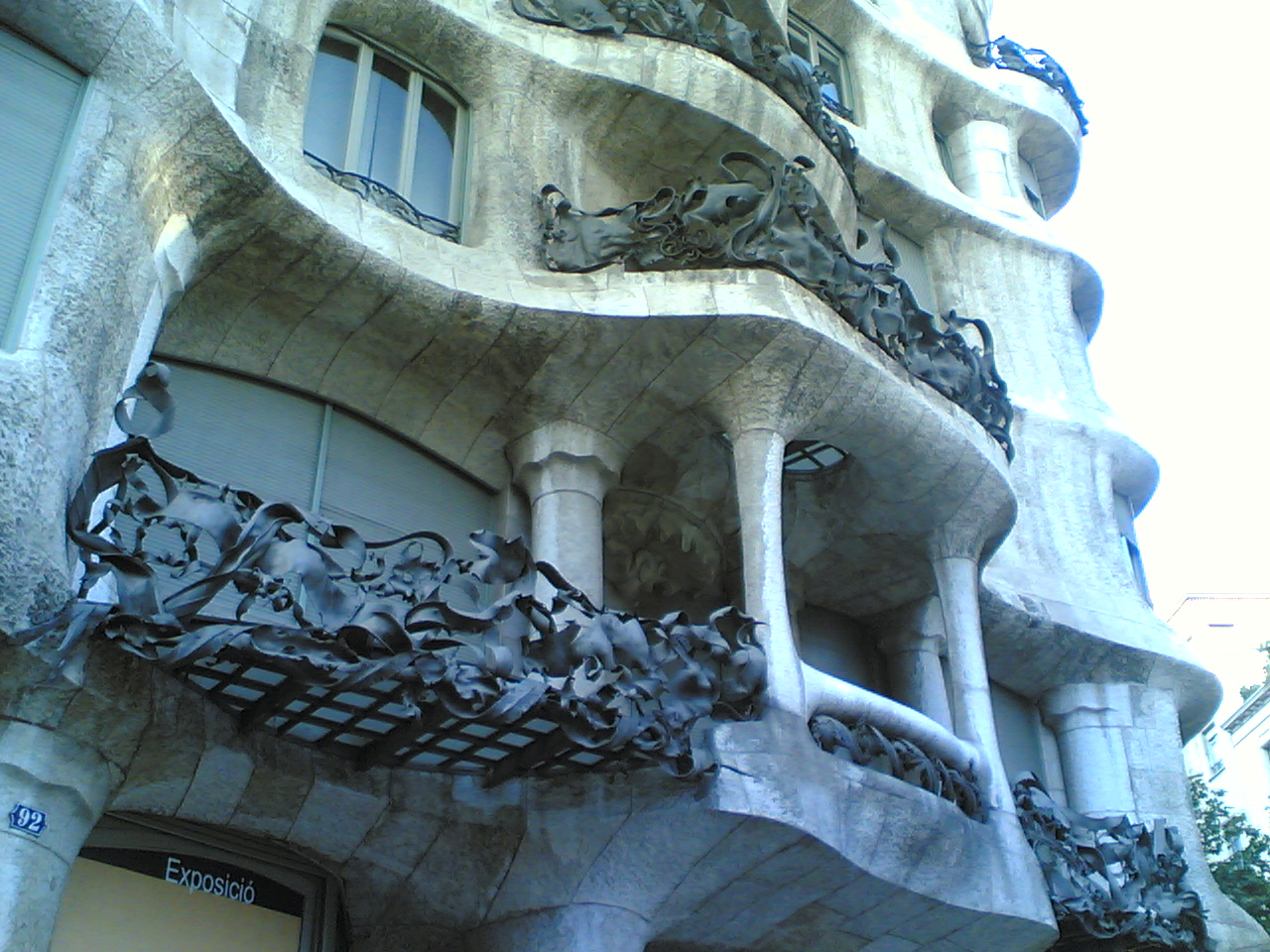
Detail of an original balcony

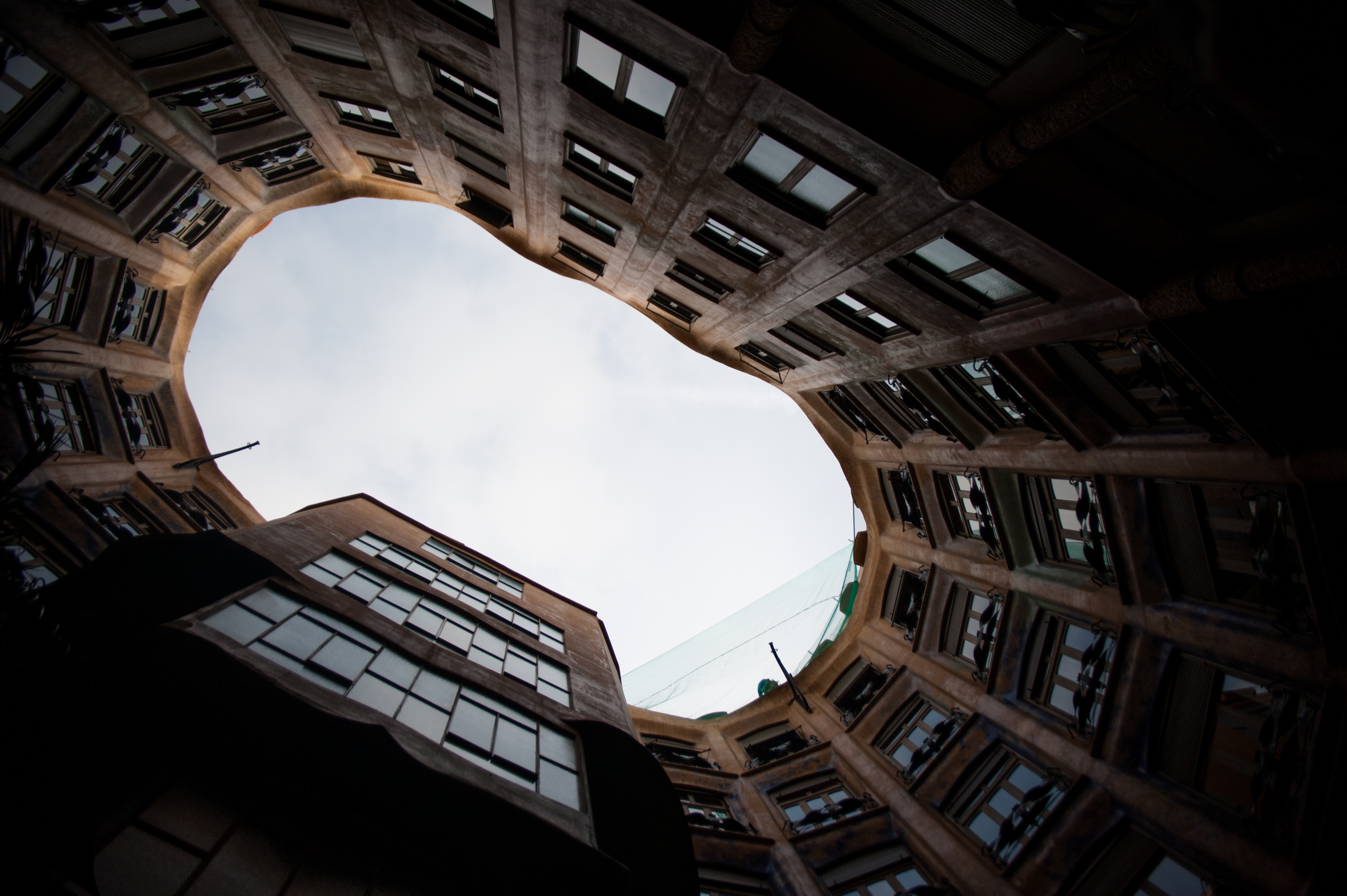
Atrium

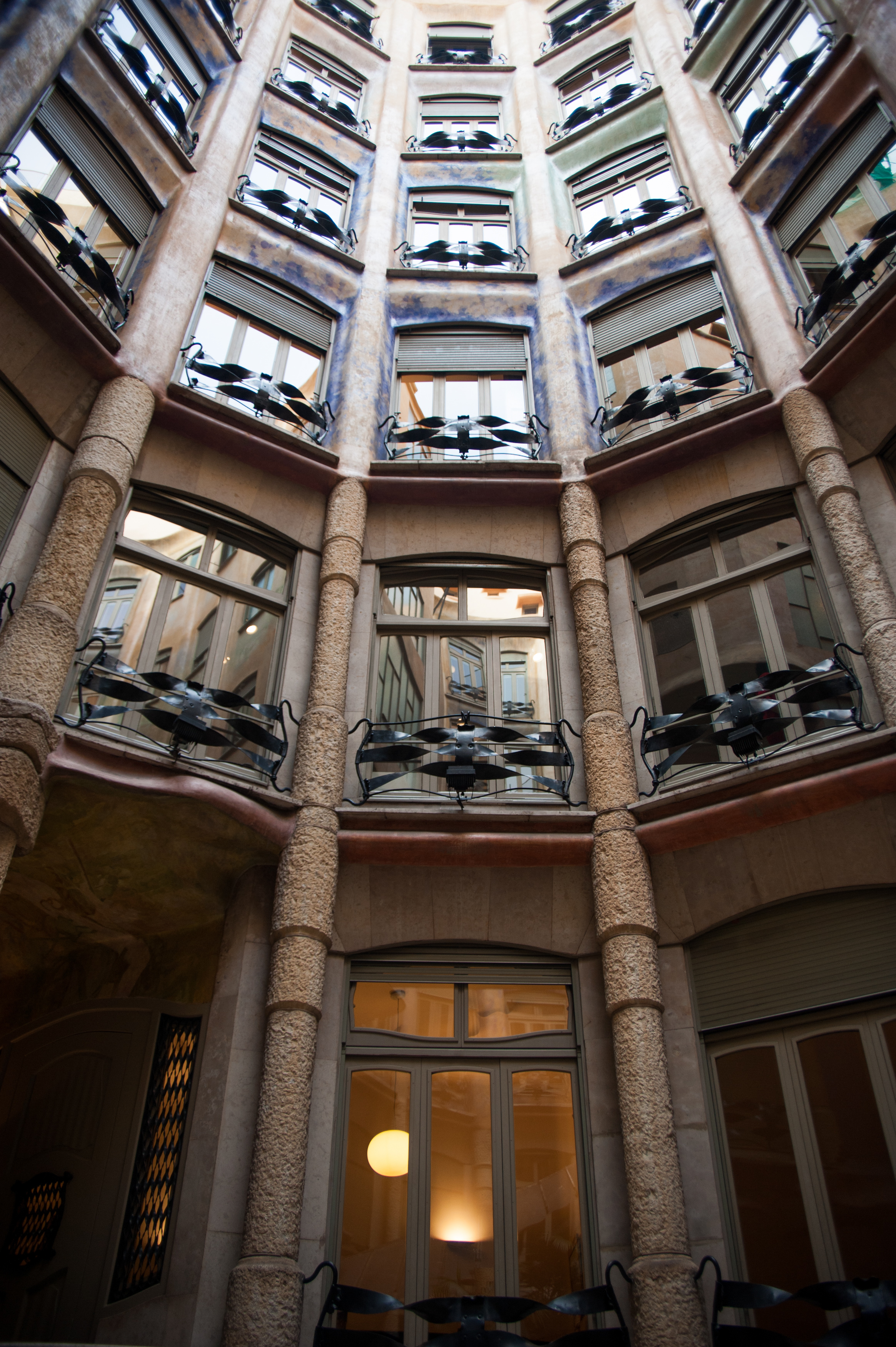
Atrium

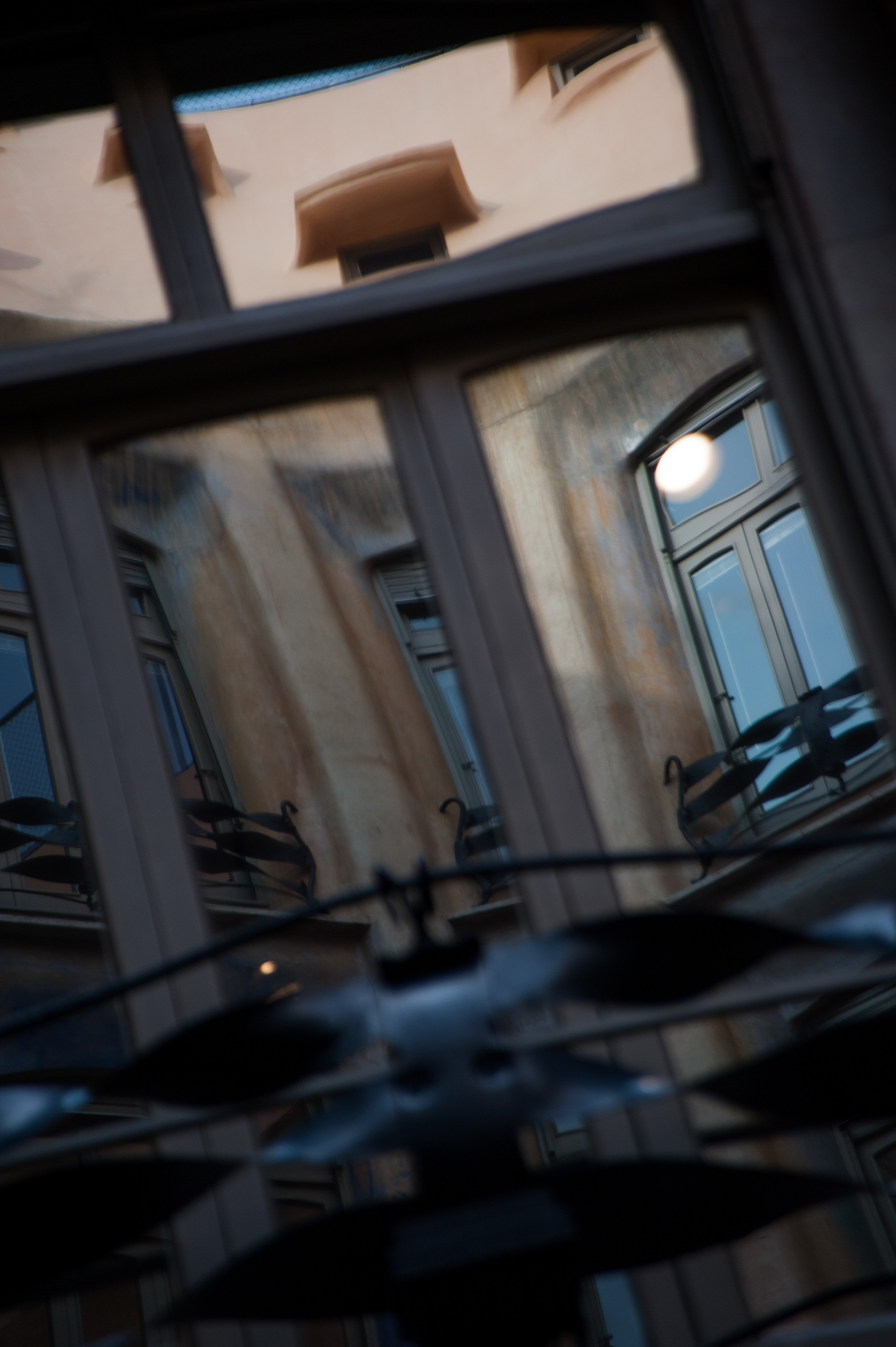
Atrium reflections

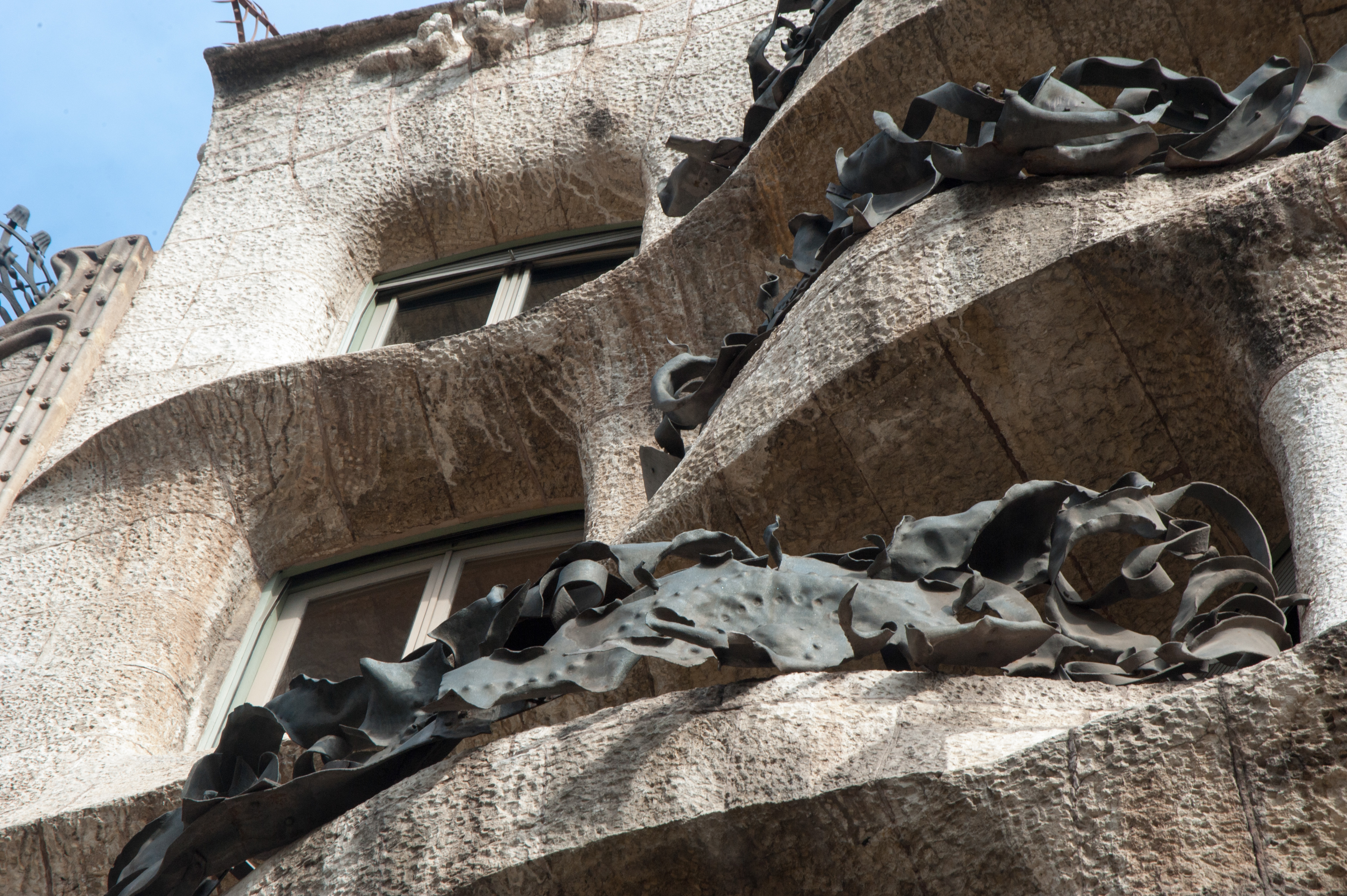
Exterior details

== See also ==
- List of Gaudí buildings
- List of Modernisme buildings in Barcelona
