= Clare Peploe =

British film producer and scriptwriter (1941–2021)

- Born: Clare Frances Katherine Peploe; 20 October 1941; Dar es Salaam, Tanganyika (now Tanzania)
- Died: 23 June 2021 (aged 79); Rome, Italy
- Occupations: Film director; Film producer; Screenwriter
- Years active: 1962–2018
- Spouse: Bernardo Bertolucci (m. 1979; died 2018)
- Relatives: Mark Peploe (brother)

Clare Peploe (20 October 1941 – 23 June 2021) was a British-Italian screenwriter, producer and film director.

== Biography ==
Peploe was born in Tanzania but grew up in the United Kingdom and Italy. William Peploe, her father, worked as a British civil servant before becoming an art dealer and then director of London's Lefevre Gallery. Clotilde Brewster von Hildebrand, her mother, was an artist. Her younger brother was writer-director Mark Peploe.

Peploe studied at the Sorbonne and the University of Perugia.

Peploe debuted as a director with the short comic film Couples and Robbers (1981), produced by Christine Oestreicher, which received both Oscar and BAFTA nominations. Richard Roud's review in the Guardian Weekly praised her casting and direction of the actors; he hoped funding would become available for a feature film, but throughout her career she struggled to obtain funding, eventually realizing that being married to a famous filmmaker, Bernardo Bertolucci, was more of a hindrance than a help.

Her films characteristically mixed genres and attracted well-known actors, e.g., Jacqueline Bisset, Irene Papas, Kenneth Branagh, Bridget Fonda and Russell Crowe. Her third feature, Triumph of Love, competed at the 2001 Venice Film Festival and was nominated for the Golden Lion Award. It was based on an 18th-century French stage play by Pierre de Marivaux, and included Ben Kingsley and Mira Sorvino in its cast.

Peploe is credited with co-writing the 1970 cult film Zabriskie Point with Michelangelo Antonioni and others. Before marrying Bertolucci, Peploe worked as assistant director on his 1900 in 1976, although when she was directing her own films she banned him from her sets because he intimidated her crew. As a screenwriter, she collaborated frequently with him. Her brother Mark co-wrote Bertolucci's The Last Emperor (1987), for which the two men shared a screenwriting Oscar.

Peploe died in Rome on 23 June 2021, aged 79.

== Works ==
=== Screenwriter ===
- Zabriskie Point (1970)
- La Luna (1979)
- Rough Magic (1995)
- Besieged (1998)
- Triumph of Love (2001)

=== Director ===
- Couples and Robbers (1981)
- High Season (1987)
- Rough Magic (1995)
- Triumph of Love (2001)
