= List of French films of 2011 =

A list of films produced in France in 2011.

Title	Director	Cast	Genre	Notes
15 Lads	Romain Cogitore	François Civil, Grégoire Colin, Jules Sitruk, Michel Vuillermoz, Ralph Amoussou	War drama	
A Gang Story	Olivier Marchal	Gérard Lanvin, Tchéky Karyo	Drama	
Americano	Mathieu Demy	Mathieu Demy, Salma Hayek, Geraldine Chaplin	Drama	
The Artist	Michel Hazanavicius	Jean Dujardin, Bérénice Bejo	Comedy drama	
Beloved	Christophe Honoré	Catherine Deneuve, Miloš Forman, Ludivine Sagnier	Comedy drama	
Black Gold	Jean-Jacques Annaud	Tahar Rahim, Mark Strong, Antonio Banderas	Drama	
A Burning Hot Summer	Philippe Garrel	Monica Bellucci, Louis Garrel, Céline Sallette	Drama	French–Italian–Swiss co-production
Chicken with Plums	Marjane Satrapi, Vincent Paronnaud	Mathieu Amalric, Édouard Baer, Maria de Medeiros	Comedy drama	Belgian–French–German co-production
Colombiana	Olivier Megaton	Zoe Saldaña, Michael Vartan	Action	French–American co-production
The Conquest	Xavier Durringer	Denis Podalydès, Bernard Le Coq, Florence Pernel	Drama	
Declaration of War	Valérie Donzelli	Valérie Donzelli, Jérémie Elkaïm	Drama	
Father	Pasquale Squitieri	Franco Nero, Andrea Fachinetti, Claudia Cardinale	Thriller	
Forces spéciales	Stéphane Rybojad	Diane Kruger, Djimon Hounsou, Benoît Magimel	Action	
Free Men	Ismaël Ferroukhi	Tahar Rahim, Michael Lonsdale	War drama	
Goodbye First Love	Mia Hansen-Løve	Lola Créton, Sebastian Urzendowsky, Magne-Håvard Brekke	Drama	French-German co-production
Heat Wave	Jean-Jacques Jauffret	Adèle Haenel, Sylvie Lachat, Ulysse Grosjean	Drama	
House of Tolerance	Bertrand Bonello	Hafsia Herzi, Jasmine Trinca, Adèle Haenel	Drama	
The Incident	Alexandre Courtes	Rupert Evans, Kenny Doughty, Joseph Kennedy	Horror	
The Intouchables	Olivier Nakache and Éric Toledano	François Cluzet, Omar Sy	Comedy drama	
Jimmy Rivière	Teddy Lussi-Modeste	Guillaume Gouix, Béatrice Dalle, Hafsia Herzi	Drama	
Kurosawa's Way	Catherine Cadou	Bernardo Bertolucci, Julie Taymor, Theo Angelopoulos	Documentary	
The Lady	Luc Besson	Michelle Yeoh, David Thewlis	Drama	British–French co-production
Livid	Julien Maury and Alexandre Bustillo	Béatrice Dalle, Jérémy Kapone, Catherine Jacob	Horror	
The Minister	Pierre Schöller	Olivier Gourmet, Michel Blanc, Zabou Breitman	Drama	Belgian–French co-production
The Monk	Dominik Moll	Vincent Cassel, Déborah François, Catherine Mouchet	Drama	French–Spanish co-production
A Monster in Paris	Bibo Bergeron	Matthieu Chedid, Vanessa Paradis	Family film	
Nothing to Declare	Dany Boon	Benoît Poelvoorde, Dany Boon	Comedy	
Outside Satan	Bruno Dumont	David Dewaele, Alexandra Lematre, Valerie Mestdagh	Drama	
Pater	Alain Cavalier	Vincent Lindon	Drama	
Polisse	Maïwenn Le Besco	Karin Viard, Joeystarr	Drama	
The Rabbi's Cat	Joann Sfar	François Morel, Hafsia Herzi, Maurice Bénichou	Adventure	Animated film
The Silence of Joan	Philippe Ramos	Clémence Poésy, Thierry Frémont	Drama	
Le Skylab	Julie Delpy	Bernadette Lafont, Emmanuelle Riva	Comedy	
Sleepless Night	Frederic Jardin	Tomer Sisley, Adel Bencherif, Julien Boisselier	Thriller	French–Belgian–Luxembourgian co-production
Smugglers' Songs	Rabah Ameur-Zaïmeche	Jacques Nolot	Adventure	
The Snows of Kilimanjaro	Robert Guédiguian	Ariane Ascaride, Jean-Pierre Darroussin	Drama	
The Source	Radu Mihăileanu	Leïla Bekhti, Hafsia Herzi	Drama	Belgian-Italian-Moroccan-French co-production
Le Tableau	Jean-François Laguionie	Jessica Monceau	Family	Animated French–Japanese co-production
Tales of the Night	Michel Ocelot		Animated film	Compilation movie of Dragons et princesses
Tinker Tailor Soldier Spy	Tomas Alfredson	Gary Oldman, Colin Firth, Tom Hardy, Mark Strong	Spy	French–German–British co-production
Titeuf	Zep		Comedy	Animated film
Tomboy	Céline Sciamma	Zoé Héran, Malonn Lévana, Jeanne Disson	Drama	
Tous les soleils	Philippe Claudel	Stefano Accorsi, Neri Marcorè, Lisa Cipriani	Comedy	
Tu Seras Mon Fils	Gilles Legrand	Niels Arestrup, Lorànt Deutsch	Drama	
Voir la mer	Patrice Leconte	Nicolas Giraud, Clément Sibony, Pauline Lefèvre, Gilles Cohen	Comedy drama	
The Women on the 6th Floor	Philippe le Guay	Fabrice Luchini, Sandrine Kiberlain, Natalia Verbeke	Comedy	

== See also ==
- 2011 in France
- 2011 in French television
- List of 2011 box office number-one films in France
