= Titeuf (TV series) =

Animated television series

Titeuf is a Franco-Swiss animated television series, adapted from the eponymous Swiss comic strip Titeuf by Zep, broadcast in France between April 4, 2001 and October 3, 2017 on France 3 and Canal J. It was also broadcast on Les Minikeums, TO3, France Truc,, Ludo, Okoo on France 4, Canal+ Kids, Télétoon+, Bangoo and on ADN.

A film inspired by the series, Titeuf, was also released on April 6, 2011.

== Synopsis ==
The series tells the story of the daily life of Titeuf, a ten-year-old boy with a distinctive blond tuft of hair, his friends, and their view of the adult world. Much of the discussion revolves around the mysteries of girls, life, seduction, and Nadia, the girl Titeuf is in love with. Another characteristic of Titeuf is his many catchphrases (such as "Tchô!" and "C'est pô juste!").

== Distribution ==
- Donald Reignoux: Titeuf and Hugo
- Sabrina Leurquin: Manu, Valérie (as Dumbo), Nathalie, (1st voice, seasons 1–3)
- Kaycie Chase : Ramatou, Valérie (as Dumbo) (2nd voice, à partir de la saison 4)
- François, Jean-Claude, Ludo, Pépé, Jean-Do, Le Grand Myope
- David Garcia: Thérèse, Maxime
- Roger (Titeuf's Dad), Hervé (Vominator), Pierre-Alexandre (as Puduk), Diego, Tim, Marco, Horace (as Morvax), Ramon, Basil
- Nadia (1st voice), Susie (as Zizie), Ze t'aime, Julie, (seasons 1–3)
- Pauline Brunner: Nadia (2nd voice, from season 4)
- Anne-Mathilde (Titeuf's Mom), Aunt Monica, Josiane Biglon (the teacher), (1st voice, seasons 1-2)
- Nathalie Homs: Manu, Susie (as Zizie), Lucie, the Nurse (2nd voice, season 4), Anne-Mathilde (Titeuf's mom), Aunt Monica, Josiane Biglon (teacher) (2nd voice, seasons 3–4)
- Record Studio: Karina Films (seasons 1–3) and Piste Rouge (saison 4)
- Art director: Pierre Valmy (seasons 1–3) and Anne Giraud (saison 4)

== Production ==
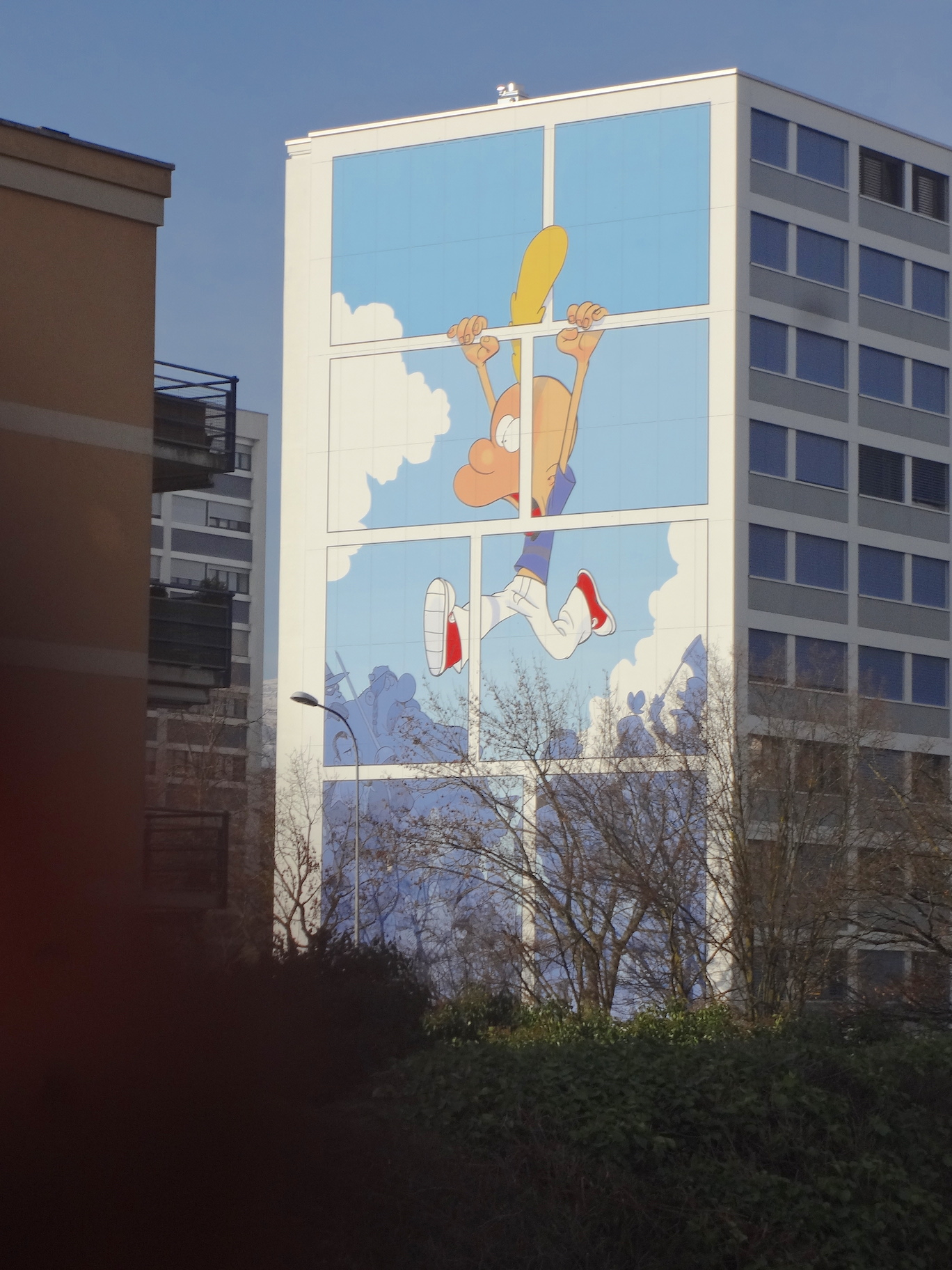
Mural of Titeuf

The animated Titeuf episodes draws its inspiration and origins from the comic book series of the same name, created by the Swiss author Zep. It was originally directed by Daniel Duda, by Prakash Topsy for the second season, and by Olivier Bonnet for the third season. The series was produced by MoonScoop Studios and runs for three seasons, the first of which comprises 78 episodes, in 2003. The first opening theme was composed by Terry J. Neale and Rick Mulhal, and published by FA Musique. The theme music for the third season, performed by Matthieu Chedid, was initially featured in the PlayStation 2 game Titeuf: Méga-Compet', released on September 24, 2004. The series also helps to popularize the comics.

The series differs from the comic strip.

The series' large audience led to plans to create a film. Almost nine years after the series first aired, a film titled Titeuf, the Movie was in development. In an interview with the newspaper Sud Ouest in early 2011, Zep discussed the challenges of the project. Subsequently, a fourth season was produced by David Garcia at GO-N Productions, also producers of the animated series Lou!.

The animated series was dubbed into English and aired on GMTV's Toonattik in the UK, Kabillion in the US, KBC Channel 1 in Kenya, TVB Pearl in Hong Kong and Cartoon Network in the United Kingdom and ABC in Australia.
