= Franky Snow =

French comic series

Publication information
- Publisher: Glénat Editions
- Publication date: January 1999

Creative team
- Written by: Éric Buche

Franky Snow is the hero and title of a comic book series created by Éric Buche in 1999. He appeared regularly in the monthly magazine Tchô! edited by Glénat. In 2021, the series has a total of thirteen volumes.

== Synopsis ==
Franky Snow is a humorous comic strip about sports, which recounts the adventures of Franky Snow and his band of friends, all passionate about Boardsports: surfing, skateboarding, snowboarding, rollerblading, extreme mountain biking, freestyle skiing, BMX, etc. The comic strip is distinguished by its realistic representation of the culture of skateboarding. For example, it faithfully reproduces, the clothing styles of skating, and skateboarding terminology.

== History ==
In 2020, the coronavirus pandemic, brings together all the cartoons, including those of Zep (Titeuf) and Buche (Franky Snow), intended to raise morale at the height of the health crisis, hosts several posters to recall the elementary gestures to live together without putting one's health at risk. That same year, Éric Buche was announced at the Mummie children's bookstore in Grenoble for a signing session for Franky Snow.

== Characters ==
- Franky Snow: hero of the series, wearing a small blue wick cut. Gifted for skateboarding, snowboarding, surfing and rollerblading, he is very optimistic and especially a kicker, he is madly in love with Adrenaline and is ready to do anything for her, which very often pushes him to make stupid mistakes but assisted by his two best friends, they will have to live crazy adventures. His favorite color is blue.
- Ben/Benoît: Franky's sidekick. Obese and mocking, he is good at cycling and with which he can perform tricks. He has two rabbit teeth in the middle and is constantly dressed in a cap and jacket in the colors of the Chicago Bulls. His favorite color is red. In the cartoon, he loves pies.
- Zechariah/Zack: Franky's sidekick. The biggest (and most beautiful) of the group. An inveterate dragger, he specializes in rollerblading and is constantly dressed all yellow even in his cap except shoes and gloves; his favorite color is therefore yellow. In the cartoon, he is shown particularly clumsy.
- Adrenaline: Franky's secret crush. She loves everything about novelties and fashion or even doing a lot of shopping and dreams of being a Hollywood star. She is also very manipulative and she also loves Franky deep down.
- Auntie: Franky's great-aunt whom she finds too stubborn and irresponsible. Despite this, she has a lot of attention to him even despite his old age. In the cartoon, she is called "Granny"; it is his grandmother who still has a great physical appearance and good intelligence.
- Dagobert: Franky's Auntie dog. Granny in the cartoon, where he is endowed with astonishing intelligence and bravery, he showed himself gifted for dance. Despite the hairy strands that cover his eyes, he is very vicious).
- Julie: Zack's girlfriend, who is very jealous and, therefore, will have a lot to do, his beloved "Zackounet" is not always very faithful.
- Moby: a friend he met during a failed surfing date. It is very trendy technologies: mobiles (hence its nickname), consoles, music; he constantly wears green glasses, and often large headphones also green, like his favorite color.
- Grinepisse/Piste verte: Franky's eco-friendly friend whose idea of preserving world peace and rescuing endangered animals is far too annoying.
- Kevin: Skateboard salesman in the Hotspot store. He is bigleux and he hates to make credit in his merchandise even in case of danger except once because of Franky.
- Louise/Loulou: Zack's younger sister (her cousin in the cartoon), she studied abroad and writes a blog. In the cartoon, she has the soul of a tomboy. Still, she loves feminine stuff like shopping or going to the movies. She is in love with Franky and always wants to do everything for him and also to put him back on the right path if possible. She's super nice and she's good at skating.
- Jules (only in the cartoon): Franky's friend and in a disabled condition as a result of a serious skateboarding accident. He wears a yellow cap and loves skateboarding above all else.
- The Mammoths (only in the cartoon): nicknamed by the inhabitants of the neighborhood because of their dominating force and invincible authority. It is about twins: one is named Jean-Pierre and has a blue headdress and a plus mark on his tank top and the other Pierre-Jean who has a purple headdress and a Minus on his tank top. Despite their strength, they are still big morons who love to turn everything upside down above their desire.

== Adaptation ==
An adaptation of the comic book into an animated series by Toon Factory was announced in 2007. For this adaptation, Buche explains that "I began to undertake the long walk, difficult for a producer, to buy the rights, to agree on the adaptation. It is difficult, because there are many barriers to overcome. The first is to make sure with the publisher that he holds the rights to adapt the work. This is called securing the chain of rights. Then, you have to convince the author to adapt his child, and that's not always easy."

The series was broadcast on M6 and Canal J in the show Total BD in 2007. Then on Gulli and Gulli Africa. It has been available on the ADN platform since July 28, 2021.
