= Karl Sarafidis =

French philosopher (born 1979)

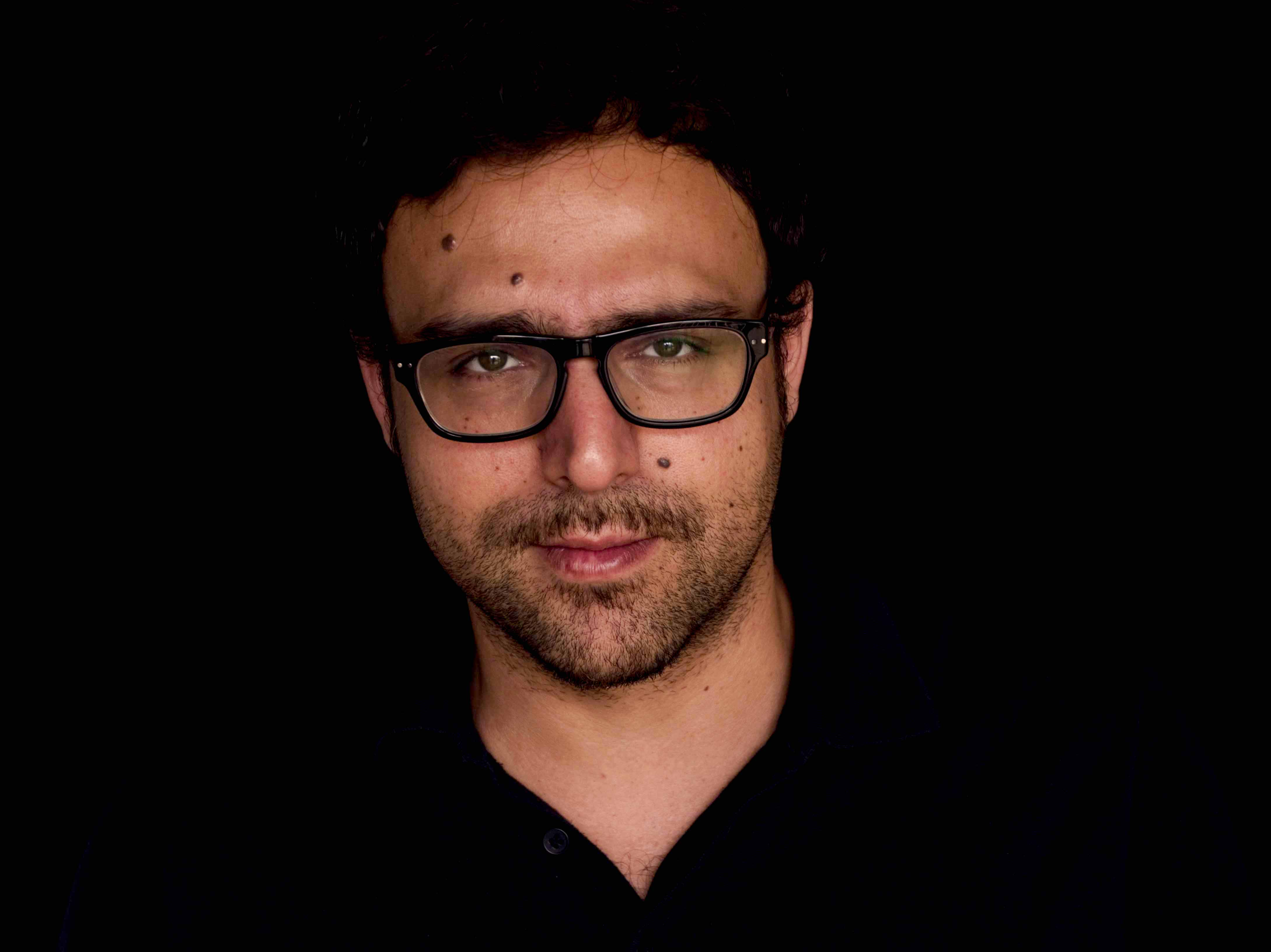
- Sarafidis in 2013
- Born: 6 March 1979 (age 46); Beirut, Lebanon
- Occupations: Philosopher and actor
- Website: www.sarafidis.wordpress.com

Karl Sarafidis, is a French philosopher of Greek and Lebanese origin. Doctor in philosophy, holder of the Agrégation, he taught at Paris-East Créteil University, Paris 1 Panthéon-Sorbonne University and at the French University College (Moscow State University-Lomonosov). Specialist in contemporary philosophy, his thesis topic was on the resumption of metaphysics in Heidegger's and Bergson's thought. In 2013, he published Bergson. La création de soi par soi, in which he attempted to pull out from Bergson's work an ethical program based on the creation of self by self. He is also known for having shared the play in Bruno Dumont's film, Hadewijch and for having subsequently played some roles in French auteur cinema but also in the ethnofiction Samira by the ethnographer and filmmaker Nicola Mai. Karl Sarafidis has also contributed to the script for Dumont's film by writing Nassir's lesson on Al-Ghaib.

== Bibliography ==
- "Rire, sentir, penser", in Affect et affectivité dans la philosophie contemporaine et la phénoménologie. Affekt und Affektivität in der neuzeitlichen Philosophie und der Phänomenologie, Éliane Escoubas & Laszlo Tengelyi, editors, Paris, L'Harmattan, « Ouverture philosophique », 2008 (ISBN 978-2-296-05332-8).
- "Les deux sources de l'émotion et du logique", in La logique des émotions, E. Cassan, J.-M. Chevalier & R. Zaborowski, editors, Warsaw, Éditions scientifiques de Pologne, Organon, 36, 2008 (ISSN 0078-6500).
- "La rêverie de Bergson. Métaphysique et spiritisme", in Sciences et Fictions, Nice, Alliage, 65, 2009 (ISBN 978-2913312210).
- "Dessine-moi une aire de jeux", Lausanne, Espazium, Tracés, 20, 2011.
- Bergson. La création de soi par soi, Paris, Eyrolles, 2013 (ISBN 978-2212554755).
- "Le monde de la perception", in La perception, entre cognition et esthétique, A. Bruzan, J.-M. Chevalier, R. Mocan, R. Vicovanu, editors, Paris, Garnier, « Classiques », 2016 (ISBN 978-2812461149).
- "Cosmopolitique de la laideur", Paris, Presses Universitaires de France, Nouvelle Revue d'esthétique, 18, 2016 (ISBN 978-2-13-079251-2).
- "Projeter un futur ordinaire", interview with Konstantin Gudkov, Lausanne, Espazium, Tracés, 3, 2018.
- "Bergson et la phrase intérieure", in L'homme intérieur et son discours. Le dialogue de l'âme avec elle-même, J.-J. Alrivie, editor, Paris, Vrin, Le Cercle Herméneutique, 2018 (ASIN B07KLTV8ZZ).
- "Aidôs", in Presocráticos, A. Ramírez Guijarro, editor, Madrid, Monográfico. Ápeiron. Estudios de filosofía, 2019 (ISBN 978-84-17898-57-1).
- "Hermès ou Mercure ?", in Des réalités intraduisibles. La traduction au prisme des sciences sociales de l'Antiquité à nos jours. Непереводимая реальность? Перевод сквозь призму общественных наук от Античности до наших дней, P.-L. Six & V. Benet, editors, Moscow, ed. Nouveaux Angles, 2019 (ISBN 978-5-6042912-3-8).
- "Plurilingualism of the same", in For Beirut. لبيروت, Zürich, Roten Fabrik, Fabrikzeitung, 361, 2020.

== Filmography ==
- 2009: Hadewijch by Bruno Dumont
- 2011: Beirut Hotel by Danielle Arbid
- 2013: La permission by Joyce A. Nashawati
- 2014: Samira by Nicola Mai
- 2014: A Single Body by Sotiris Dounoukos
- 2014: Nectar by Lucile Hadzihalilovic
- 2016: Orpheline by Arnaud des Pallières
