= Buche =

Buche may refer to:

- Hog maw, or buche, the stomach of a pig prepared as food
- Scheitholt, or bûche, a German stringed instrument
- BuChE or butyrylcholinesterase, an enzyme
- Éric Buche, creator of the comic Franky Snow
