= List of 2011 box office number-one films in France =

This is a list of films which have placed number one at the weekly box office in France during 2011. The weeks start on Wednesdays, and finish on Tuesdays.

†	This implies the highest-grossing movie of the year.

#	Date	Film	Gross	Notes
1	January 5, 2011	La chance de ma vie	$2,862,053	
2	January 12, 2011	Season of the Witch	$2,749,309	Finished at number one, despite being screened in less theaters (325) than The Green Hornet (505) and Le Fils à Jo (450) which released the same week.
3	January 19, 2011	Hereafter	$5,646,551	
4	January 26, 2011	Hereafter	$3,766,585	
5	February 2, 2011	Nothing to Declare	$20,173,011	The movie got a limited release one week prior in Northern France and Belgium. Nothing to Declare was the second widest theatrical release ever on a first week, with 1,036 theaters (only behind Asterix at the Olympic Games, with 1,078 theaters). Nothing to Declare had also the highest-grossing opening week for a comedy in 2011.
6	February 9, 2011	Nothing to Declare	$12,962,281	
7	February 16, 2011	Nothing to Declare	$8,919,672	
8	February 23, 2011	Nothing to Declare	$6,776,038	
9	March 2, 2011	Nothing to Declare	$4,104,529	
10	March 9, 2011	The Rite	$2,905,860	The Rite broke the 5-week number-one streak made by Nothing to Declare.
11	March 16, 2011	Ma part du gâteau	$2,934,147	
12	March 23, 2011	Rango	$4,210,513	
13	March 30, 2011	Rango	$2,685,295	
14	April 6, 2011	Titeuf	$3,070,462	
15	April 13, 2011	Rio	$4,916,976	
16	April 20, 2011	Rio	$4,122,050	This marks the fifth consecutive week where three different animated films were number one at the French box-office.
17	April 27, 2011	Thor	$8,690,043	
18	May 4, 2011	Fast Five	$10,040,137	Fast Five is the highest-grossing film in the series in France, and has the best opening week.
19	May 11, 2011	Fast Five	$5,535,782	
20	May 18, 2011	Pirates of the Caribbean: On Stranger Tides	$16,640,516	This is the lowest opening week for a Pirates of the Caribbean film.
21	May 25, 2011	Pirates of the Caribbean: On Stranger Tides	$8,051,456	
22	June 1, 2011	Pirates of the Caribbean: On Stranger Tides	$8,539,879	
23	June 8, 2011	Pirates of the Caribbean: On Stranger Tides	$5,463,385	
24	June 15, 2011	Kung Fu Panda 2	$8,566,432	Kung Fu Panda 2 opening week was slightly below the first film, Kung Fu Panda, but managed to reach the number one spot, that its predecessor have failed to do.
25	June 22, 2011	Kung Fu Panda 2	$3,835,011	
26	June 29, 2011	Transformers: Dark of the Moon	$11,456,014	Transformers: Dark of the Moon has the highest opening week in the series. It also has the highest-grossing opening week for a science fiction film in 2011.
27	July 6, 2011	Transformers: Dark of the Moon	$5,291,950	
28	July 13, 2011	Harry Potter and the Deathly Hallows – Part 2	$27,591,728	Harry Potter and the Deathly Hallows - Part 2, in terms of tickets sold, made the fourth highest first-day gross of all time in France, and the sixth highest first-week gross of all time in France. However, The Adventures of Tintin made better later in the year for its first week.
29	July 20, 2011	Harry Potter and the Deathly Hallows – Part 2	$12,144,002	
30	July 27, 2011	Cars 2	$8,775,319	Cars 2 made a better opening week than the first episode, Cars five years prior.
31	August 3, 2011	The Smurfs	$6,438,356	
32	August 10, 2011	Rise of the Planet of the Apes	$9,284,285	
33	August 17, 2011	Rise of the Planet of the Apes	$4,362,553	
34	August 24, 2011	Rise of the Planet of the Apes	$3,686,179	
35	August 31, 2011	Final Destination 5	$4,386,871	Final Destination 5 is the first film in the series to reach the number one weekly spot in France, and is the highest-grossing film in the series in France.
36	September 7, 2011	Friends with Benefits	$1,772,869	Friends with Benefits is the lowest-grossing film of 2011 that reached the number one spot in France.
37	September 14, 2011	La Guerre des Boutons	$5,291,941	This movie, and La Nouvelle Guerre des Boutons, were two films loosely based on the famous French novel War of the Buttons, that released a week after another.
38	September 21, 2011	La nouvelle guerre des boutons	$4,090,938	
39	September 28, 2011	La nouvelle guerre des boutons	$2,261,944	
40	October 5, 2011	Bienvenue à bord	$4,164,260	Drive had a much higher average gross per theater.
41	October 12, 2011	The Artist	$3,135,958	
42	October 19, 2011	Polisse	$4,040,667	Polisse was shown in less theaters than Real Steel, which released the same day.
43	October 26, 2011	The Adventures of Tintin: The Secret of the Unicorn	$21,788,886	The Adventures of Tintin, in terms of tickets sold, has the highest-grossing opening week in 2011, and the sixth-highest of all time (taking the Harry Potter and the Deathly Hallows - Part 2 spot). This is also the highest-grossing week of all time for an animated film.
44	November 2, 2011	Intouchables †	$14,725,888	Intouchables broke the record for the highest-grossing revenue per theater of all-time for a wide release.
45	November 9, 2011	Intouchables †	$23,150,820	The movie again broke its own record, set a week prior. The revenue income is 57% higher than in the release week.
46	November 16, 2011	Intouchables †	$17,603,393	Intouchables manages to have a stronger week than The Twilight Saga: Breaking Dawn – Part 1, despite being shown in less theaters and being in its third week. The latter has the highest-grossing opening week that didn't reach the number one spot in 2011.
47	November 23, 2011	Intouchables †	$16,038,772	
48	November 30, 2011	Intouchables †	$14,602,623	Puss in Boots, released on that week, is the highest-grossing film in 2011 in France that didn't reach the weekly number one spot. Intouchables also crosses the $100 million bar on that week, the last film in France having reached that high being Avatar in 2010. It also makes the best fifth week of all time, beating Titanic's record.
49	December 7, 2011	Intouchables †	$9,674,182	Intouchables makes its sixth consecutive week at the French box-office, beating Nothing to Declare's 5-week streak.
50	December 14, 2011	Intouchables †	$6,689,667	Intouchables, even being on its seventh week, still stands at number one, preventing Mission: Impossible – Ghost Protocol from being number one on its opening week.
51	December 21, 2011	Intouchables †	$5,492,523	
52	December 28, 2011	Intouchables †	$8,197,671	

== See also ==
- Lists of highest-grossing films in France
- List of French films of 2011
