= The Empire (film) =

2024 film by Bruno Dumont

- Theatrical release poster
- French: L'Empire
- Directed by: Bruno Dumont
- Written by: Bruno Dumont
- Produced by: Jean Bréhat; Bertrand Faivre
- Starring: Lyna Khoudri; Anamaria Vartolomei; Camille Cottin; Fabrice Luchini
- Cinematography: David Chambille
- Edited by: Bruno Dumont; Desideria Rayner
- Production companies: Tessalit Productions; Red Balloon Film; Ascent Film; Novak Prod; Rosa Filmes; Furyo Films; Shelter Prod; RTBF
- Distributed by: ARP Sélection (France)
- Release dates: 18 February 2024 (Berlin); 21 February 2024 (France)
- Running time: 111 minutes
- Countries: France; Germany; Italy; Belgium; Portugal
- Language: French
- Budget: €7,990,000
- Box office: €693,000 (Note: Estimated on the basis of the number of tickets sold in France)

The Empire (French: L'Empire) is a 2024 apocalyptic science fiction comedy-drama film written and directed by Bruno Dumont. It is a parody of the Star Wars franchise and Hollywood blockbusters in general, set in Dumont's home region of northern France.

The international co-production between France, Germany, Italy, Belgium and Portugal premiered on 18 February 2024 at the 74th Berlin International Film Festival, where it won the Silver Bear Jury Prize. It was theatrically released in France on 21 February 2024.

== Premise ==
"Two opposing forces from the depths of outer space unleash an apocalyptic conflict on Northern France's picturesque Côte d'Opale."

== Cast ==
- Lyna Khoudri as Line
- Anamaria Vartolomei as Jane
- Camille Cottin as The Queen
- Fabrice Luchini as Belzébuth
- Brandon Vlieghe as Jony
- Julien Manier as Rudy
- Bernard Pruvost as Van der Weyden
- Philippe Jore as Carpentier

== Production ==
=== Development and casting ===
In January 2022, Bruno Dumont was announced to be preparing a new film entitled L'Empire, which would feature actresses Virginie Efira and Adèle Haenel. Haenel was described as making "her comeback to the cinema", following a controversy at the 45th César Awards after which she stepped away from film. Lily-Rose Depp and Fabrice Luchini, as well as Bernard Pruvost, Philippe Jore and Julien Manier, were also announced as cast members. The film was teased as a confounding mélange of science fiction and social realism set in Dumont's home region of northern France. Bernard Pruvost once again appears as Commandant Van der Weyden, and Philippe Jore, as Lieutenant Rudy Carpentier, characters who originally appeared in the miniseries P'tit Quinquin (2014), also created by Dumont. At the end of April 2022, Camille Cottin and Anamaria Vartolomei joined the cast. In May 2022, Adèle Haenel left the project due to disagreements with Bruno Dumont over the script, which she characterised as "dark, sexist and racist". In August 2022, Lily-Rose Depp and Virginie Efira were confirmed to have left the project due to "filming having changed dates several times" which ultimately conflicted with their schedules. They were replaced by Lyna Khoudri and Camille Cottin, as well as Anamaria Vartolomei who took the place of Adèle Haenel.

Jean Bréhat and Bertrand Faivre produced The Empire for Tessalit Productions. The film is co-produced by Red Balloon Film (Germany), Ascent Film (Italy), Novak Prod (Belgium), Rosa Filmes (Portugal) and Furyo Films (France).

=== Filming ===
Principal photography began on 16 August 2022 in Wimereux (Pas-de-Calais), located in France's Côte d'Opale region, where the production was set up on the Dunes de la Slack beach, stretching between Pointe aux Oies and Fort d'Ambleteuse. Boulonnais horses and drones were used on this day. Filming, which took place primarily in Audresselles, continued until 10 September. Scenes were also filmed on 13 August on board a boat off the coast of Audresselles. Filming resumed for a few days in late September in Brussels, then from 3 to 10 October in Caserta, with a final shooting day scheduled for October or November in Berlin.

== Release ==
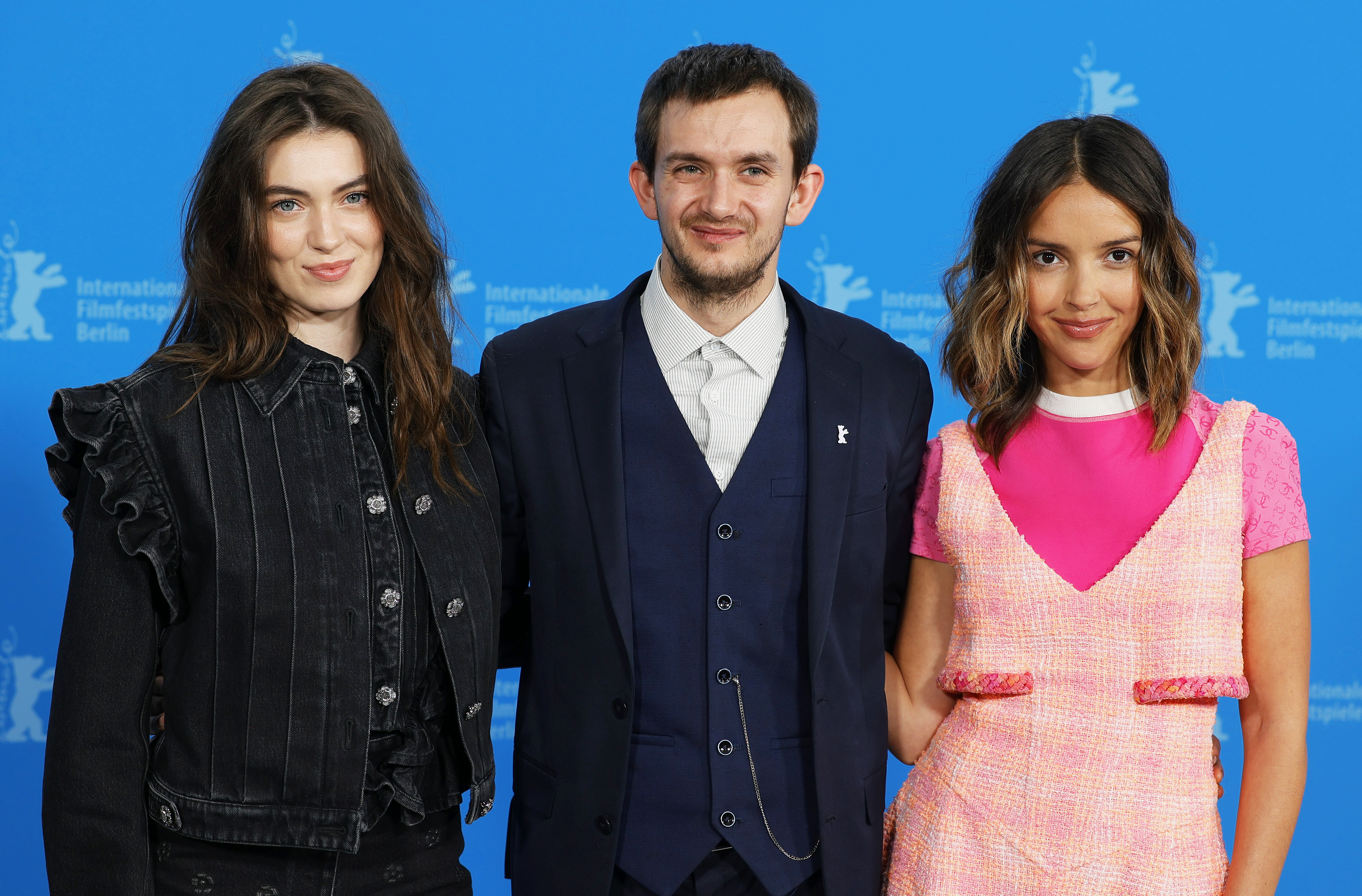
Anamaria Vartolomei, Brandon Vlieghe and Lyna Khoudri at Berlinale 2024

The Empire premiered on 18 February 2024 at the 74th Berlin International Film Festival, where the film was selected in the main competition for the Golden Bear.

ARP Sélection distributed the film in France on 21 February 2024. World sales are handled by Memento International, who presented the film for sale at the Marché du Film of Cannes in May 2023. In March 2024, it was announced that the film had been acquired by Kino Lorber for North America, with a theatrical release set for later in 2024.

== Reception ==
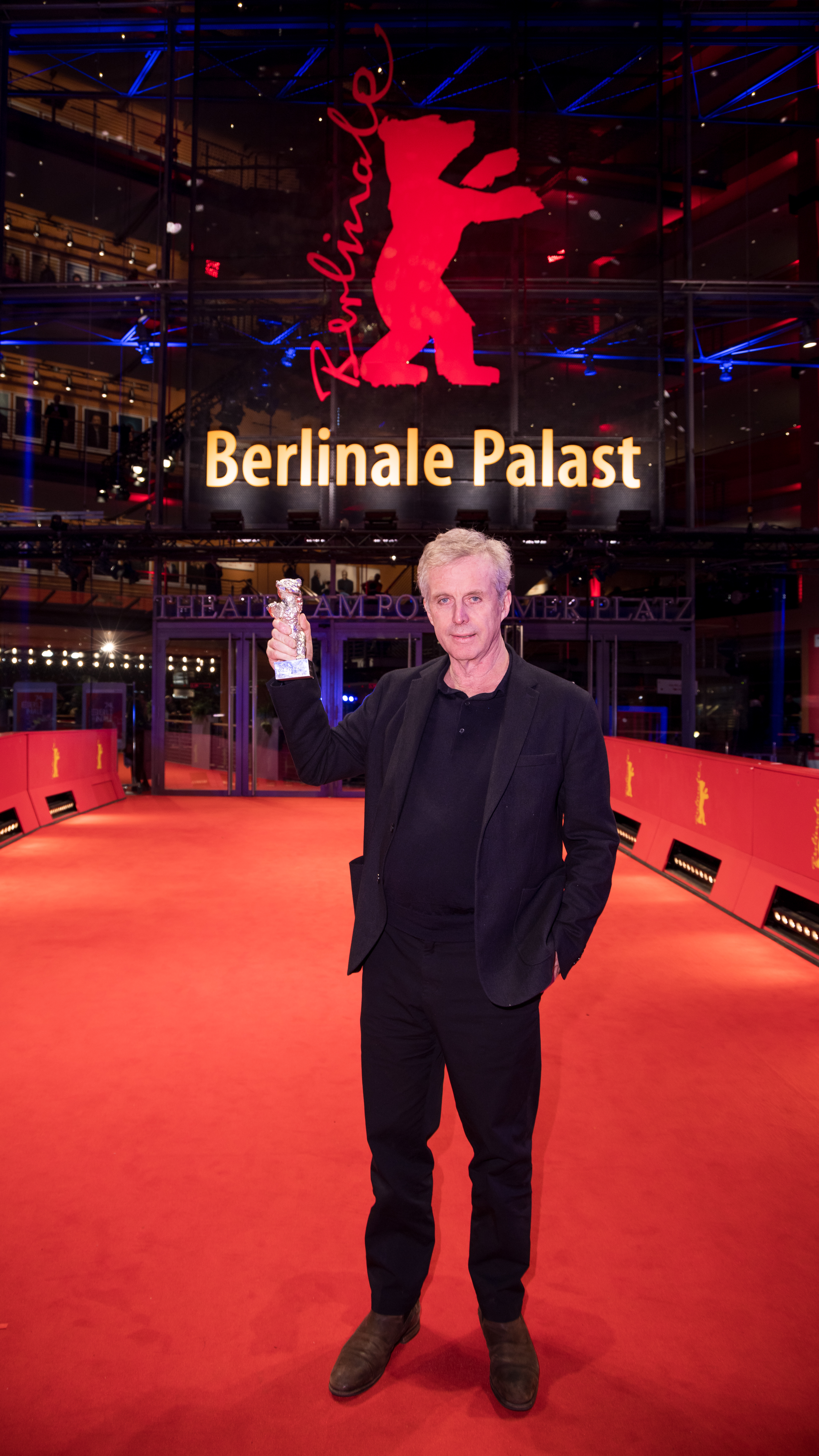
Bruno Dumont with the Berlinale Jury Prize

=== Critical response ===
On the review aggregator website Rotten Tomatoes, 62% of 13 critics' reviews are positive, with an average rating of 5.2/10. Metacritic, which uses a weighted average, assigned the film a score of 53 out of 100, based on 4 critics, indicating "mixed or average" reviews. On AlloCiné, the film received an average rating of 3.6 out of 5 stars, based on 24 reviews from French critics.

Richard Brody of The New Yorker wrote that the film was "as outrageous and uproarious as it is visionary" and listed it as one of the best films of 2025.

=== Accolades ===
Award	Date of ceremony	Category	Recipient(s)	Result	Ref.
Berlin International Film Festival	25 February 2024	Golden Bear	Bruno Dumont	Nominated	
Berlin International Film Festival	25 February 2024	Silver Bear Jury Prize	Bruno Dumont	Won	
Gijón International Film Festival	23 November 2024	Albar Competition – Best Feature Film	Bruno Dumont	Nominated	
