= Red Rocks (film) =

2026 film by Bruno Dumont

- French: Les Roches Rouges
- Directed by: Bruno Dumont
- Written by: Bruno Dumont
- Produced by: Joaquim Saphinho; Marta Alves; Fiorella Moretti; Carole Lambert; Marc Missonnier
- Starring: Kaylon Lancel; Kelsie Verdeilles; Louise Podolski; Mohamed Coly; Alessandro Piquera; Meryl Pires
- Cinematography: Carlos Alfonso Corral
- Edited by: Bruno Dumont
- Music by: Laia Torrents Carulla
- Production companies: Tessalit Productions; Rosa Filmes; Pulpa Film; Nightswim; Andergraun Films; Novak Prod
- Distributed by: Les Films du Losange (France)
- Release dates: 20 May 2026 (Cannes); 23 September 2026 (France)
- Running time: 91 minutes
- Countries: France; Belgium; Italy; Portugal; Spain
- Language: French

Red Rocks (French: Les Roches Rouges) is a 2026 coming-of-age docudrama film written, edited and directed by Bruno Dumont. It follows five-year-old Geo (Kaylon Lancel) and his group of friends scrambling over the red rocks of the French Riviera and swimming in the Mediterranean.

The film had its world premiere at the Directors' Fortnight section of the 2026 Cannes Film Festival on 20 May. It will be released theatrically in France by Les Films du Losange on 23 September.

== Cast ==
- Kaylon Lancel as Géo
- Kelsie Verdeilles as Eve
- Louise Podolski as Manon
- Mohamed Coly as Rouben
- Alessandro Piquera as B
- Meryl Pires as Do

== Production ==
The film was shot in Provence-Alpes-Côte d'Azur and Friuli-Venezia Giulia. Shot with non-professional infant actors, the film adopts a quasi-documentary approach.

== Release ==
The film had its world premiere at the Directors' Fortnight section of the 2026 Cannes Film Festival on 20 May, alongside a masterclass by the filmmaker. It will have its North American premiere at the Currents section of the 2026 New York Film Festival.

It will be released theatrically in France by Les Films du Losange on 23 September. Luxbox will handle international sales.

The film had its UK release on 31 October at the 2026 Leeds International Film Festival.
