= Pigeon Boy =

- Genre: Action-adventure; Superhero; Comedy
- Created by: Jean de Loriol
- Developed by: Jean de Loriol; Philippe Guinet; Marion Aguesse
- Directed by: Claude Allix
- Voices of: French: François Jérôme; Laura Préjean; Donald Reignoux; Hervé Rey; Brigitte Virtudès; English: Rick Adams; Maria Darling; Lewis Macleod; Bob Saker; Marc Silk; Jane Whittenshaw (Note: Credited as "Jane Wittenshaw".)
- Composers: Eric Allouche; Franck Lebon
- Country of origin: France
- Original languages: French; English
- No. of episodes: 26

Production
- Executive producers: Roch Lener; Jonathan Peel
- Animators: Borisfen-Lutece; Studio Dacodac (Note: Credited as "Dacodac".); Millitoon; Taner Film (Note: Credited as "Taner".)
- Editors: Thibaud Caquot; Mathieu Duboscq
- Running time: approx. 26 min.
- Production company: Millimages

Original release
- Network: France 3 (France Truc) (Note: The block was named T O 3 until August 2004.) (France)
- Release: 24 January 2004 – 2 January 2005
- Network: ABC-TV (ABC Kids) (Australia)
- Release: 10 May – 1 October 2004

Pigeon Boy is a children's animated television series co-produced by Millimages and France 3. Comprising 26 episodes, the series has been broadcast on a number of television networks, including the ABC-TV programming block ABC Kids in Australia. It is set in the fictional city of Ultrapolis and centres on the lives of three teenagers: Randolf and his two friends, Arthur and Chloe.

== Plot ==
The series centers on Randolf (nicknamed "Randy"; French: Rodolphe), a 14- or 15-year-old boy who is transformed into the comical hero Pigeon Boy by the city's pigeon population. Operating unnoticed, the pigeons spy on the residents of Ultrapolis and summon Pigeon Boy whenever trouble arises. While Randy's best friends, Arthur and Chloe, are aware of his secret identity, they actively conceal this knowledge from him. Randy has vowed that if anyone discovers his secret, he will abandon his heroic persona and never save the city again.

== Characters ==
=== Main ===
- Randolf "Randy" Dove (French: Rodolphe) / Pigeon Boy (voiced by Rick Adams; François Jérôme in the French version) – A 14- or 15-year-old boy who is secretly summoned by the city's pigeons to become the comical hero Pigeon Boy.
- Arthur (voiced by Rick Adams; Donald Reignoux in the French version) – One of Randy's best friends; he secretly knows Randy's heroic identity but keeps it to himself.
- Chloe (voiced by Maria Darling; Laura Préjean in the French version) – One of Randy's best friends; like Arthur, she is aware of his secret identity but actively conceals it.

=== Recurring ===
- Bruiser Glibstone (voiced by Rick Adams) – The bully at Randy's school and the son of Victor Glibstone.
- Victor Glibstone (voiced by Rick Adams) - Bruiser's father.
- Henry Dove (voiced by Rick Adams; Hervé Rey in the French version) – Randy's father, who works as a lawyer.
- Mrs. Dove (voiced by Maria Darling; Brigitte Virtudès in the French version) – Randy's mother, who works as a doctor.
- Granny Greenly (voiced by Maria Darling) – Chloe's grandmother.
- Lilly (voiced by Jane Whittenshaw) – Arthur's mother.

== Episodes ==
| No. | Title | Written by | Original release date | Australian air date |
|---|---|---|---|---|
| 1 | "The Oil Slick" "Marée noire" | Frédéric Louf (Note: Credited as "Fred Louf".) | 27 March 2004 | 10 May 2004 |
The rich oil baron, Victor Glibstone, is plotting to sink one of his tankers and claim the insurance money. He has ordered his henchmen to take the captain and crew of the tanker prisoner and steer the ship towards the nearest reef. When the harbour master realises what is going on he tries to alert the authorities but nobody takes him seriously. Pigeon Boy is called upon to convince Victor of the error of his ways and avert a serious environmental crisis.
| 2 | "Don't Play with Your Food" "Faut pas jouer avec la nourriture" | Frédéric Louf | 29 May 2004 | 11 May 2004 |
Mr Duggins, owner of Arch Supermarkets and Duggins Deliveries, has engineered a new way of maximising profit and cutting down on wasted food. Meat past its sell by date is sprayed with a product making it smell like fresh meat again. The doctored meat is then sold in the supermarket and delivered to canteens around the city. There are increasing numbers of food poisoning and the pigeons are getting worried. Pigeon Boy is needed urgently! The superhero is captured and only narrowly avoids becoming pigeon mince before convincing Mr Duggins to apologise to his customers for the poor quality of the meat recently and to guarantee much better quality control in the future.
| 3 | "Ruffled Feathers" "Doudoune story" | Claire Paoletti | 24 January 2004 | 12 May 2004 (Note: The episode premiered on 26 April 2004 as a sneak peek.) |
A serious cold spell has descended, causing endless problems. It hasn't stopped snowing for days; the streets are like ice skating rinks; icicles are hanging from every gutter; pipes are freezing up. There is panic at the supermarket as desperate mothers rush for the last remaining warm feather jackets for their frozen children. Mr Bowens, the proprietor assures his customers that there will be a delivery of down jackets no later than the next day. What a strange coincidence then that the pigeons are witness to a bizarre kidnapping at a bird shop. Masked men remove the birds and take them to a farm where it looks like Mr Bowens himself is preparing for an imminent mass plucking. For this he has a formidable looking machine endowed with gleaming tweezers. The pigeons are terrified and summon Pigeon Boy to save the birds and convince Mr Bowens to give every child a free down jacket to protect them from the cold.
| 4 | "The Cards Are Stacked…" "Bonne pioche" | Frédéric Louf and Pierre Olivier | 1 May 2004 | 13 May 2004 |
Scaramon Land is running a competition- any child that finds a Pukuyu card in their pack will win a trip to Scaramon Land. Goth has the sole rights to sell Scaramon cards in Ultrapolis, and is relentlessly promoting the competition. In a warehouse on the edge of the city, his assistant has been instructed to remove all the Pukuyu cards from every pack before it goes on sale, so no child has any chance of winning. The children are all very excited and can't wait until the cards go on sale later that afternoon. The pigeons call on Pigeon Boy. Pigeon Boy foils Goth's plot and makes him agree to give away the doctored packs of cards to the children for free.
| 5 | "Tears of a Puppet" "Bye bye Guignol" | Patrick Regnard | 12 June 2004 | 14 May 2004 |
John Sloop is fed up of being distracted from his bowling games by children in the park. When he finds the deeds to some land in his attic he is overjoyed, he will be able to build himself a bowling green of his own, even if the land currently houses the ever popular puppet theatre that is about to celebrate its 40th anniversary. John Sloop orders the puppeteers off the land. They are confused, and produce a document, signed by John's father, allowing them to use the land for as long as they so wish. John is furious, and threatens legal action. He employs Henry Dove, Randy's father, to represent him. The pigeons are worried and put Pigeon Boy on the case. Will he be able to change John's mind?
| 6 | "The Evergreens" "La quenotte" | Claude Scasso | 22 May 2004 | 17 May 2004 |
Arthur and Chloe are at a press conference where Drak announces that the last retirement home in the city, the Evergreens, is to be demolished to make way for a new car park. It is clear that the residents are far from pleased about being moved from their homes. One old lady, Lucy, hides as the coach takes the residents away. She refuses to be parted from the tomb of her dead dog Foxy. She shows Arthur and Chloe the huge bone her clever dog dug up in the grounds of the home. The builders have moved in, Pigeon Boy and Lucy are doing their utmost to stop the demolition and protect Foxy's tomb. The bone turns out to be the thigh bone of an extremely rare dinosaur never before seen in Ultrapolis. Drak is forced to abandon the demolition when two complete skeletons are unearthed. He announces that the Evergreens retirement home will not be moved after all, but the ground floor of it will be turned into a dinosaur museum.
| 7 | "Life is a Game of Football" "La balle au bond" | Frédéric Louf | 26 June 2004 | 18 May 2004 |
There is much speculation as to why Daniel Streatham, Ultrapolis Football Club's star player, is playing so badly. The manager, Terry Peebles, is secretly doping his lucky yoghurt before the match. Terry is being paid by other managers to lose matches. He also blackmails Drak into using money that has been set aside for the high school refurbishment to buy a new centre forward for the team, as the current one is so useless. Pigeon Boy investigates. He finds out about the tranquilisers in the yoghurt as well as the match fixing and exposes Terry in front of the whole football team. Terry announces that he will not be signing a new centre forward and will be coaching the Ultrapolis Football Club for free for the next 3 years. He also offers to fund the high school refurbishment.
| 8 | "The Eviction of Fred Winter" "L'éviction d'Alfred de Winter" | Fred Coloso and Pascal Perry | 20 March 2004 | 19 May 2004 |
After 30 years of perfect forecasting, veteran meteorologist Fred Winter is replaced by the inexperienced Honey Adams just days before the city’s massive "Ultrapicnic." As Fred leaves, he intercepts an urgent warning: a tornado is set to strike during the event. Bitter over his dismissal, Fred initially hides the report from Honey, falsely assuring her the weather will be perfect. While a young hero named Pigeon Boy fails to convince the public of the coming danger, Fred suffers a change of heart. Realizing he cannot let the citizens of Ultrapolis perish, he rushes back to the station. Despite a technical failure, Pigeon Boy repairs the antenna just in time for Fred to broadcast a life-saving warning. Recognizing that expertise outweighs aesthetics, the station bosses fire Honey and reinstate Fred as their lead forecaster.
| 9 | "What a Load of Rubbish!" "Règlement de compte à la décharge" | TBA | 14 February 2004 | 20 May 2004 |
Drak's nephew Kevin has been thrown out of the navy. Drak's wife begs him to give him a job in the city. Drak relents and finds Kevin a job as a street cleaner, driving a brand new state of the art street sweeper. Unfortunately Kevin takes his job a bit too literally: he uses the powerful water jets to blast all the rubbish off the streets and in to people's gardens. He chops off all the tree branches to stop them dropping their leaves on the streets and making a mess. He even starts a clean up operation of the pigeons – capturing as many of them as he can. Pigeon Boy is called upon to rescue the captured birds and protect the species from future attacks. After a long battle with Kevin, Pigeon Boy manages to convince him to give up his street cleaning job. Drak is horrified when he discovers what his nephew has been up to and finds him a new job: keeping the municipal roses bug free!
| 10 | "The Golden Wiper (Note: Also known as "A Close Scrape".)" "La raclette d'or" | Fred Coloso and Pascal Perry | 3 April 2004 | 21 May 2004 |
The annual Golden Wiper competition pits Arthur’s aunt Rita, the two-time defending champion, against the ruthless Cosmo Peterson, owner of "Squirt o’ Sun." Desperate to win, Cosmo ignores the fact that his product causes hair loss—instead buying wig factories to profit from the side effect. The final challenge is to clean one side of Peterson Tower. Cosmo attempts to cheat by entering a "two-man" team with arms in plaster to appear disadvantaged, only for them to reveal healthy limbs once they reach the top. However, his plan backfires; "Squirt o’ Sun" leaves greasy streaks on the glass, possibly due to interference from Pigeon Boy. Despite Cosmo’s dirty tactics, Rita’s skill prevails. She claims her third consecutive trophy, and the public rejects Cosmo’s flawed product in favor of Rita’s own brand.
| 11 | "White Christmas" "Noël blanc" | TBA | 21 February 2004 | 24 May 2004 |
The annual Christmas Gala concert in aid of local children is approaching. TV viewers are asked to vote for their favourite artist to perform at the concert. The competition is between Lynda Lyonne, an older singer, and Christina Crest, the current teen singing sensation. Christina wins the TV vote hands down. After the live show, Christina is mobbed by her fans, while nobody pays any attention to Lynda as she leaves the studio. Lynda is furious and is determined to perform at the gala concert. She devises an evil plan to temporarily rid Christina of her voice. Unfortunately every attempt she makes to sabotage her rival's voice is thwarted by Pigeon Boy.
| 12 | "A Seedy Affair" "Graine de voyou" | Claire Paoletti | 10 April 2004 | 25 May 2004 |
Casper Grainger, CEO of Genetox, tasks his scientists with creating a grain to end world hunger. The result is a disaster: a genetically modified seed that causes instant obesity and intense addiction. While Casper promises to destroy the crop, he secretly floods the market, selling it as cheap birdseed and baking it into "irresistible" cookies. Chaos grips Ultrapolis. Addicted birds and desperate pet owners swarm stores, while the city stands on the brink of a food-driven epidemic. Meanwhile, Randy faces a crisis. He cannot transform into Pigeon Boy because his feathered allies have abandoned him, lured away by the grain. Randy eventually finds them gorging themselves at the Genetox warehouse. With Casper poised to launch his addictive cookies to the masses, Randy must break the birds' trance and reclaim his powers. Can Pigeon Boy stop Casper’s corporate greed before Ultrapolis is hooked forever?
| 13 | "Clowning Around" "Le clown Zigota" | Antonin Poirée and Mathilde Maraninchi | 31 December 2004 (Note: Aired on DR1 in Denmark on 26 November 2004.) | 26 May 2004 |
The famous singer Marietta is in Ultrapolis to host a charity auction of celebrity items. The most talked about lot is a stunning red dress she wore at her last concert. Marietta's biggest fan, Charlie Black the clown, is also in town, touring with the circus. He wants the dress for himself and is prepared to go to any lengths to ensure he gets it. Chaos breaks out when it is discovered that the dress has been stolen from Marietta's hotel room. Pigeon Boy is quickly on the case and ensures that the dress is returned before the auction the following day, only narrowly avoiding being signed up to the circus in the process!
| 14 | "Love for Sale" "Cœur à prendre" | TBA | 1 January 2005 | 27 May 2004 |
The well-known couple, Marlon Landau and Pamela Booster have just gone through a high profile divorce. The media coverage is huge; they have broken up because Pamela has embarked on a high profile affair with the up and coming young actor, Adam Chalmers. Marlon publicly announces that he is on the lookout for love. Middle aged women across Ultrapolis are prepared to endure anything to achieve the svelte figure Marlon is renowned to favour. Pigeon Boy must try and use all his cunning (with a little help from Arthur and Chloe) to try and get Marlon and Pamela back together before the female population resort to drastic measures in the vain hope of capturing Marlon's heart.
| 15 | "Milo's Venus" "La Vénus de Milo" | Claire Paoletti | 31 January 2004 | 28 May 2004 |
Michael Milo, the museum curator, is very excited about his latest acquisition for the museum: the Venus Calypso, a priceless sculpture. He is so besotted with the statue that he has even taken to sleeping next to it in the museum. His wife is beside herself, she has had enough of her husband and his brief flirtations with works of art! She arranges for the statue to "disappear". But even the best laid plans can go wrong... as the museum is burgled and Pigeon Boy is kidnapped in the process. Will he free himself in time to stop the statue being destroyed for ever?
| 16 | "Pigeon of Paradise" "Le pigeon du paradis" | Claude Scasso | 15 May 2004 | 31 May 2004 |
Honey Adams is singing the lead in a new musical at the Paradise Theatre. Things keep going wrong at rehearsals, could it be the work of the infamous ghost, said to live in one of the boxes at the theatre? The story goes that he can only be appeased with gifts of food before every performance, only the director of this show, Archie Rivers, has refused to submit to such blackmail. Lena is one of the backing singers and has a far better voice than Honey. She signs a contract to be the lead voice in the musical, unaware that she will only be the voice; Honey will be miming to it on stage. Pigeon Boy and the ghost come up with a plan that exposes Honey for the fraud she really is and lets Lena take centre stage where she belongs.
| 17 | "The Glitter Boyz" "Les paillettes boyz" | Sylvie Chanteux | 7 February 2004 | 1 June 2004 |
A corny dance troupe of ex-fishermen, the Glitter Boyz, is rehearsing for their forthcoming show. One of them, Bob, is fired for always being late. He decides to do anything he can to stop the show going ahead; especially as his mother is going to be in the audience and he hasn't told her he is not longer one of the Boyz. Bob sabotages the equipment in the gym and fiddles with the brakes on the Glitter Boyz' coach. Randy is hired as a replacement for Bob; he is very reluctant to take part, as his mother will be in the audience too! Bob realises the error of his ways and does his best to avert a major accident, luckily Pigeon Boy is in the vicinity to give him a helping hand.
| 18 | "Gorilla Warfare" "Gare au gorille" | Frédéric Louf and Pierre Olivier | 8 May 2004 | 2 June 2004 |
Professor Firble has a novel approach to running the Ultrapolis zoo, he ensures all the animals feel useful, giving them each a little job to do and letting them roam free when the zoo is closed. This prevents them getting bored and suppresses their natural aggression. Unfortunately, Cosmo Peterson, the zoo owner, has decided to transform the zoo into a theme park, Savageland, full of wild and ferocious animals. Professor Firble refuses to treat the animals in such a fashion, so Cosmo employs an ex-marine, Alfred Pusey, in his stead. Can Pigeon Boy and Professor Firble convince Cosmo Peterson to leave the zoo as it is?
| 19 | "The Fires of Passion" "Tout feu tout flamme" | Patrick Regnard | 19 June 2004 | 3 June 2004 |
Frankie, a young poetic fireman, is in love with Annabelle, the daughter of Basil the fire station chief. They are planning to marry but her father will not allow it. He does not think Frankie is man enough for his daughter. Basil accuses Frankie of burning down the merry-go-round in the park to prove that he is not fit to marry Annabelle. Frankie goes in to hiding. Basil sets a trap for him as he plots to burn down the school and frame Frankie for the fire. But with Pigeon Boy's help, Frankie proves to Basil that he not a coward and is more than fit to marry his daughter after all.
| 20 | "Woof Woof" "Ouah ouah" | Claire Paoletti | 28 February 2004 | 4 June 2004 |
Erica Trowers is a talented high school student who has designed a robotic pet dog. She shows the toy to Honey Adams who passes the design off as her own to her boss, Archie Rivers. Archie loves the little dog and decides to make it the TV station's mascot – giving these away is bound to boost their ratings. Honey has managed to get her hands on all the plans for the toy so poor Erica has no way of proving she really did invent the little robotic dog. The pigeons call on Pigeon Boy to ensure Erica gets the recognition she so rightly deserves.
| 21 | "The Noise and the Fury" "De bruit et de fureur" | Fred Coloso and Pascal Perry | 24 April 2004 | 7 June 2004 |
Gregory Plaint is protesting about the level of noise and pollution from the new runway at the nearby Peterson Air airfield. All the other residents in the quiet suburb have moved away and their houses have been demolished, but Gregory stubbornly refuses to move, he does not want to leave the home he was born in. The protest gains media interest, especially when Cosmo Peterson, the airline owner, wins a court case granting him the right to evict Gregory and demolish the house. Pigeon Boy soon discovers that there is more to this long running dispute than meets the eye...
| 22 | "Rough Love" "Raide love" | Fred Coloso and Pascal Perry | 6 March 2004 | 8 June 2004 |
One of the classrooms at the high school has been vandalised. Lena's band, the Screeching Vampires, has been accused of the attack as they were the only people known to have been on the premises at the time as they were rehearsing for their forthcoming gig. Randy has also been blamed as he was watching the rehearsals. The pigeons summon Pigeon Boy to prove that the Screeching Vampires are innocent by finding out who the real culprits are and exposing them.
| 23 | "Open Season" "La chasse est ouverte" | Claire Paoletti | 17 April 2004 | 9 June 2004 |
Somebody has employed several men to hunt down as many Bronze Sphinx butterflies, a protected species by law, as they can. When they are arrested, the men admit that they are following the orders of Eva Glibstone, the oil baron's wife. Drak, the mayor of Ultrapolis calls the police station and demands that the men be set free without charge and left to continue with their business. Arthur's aunt Rita, the environmental assistant for the city, is furious when she finds out and accuses Drak of bowing down to powerful business men. It is not long before Pigeon Boy is on the case, stopping the butterfly hunt, and unearthing the strange reason behind Eva's behaviour.
| 24 | "Eternal Youth" "Éternelle jeunesse" | Frédéric Louf | 13 March 2004 | 10 June 2004 |
Chloe's grandmother is the newest resident of the Eternal Youth retirement home, one that promises to revitalise the older generation. She is extremely surprised when she is immediately put to work sewing tablecloths etc but when Mrs Bernadette, the proprietor, tells her that not only do they help underprivileged children with their charity work, but keeping busy will keep senility at bay, she readily agrees. She is shocked when she discovers that they are expected to work 8 hours a day without a break. The residents are not allowed to make phone calls or receive visitors and their post is censored. The poor old woman is unable to leave as there are no spaces in any of the other retirement homes and she doesn't want to be a burden on her family. The pigeons call on Pigeon Boy to stop the residents of the Eternal Youth being exploited so ruthlessly by Mrs Bernadette who is selling all the goods on at a huge profit.
| 25 | "One Dreadful Night…" "Nuit d'enfer" | Fred Coloso and Pascal Perry | 5 June 2004 | 11 June 2004 |
Cosmo Peterson has been awarded the coveted title Citizen of Honour of Ultrapolis. Cosmo is worried when he discovers that there will be an exhibition detailing his life in the town hall. There are some aspects of his past he has gone to great pains to cover up and he really doesn't want them to be made public knowledge now he is an important and respected business man. He employs a couple of hoodlums to ensure this information stays hidden; unfortunately they come up with some interesting, and dangerous, plans to destroy the offending artefacts. Pigeon Boy is quickly called to the scene to ensure that justice is done and the minimal amount of damage is caused.
| 26 | "Pigeon Quiz" | Frédéric Louf | 2 January 2005 | 1 October 2004 |
Randy and Lena have reached the finals of the TV game show "Who Knows Wins". They are busy trying to learn as much as they can before the big day. Bruiser, the school bully, decides to enter the competition too, just to spite them. Unfortunately he is less than blessed in the brains department and persuades his father, Victor Glibstone, to use his considerable influence and money to enter him into the final and obtain the answers to the questions before the show – there's no way he can lose now! Pigeon Boy is called to the scene to convince the TV station boss to change the questions and ensure that the most honest contestants win...

== Release ==
=== Broadcast ===
Pigeon Boy originally premiered in France on France 3 from 24 January 2004 to 2 January 2005, where it aired as part of the channel's youth programming blocks. The series achieved international distribution through Millimages, airing in Australia on the ABC-TV programming block ABC Kids from 10 May to 1 October 2004 (with a sneak peek previewing on 26 April 2004) and in the Middle East on MBC 3. In North America, the series was picked up for streaming by Toon Goggles.

=== Home media ===
The series never received a complete retail home video release. A partial physical release occurred in Australia, where the first four episodes were compiled and released on a standalone DVD.
