= David Dewaele =

French actor

David Dewaele (born 19 March 1976 in Hazebrouck, Nord-Pas-de-Calais as David Sébastien Dewaele; died 27 February 2013 in Hazebrouck) was a French actor.

== Life and career ==
In 2006 he met director Bruno Dumont, who engaged him for his movie Flanders. Dumont worked with Dewaele again in 2009 for his drama Hadewijch. In 2011 Dumont gave Dewaele his first lead role in his movie Outside Satan, in which Dewaele played the outsider Le Gars. The film was praised by critics of The New York Times and The Guardian.

On 27 February 2013 David Dewaele died in his hometown after suffering a stroke.

== Filmography ==
- 2006: Flanders (Flandres)
- 2009: Hadewijch
- 2011: Outside Satan (Hors Satan)
