= Hors Satan =

2011 film by Bruno Dumont

- Film poster
- Directed by: Bruno Dumont
- Written by: Bruno Dumont
- Produced by: Jean Brehat; Rachid Bouchareb; Muriel Merlin
- Starring: David Dewaele; Alexandra Lematre
- Cinematography: Yves Cape
- Edited by: Buno Dumont; Basile Belkhiri
- Production company: 3B Productions
- Distributed by: Pyramide Distribution
- Release dates: 16 May 2011 (Cannes); 19 October 2011 (France)
- Running time: 110 minutes
- Country: France
- Language: French

Hors Satan (Outside Satan) is a 2011 French drama film written and directed by Bruno Dumont. It was filmed under the production title L'Empire, which means "The Empire". It premiered in the Un Certain Regard section at the 2011 Cannes Film Festival.

== Cast ==
- David Dewaele as le gars
- Alexandra Lematre as la fille
- Valerie Mestdagh as la mère
- Sonia Barthelemy as la mère de la gamine
- Juliette Bacquet as la gamine
- Christophe Bon as le garde
- Dominique Caffier as l'homme au chien
- Aurore Broutin as la routarde

== Reception ==
Rob Nelson of Variety called Hors Satan "Another 'WTF?' film from Gallic writer-director Bruno Dumont", and went on: "Like Dumont's Twentynine Palms and Life of Jesus (give or take the Cannes Grand Prix-winning L'Humanité), Outside Satan flirts with all-out absurdity, as if managing to keep it at bay will be the director's own miracle, highly subject to interpretation. Less debatable are the film's technical merits, with d.p. Yves Cape delivering naturalistic beauty on a wide canvas, and the on-location sound work capturing every minute nuance of bird-chirps, cock-crows, and blasts of both wind and, uh, shotgun."

British film critic Peter Bradshaw of The Guardian gave the film 4 out of 5 stars, saying that "Bruno Dumont's film-making is just so fluent, unnerving, gripping; he is entirely unique". Lisa Schwarzbaum of Entertainment Weekly granted the film a B+ and called it an "austerely wild, religiously amoral drama... set in untamed northern coastal France," adding, "Dumont's rigorous, serious attention to the mysteries of good, evil, and faith rewards those willing to be confounded."
