= Captain Biceps =

- Genre: Action; Comedy
- Created by: Fredric "Tebo" Thebault; Philippe "Zep" Chappuis
- Directed by: Pascal Davis
- Country of origin: France
- Original languages: French; English
- No. of seasons: 1
- No. of episodes: 78

Production
- Executive producer: Philippe Delarue
- Running time: 21 minutes (7 minutes per segment)
- Production company: Futurikon

Original release
- Network: France 3
- Release: 8 November 2010 – 11 March 2011

Captain Biceps is a French-Swiss animated series based on the comics by Frederic Thebault and Philippe "Zep" Chappuis, available in 78 episodes of 8 minutes each (but has also been broadcast in 26 episodes of 24 minutes, by joining 3 separate episodes into one).

The series is about the muscular fighting superhero, Captain Biceps, assisted by his faithful and more intelligent companion, Genius, facing the villains to save Capital City from disaster.

The series first aired on January 2, 2010 on France 3 in France. It also aired on Starz Kids & Family in the United States.

== Characters ==
- Captain Biceps - Captain Biceps has fists like steel. OK, for sure, he is really just a big kid. And it's true, he gets jealous: No one had better contradict him, or try and be more clever… 'cos he's the Hero! But we will forgive these minor shortcomings. Because Captain Biceps is also courageous, determined and generous. Because in the end, it is that little spark of goofiness is the strongest! His sidekick Genius boy knows a thing or two about that! However, that makes him so unique, plus… you know… His crazy ideas always lead him to victory!
- Genius - Genius is Captain Biceps faithful sidekick. He has a fine sense of organization: He prepares their missions like nobody else and he knows exactly what's going on. But his rather school- like answers to the problem are never quite as efficient as those of his boss. Genius Boy is both appalled by his boss's stupidity and always mystified by his unorthodox methods, which he has to admit, are pretty darn efficient. Even though he never reaps the recognition he deserves (Captain Biceps will never ever admit that his sidekick might be smart have come up with a good idea), Genius Boy remains Captain Biceps' faithful and devoted assistant.
- The President - Suit and tie, a big cigar in his mouth and his faithful mutt at his feet… Meet the President. Most of the time he is hanging ten: In his office doing a crossword puzzle, having diner in a fancy restaurant, relaxing in his massive Turkish bath… When suddenly, he is interrupted by the announcement that some serious threat looms over Capitalcity, or even worse, the entire planet. So he picks up his phone and calls Captain Biceps.
- Carmina Cantaloup - A big brassy mother, Carmina has her son wrapped around her fat little finger. And though he is 100% superhero, he has to: Brush his teeth before going to bed, always finish his spinach and Brussels Sprouts, pick up his dirty socks and so forth. Even though Carmina grumbles about the fact that he is still living at home (one of her ritual complaints), deep down, she is quite happy he is here! The Captain complains sometimes, but not too much and not too loudly. He doesn't want to get her angry. After all, your mom is your mom and Captain Biceps loves his big momma.
