= Hadewijch (film) =

2009 film by Bruno Dumont

- Theatrical release poster
- Directed by: Bruno Dumont
- Written by: Bruno Dumont
- Produced by: Rachid Bouchareb; Muriel Merlin
- Starring: Julie Sokolowski; Karl Sarafidis; Yassine Salim
- Cinematography: Yves Cape
- Edited by: Guy Lecorne
- Music by: Richard Cuvillier
- Production company: 3B Productions
- Distributed by: Tadrart Films
- Release dates: 11 September 2009 (Toronto Film Festival); 25 November 2009 (France)
- Running time: 105 minutes
- Country: France
- Language: French
- Budget: € 3.4 million
- Box office: $62,468

Hadewijch is a 2009 French film directed by Bruno Dumont that, in the person of a troubled teenage girl, explores conflicting interpretations of Catholicism and Islam. It won the International Film Critics' award at the 2009 Toronto International Film Festival.

== Plot ==
Hadewijch, preparing to be a nun in a Catholic convent, is sent home because her excessive devotion and asceticism are judged to be dangerous. Back with her wealthy parents in Paris as their daughter Céline, she signs on for a course in theology. In a café, she falls into conversation with Yassine, a young man from the outskirts with little education and no job. He accepts that she wants no physical love, because she belongs to Jesus, and takes her to meet his older brother Nassir, who gives lectures on Qu'ranic theology. Nassir convinces her that God demands not just devotion and asceticism, but also action against injustice in the world. He takes her to an Arabic-speaking country, where she is enrolled in a jihadist movement, and the two then return to Paris to explode a bomb by the Arc de Triomphe. Back at the convent, Hadewijch finds the absence of Jesus unbearable and, when police come to question her, throws herself into a pond. A rescuer arrives in the person of a young workman just out of jail.

== Scholarly and critical reception ==
Critics have noted the influence of Robert Bresson and Mathieu Kassovitz. Bruno Dumont has remarked that the comparisons between his work and Robert Bresson are often exaggerated.

== Cast ==
- Julie Sokolowski as Soeur Hadewijch/Céline
- Yassine Salim as Yassine
- Karl Sarafidis as Nassir
- David Dewaele as David
- Brigitte Mayeux-Clergot as Mother Superior
- Luc-François Bouyssonie as Céline's father
- Marie Castelaine as Céline's mother
