= P'tit Quinquin (film) =

P'tit Quinquin (Li'l Quinquin)
- French poster
- Directed by: Bruno Dumont
- Written by: Bruno Dumont
- Produced by: Rachid Bouchareb; Jean Bréhat; Muriel Merlin
- Starring: Alane Delhaye; Lucy Caron; Bernard Pruvost; Philippe Jore
- Cinematography: Guillaume Deffontaines
- Edited by: Bruno Dumont; Basile Belkhiri
- Distributed by: Arte Diffusion
- Release date: 21 May 2014 (Cannes)
- Running time: 206 minutes
- Country: France
- Language: French

P'tit Quinquin (released as Li'l Quinquin in the U.S. only) is a 2014 French murder mystery film/miniseries directed by Bruno Dumont. Originally premiering as a film at the 2014 Cannes Film Festival in May (and subsequently for international releases), it was broadcast in September 2014 as a four-episode miniseries on French television.

A sequel, Coincoin and the Extra-Humans (Coincoin et les Z’inhumains), was made by Dumont in 2018, featuring most of the cast of the original film.

== Cast ==
- Alane Delhaye as "P'tit Quinquin"
- Lucy Caron as Eve Terrier
- Bernard Pruvost as Roger Van der Weyden
- Philippe Jore as Rudy Carpentier
- Philippe Peuvion as Quinquin's father, Mr Lebleu
- Céline Sauvage as Quinquin's mother
- Jason Cirot as Dany Lebleu
- Lisa Hartmann as Aurélie Terrier
- Julien Bodard as Kevin
- Corentin Carpentier as Jordan
- Baptiste Anquez as Mohamed Bhiri
- Pascal Fresch as Mr Campin

Most of the cast was made up of natives of the Pas-de-Calais region, where the film is set, with little to no prior acting experience. Several of the cast members also have physical disabilities, such as Jason Cirot, who plays Quinquin's uncle Dany, or Bernard Pruvost, who has a tic disorder. Dumont responded to criticism that he was exploiting or ridiculing such individuals: "They're acting. We spent a lot of time rehearsing, and it's actor's work." A repeating gag where Dany spins around before falling was suggested by Cirot: "Let's put this in, it's something I love doing." According to Dumont, Pruvost's tics were more pronounced on-screen than off, due to a combination of nervousness and the use of an earpiece through which Pruvost received his lines: "The reason he keeps moving his head is because he's listening to what I'm saying in his ear."

== Accolades ==
Cahiers du Cinéma featured P'tit Quinquin on its cover of the September issue and ranked it as the best picture on its list of films from 2014. In 2019, the magazine placed the film at #3 on its top 10 films of the decade.
