= Glénat Éditions =

French publishing company

Glénat Éditions SA
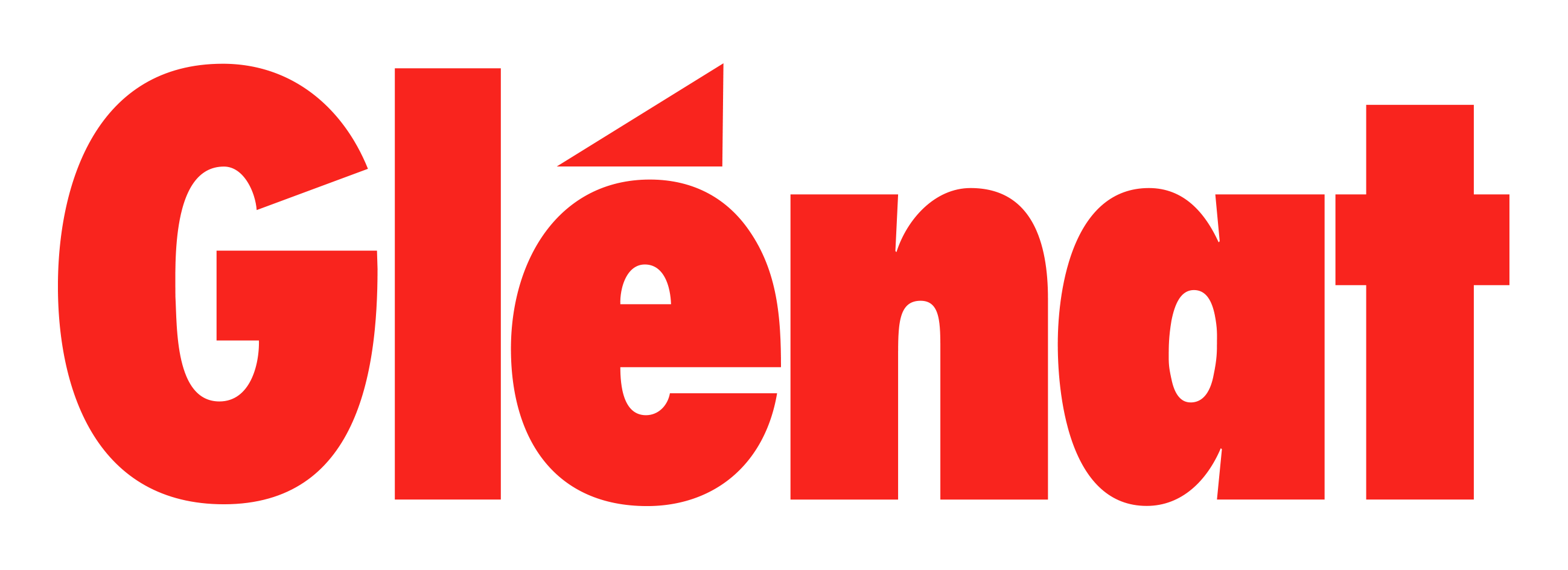
- Founded: 1972
- Founder: Jacques Glénat
- Country of origin: France
- Headquarters location: Grenoble, France
- Distribution: France, Benelux
- Publication types: Comics and graphic novels
- Official website: www.glenat.com

Glénat Éditions SA (French: [ɡlena edisjɔ̃]) is a French publisher with its head office in Grenoble. Their products include comic albums and manga in France, Benelux, and in the past Spain; it was founded by Jacques Glénat. The Benelux subsidiary, Glénat Benelux N.V., is located in Brussels, Belgium. The Switzerland subsidiary, Glénat Éditions (Suisse) SA, has its headquarters in Nyon. The Spanish subsidiary had its head office in Barcelona.

== History ==
Jacques Glénat started his comics fanzine Schtroumpf (the French, original, title of The Smurfs) in 1969, when he was still a student. In 1972, only twenty years old, he established his own publishing house, Glénat. The first two books were by Claude Serre and by Claire Bretécher. Two years later, he already received the award for best publisher at the Angoulême International Comics Festival. To support the rapid growth, the company opened warehouses in Orly near Paris, and a flagship store in Paris.

A new comics magazine, Circus, first appeared in 1975 and existed until 1989. But the next few years saw Glénat move more away from the traditional juvenile Franco-Belgian comics and more towards the graphic novel, with an emphasis on their successful historical series by François Bourgeon and André Juillard. A second magazine, Vécu, dedicated to historical comics, was created in 1985 and survived until 2004.

From 1980 on, Glénat also published non-fiction books related to mountain climbing and to the sea. They also bought the publisher Vents d'Ouest and from 1991 on started publishing manga. But the biggest success of all came with Titeuf by Zep, which soon was one of the bestselling French comic series, with its own magazine Tchô and animated series.

On 5 October 2011, yielded 100% of the capital of Glénat España to Joan Navarro and Félix Sabaté, the two heads of the former subsidiary.

== Company ==
As of 2009, the company gets 50% of its turnover from comics, 20% from manga, and 15% from books, with the last 15% divided over smaller products.

The book division has a catalogue of over 4,000 titles, publishing some 400 new books and 12 million volumes a year. Bestselling series include Titeuf, with 16 million copies, and Dragon Ball, with 17 million copies. It is the second largest comics publishing group in France, behind Média-Participations, with some 20% of the market.

The company has two international subsidiaries, Glénat Benelux and Glénat Suisse (Switzerland). The company is also very active in Canada and collaborates with other publishers in other countries. Apart from translating and distributing the original Glénat productions, these regional companies also produce their own content and specializations. Glénat Benelux has 13% of the market of Belgian comic shops.

=== Head office ===
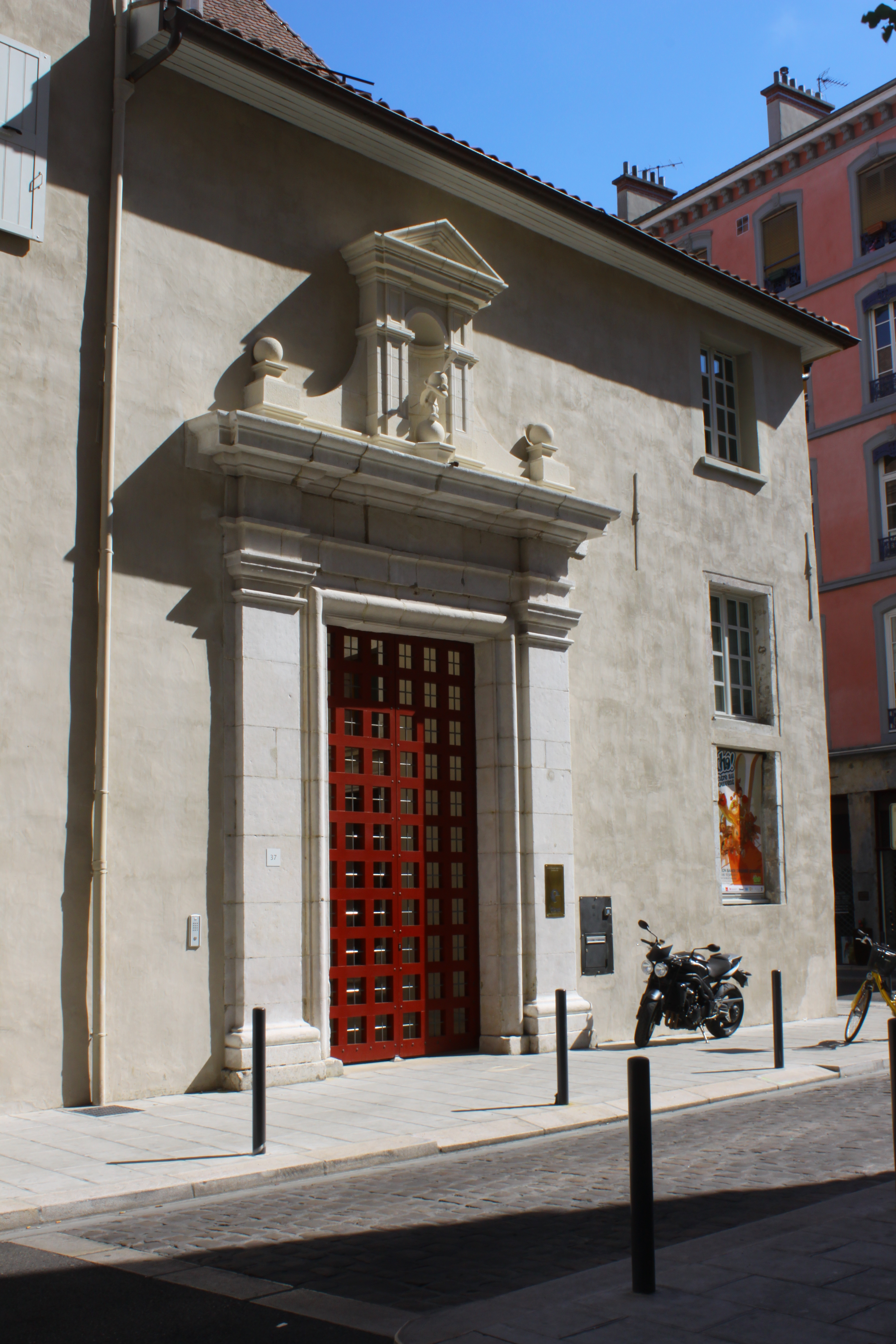
HQ of Glénat in Grenoble

The company head office is in central Grenoble, in the former Convent of St. Cecilia, a 17th-century building which previously hosted a theater. Jacques Glénat had the building restored so it could become the headquarters of the company. The building's restoration took five years to complete. 100 employees work in the building. The building's archives, library, and private collection are open to the public.

== Awards ==
- 1974: Best French Publisher at the Angoulême International Comics Festival, France

== Gallery ==
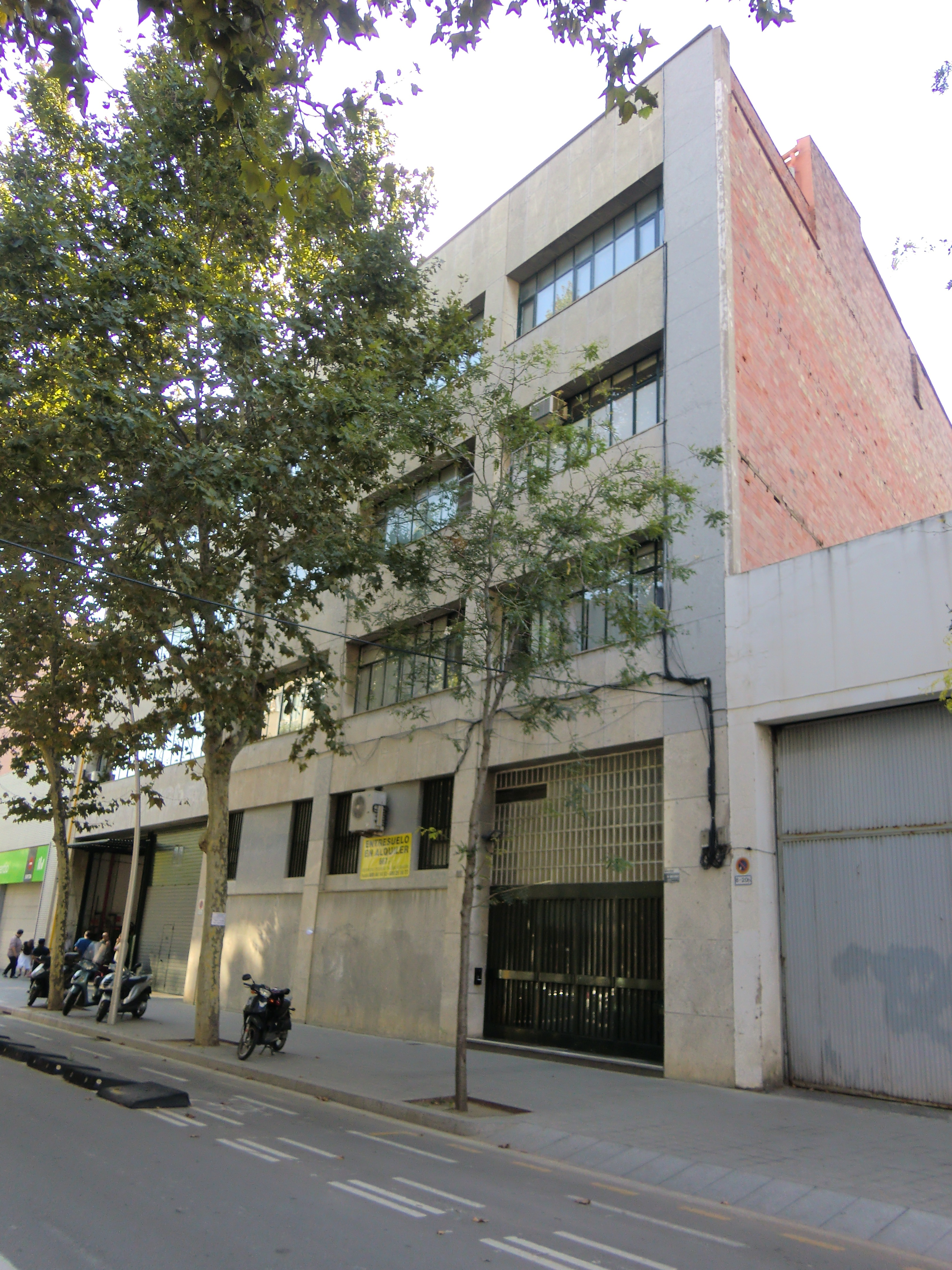
Head office of the Spanish subsidiary
