= The Life of Jesus (film) =

- Directed by: Bruno Dumont
- Written by: Bruno Dumont
- Produced by: Jean Bréhat; Rachid Bouchareb
- Starring: David Douche
- Cinematography: Philippe Van Leeuw
- Edited by: Yves Deschamps; Guy Lecorne
- Music by: Richard Cuvillier
- Distributed by: Tadrart Films
- Release date: May 1997; (Cannes Film Festival)
- Running time: 96 minutes
- Country: France
- Language: French

The Life of Jesus (French: La Vie de Jésus) is a 1997 feature film directed by director Bruno Dumont in his debut. It was the winner of the BFI Sutherland Trophy, the Prix Jean Vigo and European Discovery of the Year at the European Film Awards, as well as the special mention for Camera d’Or at Cannes. Set in the town of Bailleul, the film casts a bleak look at the life of an unemployed teenager with learning difficulties who descends into rape and murder. The choice of title for the film is unexplained.

== Plot ==
Freddy is an unemployed epileptic youth, living with his mother who runs a little bar and sleeping when he can with his girlfriend Marie, who works in a supermarket. When not attending hospital he hangs around with four unemployed boys (the sixth member of the gang is in hospital dying of AIDS). The five are members of an all-male marching band that has an all-female majorettes section and, after a rehearsal, they gang rape one of the girls. Her father publicly denounces them as cowardly rapists. Marie, disgusted at Freddy's behaviour, accepts the advances of Kader, from a North African family. The five abduct Kader, and Freddy kicks him to death. The police inspector denounces him as a cowardly racist murderer.

== Production ==
Director Bruno Dumont confirmed that porn actors were used in the unsimulated sex scene between Freddy's and Marie's characters. "The main actors were replaced by body doubles. I did not like it, towards them. If they had accepted, I would have do. Today, I wouldn't. In all my other films, everything is fake, it's cinema," he said.

== Reception ==
Review aggregator Rotten Tomatoes reports an approval rating of 63% based on 8 reviews with an average score of 6.2/10. On Metacritic, the film has a weighted average score of 74 out of 100, indicating "generally favorable reviews". Lisa Nesselson of Variety wrote "An uncompromising portrait of thwarted emotions and small-town tedium, "The Life of Jesus" is a luminous and disconcerting feature debut from scripter-helmer Bruno Dumont. Pic's deliberate pace, as it details the actions of adolescents with stifled inner lives, poses a commercial obstacle in markets unfriendly to leisurely fare, but film holds definite rewards for patient viewers and fest auds."

== Awards ==
The film received a special mention for the Caméra d'Or at the 1997 Cannes Film Festival, and won the Prix Jean Vigo and the European Discovery of the Year award at the European Film Awards.

== Home video releases ==
- La vie de Jésus - Director-approved Masters of Cinema Series edition - Released in the UK 21 July 2008
- La vie de Jésus - Director-approved special edition in Blu-Ray and DVD formats, released by the Criterion Collection in 2019.
