= Donald Reignoux =

French actor (born 1982)

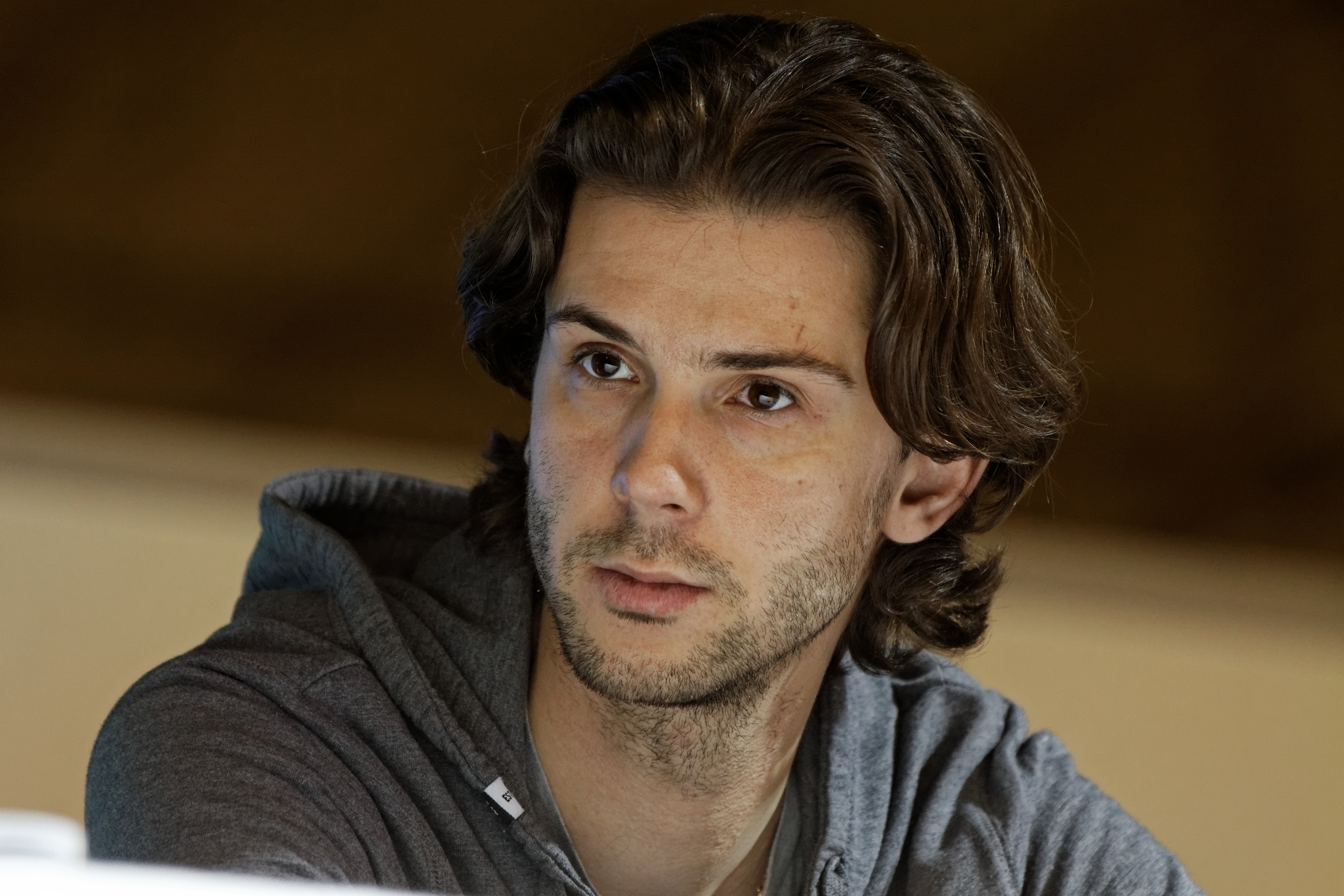
- Born: 20 May 1982 (age 44); Courbevoie, Île-de-France, France
- Occupation: Actor

Donald Reignoux (born 20 May 1982) is a French actor best known for his dubbing and radio roles. He is known for dubbing Spider-Man in The Amazing Spider-Man, The Amazing Spider-Man 2 and the video game Spider-Man (2018). He is also known for dubbing Jesse Eisenberg in The Social Network and some DCEU films, like Batman v Superman: Dawn of Justice, Justice League, and Zack Snyder's Justice League.

Donald Reignoux, according to his Copains d'avant profile, studied at Turpault school at Bois-d'Arcy between the years 1988 and 1993, then he studied in the Mozart school in the same city between 1994 and 1996.

== Voice acting ==
Reignoux started voice acting at the age of ten, in 1992, spotted by the actress and singer Claude Lombard. He stated that he has been voice acting in TV movies for three to four years before beginning voice acting regularly at the age of 16.

Between 1998 and 2000, Reignoux voiced T.J. Detweiler in Recess and Tai Kamiya in the first two seasons of Digimon Adventure. From 1998 to 2016, he voiced Shinji Ikari, a character in Neon Genesis Evangelion.

In 2001, he becomes the voices of Titeuf and Hugo in the series of the same name.

In 2010, Reignoux voiced the protagonist Hiccup in the animated film How to Train Your Dragon.

== Filmography ==
=== Television animation ===
- The Adventures of Jimmy Neutron, Boy Genius (Carl Wheezer)
- All Hail King Julien (Mort)
- The Amazing Spiez! (Lee)
- American Dragon: Jake Long (Brad Morton)
- As Told by Ginger (Blake Gripling)
- Batman: The Brave and the Bold (Green Arrow)
- Ben 10: Alien Force (Kevin Levin)
- Blaze and the Monster Machines (Blaze)
- Codename: Kids Next Door (Numbuh 4)
- Danny Phantom (Danny Fenton)
- Digimon (Tai Kamiya, Wormmon)
- DuckTales (Louie)
- The Fairly OddParents (Elmer)
- Futurama (Cubert)
- Legion of Super Heroes (Brainiac 5)
- Lilo & Stitch: The Series (Keoni Jameson)
- The Magic School Bus (Carlos)
- Martin Mystery (Marvin)
- Mr. Baby (Rudy a.k.a. Ludo)
- My Dad the Rock Star (Buzz Sawchuck)
- Neon Genesis Evangelion (Shinji Ikari)
- The Neverending Story (Bastian Balthazar Bux)
- PAW Patrol (Francois, Jake)
- The Penguins of Madagascar (Mort)
- Phineas and Ferb (Phineas Flynn)
- Pigeon Boy (Arthur)
- Quack Pack (Louie)
- Recess (T.J. Detweiler)
- Rocket Power (Otto Rocket)
- Scissor Seven (Michelangelo Qiang)
- Skyland (Mahad)
- Titeuf (Titeuf)
- Totally Spies! (Arnold)
- Young Justice (Robin)

=== Film ===
- The Super Mario Bros. Movie (Kamek)
- Anastasia (Young Dimitri)
- Cars (D.J.)
- Hoodwinked (Twitchy)
- Horton Hears a Who! (Jojo)
- How to Train Your Dragon (Hiccup)
- James and the Giant Peach (James Henry Trotter)
- Meet the Robinsons (Carl)
- My Neighbor Totoro (Kanta Ōgaki)
- Recess: School's Out (T.J. Detweiler)
- Space Chimps (Ham)
- Spirited Away (Haku)
- The Land Before Time 2-5 (Littlefoot)
- Toy Story (Andy Davis)
- The Lorax (The Once-Ler)
- Frozen (Kristoff)
- Wreck-It Ralph (Fix-It Felix Jr.)
- Big Hero 6 (Fred)
- Promare (Lio Fotia)

=== Video games ===
- Cars (D.J.)
- Kingdom Hearts (Sora)
- Kingdom Hearts II (Sora)
- Psychonauts (Razputin)
- Overwatch (Lúcio)
- The Legend of Zelda: Breath of the Wild (Yunobo)
- Detroit: Become Human (Connor)
- Spider-Man (2018) (Spider-Man)
- No Straight Roads (Zuke)
- Tom Clancy's Ghost Recon Wildlands (Weaver)

=== Live action roles ===
- Sleepy Hollow (Masbath)
- Malcolm in the Middle (Reese)
- Even Stevens (Louis Stevens)
- The O.C. (Seth Cohen)
- Agent Cody Banks and Agent Cody Banks 2: Destination London (Cody Banks)
- High School Musical, High School Musical 2 and High School Musical 3 (Ryan Evans)
- Wizards of Waverly Place (Justin Russo)
- The Golden Compass (Pan)
- Never Back Down (Jake Tyler)
- Tropic Thunder (Kevin Sandusky)
- The Social Network (Mark Zuckerberg)
- The Amazing Spider-Man and The Amazing Spider-Man 2 (Spider-Man)
- Interstellar (Adult Tom Cooper)
- Batman v Superman: Dawn of Justice, Justice League and Zack Snyder's Justice League (Lex Luthor)
- Élite (Nano)
- The 100 (Jasper)
- The Umbrella Academy (Klaus)
- One Piece (Helmeppo)
