= Titeuf (film) =

- Theatrical release poster
- Directed by: Zep
- Screenplay by: Zep
- Based on: Titeuf by Zep
- Produced by: Benoît Di Sabatino
- Starring: Donald Reignoux; Jean Rochefort; Zabou Breitman; Mélanie Bernier; Michael Lonsdale; Johnny Hallyday
- Music by: Jean-Jacques Goldman; Nicolas Neidhardt
- Production companies: MoonScoop; Pathé
- Distributed by: Pathé Distribution
- Release date: 6 April 2011
- Running time: 87 minutes
- Countries: France; Switzerland
- Language: French
- Budget: $15 million
- Box office: $13.9 million

Titeuf (French: Titeuf, le film) is a French-Swiss animated comedy film directed by Zep, based on his Titeuf comic books. The film was released on April 6, 2011.

== Cast ==
- Donald Reignoux as Titeuf / Hugo
- Nathalie Homs as Manu / Zizie
- Vincent Ropion as François
- Mélanie Bernier as Nadia
- Maria Pacôme as Grandma
- Jean Rochefort as Grandpa
- Zabou Breitman as Titeuf's mother
- Sam Karmann as Titeuf's father
- Michael Lonsdale as the psychologist
- Johnny Hallyday as the old adventurer on the train

== Release ==
The film premiered in France on 6 April 2011 through Pathé Distribution, who launched it in 622 theatres. It topped the French box-office chart the first week, with a weekend gross of 2,124,514 euro.

== Video game ==
A video game of the same name, consisting of mini-games, was released on March 31, 2011. The game was developed by Tate Interactive and published by Deep Silver for the Nintendo DS, Wii and PC.
