= Titeuf =

Comic book series

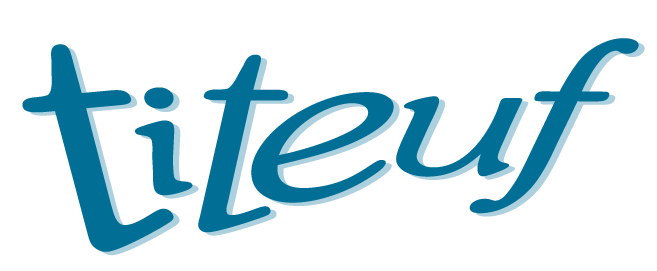
- Official logo
- Author: Zep
- Current status/schedule: Current daily strip
- Launch date: 1992; 34 years ago
- Alternate name: "Tootuff" (English Dandy strips)
- Publisher(s): fanzine Glénat; The Dandy (The UK)
- Genre(s): Comedy, slice of life, blue comedy, toilet humor, satire

Titeuf (known sometimes as Tootuff in English) is a Swiss comic series created by the Swiss comic-book creator Zep in 1992. In 2001 it was adapted into an animated TV series and in 2011 into a film with the same title. The series also appears in the Franco-Belgian comics magazine Tchô!.

== Publication history ==
Titeuf was initially published in the fanzine Sauve qui peut ("Run for your lives") and noticed by Glénat executive Jean-Claude Camano. Zep joined Glénat in 1992 and Titeuf eventually became one of France's most popular comics. The first Titeuf album, Dieu, le sexe et les bretelles (God, Sex, and Suspenders), appeared in 1993 and sold a few thousand copies, but the subsequent books gradually attracted a colossal readership. The series is now considered the highest grossing in the French comics market. Titeuf was adapted into an Italian-French animated TV series in 2001, initially broadcast on Canal J. By 2008, Titeuf was the comic series with by far the largest circulation in France (over 1.8 million copies per year), three times the size of the second most popular series, with it being translated into various languages, such as Spanish, Italian, Russian, and Chinese, among others.

== Characters ==
=== Main ===
- Titeuf: The main character. He is a 10-year-old boy with a blonde cowlick. His best friends are Manu, Hugo, Jean Claude and Vomito. Voiced by Dan Russell.
- Roger: Titeuf and Zizie's father and Anne-Mathilde's husband. He is 49 years old. He often scolds Titeuf and hits him with a branch, club, broom, mallet, hammer or carpet beater. Voiced by Bob Saker.
- Anne-Mathilde: Titeuf and Zizie's mother and Roger's wife. She is 47 years old. She wears a black turtleneck and a pair of tan pants. Voiced by Megg Nicol.
- Zizie: Titeuf's little sister. She first appears in the 7th book. She always cries. She is 1 year old. Voiced by Jules de Jongh.
- Aunt Monique: Titeuf and Zizie's ugly, depressed aunt and Anne Mathilde's sister. She is a blonde-haired woman, and she first appears in the second book. Voiced by Dian Perry.
- Julie: Titeuf and Zizie's female cousin, introduced in the fourth book. Voiced by Jules de Jongh.
- Pépé: Titeuf and Zizie's grandfather and Roger's father. Voiced by Bob Saker.
- Glaïeul: Titeuf and zizie's great uncle and Roger's uncle who uses a wheelchair and tells tall tales. Voiced by Bob Saker.

=== Recurring ===
- Manu: Titeuf's funny best friend from school, he has funny black hair, a big funny, almost unnoticeable nose, and wears glasses. Voiced by Dan Russell.
- Jean-Claude: A boy with a lisp because of his front teeth with braces. He has black hair and big eyebrows. Voiced by Megg Nicol.
- Nadia: Titeuf's crush, but she doesn't like him. She has a ponytail, and has big lips. Voiced by Jules de Jongh.
- Hugo: A stupid bully-idiot and a friend at the same time, he is big, bouncy, and has red hair. He is usually scolded by his father, who is an Italian truck driver. Voiced by Dan Russell.
- François: A boy who also wears glasses, and has a long, pointy nose, reminiscent of Phineas Flynn. He is Titeuf's smart friend. Voiced by Dan Russell.
- Vomito: A redhead who vomits a lot, that's why his name is Vomito. He has a pet hamster named Moulinus. Voiced by Dian Perry.
- Dumbo: Nadia's best friend with pigtails. Voiced by Dian Perry.
- Tim: A black boy who wears a green hoodie. Voiced by Dian Perry.
- Ramatou: A tall and lanky black girl who is Titeuf's new girlfriend, she wears a green cap, and a light blue tank top. Voiced by Jules de Jongh.
- The Mistress: Titeuf’s unnamed elderly teacher, who is very strict. Voiced by Megg Nicol.
- Morvax: A character who always sneezes (morve is French for snot). Voiced by Dan Russell
- Maxime: Titeuf's Muslim friend who is discriminated against by anti-Muslims. He first appears in the eleventh book. He is not allowed to eat pork. His favorite sport is soccer. In a season 4 episode, we learn that his grandfather died. Voiced by Dan Russell.
- Romuald: A 7-year-old who has blue hair and wears glasses. He is the smartest student in Titeuf's school. He is even smarter than François. Voiced by Dian Perry.
- Therese: A stupid girl with pink hair. Voiced by Jules de Jongh.
- Moulinus: Vomito's aggressive hamster.
- Marco: A 13-year-old boy who is the son of a factory worker. He is hypocritical. In one episode, he has a crush on Julie. Voiced by Dan Russell.
- Basil: An autistic boy who speaks weirdly. Titeuf thinks he is an alien. Voiced by Dan Russell.
- The Bosnian Boy: Titeuf teaches him to swear in French and the teacher scolds him.
- Robert: A boy who appears in the fourth book.
- Nathalie: A nerdy girl. Voiced by Megg Nicol.
- Ramone: A Spaniard who is laughed at just because he can't speak proper French. Voiced by Dan Russell
- Élie: A jew who is not allowed to eat pork.
- Samuel: An American boy who is pranked by Titeuf and his friends.
- Milos: A Croatian pacifist.
- Puduk: He is named like that because he farts (pue du cul). Voiced by Dan Russell.
- Ze t'aime: A 6-year-old girl with a mouth that looks like a duck bill, who loves Titeuf, who yells at her and makes her cry. Voiced by Jules de Jongh.
- Big Nearsighted: A thief who steals the phones and the money of the main characters. Voiced by Bob Saker.
- Big Diego: A bully who beats Titeuf up. His plan is thwarted by Vominator's hamster, Moulinus, who bites his foot. He wears green sneakers. Voiced by Bob Saker.
- Musclor: Titeuf's gymnastics teacher. Voiced by Bob Saker.
- Jean Do: Titeuf's art teacher. Voiced by Bob Saker.
- Pauline: A girl who, because of cancer, is bald and is forced to wear a hat. Hugo laughs at her, but Titeuf punches him and defends her, prompting her to kiss him on the cheek.
- Dimi: A Polish boy who can't tie his shoes.
- Krok Lunett: A 4-year-old who annoys everyone.
- Simon: Hugo's brutish, older brother who usually is shown swearing.
- Léo: Titeuf plays a cruel prank on him.
- Kevin Lover: All girls, mainly Nadia, Julie and Nathalie, love him. Voiced by Bob Saker.

== English history ==
Translated as Tootuff, it appeared for a short while during 2005 in The Dandy comic in the UK, with the books being translated as well (though they retained the original "Titeuf" title). The animated series was dubbed into English and aired on GMTV's Toonattik in the UK, Kabillion in the US, KBC Channel 1 in Kenya, TVB Pearl in Hong Kong and Cartoon Network in the United Kingdom and ABC in Australia.

== Bibliography ==
1. Dieu, le sexe et les bretelles (God, sex and Suspenders), 1993
2. L'Amour, c'est pô propre... (Love isn't clean), 1993
3. Ça épate les filles... (It impresses the girls), 1994
4. C'est pô juste... (It's unfair), 1995
5. Titeuf et le derrière des choses (The rear side of things), 1996
6. Tchô, monde cruel (Howdy, cruel world), 1997
7. Le miracle de la vie (The miracle of life), 1998
8. Lâchez-moi le slip ! (Get off my case!), 2000
9. La loi du préau (The law of the playground), 2002
10. Nadia se marie, (Nadia's wedding), 2004
11. Mes meilleurs copains (My best friends), 2006
12. Le sens de la vie (The meaning of life), 2008
13. À la folie (Folly !), 2012
14. Bienvenue en adolescence (Welcome to adolescence), 2015
15. À fond le slip ! (In the panties), 2017
16. Petite poésie des saisons (Little poetry of the seasons), 2019
17. La Grande Aventure (The Great Adventure), 2021
18. Suivez la mêche (Follow the wick), 2023

"Le Guide du zizi sexuel", a sex ed book based on the franchise published by Glénat editions, was released in 2001. It is a short guide with educational and humorous vocation, intended to answer the questions posed by pre-teens about love and sex.

== Film ==
In 2011 Titeuf le film was released in theaters.

== Games ==
The franchise has seen many video games released over the years.

=== 2000s ===
In the 2000s, Infogrames/Atari held the video game license to the franchise. These games were only released in European territories.

The first game, simply titled Titeuf, was released for the Game Boy Color in 2001. Developed by Planet Interactive, It is a party game that plays in a similar way to the Mario Party franchise. The game was released outside France as Tootuff.

The next game - Titeuf: Ze Gag Machine, was released for the Game Boy Advance in 2002, developed by Teddy Sday 3D Light Team. It was only released in France in French, but an English version under the name Tootuff: The Gag Machine also exists, suggesting that the game was going to be released in the UK as well.

The first console and PC game based on the comic - Titeuf: Mega-Compet', was released for the PlayStation 2 and Microsoft Windows in September 2004. Developed by Eden Games, this title contains a selection of minigames all connected together with a storyline. The PS2 version also has minigames that support the EyeToy Camera. A separate Game Boy Advance version developed by Dream On Studio was also released. All three versions were only available in France and are French-only.

In 2005, the character's first Nintendo DS game - Titeuf: Mission Nadia, was released, developed again by Dream On Studio. It is another minigame compilation that combines various genres of its type. It was released outside France as Tootuff: Mission Nadia.

In 2007, Le Monde de Titeuf and Le Monde de Nadia were released for the Nintendo DS, once more developed by Dream On Studio. Both titles were 3D action-adventure games with minigames as well, although each version having a different selection of minigames. They were released outside France as Tootuff's World and Nadia's World.

In 2008, the last Titeuf games from Atari were released - Titeuf Mégafunland and Nadia Mégafunland, again developed by Dream On Studio. They were also 3D action-adventure games with separate minigames for each title. Both titles were only released in France, but the games can be played in English as well.

=== 2010s ===
In 2011, a game based on Titeuf, le Film was released for the Wii, Microsoft Windows and the Nintendo DS which like with Mega Compet', consisted of many minigames. It was published by Deep Silver and developed by Tate Interactive. Like with Mega Compet', the game was only released in France.

In November 2019, Microids released a remaster of Titeuf Mega-Compet' titled Titeuf: Mega Party for the PlayStation 4, Xbox One, Nintendo Switch, Microsoft Windows and macOS. For the first time, the game was released in North America in addition to Europe, under the title of Mega Party - a Tootuff Adventure in English, with a new English translation and dub. The French release retained its 7+ rating, while the English release was increased to 12+ due to the game's content.

=== Other ===
There were also two Titeuf board games called "The Overmégamortel game" and "Titeuf: zizi sexuel le jeu" were released in 2008.

== Sources ==
- Titeuf albums Bedetheque (in French)

Footnotes
