= Bruno Dumont =

French filmmaker

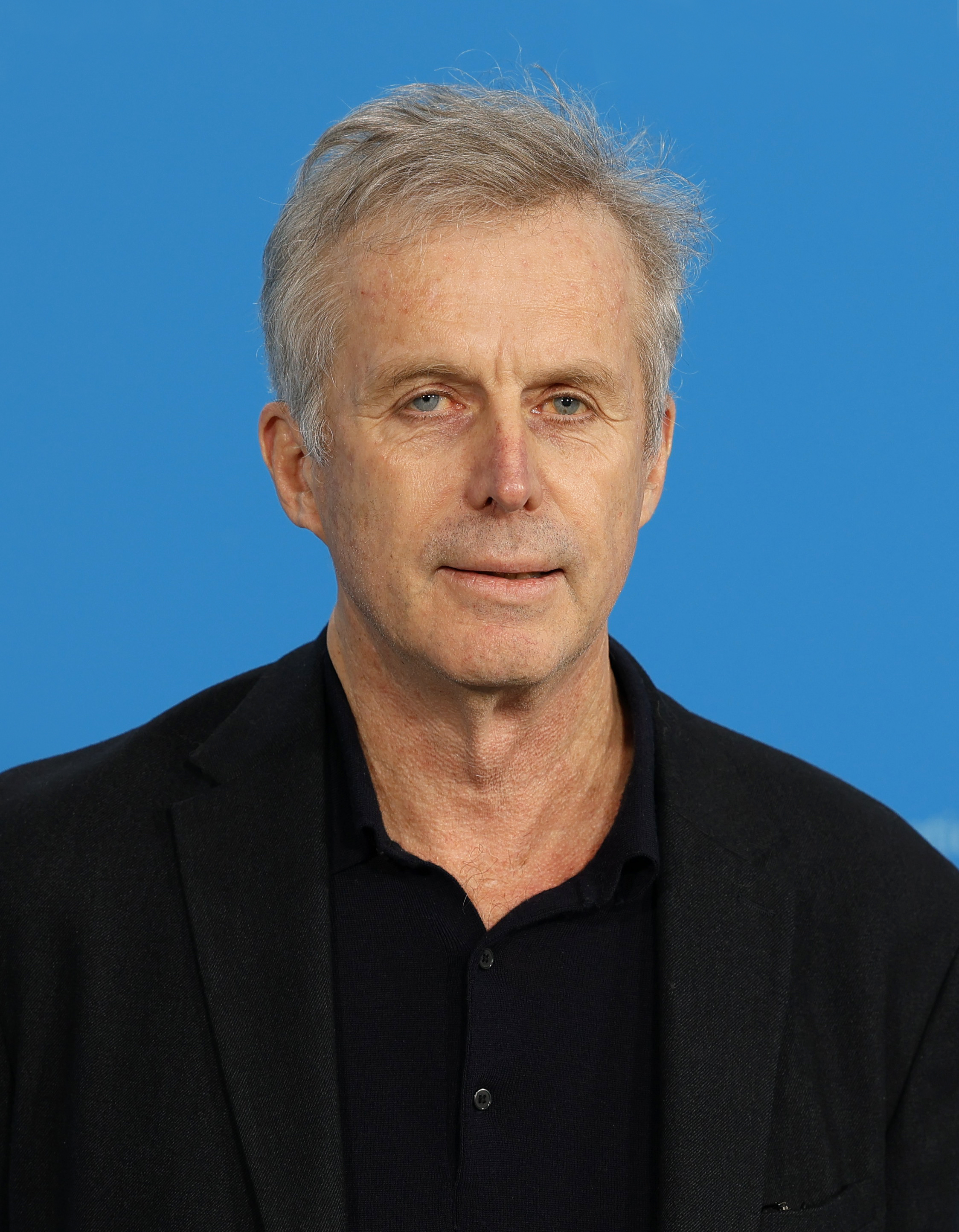
- Dumont in 2024
- Born: 14 March 1958 (age 68); Bailleul, Nord, France
- Occupations: Film director; screenwriter

Bruno Dumont (French: [dymɔ̃]; born 14 March 1958) is a French film director and screenwriter. Most known for his early social realistic films, which typically featured the use of extreme violence, provocative sexual behaviour, and amateur performers. Beginning in the late 2010s, Dumont has turned to absurdist comedies.

His films have won several awards at the Cannes Film Festival. Two of them won the Grand Prix (second place): L'Humanité (1999) and Flandres (2006).

== Early life ==
Dumont is a native of Bailleul, Nord. In 1977, he attempted the entrance exam for the Institut des hautes études cinématographiques (IDHEC), which he did not pass, and enrolled in the Faculty of Philosophy in Lille. In 1982, he taught philosophy to high school students in Hazebrouck and Beaucamps-Ligny, then general studies to BTS students.

Dumont's background in Greek and German (Western) philosophy influenced his later career as a filmmaker. Regarding leaving teaching philosophy as a profession he said: "I studied philosophy because it demands an intellectual outlook on the world [...] But I soon discovered that philosophy was too subjective: it lacks heart, it's over-intellectual, and I found that it made me cut myself off from the everyday".

=== Style ===
His early films show the ugliness of extreme violence and provocative sexual behaviour. His films are usually classified as art films, while he has likened his films to visual arts. He typically uses long takes, close-ups of people's bodies, and story lines involving extreme emotions.

His often polarising work has been connected to the cinéma du corps/cinema of the body, encompassing contemporary films by Claire Denis, Marina de Van, Gaspar Noé, Diane Bertrand, and François Ozon, among others. According to Tim Palmer, this trajectory includes a focus on states of corporeality in and of themselves, independent of narrative exposition or character psychology. In a more pejorative vein, James Quandt has also talked of some of this group of filmmakers, as the so-called New French Extremity.

== Career ==
=== 1990s ===
In 1992, Dumont directed his first short film, Paris (Paris). His feature debut The Life of Jesus (1997) had its world premiere in the Directors' Fortnight section of the 1997 Cannes Film Festival, where it won a special mention for the Caméra d'Or competition. The film created controversy at Cannes for its unsimulated sex scenes.

His drama film Humanité (1999) was his first film to enter the main competition of the Cannes Film Festival, where it won the Grand Prix (second place), Best Actor (Emmanuel Schotté) and Best Actress. An early example of slow cinema, it is one of Dumont's most acclaimed works to date.

=== 2000s ===
Twentynine Palms (2003) had its world premiere in the main competition of the 60th Venice International Film Festival, where it was nominated for the Golden Lion. It was Dumont's only film set outside France, shot on location in Twentynine Palms (California, United States). It follows an American photographer and his Russian girlfriend as they scout locations for a photo shoot. It received mixed reviews.

His following film was the highly political drama Flandres (2006), it follows a soldier sent to fight in an unnamed Middle Eastern country, where he experiences (and participates in) the horrors of war. Released during the Iraq War, the film had its world premiere in the main competition of the 2006 Cannes Film Festival, where it won the Grand Prix (second place).

Hadewijch (2009), explored conflicting interpretations of Catholicism and Islam. The film had its world premiere in the 2009 Toronto International Film Festival. Critics have noted the influence of Robert Bresson, but Dumont remarked that the comparisons were often exaggerated.

=== 2010s ===
Hors Satan (2011), had its world premiere in the Un Certain Regard section of the 2011 Cannes Film Festival, it was met with mixed reviews.

His biographical drama film Camille Claudel 1915 (2013), had its world premiere in the main competition of the 63rd Berlin International Film Festival, where it was nominated for the Golden Bear. It marks the first feature film directed by Dumont featuring well established actors, starring Juliette Binoche as Camille Claudel.

P'tit Quinquin (2014), originally planned as a miniseries, represented a shift in his career, moving from social realistic drama films to Absurdist comedy. The film had its world premiere in the Directors' Fortnight section of the 2014 Cannes Film Festival.

Slack Bay (2016), another absurdist comedy, had its world premiere in the main competition of the 2016 Cannes Film Festival, where it was nominated for the Palme d'Or. It stars Fabrice Luchini, Juliette Binoche and Valeria Bruni Tedeschi. French film magazine Cahiers du Cinéma ranked the film as the 5th best film of 2016. It also marked Dumont's first box office success.

His first musical-comedy film, Jeannette: The Childhood of Joan of Arc (2017) had its world premiere in the Un Certain Regard section of the 2017 Cannes Film Festival. Set in France during the Hundred Years' War, the film portrays Joan of Arc's religious awakening as a child and her decision to fight against the English invasion as she grows up.

The miniseries Coincoin and the Extra-Humans (2018), another higly political absurdist comedy, followed the alienated French far-right, featuring most of P'tit Quinquin cast.

Joan of Arc (2019), a direct sequel to Jeannette: The Childhood of Joan of Arc, had its world premiere in the Un Certain Regard section of the 2019 Cannes Film Festival, where it won a Special Mention. A straighforward drama film, it follows the aftermath of Joan of Arc capture by the Burgundians, and the preparation for her trial. It received mixed reviews.

=== 2020s ===
France (2021), another absurdist comedy, had its world premiere in the main competition of the 2021 Cannes Film Festival, where it was nominated for the Palme d'Or. Starring Léa Seydoux, Blanche Gardin and Benjamin Biolay, it follows the role of the media in contemporary France.

His science fiction absurdist comedy The Empire (2024), had its world premiere in the main competition of the 74th Berlin International Film Festival, where it won the Silver Bear Jury Prize (third place). Starring Lyna Khoudri, Anamaria Vartolomei, Camille Cottin and Fabrice Luchini, it's a parody of the Star Wars franchise and Hollywood blockbusters in general, reflecting contemporary France.

Red Rocks (2026) had its world premiere in the Directors' Fortnight section of the 2026 Cannes Film Festival. Set on the Côte d'Azur, two gangs of children engage in their favorite game: jumping from the red rocks in the Mediterranean. It stars a large cast of amateur actors.

=== Upcoming projects ===
In late 2026, Dumont announced his first fully generative AI feature, The End, based on a screenplay he wrote twenty-five years ago, about a dystopian Los Angeles ravaged by earthquakes and falling asteroids. Production began in August and concluded by November. Produced independently, the film has no sales agent attached yet, but is expected to be released in the festival circuit in 2027.

== Personal life ==
Dumont is an atheist.

== Filmography ==
=== Feature films ===
Year	English title	Original title	Notes
1997	The Life of Jesus	La vie de Jésus	Camera d'Or - Special Mention
1999	Humanité		Cannes Grand Prix
2003	Twentynine Palms		
2006	Flandres	Flanders	Cannes Grand Prix
2009	Hadewijch		International Film Critics' prize at TIFF
2011	Hors Satan		
2013	Camille Claudel 1915		
2014	Li'l Quinquin	P'tit Quinquin	
2016	Slack Bay	Ma Loute	
2017	Jeannette: The Childhood of Joan of Arc	Jeannette, l'enfance de Jeanne d'Arc	
2018	Coincoin and the Extra-Humans	Coincoin et les z'inhumains	
2019	Joan of Arc	Jeanne	Special Mention - Un Certain Regard
2021	France		
2024	The Empire	L'Empire	Silver Bear Jury Prize
2026	Red Rocks	Les Roches Rouges	
TBA	The End		Post-production

=== Short films ===
- Paris (1993)
- P'tit Quinquin / Li'l Quinquin (1993)
- Marie et Freddy / Marie and Freddy (1994)
