= Zep (cartoonist) =

Swiss comic book creator

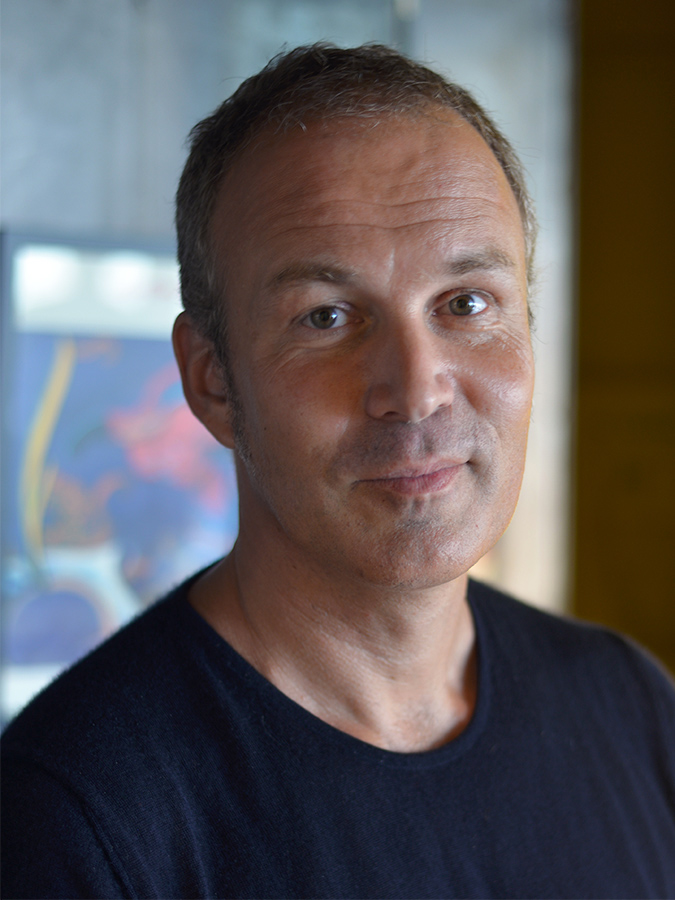
- Zep in 2015
- Born: Philippe Chappuis; December 15, 1967 (age 58) Onex, Switzerland
- Areas: artist, writer
- Notable works: Titeuf; Victor
- Awards: full list

Philippe Chappuis (born December 15, 1967), better known by his pen name Zep, is a Francophone Swiss cartoonist and illustrator. Zep is mostly known for his comics series Titeuf which he created in 1992, and has become since one of the most popular children's comics in French-speaking countries. He also founded the associated Franco-Belgian comics magazine Tchô!.

== Biography ==
Philippe Chappuis was born on December 15, 1967, in the city of Onex on the outskirts of Geneva in Switzerland; he is the son of a policeman and a clothes designer. As a child, he was an avid reader of Franco-Belgian comics or bande dessinée, and dreamed of becoming a professional cartoonist. At the age of 12, he took the artist name "Zep" as a nod to English rock band Led Zeppelin. As a teenager, he studied decorative arts in Geneva.

Zep's career as cartoonist began with the creation of the character Victor, whose comics were published in a weekly women's magazine and then in Belgian children's comic magazine Spirou in 1987. Zep also drew comics for several fanzines. In the Catholic monthly Vie, he drew the satirical comic Les Amours Contrariées de Calin & Labelle. .

In the early 1990s, Zep created the comic series Titeuf inspired by memories of his own childhood. At first struggling to find publication, the series was initially published in the fanzine Sauve qui peut before it was noticed by Glénat executive Jean-Claude Camano. Zep joined Glénat in 1992, and the first Titeuf album, Dieu, le sexe et les bretelles (God, Sex And Suspenders) was published in 1993. It sold only a few thousand copies, but the following books have gradually won over a huge readership, outselling traditional French favorites such as Astérix and Lucky Luke. More than 23 million copies of the series have been sold, and the series is considered the greatest moneymaker in the French comics market. Titeuf books have been translated into 15 languages, including Chinese, Italian and German. In the UK, Titeuf appeared under the name Tootuff in The Dandy. The comics has been adapted into an animated series and a feature-length film, directed by Zep.

In 1998, he was one of the founders of children's comic magazine Tchô!, featuring Titeuf as its mascot, and with Zep as the lead editor. Tchô! featured comics from various authors, including series authored by Zep such as Titeuf, Les Chronokids (with artists Stan & Vince) and Captain Biceps (with artist Tébo), the latter of which was adapted into an animated series.

With cartoonist and illustrator Hélène Bruller, Zep co-authored sex education manual Le guide du zizi sexuel featuring illustrations with characters from Titeuf. Zep and Bruller also co-authored the children's book Les Minijusticiers which was adapted into an animated series.

In 2004, Zep was the recipient of the Grand Prix de la ville d'Angoulême, a lifetime achievement award which is one of the most prestigious in Franco-Belgian comics, making Zep the first Swiss author to receive the award.

In 2006, Zep authored Découpé en tranches, an autobiographical graphic novel in the form of short stories in which the author details various aspects of his life.

In 2009, he authored the adult comic album Happy Sex, a compilation of humorous stories about sexuality. It was followed in 2010 by Happy Girls and Happy Rock which were re-editions of Les filles électriques and L'enfer des concerts respectively, originally released in the late 1990s. In 2014, Zep released the comic album Happy Parents about parenthood, and in 2019 Happy Sex 2 as a follow-up to Happy Sex.

In the 2010s, Zep released graphic novels such as Une histoire d'hommes (2013), Un bruit étrange et beau (2016) and The End (2018), which were received by some critics as works outside of children's comics that cover mature themes, in an art style that has been described as more "realistic" than his previous works.

Himself a hobbyist guitar player who has played for a number of Swiss bands, Zep also designed album covers for Jean-Jacques Goldman (Chanson pour les pieds, 2001), Bill Deraime (Bouge encore, 2008), Henri Dès (Casse-pieds, 2013) and Renaud (Les mômes et les enfants d’abord, 2019), for whom he also directed the music video for Renaud's song "Les animals".

== Personal life ==
Zep was previously married to French illustrator and comic artist Hélène Bruller, with whom he co-authored the children's comic Les Minijusticiers and sex education book Le guide du zizi sexuel. He later married Swiss writer Mélanie Chappuis.

== Bibliography ==
- Victor n’en rate pas une, 1988
- Léon Coquillard, scenario by Gilli, 1990
- Kradok : Amanite Bunker, scenario by Leglode, 1991
- Les amours contrariées de Calin et Labelle, 1995
- Les filles électriques, 1997
- L’enfer des concerts, 1999
- Mes héros de la Bande Dessinée, 2001
- Le Guide du zizi sexuel, scenario by Hélène Bruller, 2001
- Les Minijusticiers (The Minimighty Kids), scenario by Hélène Bruller, 2003
- Petite poésie des saisons, 2005
- Découpé en tranches, 2006
- Portraits de famille, scenario by Benoît Mouchart, 2006
- Titeuf
1. Dieu, le sexe et les bretelles, 1993
2. L’amour c’est pô propre, 1993
3. Ça épate les filles, 1994
4. C’est pô juste, 1995
5. Titeuf et le derrière des choses, 1996
6. Tchô, monde cruel, 1997
7. Le miracle de la vie, 1998
8. Lâchez-moi le slip, 2000
9. La loi du préau, 2002
10. Nadia se marie, 2004
11. Mes meilleurs copains, 2006
12. Le sens de la vie, 2008
13. À la folie, 2012
14. Bienvenue en adolescence, 2015
15. À fond le slip, 2017
16. Petite poésie des saisons, 2019
17. La grande aventure, 2021
- Captain Biceps, art by Tébo
1. L'invincible, 2004
2. Le redoutable, 2005
3. L'invulnérable, 2006
- Les Chronokids, art by Stan & Vince (6 tomes, 2008-2018)
- Happy Books
1. Happy Sex, 2009
2. Happy Girls, 2010
3. Happy Rock, 2010
4. Happy Parents, 2014
5. Happy Sex 2, 2019
- Une histoire d'hommes, 2013
- What a wonderful world (2 tomes, 2015-2016)
- Esmera, art by Vince
- Un bruit étrange et beau, 2016
- The End, 2018
- Ce que nous sommes, 2022

== Awards ==
- 1993: Sierre Comics Festival Prix de l'humour
- 1995: Livres Hebdo Prix Jeunesse
- 1996: Angoulême Festival, Alph Art jeunesse, for C'est pô juste!
- 1996: Sierre Comics Festival Prix du public
- 2003: Angoulême Festival Audience Award
- 2004: Grand Prix de la ville d'Angoulême and Angoulême Festival Best promotional comic
- 2007: Prix Canal J for best youth comic for Titeuf
- 2009: Prix Canal J for Titeuf

== Sources ==
- Zep publications in Spirou BDoubliées (in French)
- Zep albums Bedetheque (in French)
