= The Good Lord Bird =

2013 novel by James McBride

- Cover to The Good Lord Bird
- Author: James McBride
- Audio read by: Michael Boatman
- Language: English
- Genre: Historical fiction, comic
- Published: Riverhead Books
- Publication date: August 20, 2013
- Publication place: United States
- Media type: Print (hardcover, paperback), audiobook, ebook
- Pages: 417 pp. (hardcover 1st ed.)
- Awards: 2013 National Book Award for Fiction
- ISBN: 9781594486340 (hardcover 1st ed.)
- OCLC: 820123671
- Dewey Decimal: 813/.6
- LC Class: PS3613.C28 G66 2013

The Good Lord Bird is a 2013 novel by American journalist and author James McBride. The story follows Henry Shackleford, a young enslaved boy in Kansas Territory who becomes entangled with the radical abolitionist John Brown during the violent years of Bleeding Kansas and eventually takes part in Brown's famous raid on Harpers Ferry in 1859. Told in a distinctive, humorous first-person voice, the novel blends historical fact with comic invention and explores themes of race, identity, freedom, and the nature of heroism. The Good Lord Bird won the National Book Award for Fiction in 2013 and was adapted into a limited television series starring Ethan Hawke.

== Plot ==
The novel is presented as the discovered memoirs of Henry Shackleford, an elderly former slave, written in a colloquial style. In 1856, when Henry is about twelve years old, his father is killed during a violent confrontation between pro-slavery and free-state forces in Kansas Territory. The abolitionist John Brown is present at the scene and, in the chaos, mistakes the young Henry for a girl. Brown gives Henry a dress to wear and nicknames him "Little Onion" after the boy eats a particularly foul onion that Brown had given him. The nickname sticks, and for much of the narrative Henry lives disguised as a girl, wearing dresses and being treated as a young woman by Brown's followers.

Henry travels with Brown's ragtag band of abolitionist fighters across Kansas and into Missouri. He witnesses the brutal guerrilla warfare of Bleeding Kansas, including the Pottawatomie massacre, in which Brown and his men killed five pro-slavery settlers. The boy is both horrified and fascinated by Brown's unshakable religious conviction and his willingness to use violence in the name of ending slavery. Along the way, Henry encounters a gallery of historical figures: the eloquent and self-regarding Frederick Douglass, the fearless Harriet Tubman, and other abolitionists. Douglass is portrayed as a vain man who is often drunk and womanising, while Tubman appears as a small, determined woman with a short temper and immense courage.

The narrative follows Brown's shifting fortunes as he moves from Kansas to Canada and then back to the United States, gathering support and funds for his grand plan to attack the federal arsenal at Harpers Ferry, Virginia. Henry remains with Brown through all these adventures, often serving as a spy or messenger. He becomes attached to Brown's daughter, a fierce young woman named Ellen, and develops a complicated romantic and emotional life while disguised as a girl. His masquerade leads to many comic situations, but also allows McBride to probe the fluidity of gender and the masks that enslaved and free Black people had to wear to survive.

The novel's climax arrives with the raid on Harpers Ferry in October 1859. Henry is present during the ill-fated attack, which begins well enough with the capture of the armoury but quickly collapses into chaos as federal troops, led by Robert E. Lee, surround the town. Brown is wounded and captured, and many of his men are killed. Henry manages to escape, fleeing north to freedom. The novel ends with an elderly Henry reflecting on his life and the meaning of Brown's sacrifice, suggesting that Brown's soul was both mad and holy, and that his violent acts helped push the nation toward the Civil War and emancipation.

== Background and inspiration ==
James McBride had been fascinated by John Brown since childhood. In interviews, he recounted that his father, a minister, kept a photograph of Brown in their home and spoke of him as a hero. McBride, however, was also aware of Brown's violent methods and his reputation as a fanatic. The tension between Brown's moral clarity and his bloody deeds became the central puzzle that the novel seeks to explore.

McBride began researching Brown's life in the late 2000s, reading biographies, letters, and contemporary newspaper accounts. He was struck by the fact that Brown was deeply religious and utterly convinced that he was an instrument of God's will. McBride wanted to write a novel that did not pass easy judgment on Brown but instead allowed readers to see the man in all his complexity. He decided to tell the story through the eyes of a fictional enslaved boy, a device that gave him the freedom to blend humor with horror and to explore the absurdity of racism from a fresh perspective.

The title of the book comes from a nickname that Brown's men gave to a bird, the ivory-billed woodpecker, which they encountered during their travels. In the novel, the "Good Lord Bird" becomes a symbol of fleeting, rare beauty and of the divine presence that Brown believed guided his actions. The phrase also echoes the colloquial speech patterns that McBride uses throughout the narrative.

== Style and narration ==
The novel is narrated in the first person by Henry Shackleford, using a voice that is folksy, ungrammatical, and filled with vivid imagery. McBride has said that he wanted to capture the sound of an old man telling a story on a porch, mixing tall tales with sharp observation. The dialect is deliberately inconsistent, mixing nineteenth-century speech with modern phrasing, a choice that some critics praised for its energy and others found distracting.

The comic tone of the novel sets it apart from many other works about slavery. McBride uses humor to disarm the reader and to highlight the absurdities of the racist society he describes. The running joke of Henry's gender disguise, for example, is treated with a light touch that never feels mean-spirited. At the same time, the novel does not shy away from the brutal violence of the era. The juxtaposition of comedy and horror gives The Good Lord Bird its distinctive rhythm and allows it to address weighty themes without becoming preachy.

== Themes ==
=== Racial identity and passing ===
Henry's disguise as a girl is one of the novel's central conceits, but it also serves as a metaphor for the ways in which enslaved people had to hide their true selves to survive. Henry learns to perform femininity just as he has learned to perform subservience. The novel suggests that all Black Americans in the antebellum period were, in some sense, wearing a mask, presenting a version of themselves that white society would find acceptable.

=== Religion and violence ===
John Brown's Calvinist faith drives every decision he makes. He believes that he is chosen by God to purge the land of the sin of slavery, and he is willing to kill to achieve that end. The novel explores the moral ambiguity of using violence in the service of a righteous cause. Brown is portrayed as both a prophet and a madman, a man whose certainty is both inspiring and terrifying.

=== Heroism and historical memory ===
Through Henry's eyes, the reader sees Brown not as a marble statue but as a flesh-and-blood human being, with bad breath, a messy beard, and a tendency to pray for hours at a time. The novel questions what it means to be a hero and suggests that the people we remember as saints were often deeply flawed. At the same time, it honors Brown's courage and insists that his willingness to die for the cause of freedom was a genuine act of heroism.

=== Freedom and belonging ===
Henry's journey is not just a physical one but an emotional and spiritual quest. Over the course of the novel, he moves from being a frightened child to a young man who has seen the worst and the best of human nature. His relationship with Brown gives him a sense of purpose, and by the end of the story he has come to understand that freedom is not just the absence of chains but the ability to live with dignity and to choose one's own path.

== Historical accuracy and characters ==
McBride took many liberties with historical facts, a choice he acknowledged in an author's note. Real figures such as Frederick Douglass, Harriet Tubman, and John Brown are rendered with broad, satirical strokes. Douglass, in particular, is depicted as a brilliant orator who is also vain, fond of drink, and condescending toward Brown's rough manners. This portrayal generated some controversy, but McBride defended it by saying that he was writing fiction, not biography, and that his goal was to humanize these figures rather than to sanctify them.

The novel accurately captures the atmosphere of Bleeding Kansas, the series of violent confrontations that preceded the Civil War. The Pottawatomie massacre, the Battle of Black Jack, and other real events are woven into the narrative. The raid on Harpers Ferry is described in vivid, chaotic detail, capturing both the idealism of Brown's plan and the tragic incompetence of its execution.

== Reception ==
The Good Lord Bird received widespread critical acclaim. In a review for the Los Angeles Times, Héctor Tobar called the novel "laugh-out-loud funny and filled with many wonderfully bizarre images", but noted that it lacked some of the deep humanity of classic works like Huckleberry Finn or Middle Passage. He concluded that "those looking for verisimilitude or gravitas in their historical fiction might want to avoid The Good Lord Bird."

Laura Miller of Salon drew explicit comparisons between the novel and Huckleberry Finn, arguing that both books use a young, naive narrator to expose the moral failings of American society. She noted that Henry, like Huck, must decide whether to follow the law or to listen to his own conscience, and that his eventual flight to freedom mirrors Huck's decision to "light out for the territory." Christine Brunkhorst in the Star Tribune wrote that the two novels share "drunken rebels, brutal slave owners, spineless men, clairvoyant women, crooked judges and some brave and principled people."

Novelist Amity Gaige, writing in the San Francisco Chronicle, praised McBride's "reimagining" of John Brown's story and his ability to "novelize real historical events without dreary prostrations to the act." She admired the way the book "manages to be a rollicking adventure, a sly satire, and a heartfelt tribute all at once."

Some reviewers expressed reservations. A few found the comic treatment of slavery uncomfortable, arguing that the novel risked trivialising the suffering of enslaved people. Others felt that the satire of Frederick Douglass crossed a line into caricature. McBride addressed these criticisms by stating that his intention was never to mock the abolitionist movement but to show its participants as real, flawed human beings who nevertheless accomplished great things.

== Awards ==
The Good Lord Bird won the National Book Award for Fiction in 2013, a decision that surprised many in the literary world because McBride was not considered the frontrunner. The judges described McBride as "a voice as comic and original as any we have heard since Mark Twain." McBride, who had not prepared an acceptance speech, was visibly stunned when his name was announced. He later said that he had been so certain of losing that he had left his phone at his hotel and could not call his family immediately afterward.

In addition to the National Book Award, the novel received a number of other honors. It was longlisted for the Andrew Carnegie Medals for Excellence in Fiction and Nonfiction in 2014, won the BCALA Literary Award for Fiction, and was a finalist for the Hurston/Wright Legacy Award. The audiobook, narrated by Michael Boatman, was named an Editors' Choice by Booklist. The novel was also longlisted for the International Dublin Literary Award in 2015.

Year	Award	Category	Result	Ref.
2013	National Book Award	Fiction	Won	
2014	Andrew Carnegie Medals for Excellence	Fiction	Longlisted	
2014	BCALA Literary Awards	Fiction	Won	
2014	Booklist Editors' Choice	Adult Audio	Won	
2014	Hurston/Wright Legacy Award	Fiction	Finalist	
2014	Maine Readers' Choice Award	—	Longlisted	
2015	International Dublin Literary Award	—	Longlisted	
2015	Meilleurs livres de l'année du magazine Lire	Révélation étrangère	Longlisted	

== Adaptation ==
In 2018, it was announced that Ethan Hawke and Jason Blum would adapt the novel into a limited television series. Hawke, a longtime admirer of McBride's work, had approached the author about the rights after reading the book. He co-wrote the screenplay, served as an executive producer, and starred as John Brown.

The seven-episode series premiered on Showtime on October 4, 2020. It received strong reviews, with particular praise for Hawke's performance, which was described as fiery and unhinged, capturing both Brown's religious fervor and his tenderness. The cast also included Joshua Caleb Johnson as Onion, Daveed Diggs as Frederick Douglass, and Zainab Jah as Harriet Tubman. The adaptation remained largely faithful to the novel's tone, balancing dark comedy with moments of intense drama.

== Legacy and influence ==
The Good Lord Bird has been credited with reviving popular interest in John Brown at a time when the country was grappling with its history of racial violence. The novel has been taught in high school and college courses on American literature and African American history. Scholars have noted that McBride's irreverent approach opened up new conversations about how slavery and abolitionism can be represented in fiction.

The book also cemented McBride's reputation as one of the most versatile writers of his generation. Already known for his memoir The Color of Water (1996) and his novel Miracle at St. Anna (2002), he had struggled for years to find a commercial success on the scale of his nonfiction. The Good Lord Bird changed that, bringing him a new audience and leading to a period of remarkable productivity. His subsequent novel, Deacon King Kong (2020), also set in a Black community and infused with humor and faith, was widely acclaimed and further extended his literary range.

The novel continues to be widely read and discussed. In 2021, a stage adaptation was announced, and the book has been the subject of numerous literary festivals and reading group discussions. Its blend of comedy, tragedy, and moral urgency has ensured that it remains a touchstone in the ongoing conversation about race, religion, and violence in American history.
