= Darren Goldstein =

American actor (born 1974)

- Born: August 27, 1974 (age 52); Long Island, New York, USA
- Education: New York University
- Occupation: Actor
- Spouse: Katie Finneran (m. 2010)
- Children: 2

Darren Goldstein (born August 27 1974) is an American actor best known for his roles in Ozark and The Affair.

== Personal life and education ==
Goldstein graduated with an MFA from New York University's Graduate Acting Program. He met actor Katie Finneran in 2008 when they were both in a Williamstown Festival and Bay Street Theatre production of Beyond Therapy. They married in August 2010 and have two children.

== Work ==
=== TV ===
Year	Title	Role	Notes
2004	Law & Order: Criminal Intent	Clayton Sherwood	
2008	As the World Turns	Agent Helms	
2007–2010	Damages	Chris Sharp	7 episodes
2010	Rubicon	Agent Ryan Farber	2 episodes
2012	Common Law	Gordon	
2013	Blue Bloods	Asher Lefko	
2014	Nurse Jackie	Sammy's father	
2014–2018	The Affair	Oscar Hodges	15 episodes
2015	The Odyssey	Joe Abrams	10 episodes
2015–2016	Inside Amy Schumer	Ryan / Jon	2 episodes
2016	Person of Interest	Brent Tomlinson	
2017	The Real Stephen Blatt	Mr Blatt	
2017	The Gifted	Chuck	
2018	Blindspot	Donald Shipley	
2018	Kevin Can Wait	Steve	
2018–2022	Ozark	Charles Wilkes	11 episodes
2019	Bull	Agent Timothy Stokes	
2019	Mommy Blogger	Chaz	
2019	Law & Order: Special Victims Unit	Richard Matthews	
2020	FBI	Nathan Ford	
2020	The Blacklist	Arthur Rodman	
2020	Billions	Simon Shenk	
2020	The Good Lord Bird	Hugh Forbes	
2021	American Crime Story	Jackie Bennett	6 episodes
2022	Law & Order	John Richardson	Episode: "Legacy"
2022	Under the Banner of Heaven	Mr. Wright	4 episodes
2023	The Gilded Age	Henderson	3 episodes
2024	The Franchise	Pat Shannon	8 episodes

=== Film ===
Year	Title	Role
2010	Five Days Gone	Greg
2011	Win Win	Sheffield Coach
2011	Limitless	Kevin Doyle
2012	Playdate	Detective Iommi
2013	Also Christmas	Border Guard
2013	Guilty	Darren McCormick
2017	Detroit	Detective Tanchuck
2017	Staring at the Sun	Rabbi Segal
2018	Paterno	Mike McQuery
2021	Death Saved My Life	Shawn Daley
2021	A Mouthful of Air	Kevin
2023	Sharper	Pat Braddock

== Theatre ==
Theatre credits include:

=== Broadway ===
The Little Foxes, Bloody Bloody Andrew Jackson

=== Off-Broadway ===
Continuity, The Madrid, Rasheeda Speaking, The Good Mother, Abigail’s Party, Mouth to Mouth, Oohrah!, Mary Rose, Gutenberg! The Musical!, The Bedwetter.

=== Regional ===
The Forgotten Woman, Beyond Therapy

== Awards ==
For his role in Ozark, Goldstein was part of the ensemble nominated for a Screen Actors Guild Award for Outstanding Performance by an Ensemble in a Drama Series in 2019, 2021, and 2023. He was nominated for a Lucille Lortel Award for his role of Donald in the 2022 musical The Bedwetter.
