= The Good Lord Bird (miniseries) =

2020 miniseries by Ethan Hawke

- Official poster
- Genre: Historical drama; Dark comedy
- Created by: Ethan Hawke; Mark Richard
- Based on: The Good Lord Bird by James McBride
- Starring: Ethan Hawke; Hubert Point-Du Jour; Beau Knapp; Nick Eversman; Ellar Coltrane; Jack Alcott; Mo Brings Plenty; Daveed Diggs; Joshua Caleb Johnson
- Opening theme: "Come on Children, Let's Sing" by Mahalia Jackson
- Country of origin: United States
- Original language: English
- No. of episodes: 7

Production
- Executive producers: Jason Blum; Ethan Hawke; Mark Richard; Padraic McKinley; Albert Hughes; Jeremy Gold; Marci Wiseman; James McBride; Brian Taylor; Ryan Hawke; David Schiff; Marshall Persinger
- Production location: Richmond, Virginia
- Running time: 46–57 minutes
- Production companies: Under The Influence; Mark 924 Entertainment; Blumhouse Productions

Original release
- Network: Showtime
- Release: October 4 – November 15, 2020

The Good Lord Bird is a 2020 American historical drama television miniseries, based on the 2013 novel of the same name by James McBride. Focusing on John Brown's attack on American slavery, the series was created and executive produced by Ethan Hawke and Mark Richard. Produced by Jason Blum, through Blumhouse Television, it premiered on October 4, 2020, on Showtime.

== Premise ==
The series is told from the point of view of Henry "Onion" Shackleford (Joshua Caleb Johnson), a fictional enslaved boy, who is part of John Brown's (Ethan Hawke) motley crew of abolitionist soldiers during the time of Bleeding Kansas. They eventually participate in the famous 1859 raid on the Federal Armory at Harpers Ferry, Virginia (it became part of West Virginia in 1863). Brown's raid failed to initiate a slave revolt as he intended, but it was one of the events that led to the American Civil War.

It is not just the story of Brown but that of those that accompanied him. According to Hawke, "If you really study this character, he asks a lot of you philosophically. He challenges why so many of us accept the unacceptable". Author James McBride was involved in the production and according to him, "John Brown is a real hero to me and to many Black people who are no longer alive. John Brown gave his life and two of his sons' lives to the cause of freedom for Black people, and he started the Civil War. They buried this man's story for a long time....".

== Cast ==
=== Main ===
- Ethan Hawke as John Brown
- Hubert Point-Du Jour as Bob
- Beau Knapp as Owen Brown
- Nick Eversman as John Brown Jr.
- Ellar Coltrane as Salmon Brown
- Jack Alcott as Jason Brown
- Mo Brings Plenty as Ottawa Jones
- Daveed Diggs as Frederick Douglass
- Joshua Caleb Johnson as Henry "Onion" Shackleford

=== Recurring ===
- Wyatt Russell as J. E. B. Stuart
- Rafael Casal as John Cook
- McKinley Belcher III as Broadnax
- Steve Zahn as Chase
- Victor Williams as Coachman Jim
- Quentin Plair as Emperor
- Miles Mussenden as Dangerfield Newby
- Ali Amin Carter as Lewis Leary
- Orlando Jones as Hayward Shepherd (The Rail Man)
- Brooks Ashmanskas as Lewis Washington

=== Guest ===
- Darren Goldstein as Hugh Forbes
- Zainab Jah as Harriet Tubman
- Maya Hawke as Annie Brown
- David Morse as Dutch Henry Sherman
- Alex Sharp as Preacher
- Gia Crovatin as Martha
- Killer Mike as Clarence
- Keith David as Herbert

== Episodes ==
No.	Title	Directed by	Written by	Original release date	U.S. viewers (millions)
1	"Meet the Lord"	Albert Hughes	Mark Richard & Ethan Hawke	October 4, 2020	0.251
In 1858 territorial Kansas, young slave Henry Shackleford is taken on the run by fanatical abolitionist John Brown after his father is killed. Mistaking Henry for a girl and nicknaming him Onion, Brown adopts "her" into his ragtag band of soldiers, killing pro-slavery settlers in his crusade to liberate all slaves. Onion befriends Brown's son Frederick, who believes in the omen of the "Good Lord bird", and fellow runaway slave Bob joins Brown's men. When two of his sons are captured, Brown takes pro-slavery red shirts prisoner at the Battle of Black Jack, exchanging them with Army First Lieutenant J. E. B. Stuart for the return of his sons. After Frederick is shot in cold blood, his brothers are unwilling to continue the fight, and Brown rides off alone.
2	"A Wicked Plot"	Kevin Hooks	Erika L. Johnson & Mark Richard	October 11, 2020	0.254
Burying Frederick, his brothers plan to ride for Tabor, Iowa. Onion and Bob set off for Tabor themselves, but red shirts mistake Onion for a mixed-race woman and escort them to a hotel in Pikesville, Missouri instead. Bob is sent to a sawmill, while Onion becomes enamored with Pie, a prostitute who puts him to work cleaning floors in exchange for secretly teaching her to read. Brown's son Owen promises to return for Onion, and Pie betrays her fellow slaves for planning an insurrection. Their leader, Sibonia, is questioned by her preacher, who renounces the town as Sibonia and eight other slaves are hanged. Brown and his men storm the town, and Onion frees the slaves as he, Bob, and fellow slave Broadnax are rescued.
3	"Mister Fred"	Darnell Martin	Erika L. Johnson & Jeff Augustin	October 18, 2020	0.182
Stuart urges Brown to surrender, revealing a government bounty on his head. Brown informs a compatriot's widow that her husband has been killed, and Brown's men sign his Declaration of Liberty against slavery. Onion, still posing as a girl, travels with Brown by train to Rochester, New York, where Frederick Douglass delivers his July 4th speech and invites them to his home, which he shares with his Black wife, Anna, and his White lover, Ottilie. Douglass fears Brown's plan of action is too radical, while Onion has acquired a taste for liquor, and nearly runs away via the Underground Railroad, but changes his mind after meeting Douglass's associate Emperor, an escaped slave.
4	"Smells Like Bear"	Kevin Hooks	Mark Richard & Kristen SaBerre	October 25, 2020	0.235
Hunted by federal agents, Brown delivers a series of speeches, raising money and support for the abolitionist cause. He gives Hugh Forbes, a mercenary who claims to have fought with Giuseppe Garibaldi, a large payment to train his men, but Forbes leaves town with the money. Forced to reach Canada on foot, Onion is frustrated at still being made to follow a White man's orders. An understanding Brown leaves Onion with his grandmother's Bible and the chance for a free life, before making an impassioned call to arms in Chatham, Ontario. The audience is supportive, but questions Brown's yet-to-be-announced plan, until Harriet Tubman urges them to put their faith in Brown. He enlists several willing recruits, including Onion, and Brown reveals his plan to his men: raiding the federal armory at Harpers Ferry, Virginia and launching a guerrilla campaign not only to free nearby slaves, but start a civil war.
5	"Hiving the Bees"	Haifaa al-Mansour	Mark Richard & Lauren Signorino	November 1, 2020	0.206
Onion and Cook, a new recruit, arrive in Maryland, where Cook rents a farmhouse as a base of operations, but his womanizing draws the attention of a neighbor, Mrs. Hoffmaster. Forced to pose as Cook's female servant, Onion tries to enlist slaves from Colonel Louis Washington's plantation, and Heyward Shepherd, a free Black railroad worker, agrees to bring reinforcements by train. Brown and his men arrive with his pregnant daughter-in-law Martha and his daughter Annie. Onion is smitten with Annie, while Douglass refuses to support Brown's plan, declaring it a suicide mission, but Emperor joins instead. Mrs. Hoffmaster's suspicions force Brown to launch the attack earlier than planned, and Onion is sent away to safety with Annie and Martha. Realizing he forgot to give Shepherd's password to Brown, Onion reveals he is a boy before kissing Annie and racing to warn the others.
6	"Jesus Is Walkin'"	Kate Woods	Mark Richard & Erika L. Johnson	November 8, 2020	0.190
Brown and his men raid the armory in the night, taking hostages and preparing to seize thousands of rifles, which Owen and Bob wait at the farmhouse to receive. Onion arrives too late, as Brown's son Jason stops Heyward's train but, confronted without the password, he shoots and kills Heyward. The raiders realize the wave of supporters Brown hopes to rally to their side are not coming, but he remains certain of divine victory. By morning, the raid is discovered, as Brown, Onion, and the others barricade themselves in the armory's fire engine house. Brown releases an elderly hostage, followed by another in exchange for breakfast, but a deadly gunfight soon erupts. Onion, Bob, and Cook escape to the nearby plantation, where Washington's slave Jim takes his master as another hostage. They rejoin the others, and the mayor of Harpers Ferry is killed attempting to negotiate with an increasingly erratic Brown. Federal troops surround the armory, and Brown's son Oliver dies in his arms.
7	"Last Words"	Michael Nankin	Mark Richard & Ethan Hawke	November 15, 2020	0.317
Narration from Douglass suggests the failed raid at Harpers Ferry helped ignite the Civil War, ultimately securing the end of slavery. Stuart gives the raiders until dawn to surrender, but they are resigned to their fate, Black and White alike. While Brown and his men make their last stand, Onion escapes with the hostages. Unsure if Stuart recognizes him, Onion is returned to Bob and Owen, revealing himself as a boy, and they learn Brown has been taken prisoner. Owen departs for his family's farm, and Bob sets off for a job to buy his own family out of slavery. Onion arranges to visit Brown on the eve of his execution, praying together in his cell and sharing a heartfelt goodbye. Asked why he never questioned Onion's disguise, Brown reassures him that he loved him all the same. Living as a young Black man again, Onion is turned away from Brown's hanging, but imagines his final words to be, "What a beautiful country."

== Music ==
Music in the miniseries is composed of Black musical genres: gospel, blues, and spirituals. Most is performed by Black artists or groups, with the theme song "Come On Children, Let's Sing", a gospel song, sung by Mahalia Jackson. Songs featured in the series include:

- Episode 1
1. The Zion Travelers, "Am I a Soldier of the Lord?"
2. Elmore James, "Shake Your Money Maker"
3. The Zion Travelers, "The Blood"
4. Mahalia Jackson, "I'm On My Way to Canaan"
- Episode 2
1. Nina Simone, "I Shall Be Released"
2. Shuggie Otis, "Sweet Thang"
- Episode 3
1. Brother Joe May and the Bye & Bye, "Afterwhile"
2. Shuggie Otis, "Sweet Thang"
3. The Redemption Harmonizers, "Amazing Grace"
- Episode 4
1. Elvis Presley, "Where Could I Go but to the Lord"
2. Taj Mahal, "She Caught the Katy and Left Me the Mule to Ride"
- Episode 5
1. The Ragged Jubilee, "In the Valley II"
2. Joe and Eddie and the Les Braxter Chorus, "Michael, Row the Boat Ashore"
- Episode 6
1. Mahalia Jackson, "Trouble of the World"
- Episode 7
1. Spirit of Memphis Quartet, "Walking with Jesus"
2. Cast, "Wayfaring Stranger"

== Production ==
=== Development ===
Ethan Hawke and Jason Blum adapted the 2013 novel, The Good Lord Bird, for a limited series that premiered on October 4, 2020, on Showtime. The series was created and executive produced by Hawke and Mark Richard. Jason Blum, via Blumhouse Television, served as a production partner on the miniseries. Albert Hughes, Kevin Hooks, Darnell Martin, and Haifaa al-Mansour, Michael Nankin, and Kate Woods each directed an episode.

=== Casting ===
In August 2019, Daveed Diggs and Wyatt Russell signed on to portray Frederick Douglass and First Lieutenant J. E. B. Stuart. In July 2019, Joshua Caleb Johnson and Rafael Casal joined the cast as Henry "Onion" Shackleford and John Cook.

=== Filming ===
Principal photography for the series began in July 2019, in Powhatan, Virginia, near Richmond.

== Reception ==
=== Critical response ===
For the series, review aggregator Rotten Tomatoes reported an approval rating of 98% based on 52 reviews, with an average rating of 8.5/10. The website's critics consensus reads, "Ethan Hawke dazzles in The Good Lord Bird, an epically irreverent adaptation that does right by its source material's good word." On Metacritic, the series has a weighted average score of 84 out of 100 based on reviews from 25 critics, indicating "universal acclaim".

In response to John Lahr's profile of Ethan Hawke, The New Yorker published a letter to the editor, written by Marty Brown, a descendant of John Brown. In the letter, Marty Brown welcomes the effort to bring John Brown's story to a wider audience but notes that his characterization in the series does not reflect the work of Brown's historians and biographers.

=== Accolades ===
Year	Award	Category	Nominees	Result	Ref.
2021	Critics' Choice Television Awards	Best Supporting Actor in a Limited Series or TV Movie	Daveed Diggs	Nominated	
2021	Critics' Choice Television Awards	Best Supporting Actor in a Limited Series or TV Movie	Joshua Caleb Johnson	Nominated	
2021	Golden Globe Awards	Best Actor – Limited Series or Television Film	Ethan Hawke	Nominated	
2021	Gotham Awards	Breakthrough Series – Long Format	The Good Lord Bird	Nominated	
2021	Gotham Awards	Outstanding Performance in a New Series	Ethan Hawke	Won	
2021	NAACP Image Awards	Outstanding Writing in a Drama Series	Erika L. Johnson & Mark Richard (for "A Wicked Plot")	Nominated	
2021	Peabody Awards	Entertainment honorees	Showtime Presents Blumhouse Television, Mark 924 Entertainment, Under the Influence Productions	Won	
2021	Primetime Emmy Awards	Outstanding Main Title Design	Efrain Montanez, Eduardo Guisandes, and Abigail Fairfax	Won	
2021	Satellite Awards	Best Miniseries & Limited Series	The Good Lord Bird	Won	
2021	Satellite Awards	Best Actor in a Miniseries or TV Film	Ethan Hawke	Won	
2021	Satellite Awards	Best Supporting Actor in a Series, Miniseries or Television Film	Joshua Caleb Johnson	Nominated	
2021	Screen Actors Guild Awards	Outstanding Performance by a Male Actor in a Television Movie or Limited Series	Ethan Hawke	Nominated	
2021	Television Critics Association Awards	Outstanding Achievement in Movies, Miniseries and Specials	The Good Lord Bird	Nominated	
2021	Television Critics Association Awards	Individual Achievement in Drama	Ethan Hawke	Nominated	
2021	Writers Guild of America Awards	Long Form – Adapted	Jeff Augustin, Ethan Hawke, Erika L. Johnson, Mark Richard, Kristen SaBerre, and Lauren Signorino; Based on the novel by James McBride	Nominated	
