= Damson Idris =

British actor (born 1991)

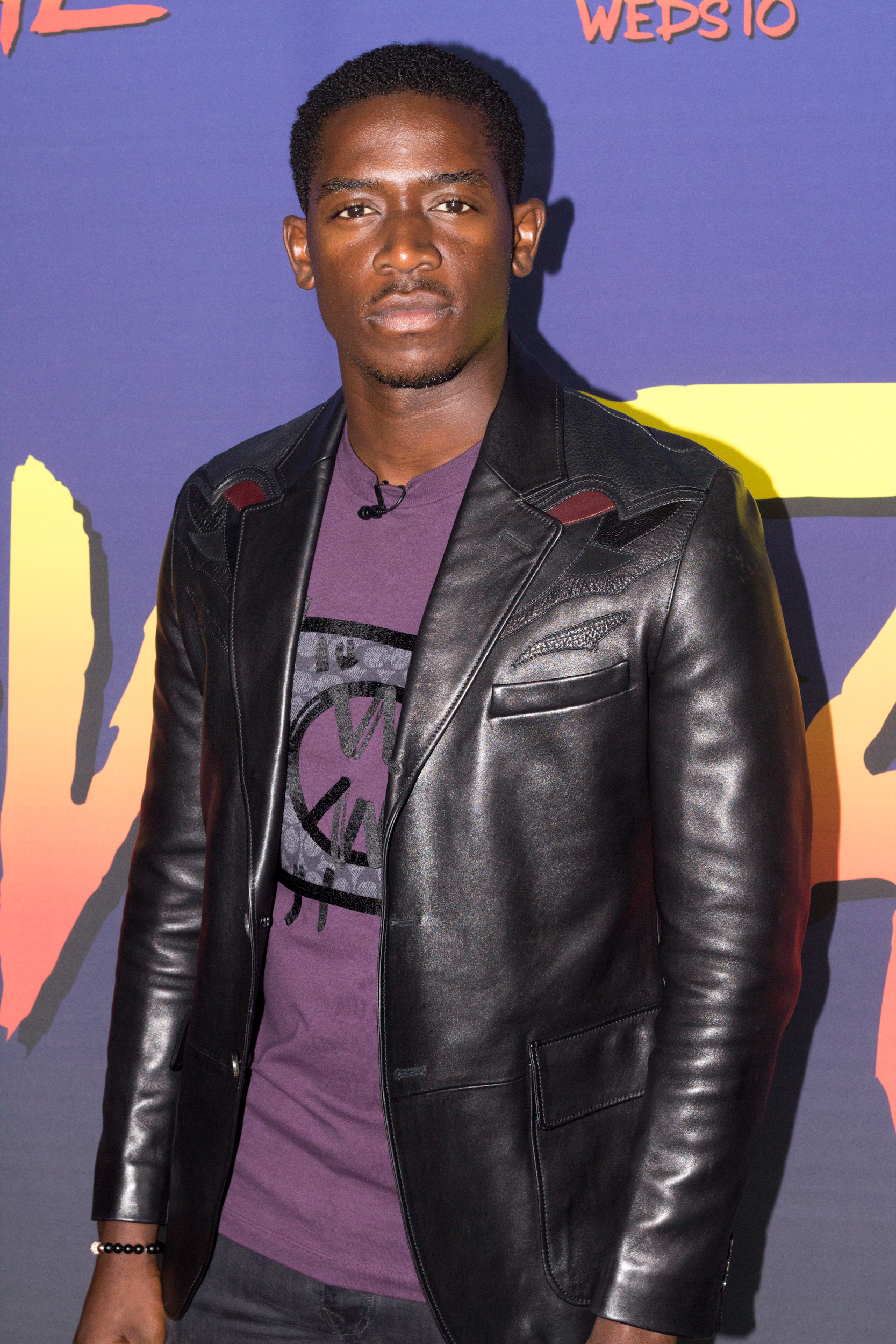
- Idris in 2019
- Born: Adamson Alade-Bo Idris; 2 September 1991 (age 35); London, England
- Education: Brunel University London
- Occupations: Actor; entrepreneur; film producer
- Years active: 2012–present

Adamson Alade-Bo "Damson" Idris (born 2 September 1991) is a British actor, entrepreneur and film producer. He began his career in theatre. He is best known for playing Franklin Saint in the FX crime drama Snowfall (2017–2023) and Joshua Pearce in Joseph Kosinski's sports film F1.

== Early life ==
Idris was born in Peckham, South East London, to a Nigerian family of Yoruba origin. He is the youngest of six children. His mother Philippa is an entrepreneur. He was named Adamson after his grandfather, Adam Alade Idris. Idris played football and dreamed of being "the next Lionel Messi." He also played rugby, and in 2002, shook the hand of Queen Elizabeth II when his team took part in her Golden Jubilee.

Idris studied drama at Brunel University London. He completed a BA Honours degree in Theatre, Film & Television studies. He later received an Alumni Award for Outstanding Contribution to Culture and Creativity from the university in 2024. After graduating, Idris continued his training at Identity School of Acting in London alongside John Boyega, Letitia Wright, and Malachi Kirby.

== Career ==
At Brunel, Idris met actress Cathy Tyson, who encouraged him to meet Ade Solanke and audition for a part in her play, Pandora's Box. He got the role, signed with an agent and began performing in more plays. After performing at the Royal National Theatre in London, Idris decided to pursue television and film roles. He also had several parts on British series including Miranda (2013), Doctors (2015) and Casualty (2015).

Idris's portrayed the role of Franklin Saint, an ambitious 19-year-old drug dealer in Los Angeles, in the FX crime drama Snowfall, which debuted in July 2017. The first season of Snowfall — set in 1983 as The United States is on the verge of the crack cocaine epidemic — weaves together the stories of several characters whose lives collide because of drugs. Idris auditioned through video in London before flying to Los Angeles, where he spent the day with John Singleton, who wanted to ensure Idris had mastery of the accent. To practice his American accent he worked with rapper WC, who tutored him on mannerisms specific to South Central Los Angeles. Idris earned strong reviews for his performance; Malcolm Venable of TV Guide called him "nothing short of captivating." The second series of Snowfall, set in 1984, premiered in July 2018.

Idris had his first film role in 2016 in the British thriller City of Tiny Lights, starring Riz Ahmed. In 2017, he made his American film debut in Megan Leavey alongside Kate Mara, who plays the title character in the eponymous war film. Idris also plays an FBI agent in the 2018 film The Commuter with Liam Neeson; and starred in Farming, a semi-autobiographical story of Nigerian-British actor Adewale Akinnuoye-Agbaje, who directed the film. Idris plays the character based on Akinnuoye-Agbaje, who was adopted by a white family in the United Kingdom, while Kate Beckinsale portrays his strict foster mother. In 2019, Idris won the Award for Best Actor in a British Film at the Edinburgh Film Festival for his portrayal. He also appears in "Smithereens", the second episode of the fifth season of the anthology series Black Mirror.

In May 2017, Idris won the "Emerging Talent Award" at the 12th Screen Nation Film and Television Awards in London.

In 2021, Idris co-starred in Netflix's sci-fi action film Outside the Wire. In 2023, he became a brand ambassador for Tommy Hilfiger's menswear. Idris has featured in several brand campaigns for Prada as their brand ambassador In 2025, he starred in F1, a film related to Formula One racing. The film would later go on to be nominated for the Academy Award for Best Picture. He was later appointed as the global brand ambassador for the sport in the following year. In January 2025, it was announced that Idris would be joining Thuso Mbedu, Amandla Stenberg, and Tosin Cole in the feature Children of Blood and Bone. On 12 May 2025, it was announced that Idris will star alongside Anamaria Vartolomei in the upcoming film Miles & Juliette, directed by Bill Pohlad.

In 2025, Idris launched DIDRIS, a fine jewelry brand. He debuted the line at the 2025 Met Gala and has said it was inspired by his mother, Silifat Idris.

== Personal life ==
Idris began dating Lori Harvey in 2022. News broke that the pair had broken up in November 2023, but they were spotted frequently after the reports surfaced. The two got back together in 2025 before splitting up again in April 2026.

== Filmography ==
=== Film ===
Key
†	Denotes films that have not yet been released

Year	Title	Role	Notes
2016	City of Tiny Lights	Hakim	
2017	Megan Leavey	Michael Forman	
2018	The Commuter	Agent Denys	
2018	Astral	Jordan	
2018	Farming	Enitan	
2021	Outside the Wire	Lt. Thomas Harp	
2025	F1	Joshua Pearce	
2027	Children of Blood and Bone †	Prince Inan	Post-production
TBA	Miles & Juliette †	Miles Davis	Filming

=== Television ===
Year	Title	Role	Notes
2013	Miranda	Commuter	Episode: "A Brief Encounter"
2015	Casualty	Leon James	Episode: "Heart Over Head"
2015	Doctors	Krispin Northcote	Episode: "Surrogate Dad"
2017–2023	Snowfall	Franklin Saint	Main cast
2019	The Twilight Zone	Dorian Harrison	Episode: "Replay"
2019	Black Mirror	Jaden Tommins	Episode: "Smithereens"
2023	Swarm	Khalid	Episode: "Stung"

=== Theatre ===
Year	Title	Role	Theatre	Playwright
2012	Khadija Is 18	Sam	Finborough Theatre	Shamser Sinha
2012	Pandora's Box	Tope	Arcola Theatre	Ade Solanke
2013	Ghost Town	Joe	Pilot Theatre	Jessica Fisher
2013	The DugOut	Leo	Tobacco Factory Theatre	Amanda Whittington
2014	Hotel	Other	Royal National Theatre	Polly Stenham

=== Video game ===
Year	Title	Role	Notes
2026	Squadron 42	Marcus Corell	

== Awards and nominations ==
Year	Award	Category	Nominated work	Result	Ref.
2017	Screen Nation Film and Television Awards	Emerging Talent Award	—N/a	Won	
2019	Edinburgh International Film Festival	Best Performance in a British Feature Film	Farming	Won	
2021	MOBO Awards	Best Performance in a TV Show/Film	Snowfall	Nominated	
2021	BET Awards	Best Actor	Snowfall	Nominated	
2022	NAACP Image Awards	Outstanding Actor in a Drama Series	Snowfall	Nominated	
2022	BET Awards	Best Actor	Snowfall	Nominated	
2023	NAACP Image Awards	Outstanding Actor in a Drama Series	Snowfall	Nominated	
2023	BET Awards	Best Actor	Snowfall	Won	
2023	Celebration of Cinema and Television	Actor (TV)	Snowfall	Won	
2024	Black Reel Awards	Outstanding Lead Performance in a Drama Series	Snowfall	Won	
2024	MOBO Awards	Best Performance in a TV Show/Film	Snowfall	Won	
2024	BET Awards	Best Actor	Snowfall	Nominated	
2024	NAACP Image Awards	Outstanding Actor in a Drama Series	Snowfall	Won	
2024	NAACP Image Awards	Outstanding Supporting Actor in a Television Movie, Limited-Series or Dramatic Special	Swarm	Nominated	
2025	Celebration of Cinema and Television	Supporting Actor Award (Film)	F1	Won	
2026	African-American Film Critics Association	Best Supporting Actor	F1	Won	
2026	BET Awards	Best Actor	F1	Nominated	
2026	Black Reel Awards	Best Breakthrough Performance	F1	Nominated	
2026	Black Reel Awards	Outstanding Supporting Performance	F1	Nominated	
2026	Image Awards	Outstanding Supporting Performance in a Motion Picture	F1	Nominated	
