= Farming (film) =

- Directed by: Adewale Akinnuoye-Agbaje
- Written by: Adewale Akinnuoye-Agbaje
- Produced by: Michael London; Janice Williams; François Ivernel; Miranda Ballesteros; Andrew Levitas
- Starring: Damson Idris; Kate Beckinsale; John Dagleish; Jamie Winstone; Genevieve Nnaji; Gugu Mbatha-Raw
- Cinematography: Kit Fraser
- Edited by: Tariq Anwar
- Music by: Ilan Eshkeri
- Production companies: Metalwork Pictures; Logical Pictures; HanWay Films; Montebello Productions; Groundswell Productions; AAA Studios
- Distributed by: Lionsgate
- Release dates: 8 September 2018 (TIFF); 11 October 2019 (United Kingdom)
- Running time: 102 minutes
- Country: United Kingdom
- Language: English

Farming is a 2018 British drama film written and directed by Adewale Akinnuoye-Agbaje in his directorial debut, based on his own childhood. The plot is about a child whose Yorùbá parents gave him to a white working-class family in London in the 1980s, and who grows up to join a white skinhead gang.

The film, which stars Damson Idris, Kate Beckinsale, John Dagleish, Jaime Winstone, Genevieve Nnaji, and Gugu Mbatha-Raw, wrapped production in 2017. It premiered at the 2018 Toronto International Film Festival on 8 September and won the Michael Powell Award at the 2019 Edinburgh Film Festival. The film was released by Lionsgate on 11 October 2019 in the UK and by eOne on 25 October 2019 in the US.

== Plot ==
In 1967 Nigeria, Enitan is born to Nigerian parents who send him to Britain as part of a widespread practice called "farming," where Nigerian families place their children with white foster families in the hopes of a better life. Enitan's parents leave him in the care of Ingrid Carpenter, a strict foster mother in Tilbury, England. However, they frequently take him back to Nigeria for visits, leading to confusion and abandonment issues.

As a young boy, Enitan struggles to fit in with both his foster family and his peers. He faces racism and bullying at school, and his dark skin makes him a target for local white supremacists. Isolated and desperate for belonging, he begins to internalize the racist attitudes directed toward him. Ingrid, unable to fully understand his struggle, provides discipline but little emotional support, further alienating him.

As a teenager, Enitan falls under the influence of a violent skinhead gang led by Levi. Seeking acceptance, he joins their ranks, adopting their racist ideologies and turning against his own identity. Enitan becomes deeply involved in their violent activities, which include terrorizing immigrants and other minorities in the neighborhood. His actions shock Ingrid, who is torn between protecting him and confronting his destructive path.

Enitan's descent into self-hatred and violence reaches a breaking point when he faces arrest after a brutal attack. A compassionate teacher, Ms. Dapo, intervenes and introduces him to a Nigerian community leader who encourages him to reconnect with his heritage. Despite his initial resistance, Enitan begins to reflect on his identity and the pain he has caused.

Struggling to leave the gang, Enitan faces violent retribution from Levi and his followers. With Ingrid's help, he seeks redemption by embracing his Nigerian roots and confronting the traumas of his past. Enitan ultimately finds solace in his cultural identity and begins to repair his fractured relationship with Ingrid.

The film ends with Enitan attending a Nigerian cultural event, signifying his journey toward self-acceptance and healing. A final epilogue reveals that Farming is based on the true story of Adewale Akinnuoye-Agbaje, who went on to become a successful actor and filmmaker, using his experiences to inspire others.

== Cast ==
- Damson Idris as Enitan
- Kate Beckinsale as Ingrid Carpenter
- Adewale Akinnuoye-Agbaje as Femi
- John Dagleish as Levi
- Jaime Winstone as Lynn
- Genevieve Nnaji as Tolu
- Gugu Mbatha-Raw as Ms. Dapo
- Cosmo Jarvis as Jonesy
- Ann Mitchell as Hilda
- Tom Canton as Bomber
- Theodore Barklem-Biggs as Scum
- Giorgi Gumberidze as Headmaster
- Amariah Nkwo as Madame
- Seun Shote as Mallam
- Jubilee Jonathan-Nwala as Yemi
- Michael Akinsulire as Nigerian Teacher
- Leke Adebayo as Alahgi
- Ademola Adedoyin as Paddy
- Adejola Adeyemi as Monday

== Release ==
Farming premiered at the 2018 Toronto International Film Festival on 8 September in the Discovery Section. The film won the Michael Powell Award at the 2019 Edinburgh Film Festival. On 17 September 2018, the film's distribution rights were purchased for several countries and regions: the United Kingdom, France, Benelux, Australia, New Zealand, Latin America, South Korea, China, Greece, Portugal, Serbia, Montenegro, Singapore, the Middle East, and Turkey. Lionsgate UK released the film in the United Kingdom on 11 October 2019, followed by a United States release on 25 October.

== Production ==
Production visited two Kent locations in Farming. At the first, The Historic Dockyard Chatham, various areas such as at The Joiner’s Shop, House Carpenters Shop, and the rear of The Smithery, Ropery and Anchor Wharf were used. Production also visited a jewellery shop in Gillingham for some further scenes.

== Reception ==
The review aggregation website Rotten Tomatoes reported a 56% approval rating based on 32 reviews, with an average score of 5.8/10. On Metacritic, the film has a weighted average of 51 out of 100, based on 9 critics, indicating "mixed or average" reviews. Screen Daily wrote of the film, “Actor turned director Adewale Akinnuoye-Agbaje makes an arresting feature debut with Farming. Told with raw emotion and lurid violence, it transforms elements of his life story into a disturbing, eye-opening coming of age drama.”

== See also ==
- List of black films of the 2010s
