= BET Award for Best Actor =

American entertainment award category

BET Awards for Best Actor
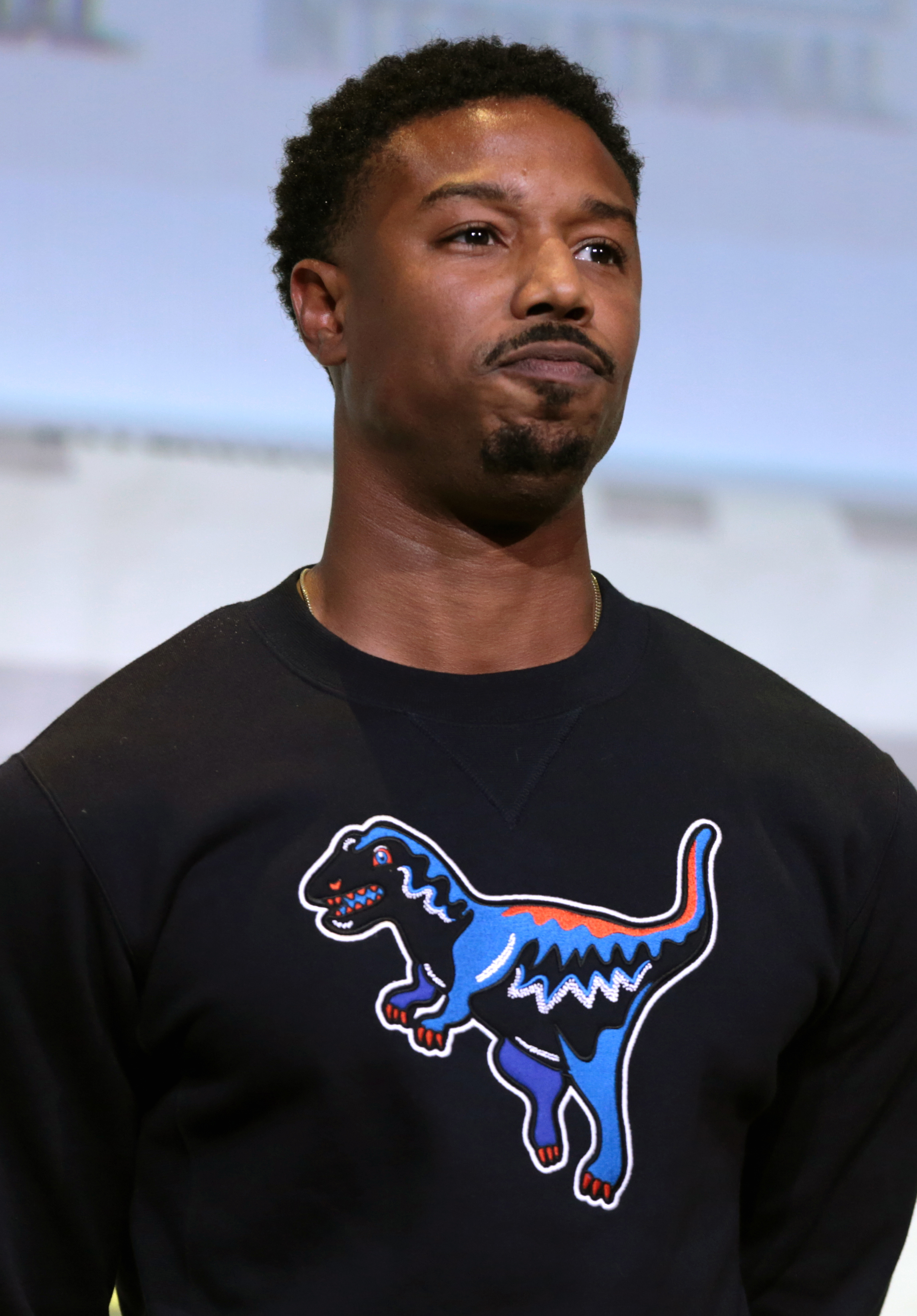
- Michael B. Jordan is the most recent recipient
- Country: United States
- Presented by: BET Awards
- First award: 2001
- Currently held by: Michael B. Jordan (2026)

Highlights
- Most wins: Denzel Washington (5)
- Most nominations: Denzel Washington (15)

The BET Award for Best Actor is awarded to actors from both television and film. Some nominees have been nominated based on their performances in multiple bodies of work within the eligibility period. Denzel Washington holds the record for most wins in this category with four.

== Winners and nominees ==
Winners are listed first and highlighted in bold.

=== 2000s ===
Year	Actor	Work	Ref
2001
2001	**Denzel Washington**	**Remember the Titans**	
2001	Omar Epps	Love & Basketball	
2001	Cuba Gooding Jr.	Men of Honor	
2001	Samuel L. Jackson	Rules of Engagement	
2002
2002	**Will Smith**	Ali	
2002	Morgan Freeman	High Crimes	
2002	Eddie Murphy	Shrek, Dr. Dolittle 2 and Showtime	
2002	Chris Tucker	Rush Hour 2	
2002	Denzel Washington	Training Day and John Q.	
2003
2003	**Derek Luke**	**Antwone Fisher**	
2003	Nick Cannon	Drumline	
2003	Mos Def	Brown Sugar	
2003	Samuel L. Jackson	XXX and Star Wars: Episode II – Attack of the Clones	
2003	Denzel Washington	Antwone Fisher	
2004
2004	**Denzel Washington**	**Out of Time**	
2004	Mos Def	The Italian Job	
2004	Laurence Fishburne	Mystic River, The Matrix Reloaded and The Matrix Revolutions	
2004	Morgan Freeman	Bruce Almighty	
2004	Samuel L. Jackson	S.W.A.T.	
2004	Bernie Mac	Bad Santa, Charlie's Angels: Full Throttle and The Bernie Mac Show	
2005
2005	**Jamie Foxx**	**Ray, Collateral and Breakin' All the Rules**	
2005	Don Cheadle	Ocean's Twelve, Hotel Rwanda and After the Sunset	
2005	Morgan Freeman	Million Dollar Baby	
2005	Samuel L. Jackson	The Incredibles and Coach Carter	
2005	Will Smith	I, Robot, Shark Tale and Hitch	
2006
2006	**Terrence Howard**	**Crash, Four Brothers, Get Rich or Die Tryin', Lackawanna Blues and Hustle & Flow**	
2006	Don Cheadle	Crash	
2006	Jamie Foxx	Stealth and Miami Vice	
2006	Ludacris	Crash and Hustle & Flow	
2006	Denzel Washington	Inside Man	
2007
2007	**Forest Whitaker**	**The Last King of Scotland**	
2007	Idris Elba	Daddy's Little Girls	
2007	Jamie Foxx	Dreamgirls	
2007	Eddie Murphy	Norbit and Dreamgirls	
2007	Will Smith	The Pursuit of Happyness	
2008
2008	**Denzel Washington**	**American Gangster and The Great Debaters**	
2008	Anthony Anderson	Transformers and K-Ville	
2008	Don Cheadle	Ocean's Thirteen and Talk to Me	
2008	Idris Elba	American Gangster, This Christmas and 28 Weeks Later	
2008	Terrence Howard	The Brave One and The Perfect Holiday	
2009
2009	**Will Smith**	**Hancock and Seven Pounds**	
2009	Common	Wanted and Street Kings	
2009	Idris Elba	RocknRolla and The Unborn	
2009	Samuel L. Jackson	Lakeview Terrace and Soul Men	
2009	Jamal Woolard	Notorious	

=== 2010s ===
Year	Actor	Work	Ref
2010
2010	**Idris Elba**	**The Losers**	
2010	Quinton Aaron	The Blind Side	
2010	Don Cheadle	Brooklyn's Finest	
2010	Jamie Foxx	Law Abiding Citizen	
2010	Denzel Washington	The Taking of Pelham 123	
2011
2011	**Idris Elba**	**Takers and Luther**	
2011	Laz Alonso	Jumping the Broom	
2011	Chris Brown	Takers	
2011	Don Cheadle	Iron Man 2	
2011	Jamie Foxx	Due Date	
2012
2012	**Kevin Hart**	**Kevin Hart: Laugh at My Pain**	
2012	Don Cheadle	House of Lies and The Guard	
2012	Common	New Year's Eve and Hell on Wheels	
2012	Idris Elba	Thor, Ghost Rider: Spirit of Vengeance and Luther	
2012	Denzel Washington	Safe House	
2013
2013	**Jamie Foxx**	**Django Unchained**	
2013	Don Cheadle	House of Lies and Flight	
2013	Common	Hell on Wheels, LUV and The Odd Life of Timothy Green	
2013	Samuel L. Jackson	Django Unchained and The Avengers	
2013	Denzel Washington	Flight	
2014
2014	**Chiwetel Ejiofor**	**12 Years a Slave**	
2014	Idris Elba	Mandela: Long Walk to Freedom and Thor: The Dark World	
2014	Kevin Hart	Ride Along, Real Husbands of Hollywood and About Last Night	
2014	Michael B. Jordan	Fruitvale Station	
2014	Forest Whitaker	The Butler	
2015
2015	**Terrence Howard**	**Empire, Lullaby, St. Vincent and Sabotage**	
2015	Anthony Anderson	Black-ish	
2015	Idris Elba	Luther and No Good Deed	
2015	Kevin Hart	The Wedding Ringer, Think Like a Man Too, Real Husbands of Hollywood and Top Five	
2015	Jussie Smollett	Empire	
2016
2016	**Michael B. Jordan**	**Fantastic Four and Creed**	
2016	Anthony Anderson	Black-ish	
2016	Idris Elba	Zootopia, Beasts of No Nation and Luther	
2016	O'Shea Jackson Jr.	Straight Outta Compton	
2016	Courtney B. Vance	American Crime Story	
2017
2017	**Mahershala Ali**	**Luke Cage, Free State of Jones, Kicks, Hidden Figures and Moonlight**	
2017	Donald Glover	Atlanta	
2017	Bryshere Y. Gray	Empire and The New Edition Story	
2017	Omari Hardwick	Power	
2017	Denzel Washington	Fences and The Magnificent Seven	
2018
2018	**Chadwick Boseman**	**Black Panther and Marshall**	
2018	Denzel Washington	Roman J. Israel, Esq.	
2018	Sterling K. Brown	Marshall, This Is Us, and Black Panther	
2018	Michael B. Jordan	Black Panther	
2018	Daniel Kaluuya	Get Out and Black Panther	
2018	Donald Glover	Atlanta and Spider-Man: Homecoming	
2019
2019	**Michael B. Jordan**	**Creed II**	
2019	Anthony Anderson	Black-ish	
2019	Chadwick Boseman	Avengers: Infinity War and Avengers: Endgame	
2019	Denzel Washington	The Equalizer 2	
2019	Mahershala Ali	Green Book	
2019	Omari Hardwick	Power	

=== 2020s ===
Year	Actor	Work	Ref
2020
2020	**Michael B. Jordan**	**Just Mercy**	
2020	Billy Porter	Pose	
2020	Eddie Murphy	Dolemite Is My Name	
2020	Forest Whitaker	Finding Steve McQueen and Godfather of Harlem	
2020	Jamie Foxx	Just Mercy	
2020	Omari Hardwick	Power	
2021
2021	**Chadwick Boseman (Posthumous)**	**Da 5 Bloods** and **Ma Rainey's Black Bottom**	
2021	Aldis Hodge	One Night in Miami...	
2021	Damson Idris	Snowfall	
2021	Daniel Kaluuya	Judas and the Black Messiah	
2021	Eddie Murphy	Coming 2 America	
2021	LaKeith Stanfield	Judas and the Black Messiah	
2022
2022	**Will Smith**	**King Richard**	
2022	Adrian Holmes	Bel-Air	
2022	Anthony Anderson	Black-ish	
2022	Damson Idris	Snowfall	
2022	Denzel Washington	The Tragedy of Macbeth	
2022	Forest Whitaker	Godfather of Harlem	
2022	Jabari Banks	Bel-Air	
2022	Sterling K. Brown	This Is Us	
2023
2023	**Damson Idris**	**Snowfall**	
2023	Amin Joseph	Snowfall	
2023	Brian Tyree Henry	Atlanta, Bullet Train, Causeway	
2023	Daniel Kaluuya	Nope	
2023	Demetrius Flenory Jr.	BMF	
2023	Donald Glover	Atlanta	
2023	Michael B. Jordan	Creed III	
2024
2024	**Denzel Washington**	**The Equalizer 3**	
2024	Anthony Mackie	If You Were the Last, Twisted Metal, We Have a Ghost	
2024	Colman Domingo	Euphoria, Fear the Walking Dead, Rustin, Sing Sing and The Color Purple	
2024	Damson Idris	Snowfall	
2024	Donald Glover	Mr. & Mrs. Smith	
2024	Idris Elba	Hijack, Luther: The Fallen Sun	
2024	Jeffrey Wright	Asteroid City, Atrabilious, American Fiction and Rustin	
2024	LaKeith Stanfield	The Changeling, Haunted Mansion and The Book of Clarence	

== Multiple wins and nominations ==
=== Wins ===
5 wins

- Denzel Washington

4 wins

- Michael B. Jordan

3 wins

- Will Smith

2 wins

- Chadwick Boseman
- Idris Elba
- Jamie Foxx
- Terrence Howard

=== Nominations ===
16 nominations

- Denzel Washington

10 nominations

- Idris Elba

8 nominations

- Jamie Foxx

7 nominations

- Don Cheadle
- Michael B. Jordan

6 nominations

- Samuel L. Jackson

5 nominations

- Anthony Anderson
- Damson Idris
- Forest Whitaker
- Will Smith

4 nominations

- Sterling K. Brown
- Donald Glover
- Eddie Murphy
- Kevin Hart

3 nominations

- Chadwick Boseman
- Common
- Colman Domingo
- Morgan Freeman
- Omari Hardwick
- Terrence Howard
- Daniel Kaluuya
- Anthony Mackie

2 nominations

- Mos Def
- Aaron Pierre
- LaKeith Stanfield

== See also ==
- BET Award for Best Actress
