= Hubert Point-Du Jour =

American actor

Hubert Point-Du Jour is an American actor. He played Bob in the 2020 Showtime miniseries The Good Lord Bird. He also played Miles in the 2023 Peacock series The Continental: From the World of John Wick. He also has the recurring role as Josh Baker in the Peacock series Dr. Death. He also played Ralph Abernathy in the fourth season of Genius.

== Filmography ==
=== Film ===
Year	Title	Role	Notes
2013	Mother of George	Tony	
2015	James White	EMT #1	
2015	Sweep	Benoit	Short film
2017	Where Is Kyra?	Telephone Employee	Uncredited
2017	Trouble	Dr. Adunbi	
2019	Windows on the World	Nik	
TBA	Miles & Juliette	John Coltrane	Filming

=== Television ===
Year	Title	Role	Notes
2005	University Place	Alex	TV movie
2010	Law & Order	P.O. Chris Owen	1 episode
2011	Black Jack	BJ	TV movie
2013	Over/Under	Jamal	TV movie
2014	Law & Order: Special Victims Unit	Berko Barre	1 episode
2015	The Good Wife	Protestor Jake	1 episode
2015	Happyish	Businessman #2	2 episodes
2017	The Path	Samuel	1 episode
2018	Blindspot	Akoi Salih	1 episode
2018	Elementary	Jaylen Thomas	1 episode
2018	Madam Secretary	Dany Victor	1 episode
2019	Great Performances	Don John	1 episode
2019	Masters of Doom	Chris Howell	TV movie
2020	The Good Lord Bird	Bob	Miniseries
2021	City on a Hill	Kamal Kalil	2 episodes
2021	Dr. Death	Josh Baker	4 episodes
2023	The Continental: From the World of John Wick	Miles	3 episodes
2024	Genius	Ralph Abernathy	8 episodes
