= The Heaven & Earth Grocery Store =

2023 novel by James McBride

- Author: James McBride
- Language: English
- Publisher: Penguin Random House
- Publication date: 2023
- Publication place: United States
- Pages: 400 pp
- ISBN: 9780593422946

The Heaven & Earth Grocery Store is a novel by American writer James McBride. It was released in 2023 to critical success. The novel tells the story of Black and Jewish residents of the Chicken Hill neighborhood of Pottstown, Pennsylvania, in the 1920s and '30s.

The novel has been nominated for or won a variety of awards, many of them American, and spanning a wide range of categories from historical fiction to historical mystery. Notably, it won the Kirkus Prize.

== Narrative ==
The book opens in 1972, in the town of Pottstown, Pennsylvania, where an excavation operation for a new housing complex inadvertently discovers a skeleton in the bottom of a well. Some items are found near the body, including a mezuza, which leads policeman to question the town's only Jewish resident, Malachi, who is living in a disused synagogue. But the investigation is hampered when the crime scene is washed away by Hurricane Agnes. The novel then goes back to 1920s and '30s Pottstown and details the lives of the town's residents in the mostly Black and Jewish Chicken Hill neighborhood. Two of the Jewish residents, husband and wife Moshe and Chona Ludlow, own a local theater with a dance hall and a grocery store (The Heaven & Earth Grocery Store). One of the town's Black residents (who works for the Ludlows), Nate Timblin, asks the Ludlows to hide a young Black boy who is deaf, named Dodo, from the authorities who are seeking to institutionalize him in the Pennhurst State School and Hospital, a notorious mental asylum. The town's physician, also a member of the Ku Klux Klan, has racist and xenophobic motives and is favored by many of the white residents of the town in such policies. The Black and Jewish townspeople eventually mobilize to help the boy.

== Reception ==
Danez Smith, writing for The New York Times, commended McBride's depiction of how divisions can occur along racial lines even in close knit communities, stating: "By showcasing neighbors misunderstanding neighbors, McBride shines a light on how communities in America are at times walled apart by difference, even in intimate relationships". Smith concluded that the novel is a "charming, smart, heart-blistering and heart-healing novel". Writing for NPR, author Maureen Corrigan also welcomed McBride's ability to depict tensions that may arise between different races or classes of people, stating: "As he's done throughout his spectacular writing career, McBride looks squarely at savage truths about race and prejudice, but he also insists on humor and hope." Corrigan further stated: "The Heaven & Earth Grocery Store is one of the best novels I've read this year. It pulls off the singular magic trick of being simultaneously flattening and uplifting". Considering all of McBride's books in an article in The Atlantic, Ayana Mathis wrote: "Our current era of wrecking-ball polemics lends his oeuvre an air of wishfulness and, at the same time, makes the work that much more relevant". And it "just feels good—we are comforted and entertained, and braced for the hard lessons he also delivers". The New York Times named it one of the 100 Notable Books of 2023.

== Awards ==
Year	Award	Category	Result	Ref
2023	Barnes & Noble Book of the Year	—	Won	
2023	Goodreads Choice Awards	Historical Fiction	Nominated–4th	
2023	Kirkus Prize	Fiction	Won	
2023	National Jewish Book Award	Fiction	Won	
2024	Aspen Words Literary Prize	—	Shortlisted	
2024	Jewish Fiction Award	—	Won	
2024	Libby Book Award	Adult Fiction	Won	
2024	Macavity Award	Sue Feder Memorial Award (Historical Mystery)	Shortlisted	
2024	Mark Twain American Voice in Literature Award	—	Shortlisted	
2024	NAACP Image Award	Fiction	Shortlisted	
2024	Ohioana Book Award	Fiction	Won	
2024	PEN/Faulkner Award	—	Longlisted	
2024	Sophie Brody Medal	—	Won	
