= Miles & Juliette =

- Directed by: Bill Pohlad
- Screenplay by: Zora Howard
- Produced by: Mick Jagger; Bill Pohlad; Victoria Pearman
- Starring: Damson Idris; Anamaria Vartolomei; J. Alphonse Nicholson; Jay Reeves; Terrace Martin; Denny Love; Hubert Point-Du Jour
- Cinematography: Arnaud Potier
- Music by: Robert Glasper
- Production companies: River Road Entertainment; Jagged Films
- Country: United States
- Language: English

Miles & Juliette is an upcoming American period romance film directed by Bill Pohlad based on a screenplay written by Zora Howard. Starring Damson Idris and Anamaria Vartolomei, the film is about American jazz musician Miles Davis's 1949 trip to Paris where he met French singer-actress Juliette Gréco. Pohlad is co-producing the film alongside Mick Jagger and Victoria Pearman. No release date has been set publicly.

== Premise ==
Miles Davis travels to Paris, France where he meets and falls in love with French singer-actress Juliette Gréco "just before they became cultural legends".

== Cast ==
- Damson Idris as Miles Davis
- Anamaria Vartolomei as Juliette Gréco
- J. Alphonse Nicholson as Kenny "Klook" Clarke
- Jay Reeves as Tadd Dameron
- Terrace Martin as Charlie "Bird" Parker
- Denny Love as James Moody
- Lodric D. Collins as Max Roach
- Hubert Point-Du Jour as John Coltrane
- Raphael Trioli as colleague of the jazz club host

== Production ==
In May 2025 it was announced that Damson Idris and Anamaria Vartolomei was set to star in Miles & Juliette, with Bill Pohlad set to direct. The film is co-produced by Pohlad through his production company River Road Entertainment and Mick Jagger and Victoria Pearman through Jagger's Jagged Films. No release date has been announced but international sales were launched at the 2025 Cannes Film Festival.

Filming began in Paris on October 9, 2026, with new additions added to the cast.
