= James McBride (writer) =

American writer and musician (born 1957)

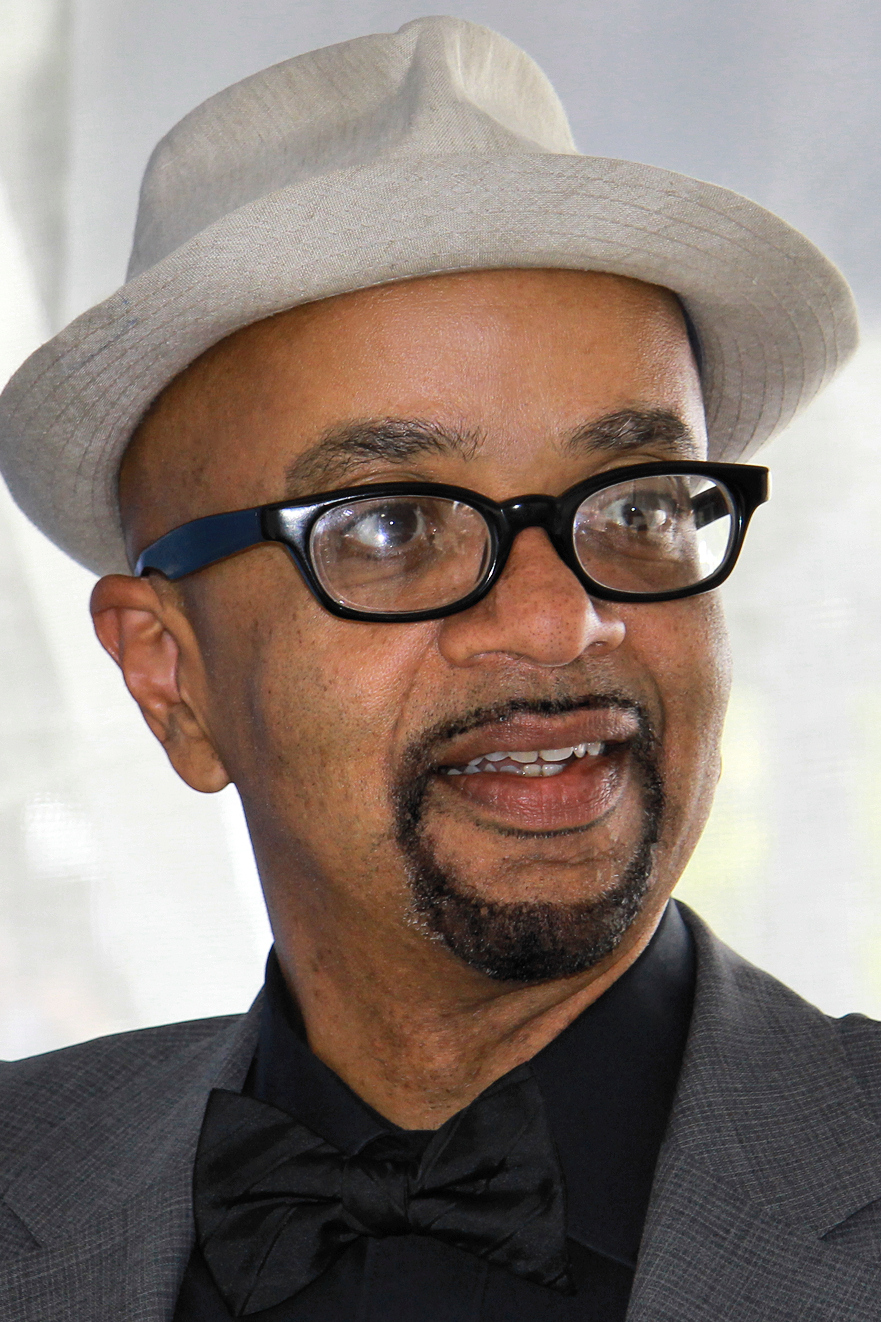
- McBride at the 2013 Texas Book Festival
- Born: September 11, 1957 (age 68); New York City, New York, United States
- Education: Oberlin College (BA); Columbia University (MA)
- Occupations: Writer and musician
- Children: 3
- Writing career
- Genres: Memoir, screenplay
- Notable works: The Color of Water The Good Lord Bird (National Book Award, 2013) The Heaven & Earth Grocery Store
- Notable awards: Anisfield-Wolf Book Award
- Website: jamesmcbride.com

Signature
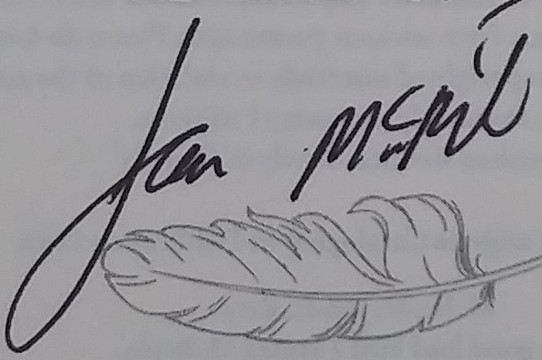

James McBride (born September 11, 1957) is an American writer and musician. He is the recipient of the 2013 National Book Award for Fiction for his novel The Good Lord Bird.

== Early life ==
McBride's father, Andrew D. McBride was African-American; he was a reverend and died of cancer at the age of 45. His mother, Ruchel Dwajra Zylska (name changed to Rachel Deborah Shilsky, and later to Ruth McBride Jordan), was a Jewish immigrant from Poland. James was raised in Brooklyn's Red Hook housing projects until he was seven years old and was the last child Ruth had from her first marriage, the last child of Andrew McBride, and the eighth of 12 children.

McBride has stated:

Technically I guess you could say I'm Jewish since my mother was Jewish...but she converted (to Christianity). So the question is for theologians to answer."

His memoir, The Color of Water: A Black Man's Tribute to His White Mother (1995), describes his family history and his relationship with his mother.

McBride graduated from Oberlin College in 1979, and received his journalism degree from Columbia University Graduate School of Journalism in 1980.

== Career ==
=== Writing ===
McBride is known for his 1995 bestselling memoir The Color of Water, which describes his life growing up in a large, poor American-African family led by an ethnically Jewish mother. His mother was the daughter of an Orthodox rabbi. During her first marriage, to McBride's father Andrew, she converted to Christianity and became a devout Christian. The memoir, which won an Anisfield-Wolf Book Award, spent more than two years on The New York Times Best Seller list. It is read in high schools and universities across America, has been translated into 16 languages, and sold more than 2.1 million copies.

In 2002, McBride published the novel Miracle at St. Anna, drawing on the history of the majority African-American 92nd Infantry Division in the Italian campaign from mid-1944 to April 1945. The book was adapted into the 2008 movie Miracle at St. Anna, directed by Spike Lee.

In 2005, McBride published first volume of The Process, a CD-based documentary about life as lived by low-profile jazz musicians.

His 2008 novel Song Yet Sung is about an enslaved woman with prophetic dreams, as well as a wide array of freed black people, other enslaved people, and white people whose lives come together during the last weeks of the woman's life. Harriet Tubman served as an inspiration for the book, which gives a fictional depiction of a code of communication that enslaved people used to help runaways attain freedom. The book, based on real events that occurred on Maryland's Eastern Shore, also features serial killer Patty Cannon as a villain.

In 2012, McBride co-wrote and co-produced Red Hook Summer (2012) with Spike Lee.

In July 2013, McBride co-authored Hard Listening (2013) with the rest of the Rock Bottom Remainders (published by Coliloquy).

In August 2013, his novel The Good Lord Bird was released by Riverhead Books. The work details the life of abolitionist John Brown. It won the 2013 National Book Award for Fiction.

On September 22, 2016, President Barack Obama awarded McBride the 2015 National Humanities Medal "for humanizing the complexities of discussing race in America."

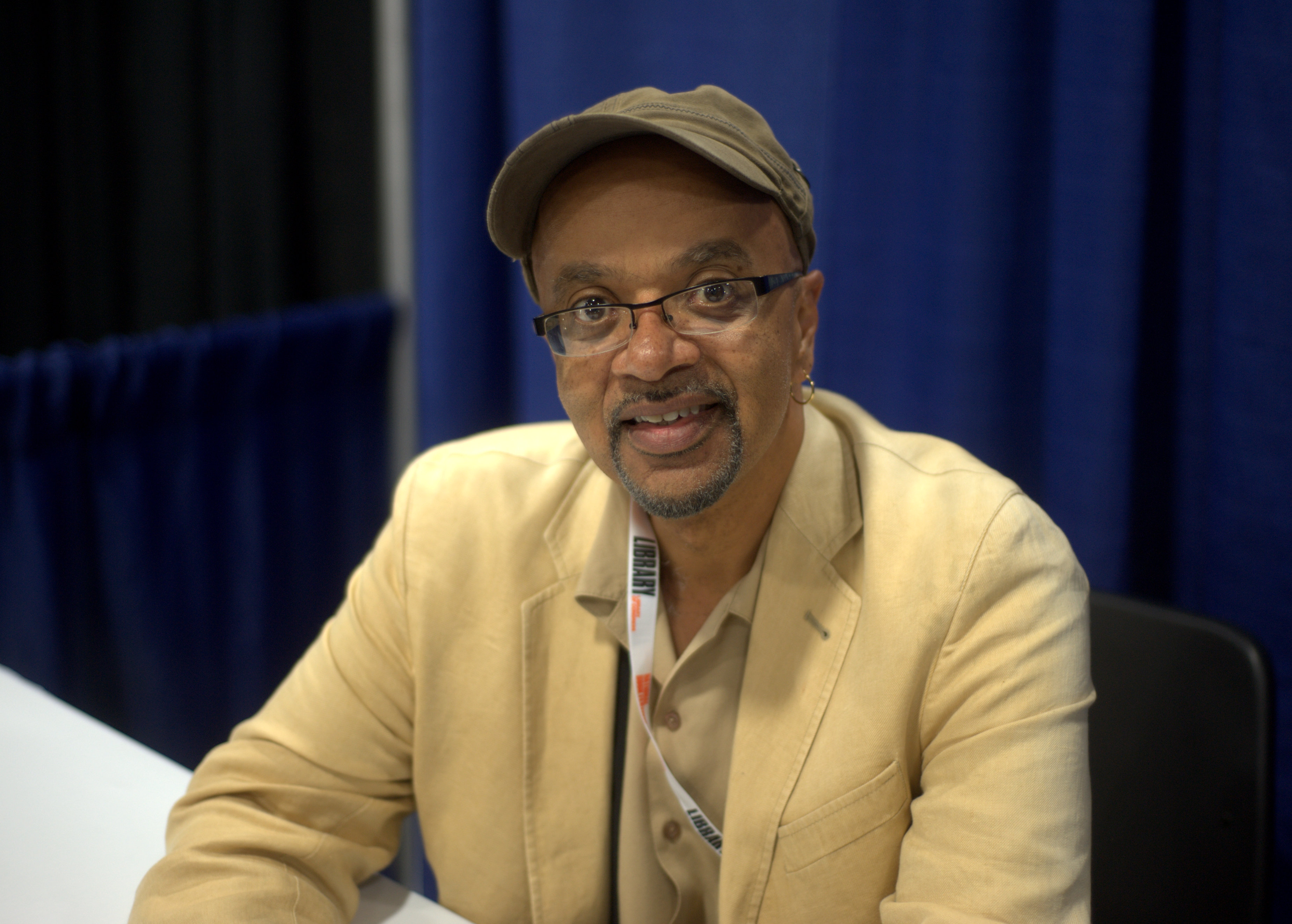
McBride in 2018

In December 2020, Emily Temple of Literary Hub reported that his novel Deacon King Kong had made 16 lists of the best books of 2020. In February 2021, it won the Andrew Carnegie Medal for Excellence in Fiction. Deacon King Kong also received the 2021 Anisfield-Wolf Book Award for fiction and was selected for Oprah's Book Club.

In 2023, he released The Heaven & Earth Grocery Store, about the intertwining lives of African-American, Jewish, immigrant, and white residents in Pottstown, Pennsylvania, largely taking place in the 1920s and '30s. The novel was named 2023 Book of the Year by both Amazon and Barnes & Noble. It was also awarded the Kirkus Prize for Fiction, the Association of Jewish Libraries' 2024 Jewish Fiction Award, and the 2024 Sophie Brody Award. In 2025, the novel was longlisted for the Dublin Literary Award.

On November 3, 2025, McBride was inducted Into the 2025 class of Library Lions by the New York Public Library.

McBride is a Distinguished Writer-in-Residence at New York University.

=== Music ===
McBride was the tenor saxophonist for the Rock Bottom Remainders, a group of musician-authors. He also toured as a saxophonist with jazz singer Jimmy Scott, and has written songs for Anita Baker, Grover Washington Jr., Pura Fé, and Gary Burton. McBride composed the theme music for the Clint Harding Network, Jonathan Demme's documentary Right to Return, and Ed Shockley's musical Bobos.

McBride was awarded the American Music Theater Festival's Stephen Sondheim Award in 1993, the American Academy of Arts and Letters' Richard Rodgers Awards for Musical Theater in 1996, and the inaugural ASCAP Richard Rodgers Horizons Award in 1996.

== Personal life ==
McBride has three children with his ex-wife and lives in New York City and Lambertville, New Jersey.

== Bibliography ==
- The Color of Water: A Black Man's Tribute to His White Mother (1995)
- Miracle at St. Anna (2002)
- Song Yet Sung (2008)
- The Good Lord Bird (2013)
- Kill 'Em and Leave: Searching for James Brown and the American Soul (2016)
- Five-Carat Soul (2017)
- Deacon King Kong (2020)
- The Heaven & Earth Grocery Store (2023)

== Filmography ==
- Miracle at St. Anna (2008)
- Red Hook Summer (2012)
- The Good Lord Bird (2020)
