= The Franchise (2024 TV series) =

HBO satirical comedy series

- Promotional poster
- Genre: Comedy; Satire
- Created by: Jon Brown
- Starring: Himesh Patel; Aya Cash; Jessica Hynes; Billy Magnussen; Lolly Adefope; Darren Goldstein; Isaac Powell; Richard E. Grant; Daniel Brühl
- Theme music composer: Trent Reznor; Atticus Ross
- Composer: Jeff Cardoni
- Countries of origin: United States; United Kingdom
- Original language: English
- No. of seasons: 1
- No. of episodes: 8

Production
- Executive producers: Armando Iannucci; Sam Mendes; Pippa Harris; Jon Brown; Marina Hyde; Keith Akushie; Nicolas Brown; Julie Pastor; Tony Roche; Jim Kleverweis
- Producers: Juli Weiner; Dillon Mapletoft; Dean O'Toole
- Cinematography: Carl Herse
- Running time: 27–29 minutes
- Production companies: Neal Street Productions; Dundee Productions

Original release
- Network: HBO
- Release: October 6 – November 24, 2024

The Franchise is a 2024 satirical comedy television series created by Jon Brown, and executive produced by Brown, Armando Iannucci and Sam Mendes. The series premiered on HBO on October 6, 2024. In January 2025, the series was canceled after one season.

== Premise ==
Depicts a behind-the-scenes look at a film that's part of a larger superhero film franchise. The series follows Daniel, the first assistant director (1st AD), as he deals with the day to day problems working on Tecto: Eye of the Storm, which is a minor film in the franchise compared to the higher priority "team-up" film, Centurios 2.

== Cast ==
=== Main ===
- Himesh Patel as Daniel Kumar, the overworked first assistant director who juggles the film's chaotic demands, trying to keep the project on track while secretly caring more about the superhero genre than he admits
- Aya Cash as Anita, the ambitious new producer and Daniel's ex, focused on using the project as a springboard to more prestigious films, often clashing with Daniel's earnestness
- Jessica Hynes as Steph, a British script supervisor and staunch supporter of the director's "vision," even when it leads to absurdity on set
- Billy Magnussen as Adam Randolph, Tecto's self-conscious lead actor, whose eccentric fitness regimens and insecurities clash with his superhero persona
- Lolly Adefope as Dagmara "Dag" Nwaeze, the sharp-witted third assistant director, who sees through the industry's pretensions and frequently delivers biting commentary
- Darren Goldstein as Pat Shannon, a brash studio executive who enforces studio interests, often derailing the production with last-minute directives
- Isaac Powell as Bryson, the frazzled go-between for the studio head Shane, tasked with conveying outlandish directives to the set
- Richard E. Grant as Peter Fairchild, a seasoned British actor playing "Eye," bringing both disdain and theatrical flair to his role
- Daniel Brühl as Eric Bouchard, the highbrow director with an inflated ego and endless tweaks, unfit for the blockbuster studio system

=== Recurring ===
- Justin Edwards as Rufus Maley, a featured extra
- Ruaridh Mollica as Jaz Cox, the production's PA
- George Fouracres as Dave, the VFX artist

=== Guest ===
- Urs Rechn as Horst Sommer
- Alex Gaumond as Justin Barrett, the original producer
- Katherine Waterston as Quinn Walker, the actress playing the Lilac Ghost
- Nick Kroll as Kyle, the actor playing the Gurgler who has a past with Adam

== Episodes ==
No.	Title	Directed by	Written by	Original release date
1	"Scene 31A: Tecto Meets Eye"	Sam Mendes	Jon Brown	October 6, 2024
Dag begins her first day on the chaotic set of the comic book movie Tecto: Eye of the Storm. Pat, a studio executive, is visiting, so first AD Dan negotiates with the eccentric director, Eric, about the film's lighting. Eric begins shooting a scene where the protagonist Tecto (played by Adam) speaks with The Eye (played by Peter) in a meeting attended by "Moss Men" and "Fish People", only to be upset by Pat's news that during the production of Centurios 2, a tentpole team-up movie set chronologically prior to Eye of the Storm, the studio decided to massacre the Fish People. Eric's impulsive decision to include a new lighting rig has sunburnt the eyes of Adam and Peter. Eric's favored producer is fired and replaced with Anita, with whom Dan has history.
2	"Scene 36: The Invisible Jackhammer"	Liza Johnson	Tony Roche	October 13, 2024
Anita calls an early meeting and cancels it, setting the crew on edge. Dan becomes determined to nail the stunt-heavy scene being filmed. The shoot is hindered by Peter's spine, Adam's awkwardness at the choreography required for the script's "invisible jackhammer", and Eric's refusal to shoot without 80 extras. Anita scolds Daniel in front of the crew to establish herself and fend off any questions about their previous fling. Dan privatedly implores Anita to cut the scene and to convince Shane to focus more on the creative aspect, as audiences are experiencing superhero fatigue. Pat warns Anita that the studio is iffy on Tecto and assures her that if the film fails it will not be pinned on her. The crew completes the stunt.
3	"Scene 54: The Lilac Ghost"	Liza Johnson	Rachel Axler	October 20, 2024
Pat asks Anita to increase the feminist optics on Tecto to mitigate backlash from the cancellation of the franchise's planned all-female film. She asks the crew to beef up a supporting superheroine, the Lilac Ghost, and expand her role in the film. The crew scrambles to give the Lilac Ghost a cool new superpower and decide on the powerful "Stick of Maximum Potency" despite Dan's protests about comic accuracy and shooting logistics. The Lilac Ghost's actress, Quinn, initially refuses to film new scenes, turned off by the toxic fandom and the studio's lack of attention to her concerns. Meanwhile, Adam panics about the side effects of his new growth hormones and becomes emasculated by the Lilac Ghost's new powers, causing his team to step in. Anita and Dan agree to work together. Photos of Quinn holding the Stick leak online; to her dismay, the studio increases security measures in response to fan displeasure.
4	"Scene 83: Enter the Gurgler"	Tom George	Dillon Mapletoft	October 27, 2024
The crew is blindsided by the news that the Gurgler, an unpopular superhero with mucus powers, will cameo in the film. Kyle, the actor playing the Gurgler, resents Adam for a past sitcom they starred in where the more handsome Adam got the lead role over him, while he was relegated to playing a fat teenager. The team visits the set of Centurios 2 to retrieve the crystal prop Eric had procured; Anita unsuccessfully tries to negotiate for a better cameo. In attempt to match Kyle's humor, Adam asks Steph to beef up Tecto's humor. Back on set, Adam's attempt at ad-libbing jokes ends in Kyle humiliating him in front of the crew. Eric gets fed up with studio interference and drives a golf cart into the Centurios set, infuriating the studio executives.
5	"Scene 16: Eric's Hospital Scene"	Tom George	Keith Akushie	November 3, 2024
To appease the studio, Anita agrees to include product placement for a Chinese farming company, and the crew worries how to integrate a tractor into the space-set Tecto. Dan suggests adding it to the scene in which Tecto's wife dies in the hospital, which the studio is otherwise iffy on. Adam is jealous that Peter will appear in Centurios 2. He asks Dag to be his donor for a fecal transplant, but Dag misinterprets and defecates in Adam's trailer. Furious that the studio asks for another tractor to be integrated in the film, Eric goes on a tirade against China, which is reported in the industry trades. On Pat's orders, Eric bitterly shoots an endorsement for a Chinese milk brand that had previously been reported unsafe.
6	"Scene 110: Baptism of Fire"	Kevin Bray	Marina Hyde	November 10, 2024
A scene involving a large gas-powered fireball effect is unpopular with the crew as it must be shot late into the night. The news that Christopher Nolan will be visiting the set prompts Eric to worry about the size of the fireball and delay the shoot to do rewrites to try and impress Nolan. The crew are not happy with the delay and get more upset when Pat returns trying to meet Nolan and ends up winning a raffle that Dan had set up to boost morale. Adam struggles to play music to try and cheer up the crew. Peter discloses an erection that will not subside and gets Dag to fix a remote vibrator app for his wife. Eric's script changes come without enough lead time and Peter refuses to do the new lines. With Eric too nervous to come out of his trailer, Dan rewrites the line on the fly and orders maximum output on the fireball, which destroys it, but results in a great scene for which Eric gets the credit, though Anita personally praises him. Nolan arrives and only interacts with Dag and Bryson.
7	"Scene 113: The Bridge"	Kevin Bray	Juli Weiner	November 17, 2024
The crew is shooting an on-location scene in Armenia in which they are blowing up a historically significant bridge. After reading a critique of superhero movies by Martin Scorsese, Eric has another breakdown, deciding to hole up in his trailer and rewrite the scene to include no costumes and extensive dialogue in a misguided attempt to try and save cinema. Dan steps up as acting director again and sets up various schemes to keep Eric in the trailer and out of the loop. He throws a local, endangered bat into the water to prevent the shoot being stopped by conservation authorities. Anita flirts with Dan, but must get a rabies shot when she kisses the hand he threw the bat with. Pat is impressed with Dan and proposes replacing Eric as director. Due to a misunderstanding with Dag and the explosives crew, the scene is ruined when a nearby bridge that was not the one in the shot is destroyed instead, releasing a swarm of bats. The crew bribes the local staff, destroys the evidence of the shoot, and tells Eric that they will be doing it entirely in VFX instead.
8	"Scene 117: The Death of Eye"	Kevin Bray	Jon Brown	November 24, 2024
Pat gets Anita to edit his upcoming studio presentation speech, which lets her see a note that Tecto might be pulled. Anita, Dan, and Dag decide to pitch a rewrite of the film based on Dan's ideas directly to Shane without Eric knowing. During Peter's final scene, he blows up at Eric's overbearing direction and insults the crew. Before he can storm off, a VFX worker pressed into extra work breaks down and causes a security incident during which he reveals the rewrite to the entire crew. Eric insults Dan as bitter and inferior filmmaker. Anita, Dan, and Dag pitch the rewrite to Shane without storyboards. Pat announces that due to issues with Centurios 2, that film is getting delayed and Tecto is being pulled forward to be the next tentpole film, which makes everyone but Dan happy. Eric thanks Dan for saving the film, but fires him for going behind his back. Dan promotes Dag to first AD and prepares to drive home before being interrupted by Pat, who says that Shane was impressed and wants him back in some capacity.

== Production ==
=== Development ===
It was announced in August 2022 that HBO had greenlit a pilot for the series from Armando Iannucci, who would write the pilot alongside Keith Akushie and Jon Brown, with Sam Mendes set to direct, who also conceived of the idea of the series. In August 2023, it was ordered to series. The series premiere on HBO on October 6, 2024. In January 2025, HBO canceled the series after one season.

=== Casting ===
In December 2022, Billy Magnussen, Jessica Hynes, Darren Goldstein, Lolly Adefope and Isaac Cole Powell were cast in main roles, with Richard E. Grant and Daniel Brühl set to recur. In August 2023, Himesh Patel and Aya Cash were cast as series regulars.

=== Filming ===
Production on the pilot was completed before July 14, 2023, with filming suspended until the conclusion of the 2023 SAG-AFTRA strike. Filming for the first season commenced on February 26, 2024, with a planned three month production, at Warner Bros. Studios Leavesden in Leavesden, Hertfordshire, England.

== Reception ==
On the review aggregator website Rotten Tomatoes, The Franchise has an approval rating of 74% based on 54 reviews, with an average rating of 7/10. The website's critics consensus reads, "Teeming with superb actors having a ball playing hapless hacks, The Franchise pulls some of its punches against Hollywood malaise but overall makes for a tart treat." Metacritic, which uses a weighted average, assigned a score of 67 out of 100 based on 29 critics, indicating "generally favorable" reviews.

== Airing ==
The show premiered on HBO on October 6, 2024, and later on Sky Comedy in the UK on October 21, 2024. The series is also available to stream on HBO Max.
