= The Color of Water =

1995 autobiography and memoir of James McBride

- Author: James McBride
- Cover artist: Honi Werner
- Language: English
- Genre: Memoir
- Publisher: Penguin Group
- Publication date: 1996
- Publication place: United States
- Pages: 301
- ISBN: 978-1-59448-192-5

The Color of Water: A Black Man's Tribute to His White Mother, is the autobiography and memoir of James McBride first published in 1995; it is also a tribute to his mother, whom he calls Mommy, or Ma. The chapters alternate between James McBride's descriptions of his early life and first-person accounts of his mother Ruth's life, mostly taking place before McBride was born.

== Synopsis ==
In The Color of Water author James McBride writes both his autobiography and a tribute to the life of his mother, Ruth Zylska, a white woman who married Andrew Dennis McBride, a black man from North Carolina. James's childhood was spent in a chaotic household of 12 children who had neither the time nor the outlet to ponder questions of race and identity. Ruth did not want to discuss the painful details of her early life when her abusive father, "Tateh", lorded it over her sweet-tempered and meek mother, "Mameh" ["tateh" and "mameh" are Yiddish terms of endearment for "father" and "mother," roughly equivalent to "daddy and "mommy"). Ruth had cut all ties with her Jewish family, as they had essentially disowned her when she married James's father.

Born Ruchel Zylska to an Orthodox Jewish family in Poland, Ruth arrived in the United States when she was two years old. She spent her early childhood traveling around the country with her family as her father, Fishel Shilsky, sought employment as a rabbi. Shilsky eventually gave up hope of making a living as a rabbi, settled the family in Suffolk, Virginia, and opened a store in the mostly black section of town, where he overcharged his customers and expressed racist opinions. When Ruth was a child, her father sexually abused her and made harsh demands on her to work constantly in the family store. He also cheated on his wife, in an affair of which practically everyone in town was aware. Ruth's brother Sam left home at age fifteen, and soon after, Ruth too felt she must leave, wanting to escape the oppressive environment of both her family and the South. She was also pregnant by Peter, her black boyfriend in Suffolk, and wanted to deal with the pregnancy away from her family. She trips to New York to stay with relatives, and later moved permanently to Harlem. Ruth's family disowned her when she left, disgusted with her choice of marrying a black man rather than a Jew, her general failure to embrace Judaism, and the defiance of her father. Ruth promised her sister Dee-Dee that she would return to Suffolk, but she could not reconcile her family's desires for her life with her own desires for her life. She betrayed her promise to return for Dee-Dee, and her relationship with her sister suffered as a consequence. This separation from her family recurs throughout the memoir as a painful element in Ruth's life.

In Harlem, Ruth met Dennis, to whom she was immediately attracted. She married him, converted to Christianity, and became very involved with church activities. While the couple experienced a certain degree of prejudice as a result of their interracial marriage, Ruth recalls these years of her life as her happiest ones. Dennis and Ruth opened the New Brown Memorial Church together in memory of Reverend Brown, their favorite preacher. They had several children, and eventually moved to accommodate their growing family. When Ruth was pregnant with Dennis' eighth child, James, Dennis fell ill with lung cancer, and died before their child was born. Ruth mourned his death deeply and became desperate to find a means to support herself and her eight children. She approached her relatives for assistance, but they refused to have any contact with her. Ruth met her second husband, Hunter Jordan, soon after. They married and eventually had four children together.

James weaves his own life story into his mother's story. Ruth's philosophies on race, religion, and work influence him greatly. She always sent her children to the best schools, no matter the commute, to ensure they received the finest possible educations. She demanded respect and hard work from her children, and always treated them tenderly. She had an unwavering faith in God and strong moral convictions. To Ruth, issues of race and identity took secondary importance to moral beliefs. Ruth died at her home in Ewing, New Jersey, on January 9, 2010.

== Characters ==
=== Ruth's side of the family ===
- James: the narrator, her son
- Ruth McBride Jordan: mother of 12 children and the second narrator
- Hudis Shilsky aka Mameh: Ruth's mother. Despite being crippled on the left side of her body, she still managed to be a loyal wife and good mother.
- Fishel Shilsky aka Tateh: Ruth's father. Tateh was a terrible husband and also a rabbi, who would get into bed with his daughters. He even mocked his wife in public for being a cripple.
- Gladys "Dee-dee" Shilsky: Ruth's sister, the only sibling of Ruth's that was born in America. Often, Ruth would say that she was envious of her because she didn't have to deal with the negative stigma of being Jewish like Ruth did.
- Sam Shilsky: Ruth's brother. He ran away from home at 15, no longer wanting to deal with Tateh. Ruth says that he died while fighting in the Second World War.

=== James's side of the family ===
- Andrew Dennis McBride: the biological father of James, Ruth's first husband, a very caring father and pastor. Died of lung cancer.
- Hunter Jordan: stepfather, Ruth's second husband, died after having a relapse of a stroke
- From eldest to youngest (excluding James, who is the eighth child): Dennis, Rosetta, Billy, David, Helen, Richard, Dotty, Kathy, Judy, Hunter, and Henry: James's 11 siblings (Jacqueline "Jack": Andrew's daughter from a previous marriage)
- Nash and Etta: his grandparents
- Henry Walter, and Garland: uncles
- Clemy: cousin from down South
- Z and Maya: his nieces
- Becky: sister-in-law
- Karen aka Karone, Leander Bien, and Laurie Wesman: ex-girlfriends
- Stephanie: current wife
- Linwood Bob Hinson: cousin from North Carolina
- Azure and Jordan: James's children

=== Other characters ===
- Frances Moody: Ruth's very close childhood friend, a gentile, the only schoolmate who befriended Ruth
- Peter: Ruth's first boyfriend, who got her pregnant. Ruth later dumped him after she found out that he had gotten another girl pregnant.
- Billy Smith: James's best friend
- Big Richard: Jack's husband and James's friend
- Mrs. Ingram: Ruth's best friend as an adult
- Israel Levy: old friend of Ruth who allowed her father (rabbi) a permanent place
- Rocky: the manager of the barber shop
- C. Lawler Rogers and Hal Schiff: music teachers
- David H. and Ann Fox Dawson: donors who helped James go to Europe concerning his aspiration to be a musician
- Chicken Man: A friend of Big Richard's who teaches James all he knows about the streets and helps him turn his life around

== Setting ==
- Place: Suffolk, Virginia (Ruth's hometown); New York City (James McBride's home during most of his childhood); Wilmington, Delaware (James's family moved to Delaware in his teen years).
- Time: James's life (the part of his life written about in The Color of Water): 1960–90 and Ruth's life (the part of her life written about): Started in 1920, emphasis on 1930s, '40s, and '50s.

== Symbols ==
=== Black Power ===
James spoke of the Civil Rights Movement which foreshadowed his decision to lean towards the African-American side of his biracial identity. Many of his older siblings had also chosen to only acknowledge that they were African-American.

=== Ruth's bicycle ===
This symbolized her constant need for movement to deal with her stress and depression and escapism.

=== Ruth's mother's song: Love of Birds ===
When Ruth's mother sang the song "Birdie, Birdie, Fly Away", she was referring to Ruth as the bird, able to move so swiftly and easily, while she referred to herself as the handicapped bird who deserved to be sacrificed and killed. This foreshadowed her death.

== Themes ==
- Past vs. Present; self-motivation; and the burden of secrets
- Racism. Black-white relationships in the United States and how they were shaped by the civil rights/Black Power movements
- Feeling comfortable with not only one's identity, but one's background and sense of self

== Reception ==
The trade paper edition, published in February 1998, was on The New York Times bestseller list for over 100 weeks (2 years), won the 1997 Anisfield-Wolf Book Award for Literary Excellence, was an ALA Notable Book of the Year, The New York Women's Agenda's first book for "New York City Reads Together" and has sold more than 1.5 million copies. It has been published in 16 languages and in more than 20 countries. The New York Times called the stories of McBride and his mother "beautifully juxtaposed."
