= Deacon King Kong =

2020 literary fiction novel by James McBride

- Author: James McBride
- Language: English
- Genre: Literary fiction
- Set in: Brooklyn, 1969
- Publisher: Riverhead Books
- Publication date: March 3, 2020
- Pages: 370 pp. (hardcover 1st ed.)
- ISBN: 9780735216723 (hardcover 1st ed.)
- OCLC: 1122690620
- Dewey Decimal: 813/.6
- LC Class: PS3613.C28 D43 2020

Deacon King Kong is a novel by James McBride. It notably won the Andrew Carnegie Medals for Excellence for Fiction, Anisfield-Wolf Book Award for Fiction, and Thurber Prize for American Humor.

== Narrative ==
The story unfolds in September 1969 Brooklyn and centers around volatile Cuffy Lambkin, nicknamed "Sportcoat". Sportcoat, a heavy drinker and church deacon, shocks his community by publicly shooting a young drug dealer, Deems Clemens, in broad daylight at the Cause Houses housing project. The incident sets off a chain of events involving the church community, local gangsters, the police, and residents of the housing complex. As secrets about Sportcoat, Deems, and others come to light, the novel explores their interconnected lives during a period of social and personal upheaval.

== Release ==
It was published in the United States on March 3, 2020.

== Awards ==
Year	Award	Category	Result	Ref.
2020	Booklist Editors' Choice	Adult Audio	Won	
2020	Goodreads Choice Awards	Historical Fiction	Nominated–14th	
2020	Kirkus Prize	Fiction	Shortlisted	
2020	New York City Book Award	—	Won	
2021	Andrew Carnegie Medals for Excellence	Fiction	Won	
2021	Anisfield-Wolf Book Award	Fiction	Won	
2021	Audie Award	Literary Fiction & Classics	Shortlisted	
2021	Dayton Literary Peace Prize	Fiction	Shortlisted	
2021	Mark Twain American Voice in Literature Award	—	Shortlisted	
2021	Thurber Prize for American Humor	—	Won	
