= Miracle at St. Anna =

2008 film by Spike Lee

- Theatrical release poster
- Directed by: Spike Lee
- Written by: James McBride
- Based on: Miracle at St. Anna by James McBride
- Produced by: Spike Lee; Roberto Cicutto; Luigi Musini
- Starring: Derek Luke; Michael Ealy; Laz Alonso; Omar Benson Miller; Pierfrancesco Favino; Valentina Cervi
- Cinematography: Matthew Libatique
- Edited by: Barry Alexander Brown
- Music by: Terence Blanchard
- Production companies: Touchstone Pictures; 40 Acres and a Mule Filmworks; Rai Cinema; On My Own Produzioni Cinematografiche
- Distributed by: Walt Disney Studios Motion Pictures (United States); 01 Distribution (Italy)
- Release dates: September 7, 2008 (TIFF); September 26, 2008 (United States); October 3, 2008 (Italy)
- Running time: 160 minutes
- Countries: United States; Italy
- Languages: English; Italian; German
- Budget: $45 million
- Box office: $9.3 million

Miracle at St. Anna is a 2008 epic war film directed by Spike Lee and written by James McBride, based on McBride's 2003 novel. The film stars Derek Luke, Michael Ealy, Laz Alonso, Omar Benson Miller, Pierfrancesco Favino and Valentina Cervi, with John Turturro, Joseph Gordon Levitt, John Leguizamo, D.B. Sweeney and Kerry Washington in supporting roles. Set primarily in Italy during the Italian campaign of World War II, the film tells the story of four Buffalo Soldiers of the 92nd Infantry Division who seek refuge in a small Tuscan village, where they form a bond with the residents. The story is presented as a flashback, as one survivor, Hector Negron (Alonso), reflects upon his experiences in a frame story set in 1980s New York. Several real-life events that occurred during the war, such as the Sant'Anna di Stazzema massacre, are re-enacted, placing Miracle at St. Anna within the genre of historical fiction.

The film is a co-production of the United States and Italy. Lee first learned of the novel in 2004 and approached McBride with the idea of a film adaptation. In Europe, the film's development attracted the attention of Italian film producers Roberto Cicutto and Luigi Musini, who helped finance the $45 million production. A majority of the film was shot in Italy, on several locations affected by World War II. Other filming locations included New York, Louisiana and the Bahamas. Frequent Lee collaborator Terence Blanchard composed the score, and the visual effects were created by Industrial Light & Magic.

Miracle at St. Anna premiered at the 2008 Toronto International Film Festival before it was released on September 26, 2008. It was met with mostly negative reviews from critics and drew controversy in Italy over historical inaccuracies. During its theatrical run, Miracle at St. Anna was a box-office bomb, grossing only $9.3 million worldwide.

== Plot ==
In 1983, Hector Negron, an aged, African-American World War II veteran, works as a post office clerk in New York City. After recognizing a customer, Negron shoots and kills the man with a German Luger pistol. Several hours later, rookie reporter Tim Boyle and Detective Tony Ricci are at the crime scene seeking information. At Negron's apartment, Boyle, Ricci, and other officers discover a finely carved statue head, the head of the Primavera, a long-missing segment from the Ponte Santa Trinita. Also found is a Purple Heart and a photograph revealing that Negron was awarded the Distinguished Service Cross and Silver Star.

Negron, in a flashback, tells of his war experiences as a young corporal of the segregated 92nd Infantry Division in Italy, late 1944 during the Gothic line phase of the Italian campaign. A disastrous attack ensues on German positions across the Serchio River. An officer, Captain Nokes, calls down artillery on the 92nd's own position, refusing to believe their reports of how far they have advanced. Many American soldiers are killed, leaving Negron stranded on the wrong side of the river with three men: Staff Sergeant Aubrey Stamps, Sergeant Bishop Cummings, and Private Sam Train. Sam carries the Head of the Primavera that he found in Florence, which he believes to carry magical powers. He and Bishop rescue an Italian boy named Angelo from a collapsing building. While traveling through the mountains of Tuscany, the soldiers enter a small village where they form a bond with the residents. Sam grows especially fond of Angelo, becoming the boy's father figure. One of the villagers, Renata, soon becomes entangled in a love triangle with Stamps and Bishop, which creates conflict.

After Negron gets his damaged backpack radio working, the soldiers contact headquarters and are told to capture an enemy soldier. A local Italian Partisan group arrives with a young German deserter, Hans Brundt, as their prisoner. Earlier, residents of the nearby village of Sant'Anna di Stazzema were killed by German forces following a betrayal by an Italian partisan, named Rodolfo, who knows that Brundt can identify him as the traitor. After concealing the fact that German forces are approaching the village in a counterattack, Rodolfo kills Brundt and the Partisan leader before escaping. It is Rodolfo whom Negron will kill 39 years later. Captain Nokes arrives in the village to interrogate Brundt and finds him dead. The Americans prepare to leave the village ahead of a German counterattack, but Sam refuses to leave Angelo behind. After promising to court-martial all four soldiers, Nokes and his contingent drive out of town, but are killed in the opening German offensive.

The remaining Americans and Italian Partisans hold their ground, killing many Germans. Bishop and Negron hold off the Germans while Stamps tries to get the villagers to safety, but they are too heavily outnumbered. Sam, Stamps and Bishop are killed in the attack. While attempting to retreat, Negron is shot in the back, but is saved by his backpack radio. After Angelo gives him the Primavera's head, Negron gives the boy his rosary and tells him to leave. Angelo is led away by the spirit of his brother Arturo, who had been killed during the massacre at St. Anna. Negron is spared by a German officer who hands him his own Luger pistol and tells Negron to defend himself. More Americans arrive and secure the village before evacuating Negron.

In 1984, Negron is the defendant in a court proceeding, facing a life sentence for his killing of Rodolfo. He is defended at his bail hearing by a powerful attorney acting on behalf of an unknown wealthy man. Negron is brought to the Bahamas and is reunited with the head of the Primavera, accompanied by its new owner who takes out a rosary and reveals himself as an adult Angelo. They both hold Negron's rosary and burst into tears of remembrance.

== Cast ==
- Derek Luke as Staff Sergeant Aubrey Stamps:

One of four stranded Buffalo Soldiers from the 92nd Infantry Division. Director Spike Lee described Stamps as "the leader" of the men, while screenwriter James McBride stated that, "Stamps is a well-educated college graduate who has both faith and disappointment in the American system. He's deeply divided as to what his place and the place of the Negro in American society is or should be." Wesley Snipes was originally cast as Stamps, but could not commit due to his financial troubles.

- Michael Ealy as Sergeant Bishop Cummings:

One of the four soldiers, a womanizer and card player. The character is also known for being arrogant and distrustful, and shows hatred towards his white commanders. Lee stated that the character is “a happy-go-lucky guy. He does not like to be under the thumb of authority. He likes card games and women.” Ealy described the character's indifference: "I think Bishop is the voice that doesn't believe change is going to come, and doesn't believe that he belongs over there fighting." Terrence Howard was originally in talks to play Bishop, prior to Ealy's casting.

- Laz Alonso as Corporal Hector Negron:

Negron first appears in the film's frame story as a bitter, 70-year-old World War II veteran living in Harlem, New York who reflects on his experiences during World War II. Negron, a black Nuyorican, is fluent in English, Spanish and Italian, which enables him to serve as an interpreter for the Americans and Italians. Alonso first learned of the novel from his agent and read it prior to auditioning for the role. He had to convince Lee that he was fluent in Spanish, and created an audition tape of himself speaking the language, which won him the role. Alonso found difficulty in portraying Negron as an elderly World War II veteran: "This role was very emotionally draining. Ninety percent of the time, the elderly have outlived most of the people they have loved. When I played Negrón as an old man, I had to focus on everything I've lost in my life: my dad, friends and love lost, and that was a really depressing thing to do."

- Omar Benson Miller as Private First Class Samuel "Sam" Train:

The "biggest" of the four soldiers, Sam is known for his child-like personality. He befriends a young Italian boy, Angelo Torancelli, and becomes a father figure to the child. Sam is first to discover a finely carved statue head, the Head of the Primavera, which he believes to carry magical powers. Miller was a fan of McBride's novel prior to learning of the film adaptation by Lee. He fought hard to win the role of Sam, which resulted in him physically preparing for the part: "My physical prep was a little different than everybody else's, because Spike wanted me for the movie, but he told me I had to lose weight to do it. I had nine weeks to lose 60 pounds. We got it done."

- Matteo Sciabordi as Angelo Torancelli – The Boy:

A young Italian boy who befriends Sam Train. Sciabordi appears in his debut film role. Lee issued a casting call for an Italian child actor. 5,000 child actors auditioned for the role prior to Sciabordi's casting. Sciabordi described working with co-star Omar Benson Miller: "Omar was great fun. We were always playing and he even taught me how to play baseball." Luigi Lo Cascio portrays an adult Angelo in the film's final scene.

- Pierfrancesco Favino as Peppi "The Great Butterfly" Grotta:

The leader of a Partisan group operating in the area. Favino was the filmmakers' primary choice for the role. McBride suggested that the character represents the great Partisan leaders who led thousands in Italy throughout World War II: "He's a deeply thoughtful young man. After witnessing several atrocities, he basically snaps and becomes one of the most ruthless and most clever and most sought-after Partisans. Although he's ruthless against his enemies, he's always a fair-minded person, deeply kind, fighting for his country—not fighting to kill Germans, fighting to kill the enemy. He's a leader with a heart."

- Valentina Cervi as Renata Salducci:

One of the Italian villagers, who proves to be an instant ally of the four soldiers. Renata soon becomes entangled in a love triangle with Stamps and Bishop, which creates conflict. McBride said of the character, "Renata exemplifies the difficulties Italian women faced during the war. Her husband was drafted and she hasn't heard from him in two years. She's very smart and is one of the few people in her village who has learned some English. She tries very hard to make her father renounce his Fascist beliefs."

- John Turturro as Detective Antonio "Tony" Ricci, who is charged with investigating a post office murder in 1983
- Joseph Gordon-Levitt as Tim Boyle, the investigative reporter assigned to cover the murder and subsequent discovery of an Italian artifact
- Kerry Washington as Zana Wilder, a lawyer hired to represent the suspected post office murderer. Naomi Campbell was originally cast as Wilder in September 2007, but later pulled out due to scheduling conflicts.

Other cast members include John Leguizamo, in a cameo appearance, as Enrico; D. B. Sweeney as Colonel Jack Driscoll, an advocate for the Buffalo Soldiers; Robert John Burke as General Ned Almond, a high-ranking officer who opposes the 92nd Division; Omari Hardwick as Platoon Commander Huggs; Omero Antonutti as Ludovico Salducci, Renata's Fascist father; Sergio Albelli as Rodolfo Berelli, a Partisan of questionable loyalties; Lydia Biondi as Natalina, a village healer; Michael K. Williams as Tucker, a scared soldier; Walton Goggins as Captain Nokes; Christian Berkel as Captain Eichholz; Colman Domingo as a West Indian postal customer; Jan Pohl as Corporal Hans Brundt, the German deserter; and Alexandra Maria Lara as Mildred Gillars, nicknamed Axis Sally, an American broadcaster employed by the Germans as a propagandist.

== Production ==
=== Development ===
You could say it's a war movie. You could say it's a movie about a boy and a man. You could say it's a movie about Americans and Italians. You could say it's a movie about a German who does the right thing. But the film is ultimately about the miracle of love between human beings and the choices they make in the face of enormous adversity.
—Screenwriter James McBride describing the film adaptation of his novel.

The novel Miracle at St. Anna was written by James McBride originating from his late uncle's experiences as a World War II soldier. Upon writing the novel, McBride conducted his own research and learned of the 92nd Infantry Division, which consisted of 15,000 African-American soldiers, who served in Italy during World War II from August 1944 to November 1945. McBride interviewed several remaining members of the 92nd Division. "I studied Italian at The New School in New York City," he explained. "I moved to Italy with my family for six months. I interviewed dozens of Italians—Partisans and Fascists. I interviewed dozens of African-American soldiers who fought in the war, most who have since passed away. I must have read at least 20 books. I went to the Army War College in Carlisle, Pennsylvania. I studied the whole business of what the 92nd did in Italy during the war, to try to get an idea of what really transpired." The 92nd Division served as the basis for McBride's novel, which was published in 2003.

Spike Lee first learned of the novel in 2004 and contacted McBride about making a film adaptation. He felt that McBride was the perfect person to write the screenplay, believing that his novel would serve as a guide. Commenting on the difficult process of adapting his book into a screenplay, McBride stated, “As a novelist, you tend to think internally. You can guide what the character says and you can explore what he or she is thinking. Movies don't have time to explain. You have to get right to the muscle.”

The film adaptation of Miracle at St. Anna attracted the attention of Italian producers Roberto Cicutto and Luigi Musini, the co-founders of On My Own Produzioni Cinematografiche. Cicutto explained that they knew that Lee was "not just coming to Italy to make a film as an American director, but to make a film that belongs to his culture and to our history." The film's budget was an estimated $45 million. Under their Own My Own production banner, Cicutto and Musini contributed $8.74 million. Lee's reputation as an acclaimed filmmaker in Europe, where he served as a jury member of the 2004 Venice Film Festival, also helped the filmmakers obtain two-thirds of the budget from Italy's RAI Cinema and France's TF1 ($30 million). Touchstone Pictures provided the remainder ($6.26 million), and later released the film in North America.

Lee described Miracle at St. Anna as an "ensemble piece" and aimed for authenticity in his depiction of American and German soldiers battling in Italy. In casting Italian actors, he held a casting call in Rome. The Italian actors, all born in Rome, were coached to sound as though they were from Tuscany. The actors portraying soldiers underwent a two-week boot camp, supervised by senior military advisor Billy Budd, a 15-year Royal Marine veteran who had served in the Falklands War.

=== Filming ===
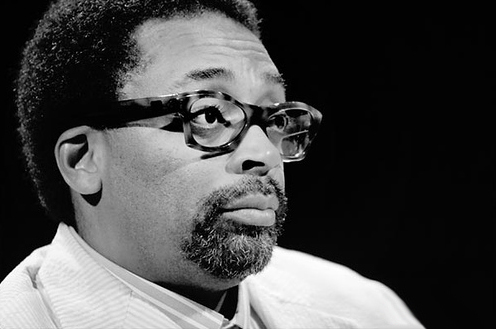
Director Spike Lee in 2007

Principal photography for Miracle at St. Anna lasted nine weeks, beginning in October 2007 and concluding in December of that year; filming took place in Italy, New York, Louisiana and the Bahamas. The film was the first by Lee to be shot in Europe, and the director insisted on shooting on locations where the story is set. Filming began in Tuscany, where the Tuscan regional government gave Lee permission to film where the actual events took place. According to producer Luigi Musini, Miracle at St. Anna was shot along the Gothic Line, which was the major line of defense in the final stages of World War II: "The location is highly representative of what the war was in Italy, what our resistance was. True dramatic episodes took place there.” The first ten days of filming took place on the Serchio River, covering the battle sequence that opens the film. A scene that recreates the Sant'Anna di Stazzema massacre was shot where the atrocity took place; the massacre—in which over 500 villagers were murdered by German occupation forces—is re-enacted in the film. Filming then took place in Rome for one month; in New York for four days; in White Castle, Louisiana for two days; and in the Bahamas for two days.

=== Design and visual effects ===
Matthew Libatique served as cinematographer, having previously collaborated with Lee on the films She Hate Me (2004) and Inside Man (2006). Libatique relied on the use of natural light, which proved challenging for scenes shot indoors. The final battle sequence in the film was especially difficult as the film relied on the use of practical effects and difficult weather conditions. Libatique's solution was to collaborate with Lee, military advisor Billy Budd, and first assistant director Mike Ellis in creating storyboards to choreograph the scenes. Production designer Tonino Zera was tasked with filling outdoor locations with greenery, rebuilding exteriors and constructing the interior of an Italian barn. Costume designer Carlo Poggiolo consulted with a former Buffalo Soldier of the 92nd Division, prior to designing the American soldiers' outfits. He also provided contemporary and historical wardrobe pieces. Ernest R. Dickerson, who previously worked with Lee as cinematographer on all of his films from She's Gotta Have It (1986) to Malcolm X (1992), served as second unit director, cinematographer, and camera operator on the film. The visual effects were created by Lucasfilm's Industrial Light & Magic (ILM). After Lee approached him, Lucas allowed ILM's team of artists to work on the visual effects for the film.

=== Music ===
Terence Blanchard composed the film score, marking his twelfth collaboration with Lee. For the score, he attempted to make a distinction between American and German soldiers. "That was first done through the use of percussion, using a higher-pitched, tighter sound for Germans, and a fuller-field drum sound for Americans," he explained. "I also distinguished by using French horns for American forces, and a Wagner tuben for German forces." Scoring the film required the use of a 90-piece orchestra, which was larger than in any of Lee's previous films. Blanchard also relied on the use of instruments from the 1940s era, including a mandolin, accordion, slide guitar and rope drum. The film's soundtrack, titled Miracle at St. Anna: Original Soundtrack, was released in CD and digital downloading formats by Hollywood Records on September 23, 2008. The trailers prominently feature the song "1000 Ships of the Underworld" by Two Steps From Hell.

== Release ==
Walt Disney Studios Motion Pictures released Miracle at St. Anna through the Touchstone Pictures label. The film's world premiere was at the 2008 Toronto International Film Festival on September 7, 2008. The film later premiered in France at the 34th Deauville American Film Festival on September 10, 2008. Miracle at St. Anna premiered in New York City at the Ziegfeld Theatre on September 22, 2008. Disney released the film in the United States and Canada on September 26, 2008. The film was released in Italy on October 3, 2008; in Romania on April 10, 2009; in Bolivia and Brazil on April 30, 2009; in the United Arab Emirates on May 28, 2009; and in Lebanon on September 10, 2009.

=== Box office ===
Miracle at St. Anna grossed $7,658,999 in North America and $1,404,716 from markets elsewhere—a worldwide total of $9,323,833 against a $45 million budget.

On its opening day in North America, the film debuted at ninth place, grossing $967,329 from 1,185 theaters. The end of the opening weekend saw the film take a total of $3,477,996—for an average of $2,935 per theater—finishing as the number eight grossing film of the weekend. Steve Mason of Hollywood.com believed that Miracle at St. Anna's negative reviews and moviegoers' declining interest in war films contributed to the film's poor box office performance. On its second weekend, the film saw a 50.1% decrease in revenue, moving down to fourteenth place and earning an additional $1,736,302—an average of $1,465 per theatre. Miracle at St. Anna was pulled out of theatres on November 25, 2008 after 61 days (8.7 weeks) of domestic release.

Following its release in North America, Miracle at St. Anna continued to perform poorly in international markets. Its highest gross was in Italy, where it grossed $1,363,754 during its theatrical run. Also contributing to the film's $1.4 million gross in international markets was Bolivia ($9,821), Brazil ($9,821), Lebanon ($3,184), Romania ($1,465), and the United Arab Emirates ($26,492).

=== Home media ===
Miracle at St. Anna was released on DVD and Blu-ray formats by Buena Vista Home Entertainment on February 10, 2009. The DVD is available in separate anamorphic widescreen and Blu-ray editions, each with Dolby Digital 5.1 and 2.0 tracks. Upon its release on DVD, Miracle at St. Anna debuted in eighth place, selling 142,782 units in its first week. In North America, the film has grossed $10.1 million from DVD sales. The extra features include a meeting of Spike Lee with surviving Buffalo Soldiers and Tuskegee Airmen discussing their personal war experiences.

== Reception ==
=== Critical response ===
The film has received mostly negative reviews from critics. On the review aggregator site Rotten Tomatoes, the film has an approval rating of 33% based on 121 reviewer and a weighted average of 5.2/10. The website's consensus states "Miracle at St. Anna is a well-intentioned but overlong, disjointed affair that hits few of the right notes." Metacritic, another review aggregator, assigned the film a normalized score of 37% based on 31 reviews from mainstream critics, indicating "generally unfavorable reviews".

Todd McCarthy of Variety called the film "a clunky, poorly constructed drama designed to spotlight the little-remarked role of black American soldiers in World War II." James Rocchi, writing for Cinematical, gave the film a mixed review: "When Miracle at St. Anna falters, it's in the moments that seem like they could have been crafted by any other film maker; when Miracle at St. Anna succeeds, it's in the moments that could only have been crafted by Lee." Ann Hornaday of The Washington Post wrote that the film was "overwrought, overproduced, overbusy and overlong" and that "Miracle at St. Anna finally suffers from the worst filmmaking sin of all: the failure of trust, in the story and the audience." Claudia Puig of USA Today wrote that the film "aspires to be epic, but mostly it's just unfocused, sprawling and badly in need of editing" and that "[i]t tries hard to be inspiring, but it has jarring tonal shifts, stereotyped characters and a lack of narrative perspective." Peter Travers of Rolling Stone described the film as "too long, lazily constructed, and crammed with too many characters and subplots for any director to develop fully outside of an HBO miniseries."

Despite a mostly negative reception, Miracle at St. Anna received some praise. Eric D. Snider, writing for Film.com praised the film, writing, "This is beyond the scope of anything Lee has done before, and he rises to the challenge remarkably well, with battle scenes nearly as visceral and jolting as those in Saving Private Ryan and a multi-layered story involving the U.S. Army, the Nazis, and the Italian resistance movement." Snider criticized the film's frame story, which he described as "unnecessary and definitely corny." James Verniere of the Boston Herald awarded the film an "A" grade, calling it a "masterpiece" and a "classic American WWII movie that both acknowledges the rousing tradition of such war epics as The Longest Day (1962) and The Big Red One (1980) and adds something new: paying tribute to the World War II African-American soldiers who made the ultimate sacrifice for their country". Roger Ebert, writing for the Chicago Sun-Times, criticized the editing but praised the film overall, describing it as "epic" with "one of the best battle scenes I can remember, on par with Saving Private Ryan...Miracle at St. Anna contains richness, anger, history, sentiment, fantasy, reality, violence and life. Maybe too much. Better than too little."

=== Controversy ===
Protests were scheduled for the film's Italian premiere in Viareggio, Italy, by unspecified organizations. The protesters objected to the plotline of a Partisan collaborating with the Nazis. This runs directly counter to the accepted historical version of events, ruled by an Italian military court in 2005, that the Sant'Anna di Stazzema massacre was entirely premeditated by the Germans with no reason except the aim to frighten the population. Giovanni Cipollini, deputy head of the National Association of the Italian Partisans, said the film was a "false reconstruction" and a "travesty of history". However, Lee, unrepentant, stated "I am not apologizing." He told Italians there was "a lot about your history you have yet to come to grips with. This film is our interpretation, and I stand behind it." McBride, the novel's author, stated: "As a black American, I understand what it's like for someone to tell your history... unfortunately, the history of World War Two here in Italy is ours as well, and this was the best I could do... it is, after all, a work of fiction.”

In light of the film's controversy, Lee was awarded honorary citizenship by the mayor of Stazzema, Michele Silicani, who defended the film, stating: "It's true that the film depicts a partisan who betrayed civilians. But above it is the tale of those partisans who fought to the death to defend civilians."

=== Litigation ===
Following the theatrical release of Miracle at St. Anna, Spike Lee and the Italian production company On My Own Produzioni Cinematografiche brought a lawsuit against TF1, alleging that the company failed in its contractual agreement with On My Own to distribute the film in international markets, excluding the United States, Canada and Italy. In its defense, TF1 refused to distribute Miracle at St. Anna, claiming that Lee had made a different film than the one promised, and refused to pay On My Own the €11 million advance needed to distribute the film internationally.

On June 21, 2011, a Paris court ruled in Lee and On My Own's favor, believing that TF1 failed to honor the contract, which proved "disastrous" for the film. TF1 was fined €32 million (US$46 million). TF1 was ordered to pay On My Own €20 million in damages, plus a further €1 million for moral prejudice; Lee was awarded €1 million, while screenwriter James McBride received €200,000; TF1 was also ordered to pay €13 million to BNP Paribas to cover the advance it had failed to pay.

In November 2016, trustees of below-the-line Hollywood unions filed a lawsuit against Lee and two of his production companies claiming Lee had failed to pay $45,000 in pension and other health contributions for the crew.

== See also ==
- 2008 in film
- List of World War II films
