= Joshua Caleb Johnson =

American actor

- Occupation: Actor
- Years active: 2016–present
- Notable work: The Good Lord Bird

Joshua Caleb Johnson is an American actor. After appearing in several television shows and short films, he gained attention when he starred as Henry 'Onion' Shackleford in the 2020 television series The Good Lord Bird.

== Filmography ==
=== Film ===
Year	Title	Role	Notes
2017	Ray Meets Helen	André	Feature film
2017	It's Just a Gun	Gabe	Short film
2019	Dark Chocolate	Tony Adams	Short film
2019	The Lost Sword	Stevie	Short film
2020	The Night They Came	Jaden	Short film
2021	Bingo Hell	Caleb	Feature film

=== Television ===
Year	Title	Role	Notes
2016	Animal Kingdom	Jack Emery	2 episodes
2019	Black-ish	Jalen	2 episodes
2020	The Good Lord Bird	Henry Shackleford	7 episodes
2021	Snowfall	Dwayne Baxter	3 episodes
2022	Women of the Movement	Wheeler Parker Jr.	2 episodes
2024	Genius	Teenage Malcolm X	1 episode

=== Video game ===
Year	Title	Role	Notes
2017	Madden NFL 18: Longshot	Young Devin Wade	

== Accolades ==
Year	Award	Category	Nominated work	Result	Ref.
2021	Critics' Choice Television Awards	Best Supporting Actor in a Limited Series or TV Movie	The Good Lord Bird	Nominated	
2021	Satellite Awards	Best Supporting Actor – Series, Miniseries or Television Film	The Good Lord Bird	Nominated	
