= Hugh Forbes (soldier) =

English mercenary (1808–1892)

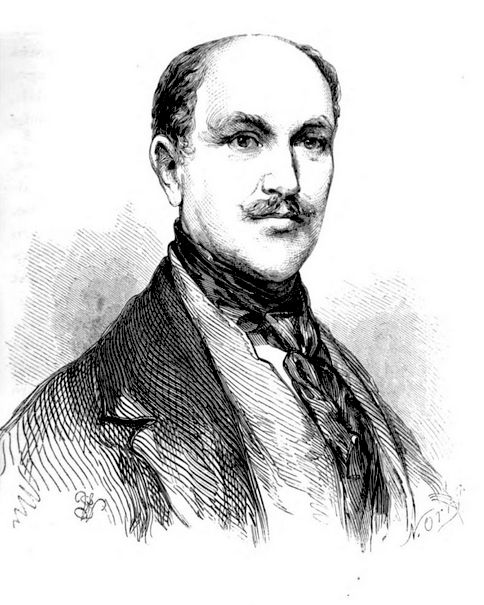
- Born: c. 1808
- Died: 22 July 1892 (aged 83–84)

Hugh Forbes (c. 1808–22 July 1892), known in Italy as Ugo Forbes, was an English mercenary involved in the revolutions of 1848 in the Italian states as a part of Giuseppe Garibaldi's forces, the preparation for John Brown's raid on Harper's Ferry, and later, the Sicilian Expedition of the Thousand (1860), again under Garibaldi.

Forbes was hired by John Brown to help train the group that would eventually execute the 1859 raid in Harper's Ferry, Virginia. He first met Brown in New York, and helped train John Brown's raiders in Tabor, Iowa in 1857, being paid a total of $600 for his services. However, a personal falling out with Brown over strategy and money led Forbes to reveal some of his plans to U.S. Senators William H. Seward and Henry Wilson before the raid.

As a participant in the Italian wars of unification, Forbes wrote several works encouraging nationalist revolutionary activity throughout Europe. Among these are his Manual for the patriotic volunteer on active service in regular and irregular war, which was printed in both English and Italian and circulated among Italian nationalists and radical abolitionists in the United States. In 1862, he attempted to publish a weekly journal aimed at volunteer militias, which was largely unsuccessful. In 1864, he would also publish a pamphlet on Polish nationalism. He appeared to have a friendship with George W. M. Reynolds, who would help promote his works. Forbes' family believes him to have written several letters published in Reynolds's Newspaper in the 1860s, under the pseudonym Gracchus.

== Publications ==
- Manual for the patriotic volunteer on active service in regular and irregular war (New York: W. H. Tinson, 1855, in two volumes. 2nd ed.)
  - Published as an abridged single volume, Extracts from the manual for the patriotic volunteer (New York: W. H. Tinson, 1857).
  - Published in Italian as Compendio del volontario patriottico tanto in guerra regolare che in guerra irregolare (Napoli: Stamperia Nazionale, 1860)

== See also ==
- Ilari, Virgilio; Castelli, Viviana (2022). Vita e tempi del colonnello Forbes (1808–1892): un inglese italianissimo tra Risorgimento e guerra civile americana [Life and times of Colonel Forbes (1808–1892): A very Italian Englishman, between the Risorgimento and the American Civil War]. Fucina di Marte (in Italian). Roma: Società italiana di storia militare, Nadir Media. ISBN 978-88-944369-6-9.
- Greene, Lida L. (April 1967). "Hugh Forbes, Soldier of Fortune". The Annals of Iowa. 38 (8): 610–611. doi:10.17077/0003-4827.7840. ISSN 0003-4827.
- Lause, Mark A. (20 April 2017). "Universal Democratic Republicans". A Secret Society History of the Civil War. Vol. 1. University of Illinois Press. doi:10.5406/illinois/9780252036552.003.0003. ISBN 9780252036552.
