= Last Tango in Paris =

1972 film directed by Bernardo Bertolucci

- Theatrical release poster
- Directed by: Bernardo Bertolucci
- Screenplay by: Bernardo Bertolucci; Franco Arcalli; Adaptation french dialogue: Agnès Varda
- Story by: Bernardo Bertolucci
- Produced by: Alberto Grimaldi
- Starring: Marlon Brando; Maria Schneider; Maria Michi; Giovanna Galletti; Jean-Pierre Léaud; Massimo Girotti
- Cinematography: Vittorio Storaro
- Edited by: Franco Arcalli
- Music by: Gato Barbieri
- Production companies: Produzioni Europee Associati (PEA); Les Productions Artistes Associés
- Distributed by: United Artists
- Release dates: 14 October 1972 (New York Film Festival); 15 December 1972 (France); 16 December 1972 (Italy)
- Running time: 129 minutes
- Countries: Italy; France
- Languages: English; French
- Budget: $1 million
- Box office: $96 million

Last Tango in Paris (Italian: Ultimo tango a Parigi; French: Le Dernier Tango à Paris) is a 1972 erotic drama film directed by Bernardo Bertolucci. The film stars Marlon Brando, Maria Schneider and Jean-Pierre Léaud, and portrays a recently widowed American who begins an anonymous sexual relationship with a young Parisian woman.

The film premiered at the New York Film Festival on 14 October 1972 and grossed $36 million in its U.S. theatrical release, making it the seventh highest-grossing film of 1973. The film's raw portrayal of rape and emotional turmoil led to international controversy and drew various levels of government censorship in different jurisdictions. Upon release in the United States, the MPAA gave the film an X rating. United Artists Classics released an R-rated cut in 1981. In 1997, the original cut of the film was reclassified as NC-17.

== Plot ==
Paul, a middle-aged American hotel owner mourning the suicide of his wife Rosa, meets a young, engaged Parisian woman named Jeanne at an apartment that both are interested in renting. Paul takes the apartment after they begin an anonymous sexual relationship there. He insists that they not share any personal information, even given names, much to Jeanne's dismay. At one point in their relationship, he anally rapes her using butter as lubricant. Despite this, she tells him that she tries to leave him, but can't bring herself to do it. The affair of Paul and Jeanne continues for some time until Paul decides to leave Jeanne, after which she arrives at the apartment and finds that he has packed up and left without warning.

After attending his wife's viewing, Paul meets Jeanne on the street and says he wants to renew the relationship. He tells her of the recent tragedy of his wife. As he tells his life story, they walk into a tango bar, where he continues telling her about himself. The loss of anonymity disillusions Jeanne about their relationship. She tells Paul she does not want to see him again. Paul, not wanting to let Jeanne go, chases her through the streets of Paris. While running, she continually yells at him to go away and tells him that their relationship is over. Despite her threats to call the police, he chases her all the way back to her building where she is living with her mother and forces his way into her apartment. He mocks her for running away from him, followed by him saying he loves her and wants to know her name.

Jeanne takes a gun from a drawer. She tells Paul her name and shoots him. Paul staggers out onto the balcony, mortally wounded, and collapses. As Paul dies, Jeanne, dazed, mutters to herself that he was just a stranger who tried to rape her and she did not know who he was, as if in a rehearsal preparing herself for questioning by the police.

== Cast ==
- Marlon Brando as Paul, an American expatriate, hotel owner
- Maria Schneider as Jeanne, a young Parisian woman
- Jean-Pierre Léaud as Thomas, a film director and Jeanne's fiancé
- Maria Michi as Rosa's mother
- Massimo Girotti as Marcel, Rosa's former lover
- Giovanna Galletti as the prostitute, an old acquaintance of Rosa
- Catherine Allégret as Catherine, a maid at Paul and Rosa's hotel
- Gitt Magrini as Jeanne's mother
- Luce Marquand as Olympia, Jeanne's former childhood nurse
- Dan Diament as the TV sound engineer
- Catherine Sola as the script girl
- Mauro Marchetti as the TV cameraman
- Peter Schommer as the TV assistant cameraman
- Catherine Breillat as Mouchette, a dressmaker
- Marie-Hélène Breillat as Monique, a dressmaker
- Darling Légitimus as the Concierge
- Veronica Lazăr as Rosa, Paul's deceased wife
- Armand Abplanalp as the prostitute's client
- Rachel Kesterber as Christine
- Ramón Mendizábal as the Tango orchestra leader
- Mimi Pinson as the President of Tango jury
- Gérard Lepennec as the tall furniture mover
- Stéphane Koziak as the short furniture mover
- Michel Delahaye (scenes deleted) as the Bible salesman
- Laura Betti (scenes deleted) as Miss Blandish
- Jean-Luc Bideau (scenes deleted) as the Barge Captain
- Gianni Pulone (scenes deleted)
- Franca Sciutto (scenes deleted)

== Production ==
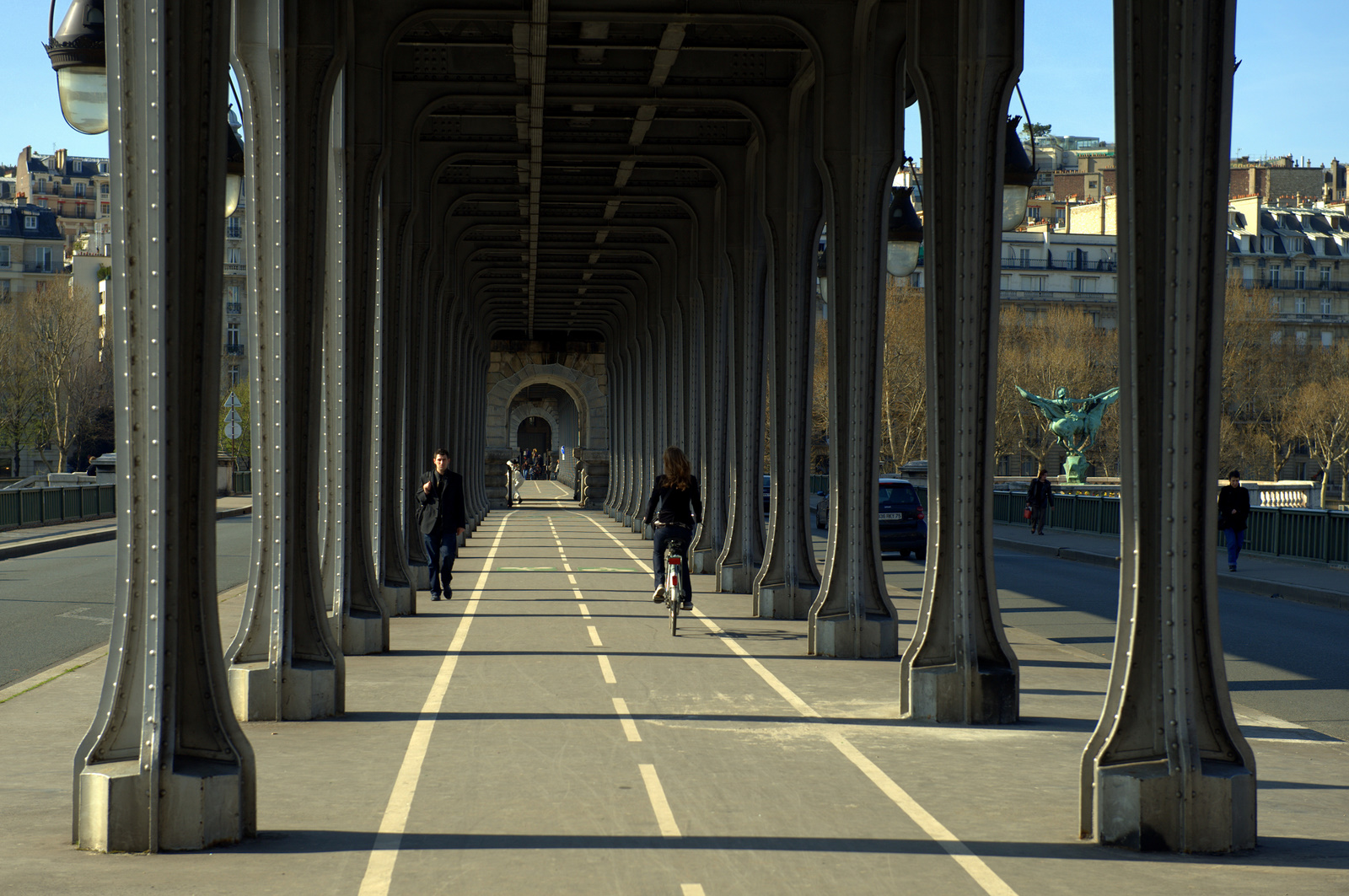
The Pont de Bir-Hakeim in Paris, where numerous scenes were shot

Bernardo Bertolucci developed the film from his sexual fantasies: "He once dreamed of seeing a beautiful nameless woman on the street and having sex with her without ever knowing who she was." The screenplay was by Bertolucci, Franco Arcalli, and Agnès Varda (additional dialogue). It was later adapted as a novel by Robert Alley. The film was directed by Bertolucci with cinematography by Vittorio Storaro.

Bertolucci originally intended to cast Dominique Sanda, who developed the idea with him, and Jean-Louis Trintignant. Trintignant refused and, when Brando accepted, Sanda was pregnant and decided not to do the film. Brando received a percentage of the gross for the film and was estimated to have earned $3 million.

Maria Schneider stated in 2001 that her role in the original script was intended to be played by a boy.

According to American artist Andy Warhol, Last Tango was based on Warhol's own Blue Movie film released a few years earlier in 1969.

=== Butter rape scene controversy ===
The film contains a scene in which Paul anally rapes Jeanne using butter as a lubricant. While the rape was supposed to be staged, the part where the butter is used was not. Only Brando and Bertolucci knew it beforehand, and Schneider said the scene still had a tremendously negative effect on her. In a 2006 interview, Schneider said that the use of butter was not in the script and that "when they told me, I had a burst of anger. Woo! I threw everything. And nobody can force someone to do something not in the script. But I didn't know that. I was too young." In 2007, Schneider recounted feelings of sexual humiliation pertaining to the rape scene:

They only told me about it before we had to film the scene and I was so angry. I should have called my agent or had my lawyer come to the set because you can't force someone to do something that isn't in the script, but at the time, I didn't know that. Marlon said to me: 'Maria, don't worry, it's just a movie', but during the scene, even though what Marlon was doing wasn't real, I was crying real tears. I felt humiliated and to be honest, I felt a little raped, both by Marlon and by Bertolucci. After the scene, Marlon didn't console me or apologize. Thankfully, there was just one take.

In the same interview, she also joked about it, laughingly mentioning that her pleasures in those days were very simple:

I like to see friends and go to the market and cook. But I never use butter to cook any more. Only olive oil.

She claimed that Brando and Bertolucci "made a fortune" from the film while she made very little money. She also acknowledged that:

"I felt very sad because I was treated like a sex symbol - I wanted to be recognised as an actress and the whole scandal and aftermath of the film turned me a little crazy and I had a breakdown.

Schneider died in 2011. In February 2013, Bertolucci spoke about the film's effect on Schneider in an interview on the Dutch television show College Tour, saying that although the rape scene was in the script, the detail of using butter as a lubricant was improvised the day of shooting and Schneider did not know about the use of the butter beforehand. Bertolucci said that "I feel guilty, but I don't regret it." In September 2013, Bertolucci spoke again about the scene at a retrospective at the Cinémathèque Française, claiming that the scene was in the script but the use of butter was not. Bertolucci said that he and Brando "decided not to say anything to Maria to get a more realistic response".

In November 2016, a slightly different version of the 2013 College Tour interview was uploaded to YouTube by the Spanish non-profit El Mundo de Alycia on the International Day for the Elimination of Violence against Women, accompanied by a statement concluding that the scene "abused [Schneider] psychologically and, who knows if also, physically..." This gained attention when Yahoo! Movies writer Tom Butler wrote an article about it, prompting several celebrities to condemn the film and Bertolucci; a number of newspapers picked up on the story, falsely reporting that Bertolucci had confessed that Schneider was raped on set, prompting Bertolucci to release a statement, saying that according to him the rape was "simulated" even though they never had a prior agreement on the use of butter.

Bertolucci also shot a scene which showed Brando's genitals, but explained in 1973, "I had so identified myself with Brando that I cut it out of shame for myself. To show him naked would have been like showing me naked." Schneider declared in an interview that "Marlon said he felt raped and manipulated by it and he was 48. And he was Marlon Brando!" Brando refused to speak to Bertolucci for 15 years after the production was completed. Bertolucci said:

I was thinking that it was like a dialogue where he was really answering my questions in a way. When at the end of the movie, when he saw it, I discovered that he realized what we were doing, that he was delivering so much of his own experience. And he was very upset with me, and I told him, "Listen, you are a grown-up. Older than me. Didn't you realize what you were doing?" And he didn't talk to me for years.

=== Francis Bacon influence ===
Double Portrait of Lucian Freud and Frank Auerbach (left side, oil on canvas, 1964)

Study for a Portrait of Isabel Rawsthorne (oil on canvas, 1964)

An art lover, Bertolucci drew inspiration from the works of the Irish-born British artist Francis Bacon for the opening sequence of cast and crew credits. The film's opening credits include two paintings by Bacon: Double Portrait of Lucian Freud and Frank Auerbach and Study for a Portrait of Isabel Rawsthorne. The hues used in the film were inspired by the paintings of Bacon. During pre-production, Bertolucci frequently visited an exhibit of Bacon's paintings at the Grand Palais in Paris; he said that the light and colour in Bacon's paintings reminded him of Paris in the winter, when

the lights of the stores are on, and there is a very beautiful contrast between the leaden gray of the wintry sky and the warmth of the show windows...the light in the paintings was the major source of inspiration for the style we were looking for.

Bacon's painting style often depicted human skin like raw meat and the painter's inspiration included meat hanging in a butcher shops window and human skin diseases.

Cinematographer Vittorio Storaro had previously worked with Bertolucci on The Conformist and often used an azure hue in the film. Storaro later told a reporter that

after The Conformist I had a moment of crisis; I was asking myself: what can come after azure?...I did not have the slightest idea that an orange film could be born. We needed another kind of emotion...It was the case of Last Tango.

For Last Tango in Paris, Bertolucci and Storaro took inspiration from Bacon's paintings by using "rich oranges, light and cool grays, icy whites, and occasional reds combine[d] with Bertolucci's own tasteful choices of soft browns, blond browns, and delicate whites with bluish and pink shadings".

Bertolucci took Marlon Brando to the Bacon exhibit and told Brando that he "wanted him to compare himself with Bacon's human figures because I felt that, like them, Marlon's face and body were characterized by a strange and infernal plasticity. I wanted Paul to be like the figures that obsessively return in Bacon: faces eaten by something coming from the inside."

=== Brando's lines ===
As was his practice in previous films, Brando refused to memorize his lines for many of the scenes. Instead, he wrote his lines on cue cards and posted them around the set, leaving Bertolucci with the problem of keeping them out of the picture frame. During his long monologue over the body of his wife, for example, Brando's dramatic lifting of his eyes upward is not spontaneous dramatic acting but a search for his next cue card. Brando asked Bertolucci if he could "write lines on Maria's rear end", which the director rejected.

== Soundtrack ==
Last Tango in Paris

Soundtrack album by Gato Barbieri
- Released: 1973
- Recorded: 20–25 November 1972; Rome Italy
- Genre: Film score
- Labels: United Artists; UA-LA-045-F
- Producer: Alberto Grimaldi

Gato Barbieri chronology
Under Fire (1971)	Last Tango in Paris (1973)	Bolivia (1973)

Professional ratings
Review scores
Source	Rating
AllMusic	5/5 stars

The film score was composed by Gato Barbieri, arranged and conducted by Oliver Nelson, and the soundtrack album was released on the United Artists label. AllMusic's Richie Unterberger noted "Although some of the smoky sax solos get a little uncomfortably close to 1970s fusion cliché, Gato Barbieri's score to Bertolucci's 1972 classic is an overall triumph. Suspenseful jazz, melancholy orchestration, and actual tangos fit the film's air of erotic longing, melancholy despair, and doomed fate". The soundtrack includes "Six Penny Ride" by Trevor Duncan (1924-2005).

=== Track listing ===
All compositions by Gato Barbieri.

1. "Last Tango in Paris - Tango" – 3:23
2. "Jeanne" – 2:34
3. "Girl in Black - Tango (Para mi Negra)" – 2:06
4. "Last Tango in Paris - Ballad" – 3:43
5. "Fake Ophelia" – 2:57
6. "Picture in the Rain" – 1:51
7. "Return - Tango (La Vuelta)" – 3:04
8. "It's Over" – 3:15
9. "Goodbye (Un Largo Adios)" – 2:32
10. "Why Did She Choose You?" – 3:00
11. "Last Tango in Paris - Jazz Waltz" – 5:44

=== Personnel ===
- Gato Barbieri – tenor saxophone, flute, vocal
- Franco D'Andrea – piano
- Franco Goldani, Wolmer Beltrani – accordion
- Jean-François Jenny-Clark, Giovanni Tommaso – bass
- Pierino Munari – drums
- Afonso Vieira – percussion, berimbau
- Ivanir "Mandrake" do Nascimento – percussion, tambourine
- Orchestra arranged and conducted by Oliver Nelson

== Reception ==
The film premiered as the closing film at the New York Film Festival on 14 October 1972, with high demand and enormous public controversy. The film did not have any press screenings due to concerns that the film was being shown against Italian law after the Italian censors had not passed the film. The lack of screenings increased demand for the film with some offering $100 to buy a ticket.

The film opened in late 1972 in France, where filmgoers stood in two-hour queues for the first month of its run at the seven cinemas where it was screened. It gained unanimous positive reviews in every major French publication. To circumvent Spanish state censorship, thousands of Spaniards travelled hundreds of kilometers to reach French cinemas in Biarritz and Perpignan where Tango was playing. Following that, it was released in the United States, United Kingdom, and other venues.

The film generated considerable controversy because of its subject and graphic portrayal of sex. Schneider provided frank interviews in the wake of Tango's controversy, claiming she had slept with 50 men and 20 women, that she was "bisexual completely", and that she had used heroin, cocaine, and marijuana. She also said of Bertolucci, "He's quite clever and more free and very young. Everybody was digging what he was doing, and we were all very close."

During the publicity for the film's release, Bertolucci said Schneider developed an "Oedipal fixation with Brando". Schneider said Brando sent her flowers after they first met, and "from then on he was like a daddy". In a later interview, Schneider denied this, saying, "Brando tried to be very paternalistic with me, but it really wasn't any father-daughter relationship." However, in 2007, she said that "for me, he was more like a father figure and I a daughter."

In Italy, the film was released on 15 December 1972, grossing an unprecedented $100,000 in six days. One week later, however, police seized all copies on the order of a prosecutor, who defined the film as "self-serving pornography", and its director was put on trial for "obscenity". Following first degree and appeal trials, the fate of the film was sealed on 26 January 1976 by the Italian Supreme Court, which sentenced all copies to be destroyed (though some were preserved by the National Film Library). Bertolucci was served with a four-month suspended sentence in prison and had his civil rights revoked for five years, depriving him of voting rights. It grossed 7 billion lire ($3.9 million) in its initial release in Italy. It was re-released in 1987 where it grossed an additional 5 billion lire ($2.7 million). In 2000, it was listed as the second-highest grossing Italian film in Italy adjusted for inflation.

=== Response in United States ===
October 14, 1972... should become a landmark in movie history comparable to May 29, 1913—the night Le Sacre du Printemps was first performed—in music history... Last Tango in Paris has the same kind of hypnotic excitement as the Sacre, the same primitive force, and the same thrusting, jabbing eroticism. The movie breakthrough has finally come.

— Pauline Kael

The film opened February 1, 1973 at the Trans-Lux East in New York City with a $5 ticket price and advance sales of $100,000, grossing $41,280 in its first week. The media frenzy surrounding the film generated intense popular interest as well as moral condemnation, and the film was featured in cover stories in both Time and Newsweek magazines. Playboy published a photo spread of Brando and Schneider "cavorting in the nude". Time wrote,

Any moviegoers who are not shocked, titillated, disgusted, fascinated, delighted or angered by this early scene in Bernardo Bertolucci's new movie, Last Tango in Paris, should be patient. There is more to come. Much more.

The Village Voice reported walkouts by board members and "vomiting by well-dressed wives". Columnist William F. Buckley and ABC's Harry Reasoner denounced the film as "pornography disguised as art".

After local government officials failed to ban the film in Montclair, New Jersey, theatergoers had to push through a mob of 200 outraged residents, who hurled epithets like "perverts" and "homos" at the attendees. Later, a bomb threat temporarily halted the showing. The New York City chapter of the National Organization for Women denounced the film as a tool of "male domination".

The film's scandal centred mostly on an anal rape scene, featuring Paul's use of butter as a lubricant. According to Schneider, the scene was not in the original script, but was Brando's idea. Other critics focused on when the character Paul asks Jeanne to insert her fingers in his anus, then asks her to prove her devotion to him by, among other things, having sex with a pig. Vincent Canby of The New York Times described the film's sexual content as the artistic expression of the "era of Norman Mailer and Germaine Greer" and was upset about the high ticket price.

Film critic Pauline Kael endorsed the film, writing that "Tango has altered the face of an art form. This is a movie people will be arguing about for as long as there are movies." She called it "the most powerfully erotic movie ever made, and it may turn out to be the most liberating movie ever made." United Artists reprinted the whole of Kael's rave as a double-page advertisement in the Sunday New York Times. Kael's review of Last Tango in Paris is regarded as the most influential piece of her career.

Many feminist film critics disliked the film. In a 1974 review in Jump Cut, E. Ann Kaplan criticized it for featuring "a one-sided relationship seen mostly through Paul's eyes." In Women and Their Sexuality in the New Film, (1974) one of the first explicitly feminist books on film, Joan Mellen complains about a similar issue, that Jeanne constantly gives way to Paul, "the man who is made more interesting in every way." However, a few did enjoy it, such as Molly Haskell, who responded to feminist criticism in From Reverence to Rape: The Treatment of Women in the Movies (1974) by noting that women more than men seemed to respond to the film, and that female sexual fantasies can include "rape, sadism, submission, liberation, and anonymous sex."

The American critic Roger Ebert repeatedly described Kael's review as "the most famous movie review ever published", and he added the film to his Great Movies collection. American director Robert Altman expressed unqualified praise: "I walked out of the screening and said to myself, 'How dare I make another film?' My personal and artistic life will never be the same."

Review aggregation website Rotten Tomatoes retrospectively collected 43 reviews and gave the film an approval rating of 81%, with an average rating of 8/10. The website's critical consensus reads, "Naturalistic but evocative, Last Tango in Paris is a vivid exploration of pain, love, and sex featuring a typically towering Marlon Brando performance." Metacritic, which uses a weighted average, assigned the film a score of 77 out of 100, based on 6 critics, indicating "generally favorable" reviews.

In 2004, director Martin Scorsese compared this "towering Brando performance" to the actor's turn as Terry Malloy in On the Waterfront (1954) and noted that "[w]hen you watch his work in ... Last Tango in Paris, you're watching the purest poetry imaginable, in dynamic motion".

Ethan Hawke considered Brando's work a seminal moment in the movement of performance. Praising both the star and the director of the film, Hawke told Richard Linklater and Louis Black that, "Brando upped [On the Waterfront] with Last Tango." Pauline Kael, in her aforementioned review, had echoed the same sentiments by saying, "On the screen Brando is our genius as [Norman] Mailer is our genius in literature … Paul feels so 'real' and the character is brought so close that a new dimension in screen acting has been reached."

Richard Brody of The New Yorker praised the personal nature of Brando's role, commenting in his review of Listen to Me Marlon (2015) that,

"When Brando said what he himself had to say, it was indeed of a unique value. That's why the best of Brando is when he's closest to himself, as in ... Bernardo Bertolucci's Last Tango in Paris, from 1972. It isn't only his words that are better than those of the screenwriters; his persona, his character, is greater than those that are scripted."

In 2019, actor Brad Pitt said the film from the past he'd most like to have starred in is Last Tango in Paris, "Brando. That one hurts." Premiere had named Brando's performance the 27th-greatest film performance of all time in April 2006.

The film was given a nationwide release on February 7, 1973, and grossed $36 million in the United States and Canada, the seventh highest-grossing film of 1973.

=== Other international responses ===
British censors reduced the duration of the sodomy sequence before permitting the film to be released in the United Kingdom, though it is not cut in later releases. Mary Whitehouse, a Christian morality campaigner, expressed outrage that the film had been certified "X" rather than banned outright, and Labour MP Maurice Edelman denounced the classification as "a licence to degrade".

The film was censored in Spain during the Franco regime and was not released until December 1977. Chile banned the film entirely for nearly thirty years under its military dictatorship, and the film was similarly suppressed in Portugal, until the Carnation Revolution in 1974, when its première became an example of the freedom democracy allows. The same happened in Brazil during the period of military dictatorship when the film was censored, until it was finally released in 1979. Other countries that banned it include Argentina, South Korea, Singapore, and Venezuela.

In Australia, the film was released uncut with an R certificate by the Australian Classification Board on 1 February 1973. It received a VHS release by Warner Home Video with the same classification on 1 January 1987, forbidding sale or hire to anyone under the age of 18.

In Canada, the film was banned by the Nova Scotia Board of Censors, leading to the landmark 1978 Supreme Court of Canada split decision in Nova Scotia (Board of Censors) v McNeil, which upheld the provinces' right to censor films.

=== Legacy ===
Being Maria, a film based on Maria Schneider's experiences working on Last Tango in Paris, was released in 2024, having its premiere at the 77th Cannes Film Festival. The film was directed by Jessica Palud and adapted from Vanessa Schneider's 2018 memoir My Cousin Maria Schneider.

Also released in 2024, the biopic Waltzing with Brando depicts the period between 1969 and 1974 in which Brando was preparing to star in The Godfather and Last Tango in Paris.

=== Cinémathèque française screening controversy ===
In December 2024, a planned screening of Last Tango in Paris at the Parisian theater Cinémathèque française was cancelled after women's rights groups protested the showing due to the film's infamous rape scene. French actress Judith Godrèche also protested the theater's decision to show the film without context given to the rape scene, writing on Instagram: "It’s time to wake up, dear Cinémathèque, and restore humanity to a 19-year-old actor by behaving humanely." The cinema's director, Frédéric Bonnaud, stated that the decision to pull the film was because "We are a cinema, not a fortress. We cannot take risks with the safety of our staff and audience," and stated that "Violent individuals were beginning to make threats and holding this screening and debate posed an entirely disproportionate risk." His statements led to further criticism from feminist groups, who accused him as posing as a victim, and stating he should have instead apologized for wanting to screen the film to begin with. The 50/50 Collective, another women's rights group, had called on the Cinématheque to provide "thoughtful and respectful" place for Schneider’s testimony and experience alongside the screening. Other feminists stated they would have approved of the screening had a discussion been had after the screening and a note handed to the viewers describing the non-consensual background of the scene.

=== Accolades ===
In 2002, the film ranked #48 on AFI's 100 Years... 100 Passions.

Accolades for Last Tango in Paris
Organization	Year	Category	Recipient(s)	Result	Ref.
Academy Awards	1974	Best Director	Bernardo Bertolucci	Nominated	
Academy Awards	1974	Best Actor	Marlon Brando	Nominated	
British Academy Film Awards	1974	Best Actor in a Leading Role	Marlon Brando	Nominated	
David di Donatello Awards	1973	Special David	Maria Schneider	Won	
Directors Guild of America Awards	1974	Outstanding Directing in a Feature Film	Bernardo Bertolucci	Nominated	
Golden Globe Awards	1974	Best Motion Picture – Drama	Last Tango in Paris	Nominated	
Golden Globe Awards	1974	Best Director	Bernardo Bertolucci	Nominated	
Grammy Awards	1974	Best Score Soundtrack for Visual Media	Gato Barbieri	Nominated	
Grammy Awards	1974	Best Instrumental Composition	Gato Barbieri (for "Theme from Last Tango in Paris")	Won	
Nastro d'Argento Awards	1973	Best Director	Bernardo Bertolucci	Won	
National Society of Film Critics Awards	1974	Best Actor	Marlon Brando	Won	
New York Film Critics Circle Awards	1974	Best Actor	Marlon Brando	Won	

== See also ==
- List of cult films
- List of NC-17 rated films

== Bibliography ==
- Arcalli, Franco; Bertolucci, Bernardo (1972). Bernardo Bertolucci's Last Tango in Paris, the screenplay. New York: Delacorte Press.
- Tonetti, Claretta Micheletti (1995). Bernardo Bertolucci, The Cinema of Ambiguity. New York: Twayne Publishers. ISBN 0-8057-9313-5.
