= Sofia Masson =

American actress

- Born: New York City, New York
- Occupation: Actress
- Years active: 2019–present

Sofia Masson is a Brazilian-American actress. She is best known for playing Maria Schneider in the biographical film Waltzing with Brando and Maddie in the drama film Every Day.

== Early life ==
Masson was born in New York City to a Brazilian mother and American father. She attended elementary school in Berlin. She credited music and dance for her helping her settle into the culture. The family returned to the states relocating in Miami where she performed in her first major musical production at the Miami Children’s Theatre Company. The family moved back to her hometown of New York. In middle school she was heavily influenced by Tennessee Williams, Anton Chekhov and William Shakespeare. She studied theatre and film at McGill University in Montreal.

== Career ==
Masson started acting professionally in 2020. One of her first big roles came playing Maddie in the drama film Every Day starring Vivica A. Fox. She played Kayla in the thriller film On the Run. After the first screening she did a Q&A and was joined onstage by Pricila Vilaca and Jenny Rosen, both of whom work with Martha’s Vineyard Community Services’ Connect to End Violence, a domestic violence program and rape crisis center. She said the role was emotionally draining Her biggest role so far has been portraying Maria Schneider in the drama film Waltzing with Brando. She also played Ariel in the erotic thriller film Fatal Exposure.

== Personal life ==
She is a classically trained dancer and singer. She likes practicing Yoga in her free time and calls herself a big foodie.

== Filmography ==
=== Film ===
Year	Title	Role	Notes
2019	Don't Write Me Off	Jean	Short
2021	Lucy	Lucy	Short
2021	The Wrong Cheer Captain	Anna	
2021	Heart of Mine	Sofia	Short
2021	Aliens on Halloween	Sharona	
2022	Dangerous Love	Hannah	
2022	The Thrill	Mary	Short
2022	The Mysterious Marcus Brady	Ally	Short
2022	Remember Me: The Mahalia Jackson Story	Cafe Waitress	
2022	Girls Getaway Gone Wrong 2	Brooklyn	
2022	Before It Ends	Eve	
2023	The Last Deal	Sofia	Short
2023	Castaways	Cara	
2023	Adam's Song	Alyssa	
2023	Takers	Kara	Short
2023	Storage	Allison	Short
2024	On the Run	Kayla	
2024	Every Day	Maddie	
2024	Waltzing with Brando	Jeanne	
2025	Fatal Exposure	Ariel	
2025	The Lemurian Candidate	Cecilia	

=== Television ===
Year	Title	Role	Notes
2019	The Lines That Bind	Casey Tiner	Episode; Before Vegas
2020	The Rap Pops	Brit Pop	Episode; Rap Around the World
