= Being Maria =

2024 film by Jessica Palud

- Theatrical release poster
- Directed by: Jessica Palud
- Screenplay by: Jessica Palud; Laurette Polmanss
- Based on: My Cousin Maria Schneider by Vanessa Schneider
- Produced by: Marielle Duigou
- Starring: Anamaria Vartolomei; Céleste Brunnquell; Giuseppe Maggio; Yvan Attal; Marie Gillain; Jonathan Couzinié; Matt Dillon
- Cinematography: Sébastien Buchmann
- Edited by: Thomas Marchand
- Music by: Benjamin Biolay
- Production companies: Les Films de Mina; StudioCanal; Moteur S'il Vous Plaît; Cinema Inutile
- Distributed by: Haut et Court
- Release dates: 21 May 2024 (Cannes); 19 June 2024 (France)
- Running time: 102 minutes
- Country: France
- Language: French
- Box office: $2.3 million

Being Maria (French: Maria) is a 2024 French biographical drama film directed by Jessica Palud from a screenplay by Palud and Laurette Polmanss, freely adapted from Vanessa Schneider's 2018 memoir My Cousin Maria Schneider. It is about the actress Maria Schneider (1952–2011) and dramatizes her experiences working on Bernardo Bertolucci's feature film Last Tango in Paris (1972). It stars Anamaria Vartolomei in the title role, with Céleste Brunnquell, Giuseppe Maggio, Yvan Attal, Marie Gillain, Jonathan Couzinié and Matt Dillon (playing Marlon Brando) in supporting roles.

It had its world premiere in the non-competitive Cannes Premiere section at the 77th Cannes Film Festival on 21 May 2024. It was theatrically released on 19 June 2024 by Haut et Court.

== Plot ==
19-year-old Maria Schneider, daughter of French actor Daniel Gélin, features in the 1972 erotic drama Last Tango in Paris by Italian director Bernardo Bertolucci. In the work she stars alongside the celebrated American actor Marlon Brando. The story follows an older American man who meets a young French woman in an apartment in Paris where they begin an anonymous sexual relationship. Maria becomes a star overnight through the role of Jeanne, but is unprepared for the fame and scandal that the film triggers.

== Cast ==
- Anamaria Vartolomei as Maria Schneider
- Céleste Brunnquell as Noor
- Giuseppe Maggio as Bernardo Bertolucci
- Yvan Attal as Daniel Gélin
- Marie Gillain as Marie-Christine Schneider
- Jonathan Couzinié as Michel Schneider
- Stanislas Merhar as Berhmann, a talent agent
- Judith Henry as Judith
- Hugo Becker as Marc, a director
- Anne Suarez as Hélène
- Matt Dillon as Marlon Brando

== Production ==
Jessica Palud and Laurette Polmanss freely adapted the film's screenplay from Vanessa Schneider's memoir My Cousin Maria Schneider, which was published in 2018 by (Éditions Grasset). Marielle Duigou produced the film for Les Films de Mina, with co-production by StudioCanal, Moteur S'il Vous Plaît and Cinema Inutile.

Principal photography began on 29 May 2023 in Paris. Filming continued in the Brittany region. With a total of 25 days of shooting, 10 days took place in the Ille-et-Vilaine department including in Rennes and Saint-Germain-du-Pinel, and at the Château d'Apigné in Le Rheu, the Résidence Oberthür in Rennes, and a beach in Dinard. Filming wrapped in Brittany on 30 June 2023. Post-production took place in Rennes. Anamaria Vartolomei described it as the most difficult role she has filmed for and said she experienced an "emotional release" when production concluded.

== Release ==
The film was selected to be screened in the non-competitive Cannes Premiere section at the 77th Cannes Film Festival, where it had its world premiere on 21 May 2024.

The film was theatrically released in France on 19 June 2024 by Haut et Court. International sales were handled by StudioCanal. Kino Lorber gave the film a limited theatrical release in the United States beginning on 21 March 2025, at the Quad Cinema in New York City.

== Critical response ==
On the review aggregator website Rotten Tomatoes, 60% of 35 critics' reviews are positive. Being Maria received an average rating of 3.2 out of 5 stars on the French website AlloCiné, based on 26 reviews.

== See also ==
- Waltzing with Brando, a 2024 biopic starring Billy Zane as Brando
