= Waltzing with Brando =

American biopic film

- Theatrical release poster
- Directed by: Bill Fishman
- Screenplay by: Bill Fishman
- Based on: Waltzing with Brando: Planning a Paradise in Tahiti by Bernard Judge
- Produced by: Bill Fishman; Billy Zane; Dean Bloxom; Doug Dearth; Brett Kerr
- Starring: Billy Zane; Jon Heder; Richard Dreyfuss; Camille Razat; Alaina Huffman; Tia Carrere; James Jagger
- Cinematography: Garrett O'Brien
- Edited by: Michael Yanovich
- Music by: Matei Bratescot
- Production company: Filmin'Tahiti
- Distributed by: Iconic Events Releasing
- Release dates: November 30, 2024 (Torino); September 19, 2025 (United States)
- Running time: 104 minutes
- Country: United States
- Language: English

Waltzing with Brando is a 2024 American biographical drama film directed by Bill Fishman and starring Billy Zane as Marlon Brando, alongside Jon Heder, Richard Dreyfuss, Camille Razat, Alaina Huffman, Tia Carrere, and James Jagger.

== Premise ==
The film is set primarily from 1969 and 1974, during which Marlon Brando was preparing to star in The Godfather and Last Tango in Paris while making plans with Bernard Judge to create a paradise getaway on Tahiti.

== Cast ==
- Billy Zane as Marlon Brando
- Jon Heder as Bernard Judge
- Richard Dreyfuss as Seymour Kraft
- Camille Razat as Michele
- Alaina Huffman as Dana
- Tia Carrere as Madame Leroy
- James Jagger as Zeke Knight
- Rob Corddry as Jack Bellin
- Sofia Masson as Maria Schneider
- Woody Fu as Alec Ata
- David Guierera as Francis Ford Coppola
- Jessica Rizo as Sacheen Littlefeather
- Charles Venturi as Bernardo Bertolucci

== Production ==
The film is written and directed by Bill Fishman and adapted from the memoir Waltzing with Brando: Planning a Paradise in Tahiti by Bernard Judge. The film is produced by Fishman, Billy Zane, who also stars, and Dean Bloxom. Principal photography took place mainly in Tetiaroa, where Marlon Brando and Judge tried to introduce sustainable architecture and practices.

Billy Zane was interviewed about playing the role of Marlon Brando in the film in January 2019 and described how he was not previously "aware of his passion for environmental rights, which was so prescient and so timely" and that he "wanted to celebrate the man for being a forward-thinker" and that he was "interested in teaching people about him in a way that they're not familiar while still mining the drama”.

The New York Post reported that the producers were at the Cannes Film Festival in 2024 looking for a buyer for the film. In November 2024, Jon Heder, Richard Dreyfuss, Camille Razat, Alaina Huffman, Tia Carrere, and James Jagger were revealed to have joined the cast.

== Release ==
Waltzing with Brando premiered at the closing night of the 2024 Torino Film Festival, on November 30, 2024. The film was released theatrically in the United States on September 19, 2025, by Iconic Events Releasing.

== Reception ==
On the review aggregator website Rotten Tomatoes, 56% of 34 critics' reviews are positive, with an average rating of 5.2/10. The website's consensus reads: "Anchored by Billy Zane's remarkable performance, Waltzing with Brando is a sporadically engaging yet tonally uneven portrait of Hollywood excess that charms in moments but falters in emotional resonance." Metacritic, which uses a weighted average, assigned the film a score of 40 out of 100, based on 4 critics, indicating "mixed or average" reviews.

The makeup and hairstyling of the film was honored by making the shortlist of nominees at the 97th Academy Awards while also receiving a nomination at the 4th Astra Creative Arts Awards.

== See also ==
- Being Maria, a 2024 biographical film starring Matt Dillon as Brando
