= Château de Villette =

Château in Île-de-France, France

Coordinates: 49°1′55″N 1°56′22″E

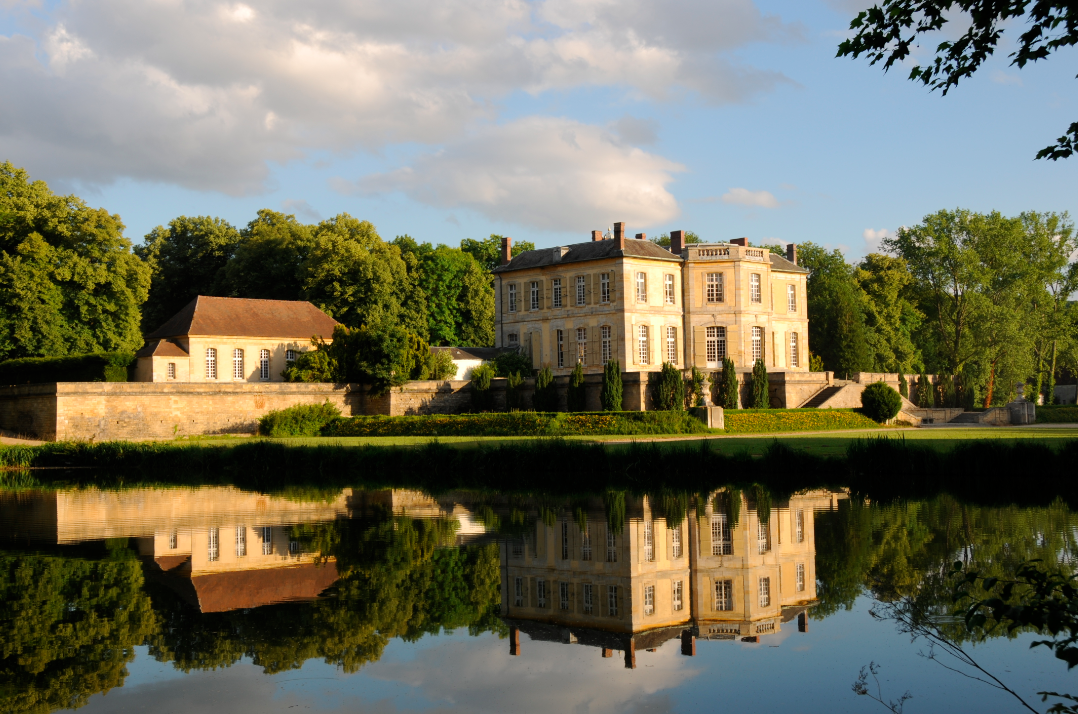
A view of the Château de Villette

The Château de Villette (French pronunciation: [ʃato d(ə) vilɛt]) is a château (a French manor house) located in Condécourt, France, 40 km (24.8 mi) northwest of Paris. There are numerous outbuildings including a chapel and adjacent reception room, horse stable and greenhouse.

== History ==
More than 185 acres (75 ha) of garden were designed by André Le Nôtre and spread out behind the château in the central axis with two rectangular lakes filled with swans, ducks, birds and fishes, as well as a cascade and fountain that resembles the one at Louis XIV's Château de Marly, surmounted by Neptune. The grounds provide outdoor activities for the château guests, including jogging, biking, and hunting. There is also a swimming pool and a tennis court. Jules Hardouin-Mansart and Le Nôtre designed the Palace of Versailles at the same time as they designed the Château de Villette in the 1680s. Therefore, Villette was nicknamed Le petit Versailles ("the little Versailles").

== Garden restoration timeline ==
=== First restoration (1948) ===
After WWII, the park was damaged (including by bombs - during the Second World War, on Sunday, August 27, 1944, around 4 p.m., the estate was bombed, destroying the chapel and the orangery, which were immediately rebuilt) and was “entièrement restauré” in 1948 under the direction of the landscape/parks specialist Ferdinand Duprat.

=== Second restoration (1960–?) ===
During the 1960s, the estate was restored by its owner (Robert Gérard) and then sold by his heirs to Chinese-American Olivia Hsu Decker in 1998.

=== Third restoration (2013) ===
The landscape agency Jean-Baptiste Duchêne carried out a project for the park, with missions including:

- A preliminary study for restoring central parts of the domain: the Cour des Communs, Cour d’Honneur, the Parterre, and the Bosquets of the cascade.
- Preparation of a tender dossier (Dossier de Consultation des Entreprises).
- Assistance to follow up the work on site.

The program of intervention for that restoration included:

- Hydraulic work (cleaning out the two ponds / water bodies; restoration of hydraulic control structures)
- Restoring the landscape features:
- Reestablishing the Grand Perspective East-West
- Replanting the alignments at the Cour des Communs
- Restoring the Parterre (lawn pieces cut)
- Refilling the bosquets known as the cascade bosquets.

=== Fourth restoration (2014–2016) ===
Major restoration campaign from about 2014, under architect-decorator Jacques Garcia.

=== Fifth restoration (2022–2026) ===
Aivars Zvidris carried out a maintenance and restoration of the Villette park, including new plantings for the park:

- A old wood cleaning works (selective removal of dead or weakened trees, as well as invasive undergrowth)
- Preparation and creation of a new lawns in park
- Planting of new trees - creation of new Platanus hispanica alley
- Planting of new trees – creation of new Quercus petrea alley
- new conifers - magnolia zone with excellent collection of conifers and magnolias
- implementation of a conifers hedges and new leaf trees in cleaned wooden zones
- maintenance of all park, including central part with French garden
- planting of Laurus noblis in Versailles planters in front of central entrance (Cour d’Honneur)
- Restoration the old rosariums (near Kitchen garden & Orangerie) with new collection of Andre Eve roses
- Restoration of the Kitchen garden
- Restoration of the Grand Canal - with plantation of Platanus x acerifolia alley of 50 trees on both sides of Grand Canal

== Films and television series ==
This French château was chosen to be a part of the shooting locations for a number of films and TV series:

- Sky Fighters (original French title: Les Chevaliers du ciel, first released in 2005), featuring a private mansion owned by the French Air Forces general staff.
- The Da Vinci Code (2006), in which it is the home of Sir Leigh Teabing.
- In Paradisum (2012), a video by the German fashion and art photographer Iris Brosch.
- La Mante (2017), a television miniseries, featured the château to where the character Jeanne Deber is transferred.
- The Seduction (2025), a television series, feature the château.

== See also ==
- List of tourist attractions in Paris
