= Bernard Judge =

American architect (1931–2021)

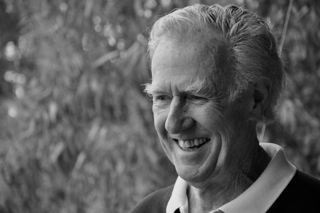
Judge in 2013

Bernard Judge (June 9, 1931 – November 15, 2021) was an American architect whose work in Southern California and French Polynesia was focused on environmental planning, modern architecture, and historic preservation. In 1968, Bernard Judge was awarded a United States patent for his innovative structural system based on a four-pole, pre-cut residential module. His own home in the Hollywood Hills is based on this construction. He referred to the dome as his "Triponent House."

== Early life ==
Judge was born in New York City, to Helene Chatelain Judge, a painter and anthropologist, and Joseph Michael Judge, an architect and Dean of Architecture at Penn State in the 1930s. He spent his early childhood at his family home in Fontainbleau, outside Paris; Managua, Nicaragua; and Mexico City. After completing high school in Forest Hills, New York, he served in the U.S. Naval Construction Battalions in French Morocco for four years, followed by architectural study at L'Ecole des Beaux Arts in Paris. He completed his architectural studies at the University of Southern California (where he was influenced by his professors Gregory Ain and Conrad Buff) in 1960.

== Career ==
Judge received initial recognition in 1960 when his first project, “The Triponent House”, which he built in the Hollywood Hills, was published in several international journals. His “Triponent House”, a geodesic dome completed in 1962, was Judge's effort to find an economically sound solution to housing using the finest technology of the day. He called his experimental house “Triponent” for its three intrinsic elements: the envelope, utility core, and interior spaces. The envelope consisted of a 50-foot diameter geodesic dome covered with transparent Mylar and shaded by photo-electric cells. The utility core contained the manufactured plumbing, utilities, kitchen and bathroom appliances, mechanical and electrical systems. Interior spaces were left open for the individuals using them to design for themselves accordingly. The geodesic framework of the “Triponent House” is at the Smithsonian Institution in Washington, D.C. "The Triponent House" can be seen in the final scene of the Italian movie Smog.

In 1965, Judge started his own architectural firm, The Environmental Systems Group, with the concentration of his work in residential and commercial design, preservation, and resort facility planning, with particular focus on the local environment and culture. He has conducted housing research in a dozen countries around the world, taught design and lectured on environmental design at California State University, Long Beach, California Polytechnic Institute, Pomona, University of California Los Angeles, University of Southern California, Southern California Institute of Architecture, and University of California Berkeley. Judge has been published in architectural books and design journals across the globe and has addressed the International Society for Coral Reef Studies.

=== Book ===
His environmental work with Marlon Brando producing the early 1970s master plan and architectural design for Tetiaroa, Tahiti was a defining experience both personally and professionally. Over the years, the reception Judge received from audiences responding to his talks about the project encouraged him to write the book published by ORO editions in 2011, Waltzing with Brando.

In Waltzing with Brando, Planning a Paradise in Tahiti, Judge recounts his experiences from 1970 to 1975 creating a sustainable village on an unpopulated group of islands and lagoon in the South Pacific for Marlon Brando, who had recently purchased Tetiʻaroa.

The book is an illustrated narrative about the dynamics of the architect and client collaboration on an environmentally and culturally rich atoll, investigating living in nature without despoiling the ecology, archeology, or interdependence of marine life.

In 2023, production began on a movie adaptation of the book entitled Waltzing with Brando, starring Jon Heder as Bernard Judge, and Billy Zane as Marlon Brando. The film was written and directed by Bill Fishman.

== Personal life ==
Judge died on November 15, 2021, at the age of 90.
