= Anamaria Vartolomei =

Romanian-French actress (born 1999)

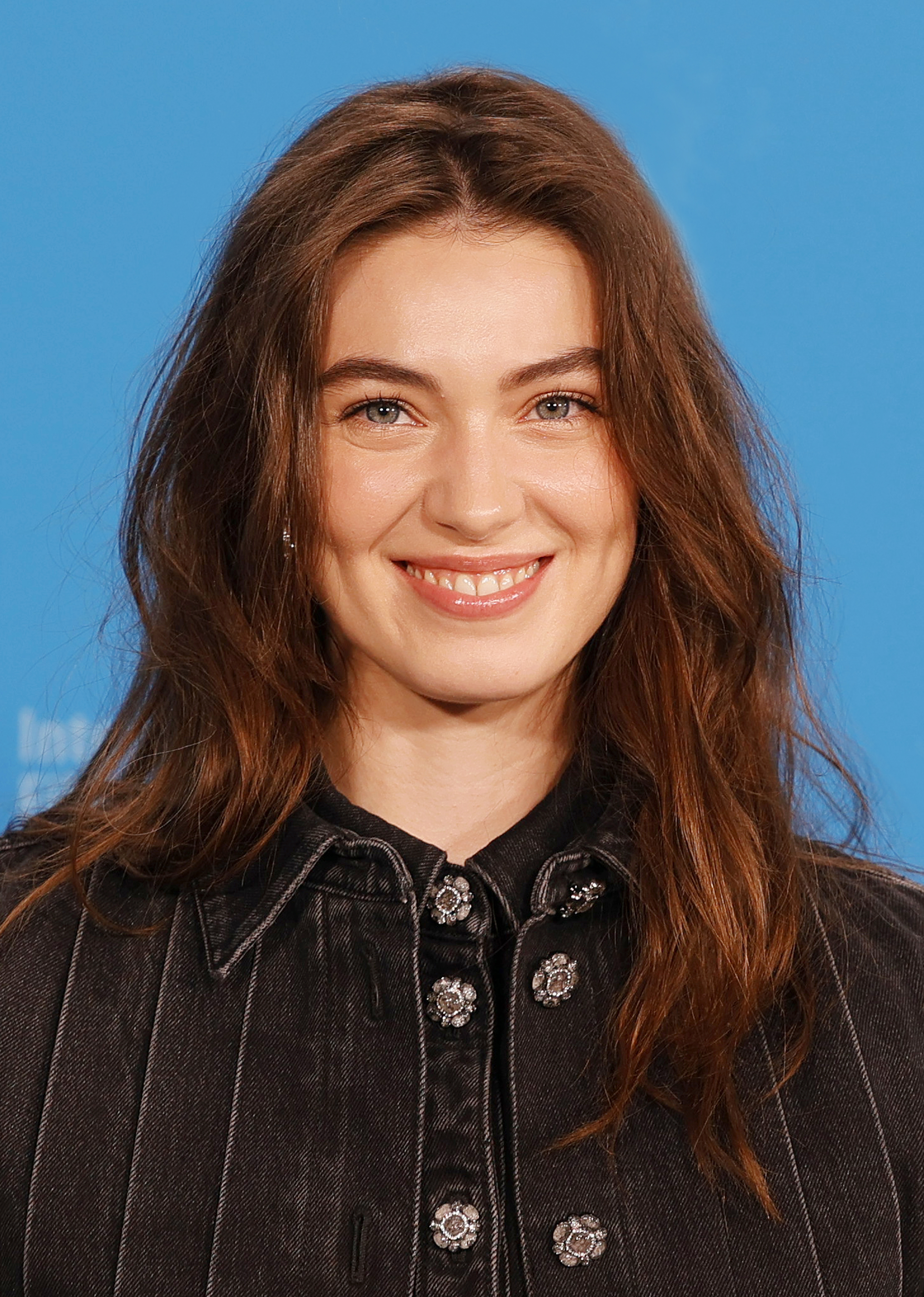
- Vartolomei at Berlinale 2024
- Born: 9 April 1999 (age 27); Bacău, Romania
- Occupation: Actress
- Years active: 2011–present

Anamaria Vartolomei (French: [anamaʁia vaʁtɔlɔmɛi]; Romanian: [aˌnama'ri.a 'vartolomej]; born 9 April 1999) is a French-Romanian actress. She began her career as a child actress in the film My Little Princess (2011). She won the Lumière Award for Best Actress and the César Award for Most Promising Actress for her performance in Happening (2021). She appeared on the UniFrance and Screen International lists of rising French talents to watch. She made her English-language debut in Bong Joon Ho's Mickey 17 (2025).

== Early life and education ==
Vartolomei was born in Bacău and lived in the Plopu village of Dărmănești. Her parents began working abroad when Vartolomei was only two, first in England and later in France. Having initially been cared for by her grandparents. she joined her parents at the age of six, settling in Issy-les-Moulineaux. She attended l'école Anatole France. She trained in acting at the Cours Florent and Les Enfants Terribles. She enrolled in a modern literature program at the Sorbonne, but left after one day to pursue her acting career.

== Filmography ==
Key
†	Denotes films that have not yet been released

Year	Title	Role	Notes
2011	My Little Princess	Violetta Giurgiu	Film debut
2014	Jacky in the Kingdom of Women	Zonia	
2014	C comme Couteau	Bianca	Short film
2015	The Second Shore	Alexandra	Short film
2016	My revolution	Sygrid	
2016	The Ideal	Lena	
2016	Eternity	Margaux (ages 17–19)	
2017	The Sower	Joséphine	
2017	The Royal Exchange	Louise Élisabeth d'Orléans	
2019	Poseur		Short film
2019	Sororal	Emilie	Short film
2019	Just Kids	Lisa Certy	
2020	How to Be a Good Wife	Albane Des-deux-Ponts	
2021	Happening	Anne Duchesne	
2022	Méduse	Clémence	
2024	The Empire	Jane de Baecque	
2024	Being Maria	Maria Schneider	
2024	The Count of Monte Cristo	Haydée	
2024	Traffic	Natalia	Romanian-language debut
2025	Mickey 17	Kai Katz	English-language debut
2025	Adam's Interest	Rebecca	
2025	The Seduction	Isabelle de Merteuil	TV series
2026	De Gaulle	Livia	
2026	The Green Eyes	Marion	
TBA	Miles & Juliette †	Juliette Gréco	

== Awards and nominations ==
Year	Award	Category	Work	Result	Ref.
2012	Lumière Awards	Most Promising Actress	My Little Princess	Nominated	
2022	Lumière Awards	Best Actress	Happening	Won	
2022	International Cinephile Society	Best Actress	Happening	Runner-up	
2022	International Cinephile Society	Best Breakthrough Performance	Happening	Won	
2022	Berlinale	Shooting Star	—N/a	Won	
2022	César Awards	Most Promising Actress	Happening	Won	
2022	Dublin International Film Festival	Best Actress	Happening	Won	
2024	37th Tokyo International Film Festival	Best Actress	Traffic	Won	
