= The Royal Exchange (film) =

2017 film

- Directed by: Marc Dugain
- Starring: Lambert Wilson; Anamaria Vartolomei
- Cinematography: Gilles Porte
- Release date: 27 December 2017
- Running time: 100 min
- Countries: France; Belgium
- Language: French
- Box office: $3.1 million

The Royal Exchange (French: L'échange des princesses) is a 2017 Belgian-French historical film based on the eponymous novel by Chantal Thomas.

== Plot ==
The Royal Exchange follows the political marriages arranged in 1721 between the French and Spanish royal families. The Regent Philippe d'Orléans of France proposes a marriage between Louis XV, the 11-year-old heir to the French throne, and Maria Anna Victoria, the 4-year-old Spanish Infanta. Additionally, he arranges for his 12-year-old daughter, Louise-Élisabeth, to marry the 14-year-old Prince of Asturias, heir to the Spanish throne.

Madrid enthusiastically accepts both proposals, and the exchange of princesses is planned with great pomp on a small island between the two countries. However, despite the careful arrangements, nothing goes as planned. The young royals struggle with their new roles, leading to unexpected complications that threaten the diplomatic alliance.

== Cast ==
- Lambert Wilson - Philippe V
- Anamaria Vartolomei - Louise-Élisabeth
- Olivier Gourmet - Philippe d'Orléans
- Catherine Mouchet - Madame de Ventadour
- Kacey Mottet Klein - Don Luis
- Patrick Descamps - Maréchal de Villeroy
- Andréa Ferréol - Princesse Palatine
- Maya Sansa - Elisabeth Farnese
