= The Seduction (TV series) =

French period drama television series

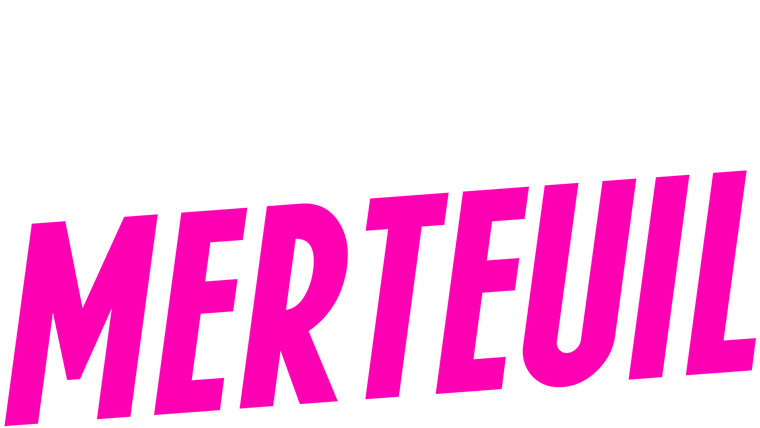
- French: Merteuil
- Genre: Period drama
- Created by: Jean-Baptiste Delafon
- Based on: Les Liaisons dangereuses by Pierre Choderlos de Laclos
- Directed by: Jessica Palud
- Starring: Anamaria Vartolomei; Diane Kruger; Vincent Lacoste; Lucas Bravo
- Opening theme: "Iron" by Woodkid
- Composer: Delphine Malausséna
- Country of origin: France
- Original language: French
- No. of seasons: 1
- No. of episodes: 6

Production
- Producers: Marie Guillaumond; Clément Birnbaum; Joachim Nahum
- Production locations: Val-d'Oise (Île-de-France); Normandy
- Camera setup: Single-camera
- Running time: 41-47 minutes
- Production companies: Nabi Productions; Felicita Films

Original release
- Network: HBO Max (Note: Despite being marketed as an "HBO Original," the series was released directly on HBO Max as HBO is only available as a content hub within the service in France.)
- Release: 14 November 2025 – present

The Seduction (known as Merteuil in France) is a French television series created by Jean-Baptiste Delafon, based on Pierre Choderlos de Laclos's epistolary novel Les Liaisons dangereuses. It stars Anamaria Vartolomei, Diane Kruger, Vincent Lacoste, and Lucas Bravo. The series is both a prequel and a loose adaptation of the plot of the novel, and follows Isabelle de Merteuil (Vartolomei) as she is trying to get revenge on Vicomte de Valmont (Lacoste) after he betrayed her.

The series production was announced by HBO Max in September 2024 with Nabi Productions and Felicita Films serving as producers. Filming took place mainly in Val-d'Oise between September and December 2024. Originally announced as a Max Original, it was rebranded as an HBO Original in October 2025.

The Seduction premiered in France and internationally on 14 November 2025 on HBO Max's HBO hub. Metacritic, which uses a weighted average, assigned a score of 69 out of 100 based on 9 critics, indicating "generally favorable" reviews.

== Premise ==
The day after her marriage, Isabelle Dassonville discovers that the ceremony was fake and that her husband was in reality the Vicomte de Valmont, who was manipulating her. Condemned to take a vow of silence in a convent, her only way to escape is to follow Valmont's aunt, Madame de Rosemonde, who wants to use her to seduce the Comte de Gercourt in Paris for her own mysterious motives. But when Rosemonde's plan fails, Isabelle decides to marry the Comte de Merteuil in order to become a Marquise and gain power to help her to get revenge on Valmont.

== Cast ==
=== Main ===
- Anamaria Vartolomei as Isabelle de Merteuil (née Dassonville)
- Diane Kruger as Madame de Rosemonde
- Vincent Lacoste as the Vicomte de Valmont
- Lucas Bravo as the Comte de Gercourt

=== Recurring ===
- Noée Abita as Madame de Tourvel
- Julien de Saint Jean as Louis de Germain
- Fantine Harduin as Cécile de Volanges
- Samuel Kircher as the Chevalier Danceny
- Sandrine Blancke as Madame de Volanges

== Episodes ==
No.	Title	Directed by	Written by	Original release date
1	"Isabelle"	Jessica Palud	Jean-Baptiste Delafon; In collaboration with: Gaëlle Bellan & Jessica Palud	14 November 2025
2	"L'enfer du Grand Monde" "The Hell of High Society"	Jessica Palud	Jean-Baptiste Delafon; In collaboration with: Jessica Palud	21 November 2025
3	"La Guerre" "War"	Jessica Palud	Jean-Baptiste Delafon	28 November 2025
4	"Les liaisons dangereuses" "Dangerous Liaisons"	Jessica Palud	Jean-Baptiste Delafon	5 December 2025
5	"La Sainte et la Putain" "The Saint and the Whore"	Jessica Palud	Jean-Baptiste Delafon	12 December 2025
6	"Versailles"	Jessica Palud	Jean-Baptiste Delafon; In collaboration with: Jessica Palud	19 December 2025

== Production ==
=== Development ===
In September 2024, HBO Max announced that a loose adaptation of Pierre Choderlos de Laclos's Les Liaisons dangereuses that will focus on the origins of Isabelle de Merteuil entered production with Jessica Palud directing, while Clément Birnbaum and Joachim Nahum from UGC's Nabi Productions and Marie Guillaumond from Studio TF1's Felicita Films will serve as producers.

The series was originally announced as an HBO Max original series, however, when the trailer was released in October 2025, it was rebranded as an HBO Original, similarly to The Penguin, Dune: Prophecy, and It: Welcome to Derry.

=== Filming ===
Filming began on 4 September and wrapped on 13 December 2024, and took place in Île-de-France, mainly in Val-d'Oise, while some scenes where filmed in Normandy. Many châteaux were used by the production, including the Château de Villette.

== Release ==
The Seduction premiered on HBO Max's HBO hub in France and internationally on 14 November 2025, with subsequent episodes released weekly.

Contrary to other Max Original series that premiered first on HBO when they were rebranded as HBO Original, the series release was not affected by the rebranding as the channel is only available as a content hub within the service in France. It was also released directly on the service in territories where the channel is available, while still being branded as an HBO Original.
