= Wanted: Babysitter =

- French film poster
- French: La Baby-Sitter
- Directed by: René Clément
- Written by: Nicola Badalucco; René Clément; Mark Peploe; Luciano Vincenzoni
- Story by: Nicola Badalucco; Luciano Vincenzoni
- Produced by: Jacques Bar; Carlo Ponti; Zev Braun; Wolfdieter von Stein
- Starring: Maria Schneider; Sydne Rome; Vic Morrow; Robert Vaughn; Nadja Tiller
- Cinematography: Alberto Spagnoli
- Edited by: Christiane Lack; Fedora Zincone
- Music by: Francis Lai
- Production company: Cité Films; Compagnia Cinematografica Champion; TIT Filmproduktion
- Distributed by: Société Nouvelle de Cinématographie (France); Titanus (Italy); Cinerama Filmgesellschaft (West Germany)
- Release dates: October 15, 1975 (France); November 8, 1975 (Italy); November 27, 1975 (West Germany)
- Country: France; Italy; West Germany
- Language: English

Wanted: Babysitter (French: La Baby-Sitter, lit. 'The Babysitter', also known as Scar Tissue and The Raw Edge) is a 1975 thriller film directed by René Clément, from a screenplay co-written with Mark Peploe, Nicola Badalucco, and Luciano Vincenzoni. It stars Maria Schneider, Sydne Rome, Vic Morrow, Robert Vaughn, and Nadja Tiller. It was Clément's last film before his death in 1996.

== Plot ==
Michelle, a naive young girl, is kidnapped while babysitting the son of a wealthy businessman. She and the boy are held hostage by an ex-stuntman and a vengeful movie star.

== Cast ==
- Maria Schneider as Michelle
- Sydne Rome as Ann
- Vic Morrow as Vic
- Robert Vaughn as Stuart Chase
- John Whittington as 'Boots' Peter Franklin
- Nadja Tiller as Lotte
- Renato Pozzetto as Gianni
- Carl Möhner as Cyrus Franklin
- Clelia Matania as Old Neighbour
- Marco Tulli as Inspector Trieste
- Armando Brancia as Inspector Carrara
- Georg Marischka as Mr. Henderson
- Maria Cumani Quasimodo as Princess Ruspini (uncredited)

== Release ==
Wanted: Babysitter was released in French theatres on October 15, 1975.

=== Home media ===
The film was released on DVD on June 1, 2004, initially, and later on January 1, 2005, and May 13, 2009. Wanted: Babysitter was digitally remastered on January 2, 2015.
