= Back Home (2019 film) =

2019 French film

- Directed by: Jessica Palud
- Screenplay by: Diastème; Philippe Lioret; Jessica Palud
- Starring: Niels Schneider; Adèle Exarchopoulos
- Cinematography: Victor Seguin
- Edited by: Thomas Marchand
- Music by: Mathilda Cabezas; Augustin Charnet
- Release date: 2019
- Country: France
- Language: French

Back Home (French: Revenir) is a 2019 French drama film co-written and directed by Jessica Palud, in her feature film debut. It is based on the novel L'amour sans le faire by Serge Joncour.

The film was entered into the Horizons competition at the 61st edition of the Venice Film Festival, winning the prize for best screenplay.

== Plot ==
Thomas returns to his childhood home to find out that his mother is dying and forms a bond with his brother's widow.

== Cast ==
- Niels Schneider as Thomas Moreno
- Adèle Exarchopoulos as Mona
- Roman Coustère Hachez as Alex
- Patrick d'Assumçao as Michel Moreno
- Hélène Vincent as Catherine Moreno
- Franck Falise as Marco
- Jonathan Couzinié as Eric
- Catherine Salée as the nurse
