= Jessica Palud =

French filmmaker (born 1982)

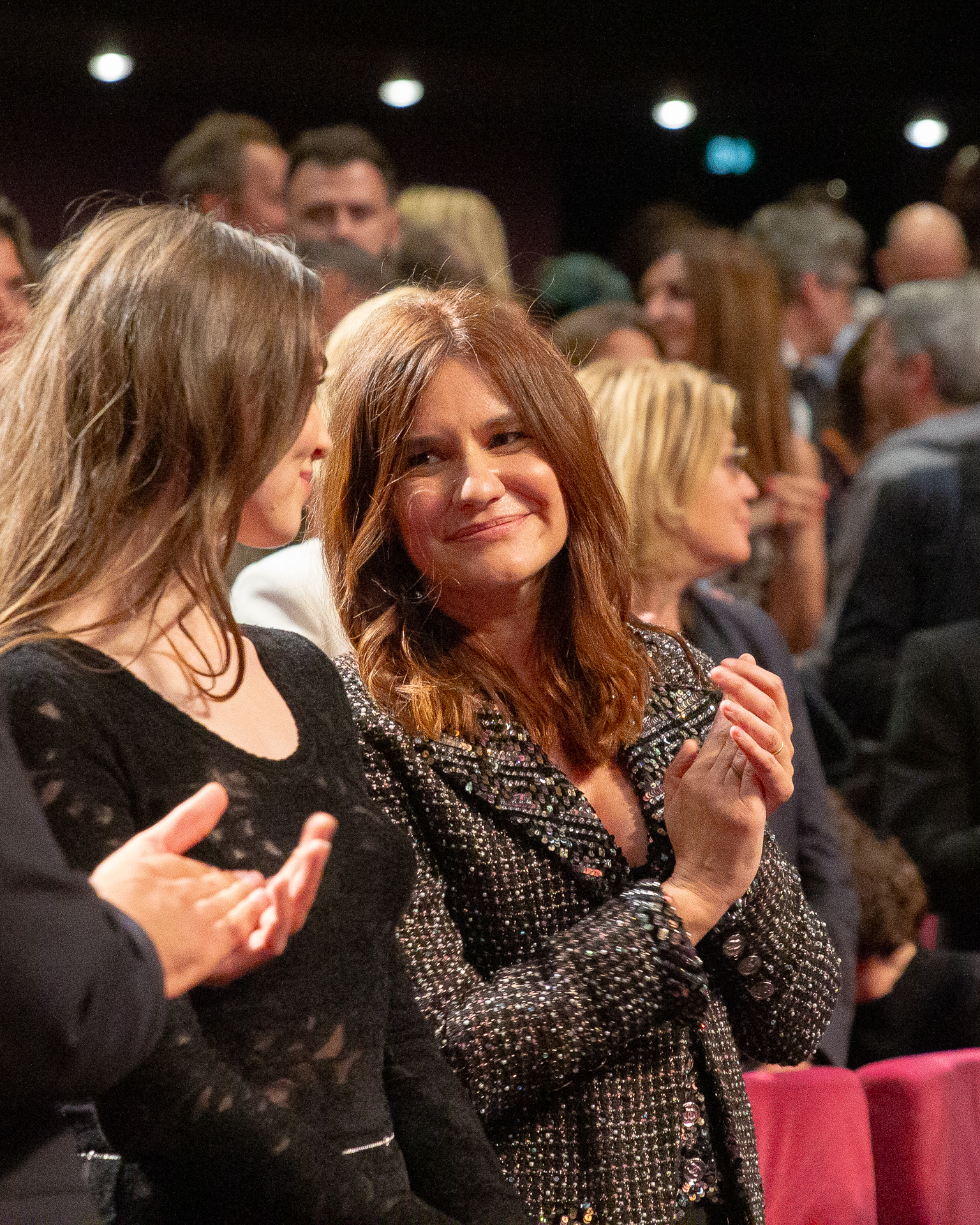
- Jessica Palud at World Premiere of Being Maria during Cannes 2024 Film Festival
- Born: 1982 (age 42–43); Paris, France

Jessica Palud is a French filmmaker.

== Early life ==
Palud was born in Paris.

== Career ==
Prior to directing her own films, Palud worked as an assistant director, most notably alongside Philippe Lioret.

Palud's short film Marlon was nominated for the 2018 César Award for Best Short Film. Her first feature-length film, Back Home, debuted at the 76th Venice International Film Festival in 2019.

Being Maria, Palud's biographical film about Maria Schneider, premiered at the 2024 Cannes Film Festival.

== Filmography ==
Year	Title	Notes	Ref.
2017	Marlon	Short film	
2019	Back Home	—	
2024	Being Maria	—	
2025	The Seduction	TV series	

== Awards and nominations ==
Year	Award	Category	Nominated work	Result	Ref.
2018	César Awards	Best Short Film	Marlon	Nominated	
2019	Venice Film Festival	Horizons Award for Best Film	Back Home	Nominated	
2019	Venice Film Festival	Horizons Award for Best Screenplay	Back Home	Won	
