= Traffic (2024 film) =

2024 Romanian heist drama film

- Theatrical release poster
- Romanian: Jaful Secolului
- Literally: The Robbery of the Century
- Directed by: Teodora Ana Mihai
- Screenplay by: Cristian Mungiu
- Produced by: Tudor Reu; Annemie Degryse; Jeroen Beker
- Starring: Anamaria Vartolomei; Ionuț Niculae
- Cinematography: Marius Panduru
- Edited by: Katharina Wartena; Robert Bitay
- Production companies: Mindset Productions; Lunanime; Bastide Films
- Distributed by: SBS International; Forum Film
- Release dates: 16 October 2024 (Warsaw); 23 September 2025 (Romania)
- Running time: 119 minutes
- Countries: Romania; Belgium; Netherlands
- Languages: Romanian; English; Dutch

Traffic (Romanian: Jaful Secolului) is a 2024 heist drama film directed by Teodora Mihai, written by Cristian Mungiu. Starring Anamaria Vartolomei and Ionuț Niculae, it follows a group of Romanian immigrants in Belgium, who go from unwanted second-class citizens to wanted criminals, as they decide to stage a heist that will change their lives forever. The story of the film is inspired by a theft of paintings signed by Picasso, Monet, and Gauguin from a Dutch museum in 2012 by three Romanians.

The film had its world premiere in the International Competition section of the Warsaw Film Festival on 16 October 2024, where it won the Warsaw Grand Prix. It was theatrically released on Romania on 23 September 2025. It was selected as the Romanian entry for the Best International Feature Film at the 98th Academy Awards, but it was not nominated.

== Cast ==
- Anamaria Vartolomei as Natalia
- Ionuț Niculae as Ginel
- Rareș Andrici as Iță
- Robert Iovan as Adrian
- Thomas Ryckewaert as Mr. Michels
- Mike Libanon
- Macrina Bârlădeanu
- Lucian Ifrim as a prosecutor
- Alexandru Potocean as a prosecutor
- Mirela Nicolau
- Ana Ciontea

== Release ==
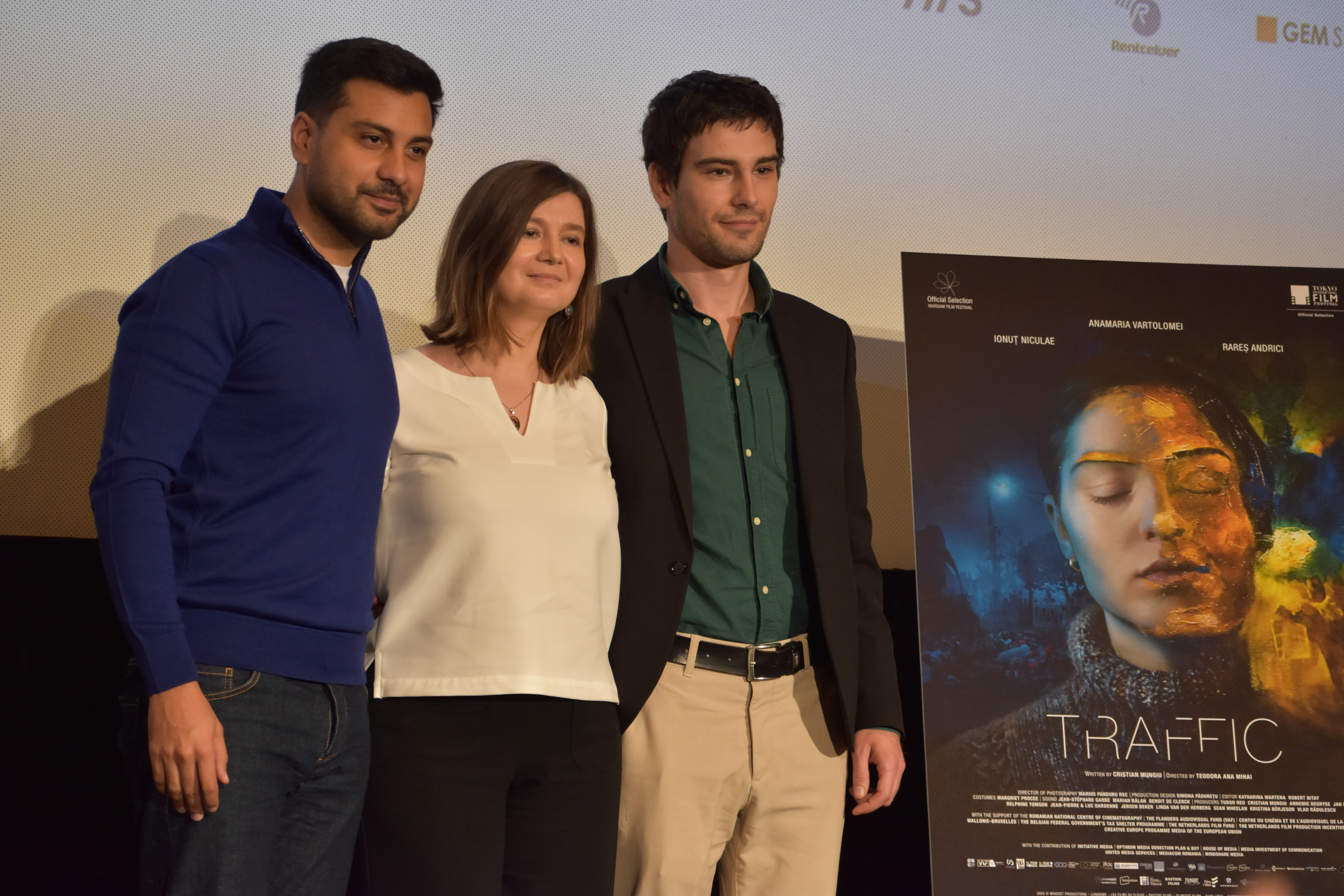
Ionuț Niculae, Teodora Ana Mihai, and Rareș Andrici at the Tokyo International Film Festival, 2024

Traffic premiered in the Official Competition of the Warsaw Film Festival on 16 October 2024, where it won the Best Film award. It was presented in International Competition at the 37th Tokyo International Film Festival on 31 October 2024, where it was awarded the Best Actress award for Anamaria Vartolomei.

It was screened in the RTM section of the 54th International Film Festival Rotterdam on 31 January 2025.

It was presented in Romanian Film Days at the Transilvania International Film Festival on 20 June 2025.

It was screened at the Shanghai International Film Festival in June 2025, where it received the Audience Recommendation Award.

The film competed in the Awards Buzz – Best International Feature Film section of the 37th Palm Springs International Film Festival on 4 January 2026.

The film was released on 23 September 2025 in Romania by Forum Film.

== Reception ==
In her review for Cineuropa, Manuela Lazić highlights the film’s exploration of the harsh realities of exploitative immigrant labour, balanced by its use of humour. She describes it as "a layered social-realist film examining inequality and exploitation in our modern world, with a healthy dose of humour."

== Accolades ==
Award	Date of ceremony	Category	Recipient	Result	Ref.
Warsaw Film Festival	19 October 2024	Warsaw Grand Prix	Traffic	Won	
Tokyo International Film Festival	6 November 2024	Best Actress	Anamaria Vartolomei	Won	
Sofia International Film Festival	31 March 2025	Best Balkan Film	Traffic	Won	

== See also ==
- List of submissions to the 98th Academy Awards for Best International Feature Film
- List of Romanian submissions for the Academy Award for Best International Feature Film
