= Michel Schneider =

French writer (1944–2022)

- Born: 28 May 1944; Dammarie-lès-Lys, France
- Died: 21 July 2022 (aged 78); Villejuif, France
- Education: École nationale d'administration
- Occupations: Writer, psychoanalyst
- Children: Vanessa Schneider; François Schneider

Michel Schneider (28 May 1944 – 21 July 2022) was a French writer, musicologist, énarque, senior official, and psychoanalyst. He was the father of journalist and writer Vanessa Schneider and of François Schneider, a history teacher. He was also the maternal uncle of actress Maria Schneider.

== Career ==
A former student of the École nationale d'administration, he began his career at the Department of Forecasting of the French Ministry of Economy and Finance in 1971. He was appointed adviser to the Court of Audit in 1981. He was at the head of the Direction de la Musique, de la Danse, du Théâtre et des Spectacles in the Ministry of Culture from 1988 to 1991. Michel Schneider died in Villejuif on 21 July 2022 at the age of 78.

== Académie française ==
He obtained ten votes in the election at the Académie Française on 7 February 2008 where he applied to the succession of Bertrand Poirot-Delpech.

== Opinions ==
=== Same-sex couples marriage ===
After the civil solidarity pact, marriage is only a step towards gay parenting. I am opposed to it. The State, which gives symbolism its force of constraint and benchmark for society – and not vice versa – should not allow marriage and filiation between two persons of the same sex. If human sexuality is not simply "natural", it is not entirely cultural, free from the laws of reproduction.

=== Lesbians and assisted reproductive technology ===
There is, in the position of having children without having to relate to the male sex, a fear, a hatred, a fear, a phobia of the virile member, which makes one try to have the product of mating without having to go through the act of mating. There is a fantasy, one wants to say "Ladies, if you want to have children, there is a very simple, very economic way, which costs nothing to anyone, it is the sexual intercourse with a man in flesh and blood". Why do you need ART? Why do you want to be a mother when you have chosen a mode of sexuality that forbids it?

In the magazine LGBT Yagg, these words have been described as "homophobic, transphobic and misogynistic" as well as "psychoanalytic-reactionary considerations" by Maëlle Le Corre.

== Bibliography ==
=== Psychoanalysis ===
- 1980: Blessures de mémoire, Paris, Éditions Gallimard, coll. "Connaissance de l'inconscient".
- 1985: Voleurs de mots : essai sur le plagiat, la psychanalyse et la pensée, Paris, Gallimard, series "Connaissance de l'inconscient", ISBN 2-07-070 501-3.
- 2010: Lacan, les années fauve, Paris, PUF, series "Fil Rouge" (ISBN 978-2-13-058554-1).

=== Narratives ===
- 1990: Bleu passé, Gallimard

=== Novels ===
- 1991: Je crains de lui parler la nuit, Gallimard
- 2011: Comme une ombre, Grasset

=== On music ===
- 2001: Prima donna, Éditions Odile Jacob
- 2011: Musiques de nuit (in French). Paris: Odile Jacob. 2001. pp. 352. ISBN 273810942X. OCLC 48098706.

=== Biographical essays ===
- 1988: Glenn Gould, piano solo : aria et trente variations, Gallimard, series "L'un et l'autre" ISBN 2-07-038 841-7.
- 1989: La Tombée du jour : Schuman, Le Seuil, series "La librairie du XX" ISBN 2-02-010 882-8.
- 1991: Un rêve de pierre : le Radeau de la méduse : Géricault, Gallimard
- 1999: Maman, Paris, Gallimard, series "L'un et l'autre" ISBN 2-07-031 946-6
- 2003: Morts imaginaires, Gallimard ISBN 2-07-031 462-6. Prix Médicis essai 2003
- 2005: Schumann : Les voix intérieures, Paris, Gallimard, coll. "Découvertes Gallimard" (nº 481), ISBN 2070308677.
- 2006: Marilyn, dernières séances, Grasset, ISBN 2246703719. Prix Interallié 2006.
- 2014: L'Auteur, l'autre : Proust et son double, Gallimard

=== Political and sociological reflections ===
- 1993: La Comédie de la culture, Le Seuil,
- 2003: Big Mother, Odile Jacob, ISBN 2-73-811 085-1
- 2007: La Confusion des sexes, Groupe Flammarion, series "Café Voltaire" ISBN 978-2-08-069019-7
- 2013: Miroir des princes, Flammarion, series "Café Voltaire" ISBN 978-2-08-129951-1

=== Prizes ===
- 2007: 2nd Globes de Cristal Award: best novel Marylin, dernière séance
