= Vanessa Schneider =

French political journalist and writer (born 1969)

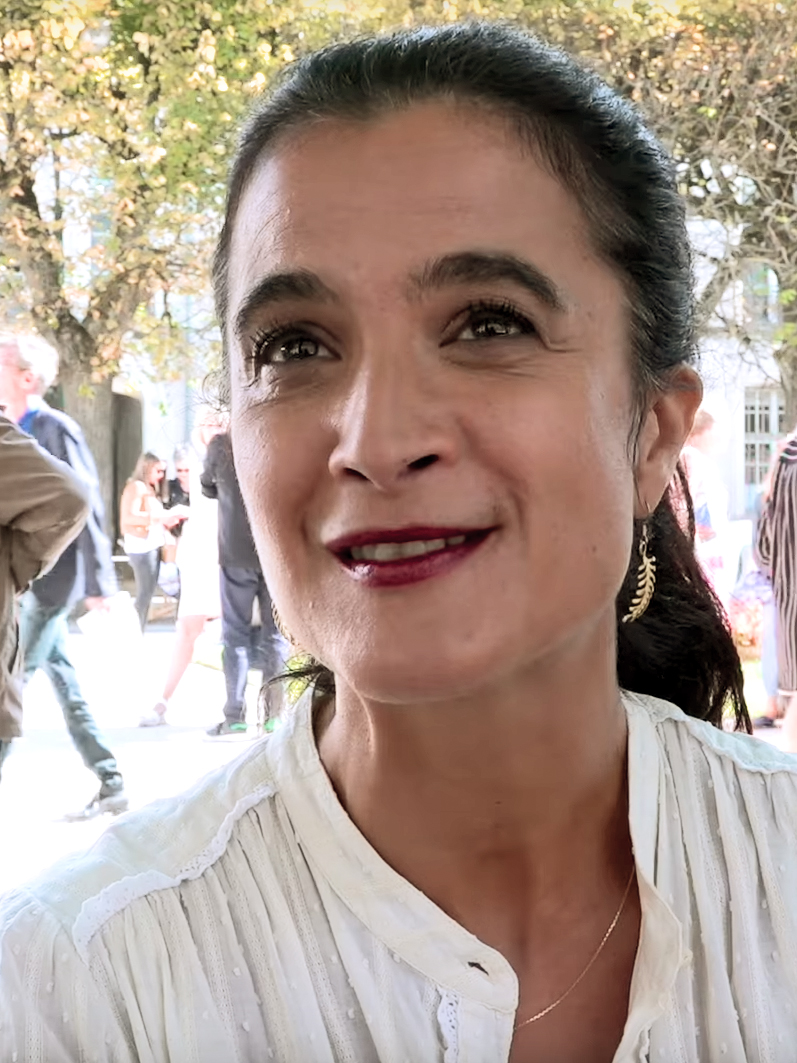
- Born: 1969 (age 56–57); Puteaux, France
- Education: Sciences Po; Centre de formation des journalistes
- Occupation: Journalist
- Family: Michel Schneider (father); Maria Schneider (cousin)

Vanessa Schneider (born 1969) is a French political journalist and writer.

== Life ==
Born in Puteaux, Hauts-de-Seine, Vanessa Schneider is the daughter of psychoanalyst Michel Schneider and the cousin of actress Maria Schneider.

She was a political journalist at Libération in 1994, she became a reporter for the CAPA agency in February 2007. At the same time, Schneider worked for the program Dimanche on Canal+ and, also on that channel, appeared as a commentator in the program Un café, l'addition (One coffee and the bill) with Pascale Clark from September 2007 to June 2008. She was also a regular columnist on RTL on the show On refait le monde (Remaking the World), then hosted by Nicolas Poincaré.

From 2009 to 2011, Schneider was a reporter for Marianne. In 2011, she joined the political department of the daily newspaper Le Monde, covering government affairs. She covered Nicolas Sarkozy's campaign in the presidential election of 2012. She is now a journalist at M magazine.

Between September 2014 and July 2015, Schneider had a weekly opinion column every Wednesday in the program On n'est pas forcément d'accord (We do not necessarily agree) hosted by Éric Zemmour and Nicolas Domenach.

She regularly takes part in the program C dans l'air on France 5, and As we talk on France Inter.

In May 2008, she published La Mère de ma mère, her first autobiographical novel, in which she portrays her maternal grandmother and her denial of her African origins. In October 2009, she released her second novel, Do Not Go Crazy, in which she continues to explore her family origins. At the start of the 2011 literary season, she published The Pact of Virgins, a story inspired by an American news story: 17 young girls became pregnant at the same time.

In 2018, she published Tu t'appelais Maria Schneider, a book about her cousin Maria Schneider. In 2024, the book was adapted into the film Being Maria, directed by Jessica Palud.

== Works ==
- La Mère de ma mère, éditions Stock, «Bleue» coll., 2008, (ISBN 9782234061132)
- Tâche de ne pas devenir folle, éditions Stock, «Bleue» coll., 2009, (ISBN 9782234061965)
- Le Pacte des vierges, éditions Stock, coll. « Bleue », 2011, (ISBN 9782234061965)
- Le jour où tu m’as quittée, éditions Stock, «Bleue» coll., 2014, (ISBN 9782234078079)
