= Maria Schneider (actress) =

French actress (1952–2011)

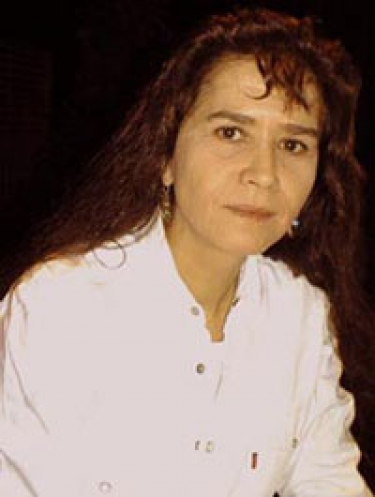
- Schneider at the Festival Créteil Films de Femmes in 2001
- Born: Maria-Hélène Schneider; 27 March 1952; Paris, France
- Died: 3 February 2011 (aged 58); Paris, France
- Occupation: Actress
- Years active: 1969–2008
- Partner: Maria Pia Almadio (19??–2011, Schneider's death)
- Father: Daniel Gélin
- Relatives: Xavier Gélin (half-brother); Fiona Gélin (half-sister); Michel Schneider (uncle); Vanessa Schneider (cousin)

Maria-Hélène Schneider (27 March 1952 – 3 February 2011), known professionally as Maria Schneider, was a French actress.

She first appeared on stage in Paris at the age of 15 and then moved on to work in films, initially as an extra, but had already advanced to more substantial roles by the age of 20.

Schneider achieved international recognition at the age of 19 for her performance opposite Marlon Brando in Bernardo Bertolucci's controversial Last Tango in Paris (1972). The film became controversial for its explicit sexual content and its infamous sexual assault scene.

In 1975 she starred opposite Jack Nicholson in Michelangelo Antonioni's critically acclaimed The Passenger. Although the film showcased her abilities, a reputation for walking out of films during production resulted in her becoming unwelcome in the industry. However, she re-established stability in her personal and professional life in the early 1980s, and became an advocate for equality and improving the working conditions for actresses.

She continued acting in film and TV until a few years before she died in 2011 after a long illness.

== Early life and family ==
Schneider was born in Paris to Daniel Gélin, a French actor, and Marie-Christine Schneider from Romania, a model who ran a bookshop in Paris. Gélin was married to actress and producer Danièle Delorme during the affair and his lack of fatherly involvement was deeply felt by his daughter. Gélin never formally recognized Schneider as his daughter, though he publicly acknowledged his paternity in the 1970s. Schneider was first brought up by her mother in a town near the French border with Germany. Eventually, her mother was unwilling to attend to her and entrusted her to a nurse for two years. Maria Schneider later lived for several years with her maternal uncle Michel Schneider and his wife. She reconnected with her biological father when she was sixteen, by visiting him unannounced.

Schneider later said that she had met Gélin only "three times". Her cousin Vanessa Schneider wrote, in a biographical book published in 2018, that Maria Schneider had actually been in regular contact with her father during her late teens. It was he who first brought her to a film set. Over the years, Maria Schneider and her biological father met irregularly. She eventually bonded with her half-siblings (who had been unaware of her until after she starred in Last Tango in Paris), especially her half-sister Fiona Gélin. Her half-brothers Xavier Gélin and Manuel Gélin were also actors.

== Acting career ==
=== Early years ===
As a teenager, Schneider loved films, going to the cinema up to four times a week. She left home at age 15 after an argument with her mother and went to Paris, where she made her stage-acting debut that same year. She eked out a living as a film extra and a model. While working on a film set, she met Brigitte Bardot, who having worked with her father on several productions, was "horrified" that the young actress was homeless and offered her a room in her house. Through Bardot, Schneider met people in the film business, including Warren Beatty, who was greatly impressed by Schneider, and introduced her to the William Morris Agency. She was 18 when she had her first break in 1970, appearing in Madly, starring Alain Delon. This was followed by relatively substantial roles in films such as Roger Vadim's Hellé (1972); The Old Maid (La Vieille Fille) (1972) with Philippe Noiret; Dear Parents (Cari genitori) (1973) opposite Florinda Bolkan and Catherine Spaak; and Dance of Love (1973), based on a play by Arthur Schnitzler. (The latter film is also known as Merry-Go-Round, which is distinct from Schneider's 1981 film of the same name directed by Jacques Rivette.)

=== Last Tango in Paris and related controversies ===
Schneider gained international renown for her performance at the age of 19 in the sexually explicit Last Tango in Paris (1972), directed by Bernardo Bertolucci. In a graphic portrayal of anonymous sex with an older man, she performed several nude scenes. However, it has been acknowledged that the film's explicit "butter" rape scene, which both Bertolucci and her co-star Marlon Brando knew about, was not revealed to her until Bertolucci informed just before the filming of it. In 2007, she said:

I should have called my agent or had my lawyer come to the set because you can't force someone to do something that isn't in the script, but at the time, I didn't know that. Marlon said to me: 'Maria, don't worry, it's just a movie,' but during the scene, even though what Marlon was doing wasn't real, I was crying real tears. I felt humiliated and to be honest, I felt a little raped, both by Marlon and by Bertolucci. After the scene, Marlon didn't console me or apologise. Thankfully, there was just one take.

In 2013, Bertolucci said he had withheld the information from her to generate a real "reaction of frustration and rage". Brando alleged that Bertolucci had wanted the characters to have real sex, but Brando and Schneider both said it was simulated. Actress Jessica Tovey, writing in The Guardian, argued that Bertolucci's defense of pursuing an artistic vision was "bogus" and that what occurred was "a violation." Tovey also observed that it is difficult to imagine the "roles being reversed; Brando being brutalized only to discover midway through filming that Schneider and Bertolucci had conspired to add an element of humiliation."

In 2001, Schneider commented:

Last Tango ... first major role. In fact, it's a total coincidence. I was friends with Dominique Sanda. She would make the film with Jean-Louis Trintignant, but she was pregnant. She had a large picture with her of both of us. Bertolucci saw it. He made me do a casting ... I regretted my choice since the beginning of my career would have been sweeter, quieter. For Tango, I was not prepared. People have identified with a character that was not me. Butter, about saucy old pigs ... Even Marlon with his charisma and class, felt a bit violated, exploited a little in this film. He rejected it for years. And me, I felt it doubly.

In the 1970s, criminal proceedings were brought against Bertolucci in Italy for obscenity; the film was sequestered by the censorship commission and all copies were ordered destroyed. An Italian court revoked Bertolucci's civil rights for five years and gave him a four-month suspended prison sentence. In 1978 the Appeals Court of Bologna ordered three copies of the film to be preserved in the national film library with the stipulation that they could not be viewed, until Bertolucci was later able to re-submit it for general distribution with no cuts.

Schneider said that due to her experience with the film – and her treatment afterward as a sex symbol rather than as a serious actress – she decided never to work nude again. She started struggling with depression, became a drug addict and made several suicide attempts. She remained friends with Brando as the years went on but still condemned Bertolucci; she said Bertolucci was “very manipulative, both of Marlon and myself, and would do certain things to get a reaction from me. Some mornings on set he would be very nice and say hello and on other days, he wouldn’t say anything at all.” “I was too young to know better,” she added. “Marlon later said that he felt manipulated, and he was Marlon Brando, so you can imagine how I felt.”

She later became a women's rights advocate, in particular fighting for more female film directors, more respect for actresses and better representation of women in film and other media.

I'm still struggling for the image of women in film and I'm still working, not as much as I would like to because for a woman in her late forties, it's hard to find work. Not only in France. I had a chat with Anjelica Huston last year. We spoke about the same problem, you know. I don't know where it comes from. The writers, the producers, or the directors. But I think it's a pity even for the public. We get a response to see a mature woman in film. We see many, many macho men in film. An actress like Meryl Streep doesn't work as much as Bob De Niro.

=== 1970s, post-Last Tango ===
In 1975, Schneider was cast opposite Jack Nicholson in the well-received Michelangelo Antonioni film The Passenger, which remains one of the highlights of her career, and was the personal favorite of the actress. That same year, Schneider also starred in René Clément's final movie, the Hitchcockian thriller Wanted: Babysitter, in which, according to Schneider, the director actually wanted the actress for the villainous role; yet, when Antonioni screened The Passenger for him, Clément decided that Schneider would be ideal for the heroine. The picture, produced by Carlo Ponti (as with The Passenger and Dear Parents) and also featuring Robert Vaughn, Vic Morrow, and Sydne Rome, went largely unnoticed by the public and critics alike.

During the 1970s, Schneider traveled (including to the Hopi Reservation and Navajo Nation) and lived in various parts of Europe, including Venice, Paris, and London. After The Passenger and Wanted: Babysitter, Schneider settled in Los Angeles for a year, looking around for film opportunities and being offered roles in Hollywood movies such as Black Sunday (1977) as a Palestinian guerilla terrorist, which she turned down based on what she perceived to be poor quality material. She signed up with renowned talent agent and producer Paul Kohner, and several movies were considered, but ultimately little came of this. Work became difficult for her to find, as she had become uninsurable.

Moving back to Europe, Schneider was asked by director Tinto Brass to play Drusilla, the incestuous sister of a notorious Roman emperor, opposite A Clockwork Orange star Malcolm McDowell, in the infamous, pornographic, multi-million dollar Penthouse production of Caligula; Schneider refused to perform nude or do graphic sex scenes, and was replaced mid-production with Teresa Ann Savoy, who had appeared in the director's previous film Salon Kitty.

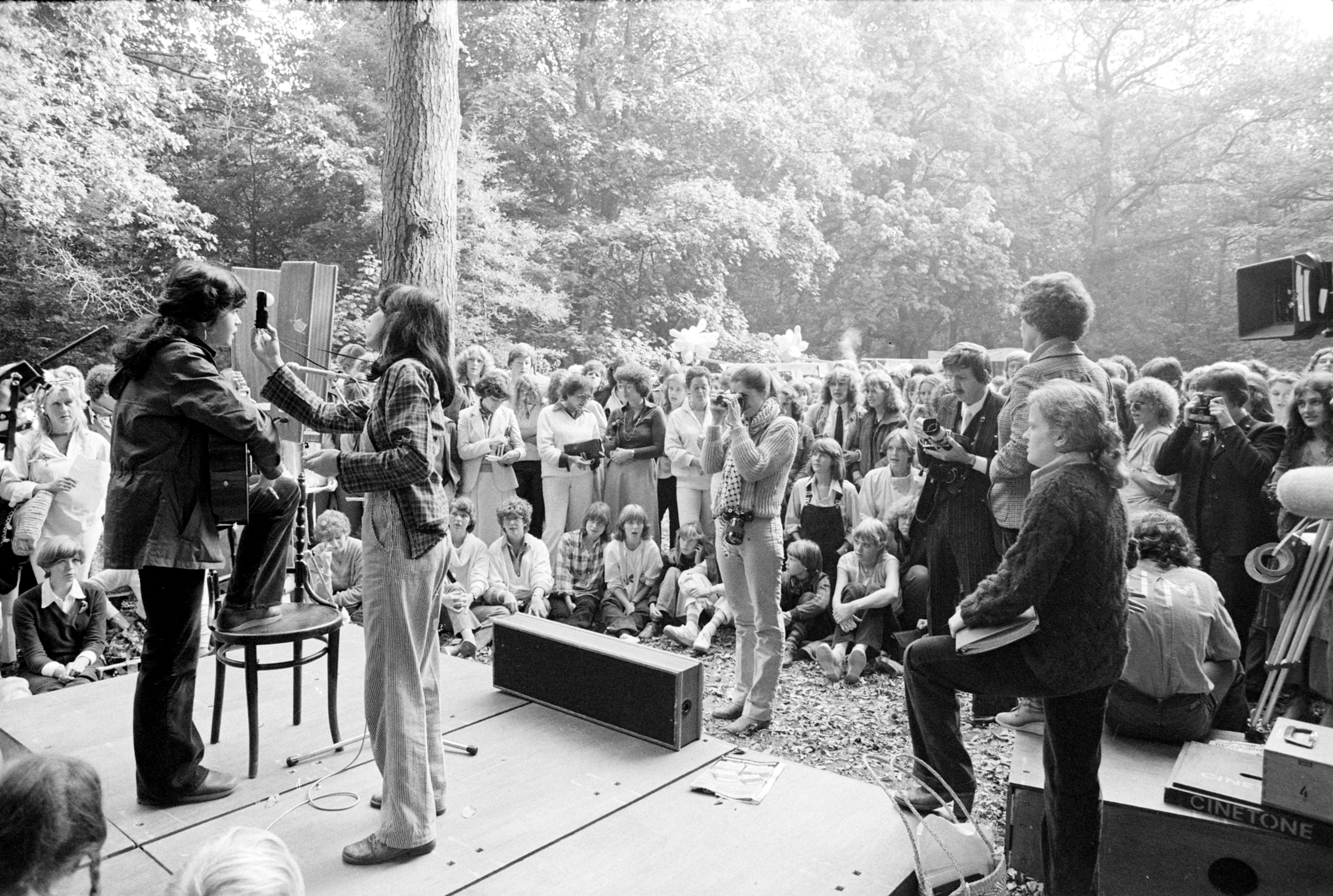

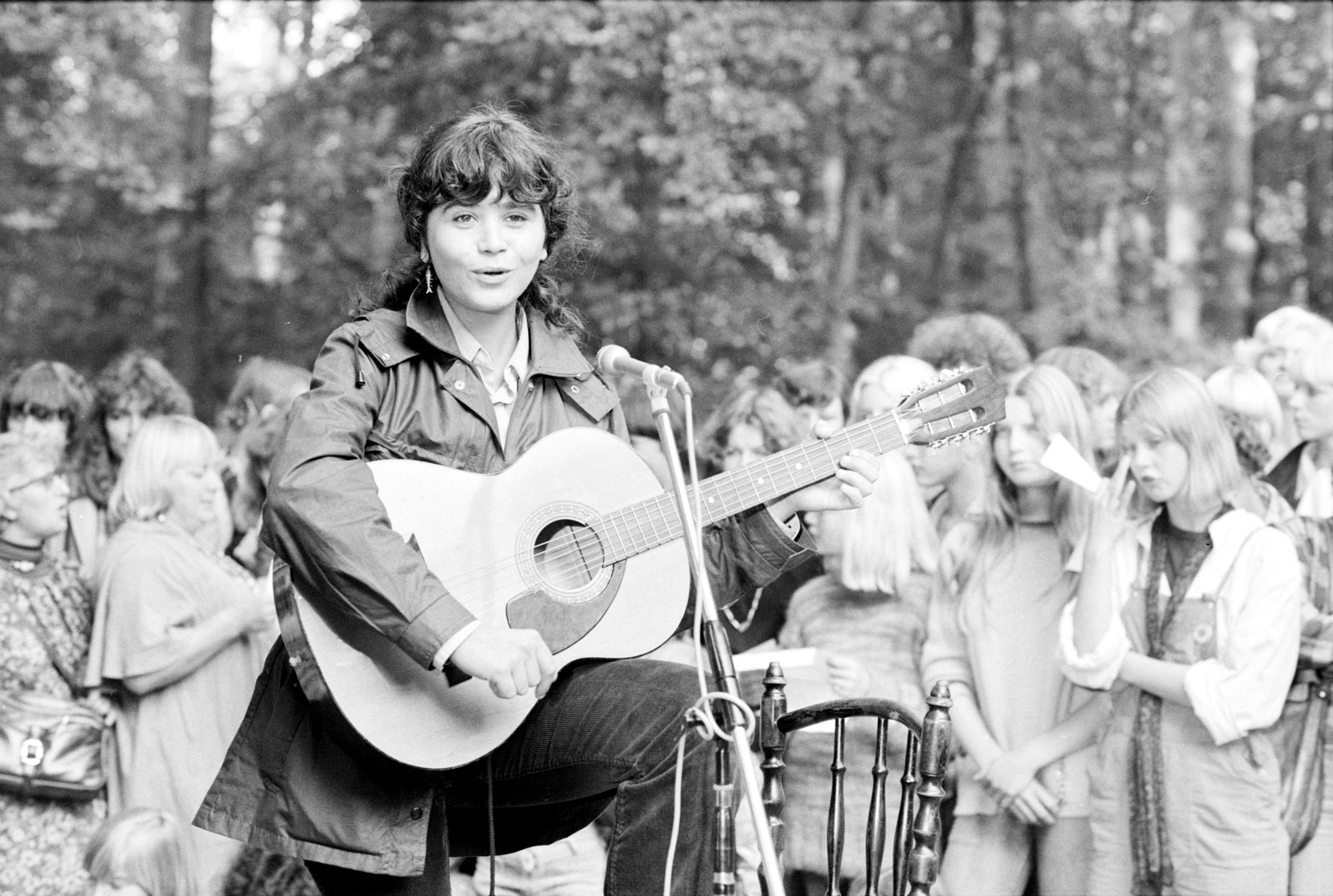
The filming of A woman like Eve in 1978

Around the same time, Schneider agreed to star in Luis Buñuel's That Obscure Object of Desire (1977), and showed up on set, yet argued with the filmmaker over how her role would be portrayed in light of Schneider's growing concern regarding the depiction of women in cinema, and because of excessive nudity. Schneider ultimately dropped out, and Buñuel made the creative, unusual decision to replace her with not one but two actresses for the same role: Carole Bouquet and Ángela Molina. Schneider was also asked by Bertolucci to appear in his 1976 film 1900, but either turned him down or was fired. She was asked to play Mary, mother of Jesus in Franco Zeffirelli's 1977 television miniseries Jesus of Nazareth; Schneider said she did not feel right for the part, though later regretted missing out on this opportunity, and instead eventually appeared in Zeffirelli's 1996 film Jane Eyre in a brief appearance as Bertha Mason.

For the rest of the 1970s, Schneider opted to star in small-budgeted, independent European productions, such as the little-seen Swiss period piece Violanta (1976, with a young Gérard Depardieu), and three consciously feministic works: the Italian production I Belong to Me (Io Sono Mia) (1978, with Stefania Sandrelli); the graphic, disturbing Memoirs of a French Whore (French title: La Dérobade) (1978, alongside Miou-Miou, and for which Schneider was nominated for Best Supporting Actress at the 1980 5th César Awards); and the lesbian Dutch drama A Woman Like Eve, directed by Nouchka van Brakel, where Schneider plays the bohemian love interest of conflicted Monique van de Ven who is married to and has children with Peter Faber.

Towards the end of the decade, famed arthouse director Jacques Rivette met Schneider at a cafe on the Champs-Elysées and asked her what kind of movie she'd like to make with him, to which Schneider replied "a thriller"; Rivette then asked which actor she'd like to star opposite, and she suggested her friend Joe Dallesandro, renowned for his association with Andy Warhol and leading performances in Paul Morrissey's films. The result was the vague, symbolic crime drama Merry-Go-Round, a troubled production during which Schneider and Rivette were both overcome by ill health and personal issues. Schneider left production without completing her scenes and had to be replaced with a double. The film was finally released in 1981 to mediocre reviews.

=== The 1980s ===
The 1980s were a much quieter period for Schneider, both personally and professionally. Following increasing issues with her drug use (including cocaine, LSD, and heroin) and a suicide attempt in the '70s (in the looming shadow of Last Tango in Paris, which Esther Anderson, friend and one-time girlfriend of Marlon Brando, said "ruined [Maria's] life"), Schneider once and for all overcame these problems by the early '80s - which she accredited to her "angel", which may have been life-partner Maria Pia. The beginning of the decade saw the actress appearing in a campy Belgian vampire comedy with Louise Fletcher, Mama Dracula (1980), which received universally negative reviews from critics. The same year, she performed alongside Klaus Kinski in the French thriller Hate (Haine).

Schneider starred in Peacetime in Paris in 1981, a Yugoslavian picture set in the French capital, which follows a documentarian researching the history of Nazism in Paris; there he meets and falls in love with Schneider's mysterious character, who helps him out on his quest. The picture won a Special Prize at the 12th Moscow International Film Festival, and also featured Schneider's father, Daniel Gélin, in a supporting role as a taxi driver. None of his scenes, however, are shared with Maria.

In 1982, she offered performances in two comedies, the Italian Looking for Jesus (Cercasi Gesù), with Fernando Rey, and the French Stray Bullets (Balles perdues). Starting from 1984, Schneider began appearing more regularly in European television movies and shows, such as 1985's A Song for Europe (a.k.a. A Crime of Honour) with a young David Suchet of Agatha Christie's Poirot fame, while doing supporting roles in cinematic turns like the Japanese production of The Princess & the Photographer (1984).

Towards the end of the 1980s, Schneider had substantial roles in the French thriller Résidence surveillée (1987) and the post-apocalyptic surrealistic comedy Bunker Palace Hôtel (1989) with three other legends of French cinema: Jean-Louis Trintignant, Carole Bouquet, and Jean-Pierre Léaud (the latter of which was Schneider's obsessive filmmaker fiancé in Last Tango in Paris.)

== Personal life ==
In 1973, Schneider came out as bisexual. She told The New York Times in February 1973:

I left my mother's home when I was 15, and I had my first affair at 16—we did everything, but not penetration. Now I'm bisexual completely, and I've had quite a few lovers for my age. More men than women. Probably 50 men and 20 women. I'm incapable of fidelity; have a need for a million experiences. Women I love more for beauty than for sex. Men I love for grace and intelligence.

In early 1976, she abandoned the film set of Caligula (reportedly due to its pornographic content, saying "I am an actress, not a prostitute!") and checked herself into a mental hospital in Rome for several days to be with her then-lover, photographer Joan Patrice Townsend daughter of author Robert Townsend. This, coupled with her refusal to perform nude, led to Schneider's dismissal from the film. The 1970s were turbulent years for Schneider, marked by excessive drug use and a suicide attempt. Schneider said that she disliked the instant fame accorded to her from Last Tango in Paris. She suffered abuse and began taking drugs.

I was rock 'n' roll. About drugs, we did not know at the time, it was so dangerous. There was an ideal, to change society and especially a thirst for novelty ... I have lost seven years of my life and I regret it bitterly ... I started using drugs when I became famous. I did not like the celebrity, and especially the image full of innuendo, naughty, that people had of me after Last Tango. In addition, I had no family behind me, who protect you ... I suffered abuse. People who come up to tell you unpleasant things on planes. I was tracked down, and I felt hounded.

Sometime after finding renewed stability in her life in the 1980s, she started a long-term relationship with Maria Pia which lasted until Schneider's death.

== Death ==
Schneider died of cancer on 3 February 2011 at age 58. Her funeral was held on 10 February 2011 at the Church of Saint-Roch, Paris. In addition to her partner Maria Pia Almadio, half-siblings Fiona and Manuel Gélin, and her uncle Georges Schneider, the funeral was attended by actors, directors, and producers in French cinema such as Dominique Besnehard, Bertrand Blier, Christine Boisson, Claudia Cardinale, Alain Delon, and Andréa Ferreol. Delon read a tribute from Brigitte Bardot. Schneider was cremated afterwards at Père Lachaise crematorium, and her ashes were to be scattered at sea at the foot of the Rock of the Virgin in Biarritz, according to her last wishes.

== Legacy and honours ==
In 2001, Schneider was the guest of honor at the 23rd Festival Créteil Films de Femmes. In a master class at the festival, she called film "a tracing of memory", and said that women must be recognized as actors and directors. She also brought attention to the importance of assisting senior French actors who become unemployed and impoverished. Schneider was chosen the same year as vice-president of La Roue Tourne, an organization in Paris that supports senior French actors and directors. According to Schneider, Marcel Carné, director of Children of Paradise (1945) and one of the most important directors of the late 1930s, would have died in poverty but for La Roue Tourne supporting him for the last 10 years of his life.

On 1 July 2010, Schneider was awarded the medal of Chevalier, Ordre des Arts et des Lettres, for her contributions to the arts by Minister of Culture and Communication, Frédéric Mitterrand. He had acted with her in Jacques Rivette's film, Merry-Go-Round (1981).

After Schneider's death, Patti Smith released a song on her 2012 album Banga called "Maria", which was dedicated both to the actress and nostalgic memories of the 1970s.

In 2018, her cousin Vanessa Schneider published Tu t'appelais Maria Schneider, a book about her.

On 2 February 1983, Schneider participated in an interview for the TV show Cinéma, Cinémas, which asked her about the filming of Last Tango in Paris. Elisabeth Subrin based a 60-second short film on that interview, which became part of a compilation for Strand Releasing's 30th Anniversary. The 1983 Maria Schneider interview for Cinéma, Cinémas is now the basis for Subrin's 25-minute work, Maria Schneider, 1983, which premiered at the 2022 Cannes Film Festival in the Director's Fortnight section.

In 2024, her life story was adapted into the French film Being Maria, in which Schneider is portrayed by Anamaria Vartolomei.

== Filmography ==
=== Films ===
Film
Year	Title	English Translation/ Also Known As	Role	Language	Notes
1969	L'Arbre de Noël	The Christmas Tree		French	Uncredited
1969	Les Femmes			French	Uncredited
1970	Madly		La jeune acheteuse	French	
1971	Les jambes en l'air	César Grandblaise	Sarah Grandblaise	French	
1972	La Vieille Fille	The Old Maid	Mome	French, German	
1972	Hellé	Nicole	Nicole	French	
1972	What a Flash!			French	
1972	Ultimo tango a Parigi	Last Tango in Paris	Jeanne	French, English	
1973	Reigen	Merry-Go-Round	Das süße Mädel	German	
1973	Cari genitori	Dear Parents	Antonia	Italian, English	
1975	Professione: reporter	The Passenger	The Girl	English, German, Spanish	
1975	La Baby-Sitter	The Babysitter; The Raw Edge; Scar Tissue; Wanted: Babysitter	Michèle	English	
1977	Violanta		Laura	French	
1978	Voyage au jardin des morts		Hypolyte	French	
1978	Io sono mia	I Belong to Me	Suna	Spanish	
1979	Een vrouw als Eva	A Woman Like Eve	Liliane	Dutch	
1979	La Dérobade	The Getaway; The Life; Memoirs of a French Whore	Maloup	French	
1980	Haine	Hate	Madeleine	French	
1980	Mama Dracula	Mother Dracula	Nancy Hawaii	French, English	
1980	Weiße Reise	White Travel		German	
1981	Une saison de paix à Paris	Peacetime in Paris; Sezona mira u Parizu	Elen	French, Serbian	
1981	Merry-Go-Round		Leo	English, French	
1981	La chanson du mal aimé			French	
1982	Cercasi Gesù	Looking for Jesus; L'imposteur	Francesca	Italian	
1982	Balles perdues	Stray Bullets	Véra	French	
1984	Princess & the Photographer	Yoroppa tokkyu		English, Japanese	
1987	Résidence surveillée		Céline Fontaine	French	
1989	Bunker Palace Hôtel		Muriel		
1991	The Conviction		Gitana		
1991	Écrans de Sable	Sand Screens	Sarah	French	
1992	Au pays des Juliets	In the Country of Juliets	Raissa		
1992	Les Nuits fauves	Savage Nights	Noria	French	
1996	Jane Eyre		Bertha	English	
1998	Something to Believe In		Maria Faccino	English	
2000	Les Acteurs	The Actors	Herself	French	
2002	La Repentie	The Repentant	Charlotte's sister	French	
2004	Au large de Bad Ragaz		Anna		
2006	Perds pas la boule!		Thelda	French	Short film
2006	Quale amore		Marie	Italian	
2007	La Vie d'artiste	The Life of the Artist	L'épouse de Joseph Costals	French	Cameo appearance
2007	La clef	The Key	Solange	French	
2008	Cliente	Client; A French Gigolo	Marie-Hélène	French	

=== Television ===
Television
Year	Title	Role	Notes
1984	Buio nella valle		Miniseries
1985	A Song for Europe		TV film, a.k.a. A Crime of Honour
1987	Résidence surveillée		
1987	L'or noir de Lornac		
1988	Silvia è sola		TV movie
1993	Contrôle d'identité		TV movie
1995	Navarro	Samira	Episode: "L'ombre d'un père"
1998	Angelo nero		TV movie
1998	Il cuore e la spada	Queen Maga of Ireland	TV movie
2004	Maigret		
2008	A.D. La guerre de l'ombre		Miniseries
