= Chris Brown discography =

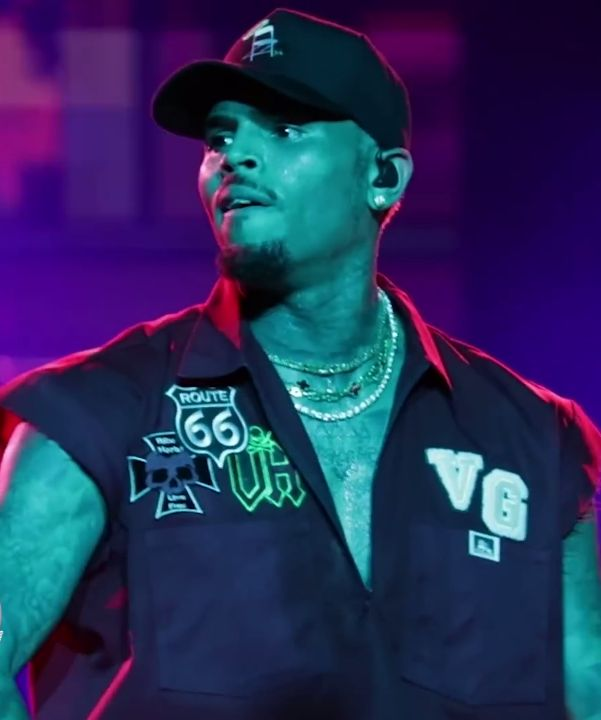
- Brown performing at Jamaica National Stadium, 2023
- Studio albums: 12
- Collaborative albums: 1
- Mixtapes: 9
- EPs: 1
- Singles: 68
- Promotional singles: 30

American R&B singer-songwriter Chris Brown has released 12 studio albums, 1 collaborative album, 9 mixtapes, 1 extended play, 68 singles (including 390 as a featured artist and guest appearances) and 30 promotional singles.

According to Billboard, Brown has the tenth most Hot 100 entries on the chart with 125. As of January 2026, he has had 54 top 40 entries on the Hot 100 and 17 top 10 entries. Brown is the singer with the tenth-most consecutive weeks on the Hot 100 chart (161 weeks). According to the Recording Industry Association of America (RIAA), he is the tenth-best selling digital singles artist in the United States with sales of 141.5 million.

Brown's self-titled debut album, Chris Brown was released on November 29, 2005; it peaked at number two on the US Billboard 200 and was later certified quadruple platinum in the United States, platinum in Australia, and gold in Canada and the United Kingdom. The album's lead single, "Run It!" featuring Juelz Santana, peaked atop the US Billboard Hot 100, spending a month atop the chart. Internationally, the single charted at the top or in the top ten of several charts. Chris Brown also included the US top ten singles: "Yo (Excuse Me Miss)" and "Say Goodbye"; as well as the US R&B top 5 singles: "Gimme That" featuring Lil Wayne, and "Poppin'".

Brown released his second album, Exclusive on November 6, 2007. It followed in the steps of its predecessor, reaching the top ten into the several countries. Exclusive was certified quadruple platinum in the United States, double platinum in Australia, and platinum in the United Kingdom. The album also generated the singles "Kiss Kiss" featuring T-Pain, "With You" and "Forever". In addition, it contained the top five US R&B singles: "Take You Down", and "Superhuman" featuring Keri Hilson;, which this song has reached the top 30 into several countries. The album also included the single "Wall to Wall". On December 8, 2009, Brown released his third album Graffiti; which peaked into the top 10 on the US Billboard 200. It preceded the album with the release of the lead single, "I Can Transform Ya" featuring Lil Wayne and Swizz Beatz; which the song peaked within the top 20 on several countries. "Crawl" was also released as the second single from the album.

Brown released his fourth studio album F.A.M.E. on March 18, 2011; which became his first album to reach the number one on the US Billboard 200. It was certified triple platinum in the United States, platinum in Australia and gold in Ireland. Its lead single, "Yeah 3x" has reached the top 10 into several countries. The album's second single, "Look at Me Now" featuring Lil Wayne and Busta Rhymes; which became Brown's first top 10 single on the Billboard Hot 100 since 2008. F.A.M.E. has also spawned four other singles: "Beautiful People" featuring Benny Benassi, "She Ain't You", "Next to You" featuring Justin Bieber, and "Wet the Bed" featuring Ludacris. With only a mixtape cut of the single, "Deuces" featuring Tyga and Kevin McCall; has charted the top 20 on the Billboard Hot 100, and became Brown's first number one on the Hot R&B/Hip-Hop Songs chart since 2006. Brown released his fifth studio album, Fortune on July 3, 2012; which became his second number one album on the US Billboard 200. The album also spawned the US top 10 singles: "Turn Up the Music" and "Don't Wake Me Up".

Brown's sixth studio album, X was released on September 16, 2014, and was preceded by five singles: The lead single, "Fine China", reached the top ten in Australia, and was later certified gold by the Australian Recording Industry Association (ARIA). "Don't Think They Know" was released as the second single from the album, featuring the previously unreleased vocals from a late Aaliyah. The third single, "Love More" featuring Nicki Minaj; which reached the top 10 in Australia, being certified platinum by the ARIA. "Loyal" featuring Lil Wayne was the highest-charting single from the album, giving Brown his first top 10 single on the Billboard Hot 100 since "Don't Wake Me Up". "Loyal" has been certified six times platinum by the RIAA. The fifth and final single from X, was titled "New Flame" featuring Usher and Rick Ross.

After releasing the mixtape Fan of a Fan together in 2010, Brown and rapper Tyga released a collaborative album in 2015, each artist's first, titled Fan of a Fan: The Album. The album reached number 7 on the Billboard 200, becoming his joint-lowest charting album since Graffiti. Fan of a Fan: The Album has spawned the single "Ayo"; which was a commercial success in the United Kingdom, peaking at number 6 on the UK Singles Chart, and later being certified 2× Platinum by the BPI. On October 7, 2021 Fan of a Fan: The Album was certified gold by the RIAA.

Brown's seventh studio album, Royalty was released on December 18, 2015, and was preceded by four singles: "Liquor", which subsequently peaked at number 60 on the Billboard Hot 100. It was followed by two more singles: "Zero" and "Back to Sleep". The former peaked at number 80 on the Billboard Hot 100, and the latter debuted at number 20. "Fine by Me", was released as the album's fourth and final single on November 27, 2015. In 2016, Royalty was certified gold by the RIAA.

In 2017, Brown released his eighth studio album, Heartbreak on a Full Moon. One week after its release Heartbreak on a Full Moon was certified gold by the Recording Industry Association of America for combined sales and album-equivalent units of over 500,000 units in the United States, and Brown became the first R&B male artist that went gold in a week since Jamie Foxx's Unpredictable in 2005. The album has been certified double platinum by the Recording Industry Association of America (RIAA).

His ninth studio album Indigo was released in 2019 and debuted at number one on the US Billboard 200 with 108,000 album-equivalent units, which included 28,000 pure album sales in its first week. The album is his third number-one album in the country, and included five singles: "Undecided", "Back to Love", "Wobble Up", featuring Nicki Minaj and G-Eazy, "No Guidance", featuring Drake, "Heat", featuring Gunna. On December 9, 2019 Indigo was certified platinum by the RIAA. His single "Go Crazy" released the following year, alongside Young Thug as part of their collaborative mixtape Slime & B, reached number 3 on the Hot 100. In 2022, his Indigo album spawned a sleeper hit with its song "Under the Influence", which was re-released as a single.

In June 2022, Brown released his tenth studio album Breezy. The album debuted at number four on the US Billboard 200. He then released his eleventh studio album 11:11 in November 2023, and it debuted at number nine on the US Billboard 200. Three years later, he released his twelfth studio album Brown in May 2026, which debuted at number 7 on the Billboard 200, making it his thirteenth consecutive top-ten album in the country.

== Albums ==
=== Studio albums ===
List of studio albums, with selected chart positions, sales figures and certifications
Title	Album details	Peak chart positions											Sales	Certifications
Title	Album details	US	US R&B/ HH	AUS	CAN	FRA	GER	IRE	NLD	NZ	SWI	UK	Sales	Certifications
Chris Brown	Released: November 29, 2005 (US); Label: CBE, Jive; Formats: CD, LP, cassette, digital download, streaming	2	1	57	39	51	31	71	47	8	18	29	US: 2,199,000 (Note: Sales as of July 2012.)	RIAA: 4× Platinum; ARIA: Platinum; BPI: Gold; MC: Gold; RMNZ: 3× Platinum
Exclusive	Released: November 6, 2007 (US); Label: CBE, Jive; Formats: CD, cassette, digital download, streaming	4	2	5	16	53	91	2	68	3	28	3	US: 2,014,000	RIAA: 4× Platinum; ARIA: 2× Platinum; BPI: Platinum; IRMA: 2× Platinum; RMNZ: 4× Platinum
Graffiti	Released: December 8, 2009 (US); Label: CBE, Jive; Formats: CD, digital download, streaming	7	1	40	84	134	—	47	83	40	—	55	US: 362,000	RIAA: Gold; BPI: Silver; RMNZ: Gold
F.A.M.E.	Released: March 22, 2011 (US); Label: CBE, Jive; Formats: CD, digital download, streaming	1	1	3	6	44	39	8	16	7	34	10	US: 872,000 (Note: Sales as of May 2012.); UK: 200,000 (Note: Sales as of March 2012.)	RIAA: 3× Platinum; ARIA: Platinum; BPI: Platinum; IRMA: Gold; RMNZ: 3× Platinum
Fortune	Released: July 3, 2012 (US); Label: CBE, RCA; Formats: CD, digital download, streaming	1	1	2	6	8	13	4	1	1	10	1	US: 465,000 (Note: Sales as of December 2013.)	RIAA: Platinum; ARIA: Gold; BPI: Gold; RMNZ: Platinum
X	Released: September 16, 2014 (US); Label: CBE, RCA; Formats: CD, digital download, streaming	2	1	4	2	6	11	5	5	3	3	4	US: 404,000 (Note: Sales as of December 2015.)	RIAA: 2× Platinum; ARIA: Gold; BPI: Gold; RMNZ: 3× Platinum
Royalty	Released: December 18, 2015; Label: CBE, RCA; Formats: CD, digital download, streaming	3	1	14	17	81	37	51	21	16	15	23	US: 360,000 (Note: Sales as of February 2016.)	RIAA: Platinum; ARIA: Gold; BPI: Gold; RMNZ: 2× Platinum
Heartbreak on a Full Moon	Released: October 31, 2017; Label: CBE, RCA; Formats: CD, digital download, streaming	3	1	5	10	29	35	18	15	3	29	10	US: 105,000 (Note: Sales as of December 2018.)	RIAA: 2× Platinum; ARIA: Platinum; BPI: Gold; MC: Platinum; RMNZ: 3× Platinum; SNEP: Gold
Indigo	Released: June 28, 2019; Label: CBE, RCA; Formats: CD, digital download, streaming	1	1	3	2	29	31	23	11	3	9	7	US: 84,000 (Note: Sales as of December 2019.)	RIAA: 3× Platinum; ARIA: Gold; BPI: Gold; MC: Gold; RMNZ: 4× Platinum; SNEP: Gold
Breezy	Released: June 24, 2022; Label: CBE, RCA; Formats: CD, digital download, streaming	4	2	6	7	39	25	41	6	2	9	6	US: 5,000 (Note: Sales as of July 2022.)	RIAA: Gold; BPI: Silver; RMNZ: Platinum
11:11	Released: November 10, 2023; Label: CBE, RCA; Formats: LP, digital download, streaming	9	2	16	34	49	38	41	6	2	9	11	US: 6,000 (Note: Sales as of November 2023.)	BPI: Gold; RMNZ: Platinum
Brown	Released: May 8, 2026; Label: CBE, RCA; Formats: LP, digital download, streaming	7	3	16	16	58	77	89	17	5	7	17	US: 5,000 (Note: Sales as of May 2026.)	
"—" denotes a recording that did not chart or was not released in that territory.

=== Collaborative albums ===
List of collaborative albums, with selected chart positions, sales figures and certifications
Title	Album details	Peak chart positions											Sales	Certifications
Title	Album details	US	US R&B/ HH	AUS	CAN	FRA	GER	IRE	NLD	NZ	SWI	UK	Sales	Certifications
Fan of a Fan: The Album (with Tyga)	Released: February 24, 2015 (US); Label: CBE, RCA, Last Kings, Young Money, Cash Money, Republic; Formats: CD, digital download, streaming	7	3	3	11	33	14	31	30	9	6	7	US: 72,000 (Note: Sales as of March 2015.)	RIAA: Gold; ARIA: Gold; BPI: Gold; RMNZ: Platinum

== Mixtapes ==
List of mixtapes with selected details
Title	Album details
In My Zone (Rhythm & Streets) (hosted by DJ Drama and DJ Sense)	Released: February 14, 2010; Label: CBE; Formats: CD, digital download
Fan of a Fan (with Tyga) (hosted by DJ Ill Will and DJ Rockstar)	Released: May 16, 2010; Label: CBE, Tyga Music; Formats: CD, digital download
In My Zone 2 (hosted by DJ Drama and DJ Babey Drew)	Released: November 27, 2010; Label: CBE; Formats: Digital download
Boy in Detention	Released: August 5, 2011; Label: CBE; Formats: Digital download
X Files	Released: November 19, 2013; Label: CBE; Formats: Digital download
Before the Party	Released: November 27, 2015; Label: CBE; Formats: Digital download, streaming
Before the Trap: Nights in Tarzana (with OHB)	Released: April 29, 2016; Label: CBE; Formats: Digital download, streaming
Attack the Block (with OHB and Section Boyz)	Released: October 28, 2016; Label: CBE; Formats: Digital download

=== Commercial mixtapes ===
List of commercial mixtapes with selected details
Title	Album details	Peak chart positions									Certifications
Title	Album details	US	US R&B/ HH	AUS	CAN	FRA	NLD	NZ	SWI	UK	Certifications
Slime & B (with Young Thug)	Released: May 5, 2020; Label: CBE, RCA, YSL, 300, Atlantic; Formats: Digital download, streaming	24	15	29	46	110	38	37	51	51	RMNZ: Platinum

== Extended plays ==
List of extended plays with selected details
Title	Album details
Royalty International	Released: December 25, 2015; Label: CBE, RCA; Formats: Digital download, streaming

== Singles ==
=== As lead artist ===
List of singles as lead artist, with selected chart positions and certifications, showing year released and album name
Title	Year	Peak chart positions										Certifications	Album
Title	Year	US	US R&B/ HH	AUS	FRA	GER	IRE	NLD	NZ	SWI	UK	Certifications	Album
"Run It!" (featuring Juelz Santana)	2005	1	1	1	19	5	2	9	1	5	2	RIAA: 5× Platinum; RIAA: Platinum (Mastertone); ARIA: 3× Platinum; BPI: Platinum; BVMI: Gold; MC: Gold (Ringtone); RMNZ: 3× Platinum	Chris Brown
"Yo (Excuse Me Miss)"	2005	7	2	10	—	56	15	67	9	34	13	RIAA: 4× Platinum; RIAA: Platinum (Mastertone); ARIA: Platinum; BPI: Platinum; RMNZ: 4× Platinum	Chris Brown
"Gimme That" (Remix) (featuring Lil Wayne)	2006	15	5	—	45	47	26	94	—	30	23	RIAA: 2× Platinum; RIAA: Gold (Mastertone); BPI: Silver; RMNZ: Platinum	Chris Brown
"Say Goodbye"	2006	10	1	—	—	—	—	—	—	—	—	RIAA: 3× Platinum; RIAA: Platinum (Mastertone); BPI: Silver; RMNZ: Platinum	Chris Brown
"Poppin'"	2006	42	5	—	—	—	—	—	—	—	—	RIAA: Platinum; RIAA: Gold (Mastertone); RMNZ: Platinum	Chris Brown
"Wall to Wall"	2007	79	22	21	—	59	47	—	15	87	75	RIAA: Platinum; ARIA: Platinum; RMNZ: Platinum	Exclusive
"Kiss Kiss" (featuring T-Pain)	2007	1	2	8	—	—	26	—	1	69	38	RIAA: 6× Platinum; RIAA: Platinum (Mastertone); ARIA: 3× Platinum; BPI: Gold; MC: 2× Platinum (Ringtone); RMNZ: 3× Platinum	Exclusive
"With You"	2007	2	5	5	11	33	3	56	1	24	8	RIAA: 6× Platinum; RIAA: 2× Platinum (Mastertone); ARIA: 4× Platinum; BPI: 2× Platinum; MC: Gold (Ringtone); RMNZ: 4× Platinum	Exclusive
"No Air" (with Jordin Sparks)	2008	3	4	1	—	10	2	17	1	8	3	RIAA: Platinum; RIAA: Platinum (Mastertone); ARIA: Platinum; BPI: 2× Platinum; BVMI: Gold; MC: Platinum; MC: Gold (Ringtone); RMNZ: 4× Platinum	Jordin Sparks
"Take You Down"	2008	43	4	—	—	—	—	—	7	—	92	RIAA: 2× Platinum; BPI: Silver; RMNZ: Platinum	Exclusive
"Forever"	2008	2	66	7	25	20	1	51	1	22	4	RIAA: 8× Platinum; RIAA: Gold (Mastertone); ARIA: 5× Platinum; BPI: 2× Platinum; RMNZ: 6× Platinum	Exclusive
"Superhuman" (featuring Keri Hilson)	2008	— (Note: "Superhuman" did not enter the Billboard Hot 100, but peaked at number 9 on the Bubbling Under Hot 100 Singles chart, which acts as an extension to the Hot 100.)	—^{[A]}	30	—	—	15	—	15	—	32	RIAA: Gold; ARIA: Platinum; RMNZ: Gold	Exclusive
"I Can Transform Ya" (featuring Lil Wayne and Swizz Beatz)	2009	20	11	21	—	—	21	57	7	—	26	RIAA: 2× Platinum; ARIA: Platinum; BPI: Silver; RMNZ: Platinum	Graffiti
"Crawl"	2009	53	59	67	—	—	39	—	16	—	35	RIAA: Gold; ARIA: Gold; RMNZ: Gold	Graffiti
"Deuces" (featuring Tyga and Kevin McCall)	2010	14	1	—	—	—	—	—	23	—	68	RIAA: 4× Platinum; BPI: Gold; RMNZ: 2× Platinum	F.A.M.E.
"Yeah 3x"	2010	15	—^{[B]}	4	59	7	8	22	1	7	6	RIAA: 3× Platinum; ARIA: 6× Platinum; BPI: Platinum; BVMI: Gold; IFPI SWI: Platinum; RMNZ: Platinum	F.A.M.E.
"No Bullshit"	2011	62	3	—	—	—	—	—	—	—	—	RIAA: Platinum	F.A.M.E.
"Look at Me Now" (featuring Lil Wayne and Busta Rhymes)	2011	6	1	46	85	—	—	—	37	—	44	RIAA: Diamond; ARIA: 2× Platinum; BPI: Gold; RMNZ: 2× Platinum	F.A.M.E.
"Beautiful People" (featuring Benny Benassi)	2011	43	—^{[C]}	7	26	30	3	25	6	26	4	RIAA: Platinum; ARIA: 3× Platinum; BPI: 2× Platinum; BVMI: Gold; RMNZ: Gold	F.A.M.E.
"She Ain't You"	2011	27	5	27	—	—	—	—	27	—	53	RIAA: 2× Platinum; BPI: Silver; ARIA: Platinum; RMNZ: Platinum	F.A.M.E.
"Next to You" (featuring Justin Bieber)	2011	26	—	22	—	28	21	—	11	74	14	RIAA: 2× Platinum; ARIA: 2× Platinum; BPI: Platinum; RMNZ: 2× Platinum	F.A.M.E.
"Wet the Bed" (featuring Ludacris)	2011	77	6	—	—	—	—	—	—	—	—	RIAA: Platinum; RMNZ: Gold	F.A.M.E.
"Strip" (featuring Kevin McCall)	2011	37	3	76	—	—	—	95	—	—	78	RIAA: 2× Platinum; ARIA: Platinum; RMNZ: Platinum	Fortune
"Turn Up the Music"	2012	10	81	6	39	34	12	30	9	39	1	RIAA: 2× Platinum; ARIA: 3× Platinum; BPI: Gold; RMNZ: Gold	Fortune
"Sweet Love"	2012	89	25	—	—	—	—	—	—	—	—	RIAA: Gold	Fortune
"Till I Die" (featuring Big Sean and Wiz Khalifa)	2012	— (Note: "Till I Die" did not enter the Billboard Hot 100, but peaked at number 1 on the Bubbling Under Hot 100 Singles chart, which acts as an extension to the Hot 100.)	12	—	—	—	—	—	—	—	—	RIAA: Gold	Fortune
"Don't Wake Me Up"	2012	10	—	2	11	11	4	37	2	12	2	RIAA: 3× Platinum; ARIA: 4× Platinum; BPI: Platinum; BVMI: Gold; RMNZ: Platinum	Fortune
"Don't Judge Me"	2012	67	18	42	22	38	—	—	—	—	42	RIAA: 2× Platinum; ARIA: Gold; BPI: Silver; RMNZ: Gold	Fortune
"Fine China"	2013	31	10	26	43	—	65	56	21	—	23	RIAA: Platinum; ARIA: Platinum; BPI: Silver; RMNZ: Platinum	X
"Don't Think They Know" (featuring Aaliyah)	2013	81	29	—	121	—	—	—	—	—	94	RIAA: Platinum; RMNZ: Gold	X
"Love More" (featuring Nicki Minaj)	2013	23	7	29	118	48	—	—	—	—	32	RIAA: 2× Platinum; ARIA: Platinum; BPI: Silver; RMNZ: Gold	X
"Loyal" (featuring Lil Wayne and Tyga)	2013	9	4	42	35	54	49	98	19	—	10	RIAA: 8× Platinum; ARIA: 3× Platinum; BPI: 3× Platinum; BVMI: Platinum; RMNZ: 5× Platinum	X
"New Flame" (featuring Usher and Rick Ross)	2014	27	6	61	75	—	—	— (Note: "New Flame" did not enter the Single Top 100, but peaked at number 8 on the Single Tip chart.)	35	—	10	RIAA: 4× Platinum; ARIA: Platinum; BPI: Gold; RMNZ: 3× Platinum	X
"Ayo" (with Tyga)	2015	21	7	32	32	23	27	45	31	43	6	RIAA: 3× Platinum; ARIA: 2× Platinum; BPI: 2× Platinum; BVMI: Platinum; RMNZ: 3× Platinum	Fan of a Fan: The Album
"Bitches N Marijuana" (with Tyga featuring Schoolboy Q)	2015	— (Note: "Bitches N Marijuana" did not enter the Billboard Hot 100, but peaked at number 3 on the Bubbling Under Hot 100 Singles chart, which acts as an extension to the Hot 100.)	33	49	139	50	—	—	—	—	60	RIAA: Gold; ARIA: Platinum; BPI: Silver; RMNZ: Platinum	Fan of a Fan: The Album
"Five More Hours" (with Deorro)	2015	— (Note: "Five More Hours" did not enter the Billboard Hot 100, but peaked at number 1 on the Bubbling Under Hot 100 Singles chart, which acts as an extension to the Hot 100.)	—	7	31	23	15	34	11	22	4	RIAA: Platinum; ARIA: 4× Platinum; BPI: Platinum; BVMI: Platinum; MC: 3× Platinum; RMNZ: 3× Platinum	Good Evening
"Liquor"	2015	60	19	—	—	—	—	—	—	—	82	RIAA: Platinum; RMNZ: Platinum	Royalty
"Zero"	2015	80	— (Note: "Zero" did not enter the Billboard Hot R&B/Hip-Hop Songs, but peaked at number 1 on the Bubbling Under R&B/Hip-Hop Singles chart, which acts as an extension to the Hot R&B/Hip-Hop Songs.)	—	181	—	—	— (Note: "Zero" did not enter the Single Top 100, but peaked at number 22 on the Single Tip chart.)	—	—	68	RIAA: Gold; RMNZ: Gold	Royalty
"Back to Sleep"	2015	20	5	74	138	—	—	— (Note: "Back to Sleep" did not enter the Single Top 100, but peaked at number 8 on the Single Tip chart.)	38	—	100	RIAA: 4× Platinum; ARIA: Platinum; BPI: Gold; RMNZ: 3× Platinum	Royalty
"Fine by Me"	2015	— (Note: "Fine by Me" did not enter the Billboard Hot 100, but peaked at number 13 on the Bubbling Under Hot 100 Singles chart, which acts as an extension to the Hot 100.)	— (Note: "Fine by Me" did not enter the Billboard Hot R&B/Hip-Hop Songs, but peaked at number 7 on the Bubbling Under R&B/Hip-Hop Singles chart, which acts as an extension to the Hot R&B/Hip-Hop Songs.)	—	—	—	—	97	—	—	76		Royalty
"Paradise" (with Benny Benassi)	2016	— (Note: "Paradise" did not enter the Billboard Hot 100, but peaked at number 21 on the Hot Dance/Electronic Songs chart.)	—	—	—	—	30	—	—	—	40	BPI: Silver	Danceaholic
"Grass Ain't Greener"	2016	71	23	97	—	—	—	—	—	—	100	RIAA: 2× Platinum; ARIA: Platinum; BPI: Silver; RMNZ: 2× Platinum	Heartbreak on a Full Moon
"Party" (featuring Usher and Gucci Mane)	2016	40	14	82	84	—	—	— (Note: "Party" did not enter the Single Top 100, but peaked at number 17 on the Single Tip chart.)	—	—	68	RIAA: 3× Platinum; ARIA: Platinum; BPI: Gold; MC: Gold; RMNZ: 2× Platinum	Heartbreak on a Full Moon
"Privacy"	2017	62	26	61	73	—	—	—	— (Note: "Privacy" did not enter the NZ Top 40 Singles Chart, but peaked at number four on the NZ Heatseeker Singles Chart.)	95	86	RIAA: 3× Platinum; ARIA: Platinum; BPI: Gold; RMNZ: 2× Platinum	Heartbreak on a Full Moon
"Pills & Automobiles" (featuring Yo Gotti, A Boogie wit da Hoodie and Kodak Black)	2017	46	16	—	136	—	—	—	—	—	—	RIAA: 3× Platinum; ARIA: Platinum; BPI: Silver; RMNZ: Platinum	Heartbreak on a Full Moon
"Questions"	2017	78	32	56	138	74	37	43	33	55	12	RIAA: Platinum; ARIA: Platinum; BPI: Platinum; BVMI: Gold; IFPI SWI: Gold; MC: Gold; RMNZ: 2× Platinum	Heartbreak on a Full Moon
"Tempo"	2018	88	36	—	—	—	—	—	—	—	—	RIAA: 2× Platinum; ARIA: Gold; RMNZ: Gold	Heartbreak on a Full Moon
"Stranger Things" (with Joyner Lucas)	2018	91	46	100	—	—	—	—	— (Note: "Stranger Things" did not enter the NZ Top 40 Singles Chart, but peaked at number three on the NZ Heatseeker Singles Chart.)	—	—	RIAA: Gold; RMNZ: Platinum	Non-album singles
"I Don't Die" (with Joyner Lucas)	2018	— (Note: "I Don't Die" did not enter the Billboard Hot 100, but peaked at number 8 on the Bubbling Under Hot 100 Singles chart, which acts as an extension to the Hot 100.)	—	—	—	—	—	—	— (Note: "I Don't Die" did not enter the NZ Top 40 Singles Chart, but peaked at number four on the NZ Heatseeker Singles Chart.)	—	—	RMNZ: Gold	Non-album singles
"Undecided"	2019	35	15	58	150	94	46	43	15	47	15	RIAA: Platinum; BPI: Gold; MC: Gold; RMNZ: Platinum	Indigo
"Back to Love"	2019	—	— (Note: "Back to Love" did not enter the Billboard Hot R&B/Hip-Hop Songs, but peaked at number 16 on the Hot R&B Songs chart.)	—	—	—	—	—	— (Note: "Back to Love" did not enter the NZ Top 40 Singles Chart, but peaked at number 12 on the NZ Hot Singles Chart.)	—	82		Indigo
"Wobble Up" (featuring Nicki Minaj and G-Eazy)	2019	— (Note: "Wobble Up" did not enter the Billboard Hot 100, but peaked at number 3 on the Bubbling Under Hot 100 chart, which acts as an extension to the Hot 100.)	46	—	—	—	—	—	— (Note: "Wobble Up" did not enter the NZ Top 40 Singles Chart, but peaked at number 15 on the NZ Hot Singles Chart.)	—	—	RIAA: Gold; RMNZ: Gold	Indigo
"No Guidance" (featuring Drake)	2019	5	2	7	118	63	19	36	5	29	6	RIAA: Diamond (11× Platinum); ARIA: 4× Platinum; BPI: 2× Platinum; BVMI: Gold; IFPI SWI: Gold; MC: 3× Platinum; RMNZ: 5× Platinum; SNEP: Platinum	Indigo
"Heat" (featuring Gunna)	2019	36	15	—	—	—	—	—	— (Note: "Heat" did not enter the NZ Top 40 Singles Chart, but peaked at number 11 on the NZ Hot Singles Chart.)	—	—	RIAA: 4× Platinum; BPI: Silver; RMNZ: Platinum	Indigo
"Go Crazy" (with Young Thug)	2020	3	1	9	—	—	26	47	2	59	10	RIAA: 6× Platinum; ARIA: 2× Platinum; BPI: 2× Platinum; IFPI SWI: Gold; MC: 2× Platinum; RMNZ: 6× Platinum; SNEP: Gold	Slime & B
"Say You Love Me" (with Young Thug)	2020	—	—	—	—	—	—	—	—	—	—		Slime & B
"Iffy"	2022	71	25	—	—	—	—	—	— (Note: "Iffy" did not enter the NZ Top 40 Singles Chart, but peaked at number three on the NZ Hot Singles Chart.)	—	75		Breezy
"WE (Warm Embrace)"	2022	79	22	—	—	—	—	—	— (Note: "WE (Warm Embrace)" did not enter the NZ Top 40 Singles Chart, but peaked at number four on the NZ Hot Singles Chart.)	—	—	RIAA: Gold; RMNZ: Gold	Breezy
"Call Me Every Day" (featuring Wizkid)	2022	76	20	—	—	—	—	— (Note: "Call Me Every Day" did not enter the Dutch Single Top 100, but peaked at number 16 on the Single Tip chart.)	— (Note: "Call Me Every Day" did not enter the NZ Top 40 Singles Chart, but peaked at number 10 on the NZ Hot Singles Chart.)	—	53	RIAA: Platinum; BPI: Silver; IFPI SWI: Gold; MC: Platinum; RMNZ: Platinum	Breezy
"Under the Influence"	2022	12	3	5	20	12	14	24	2	4	7	RIAA: 5× Platinum; ARIA: 4× Platinum; BPI: 2× Platinum; BVMI: Gold; IFPI SWI: 2× Platinum; MC: 3× Platinum; RMNZ: 5× Platinum; SNEP: Diamond	Indigo
"Summer Too Hot"	2023	93	26	—	—	—	—	—	— (Note: "Summer Too Hot" did not enter the NZ Top 40 Singles Chart, but peaked at number four on the NZ Hot Singles Chart.)	—	—	RMNZ: Gold	11:11
"Sensational" (featuring Davido and Lojay)	2023	71	24	—	—	—	—	— (Note: "Sensational" did not enter the Single Top 100, but peaked at number 7 on the Single Tip chart.)	— (Note: "Sensational" did not enter the NZ Top 40 Singles Chart, but peaked at number two on the NZ Hot Singles Chart.)	—	45	BPI: Silver; RMNZ: Gold	11:11
"Nightmares" (featuring Byron Messia)	2023	—	— (Note: "Nightmares" did not enter the Billboard Hot R&B/Hip-Hop Songs, but peaked at number 22 on the Hot R&B Songs chart.)	—	—	—	—	—	— (Note: "Nightmares" did not enter the NZ Top 40 Singles Chart, but peaked at number 25 on the NZ Hot Singles Chart.)	—	73		11:11
"Residuals"	2024	40	10	—	—	—	—	—	— (Note: "Residuals" did not enter the NZ Top 40 Singles Chart, but peaked at number 15 on the NZ Hot Singles Chart.)	—	—	RIAA: Platinum; BPI: Silver; RMNZ: Platinum	11:11
"Holy Blindfold"	2025	89	21	—	—	—	—	—	37	—	55		Brown
"It Depends" (featuring Bryson Tiller)	2025	16	3	—	—	—	—	—	39	—	51	RIAA: Gold; RMNZ: Gold	Brown
"Obvious"	2026	57	13	—	—	—	—	—	— (Note: "Obvious" did not enter the NZ Top 40 Singles Chart, but peaked at number 3 on the NZ Hot Singles Chart.)	—	87		Brown
"Fallin'" (featuring Leon Thomas)	2026	80	26	—	—	—	—	—	31	—	85		Brown
"—" denotes a recording that did not chart or was not released in that territory.

=== As featured artist ===
List of singles as featured artist, with selected chart positions and certifications, showing year released and album name
Title	Year	Peak chart positions										Certifications	Album
Title	Year	US	US R&B/ HH	AUS	CAN	GER	IRE	NLD	NZ	SWI	UK	Certifications	Album
"Shortie Like Mine" (Bow Wow featuring Chris Brown and Johntá Austin)	2006	9	2	36	—	—	—	—	2	—	—	RIAA: Gold; RIAA: Platinum (Mastertone); RMNZ: 2× Platinum	The Price of Fame
"Shawty Get Loose" (Lil Mama featuring Chris Brown and T-Pain)	2008	10	43	41	38	—	—	—	3	—	57	RMNZ: Gold	VYP (Voice of the Young People)
"Get Like Me" (David Banner featuring Chris Brown)	2008	16	7	—	—	—	—	—	—	—	—		The Greatest Story Ever Told
"Feel the Steam" (Elephant Man featuring Chris Brown)	2008	—	—	—	—	—	—	—	—	—	—		Let's Get Physical
"What Them Girls Like" (Ludacris featuring Chris Brown and Sean Garrett)	2008	33	17	98	53	—	—	—	—	—	—	RIAA: Gold	Theater of the Mind
"Make the World Go Round" (Nas featuring Chris Brown and The Game)	2008	—	—^{[E]}	—	—	—	—	—	—	—	—		Untitled
"Freeze" (T-Pain featuring Chris Brown)	2008	38	39	26	45	—	—	—	23	—	62	RMNZ: Gold	Thr33 Ringz
"Head of My Class" (Scooter Smiff featuring Chris Brown)	2008	—	—^{[F]}	—	—	—	—	—	—	—	—		Non-album single
"Work That!" (Teriyaki Boyz featuring Pharrell and Chris Brown)	2009	—	—	—	—	—	—	—	—	—	—		Serious Japanese
"Drop It Low" (Ester Dean featuring Chris Brown)	2009	38	33	—	—	—	—	—	—	—	—		Music Inspired by More than a Game
"Back to the Crib" (Juelz Santana featuring Chris Brown)	2009	— (Note: "Back to the Crib" did not enter the Billboard Hot 100, but peaked at number 24 on the Bubbling Under Hot 100 Singles chart, which acts as an extension to the Hot 100.)	60	—	—	—	—	—	—	—	—		Non-album single
"Make a Movie" (Twista featuring Chris Brown)	2010	71	6	—	—	—	—	—	—	—	—	RIAA: Gold	The Perfect Storm
"Ain't Thinkin' 'Bout You" (Bow Wow featuring Chris Brown)	2010	—^{[H]}	51	—	—	—	—	—	—	—	—	RMNZ: Gold	Fan of a Fan
"Get Back Up" (T.I. featuring Chris Brown)	2010	70	37	91	—	—	—	—	—	—	—		No Mercy
"Champion" (Chipmunk featuring Chris Brown)	2011	—	—	—	—	—	12	—	—	—	2	BPI: Platinum	Transition and F.A.M.E.
"My Last" (Big Sean featuring Chris Brown)	2011	30	4	—	—	—	—	—	—	—	—	RIAA: Platinum; RMNZ: Gold	Finally Famous
"One Night Stand" (Keri Hilson featuring Chris Brown)	2011	—	19	—	—	—	—	—	—	—	—		No Boys Allowed
"Best Love Song" (T-Pain featuring Chris Brown)	2011	33	—	32	—	—	—	—	—	—	40	ARIA: Gold; RMNZ: Platinum	Revolver
"Pot of Gold" (Game featuring Chris Brown)	2011	—^{[I]}	53	—	—	—	—	—	—	72	58		The R.E.D. Album
"Body 2 Body" (Ace Hood featuring Chris Brown)	2011	65	6	—	—	—	—	—	—	—	—		Blood, Sweat & Tears
"Better with the Lights Off" (New Boyz featuring Chris Brown)	2011	38	—	90	—	—	—	—	—	—	—	RIAA: Platinum	Too Cool to Care
"Legendary" (DJ Khaled featuring Chris Brown, Keyshia Cole and Ne-Yo)	2011	—	100	—	—	—	—	—	—	—	—		We the Best Forever
"Another Round" (Fat Joe featuring Chris Brown)	2011	80	5	—	—	—	—	—	—	—	—	RIAA: Gold; RMNZ: Gold	Non-album single
"International Love" (Pitbull featuring Chris Brown)	2011	13	—^{[J]}	15	10	21	8	61	7	13	10	RIAA: 5× Platinum; ARIA: 3× Platinum; BPI: Platinum; BVMI: Platinum; IFPI SWI: Platinum; MC: 3× Platinum; RMNZ: 2× Platinum	Planet Pit
"Birthday Cake" (Rihanna featuring Chris Brown)	2012	24	2	—	—	—	—	—	—	—	—	RIAA: 2× Platinum; ARIA: Gold	Talk That Talk
"Right by My Side" (Nicki Minaj featuring Chris Brown)	2012	51	21	—	—	—	97	—	—	—	70	RIAA: 2× Platinum; ARIA: Platinum; BPI: Silver; RMNZ: Gold	Pink Friday: Roman Reloaded
"Take It to the Head" (DJ Khaled featuring Chris Brown, Rick Ross, Nicki Minaj and Lil Wayne)	2012	58	6	—	—	—	—	—	—	—	—	RIAA: Platinum	Kiss the Ring
"I Can Only Imagine" (David Guetta featuring Chris Brown and Lil Wayne)	2012	44	—	47	35	32	18	98	28	15	18	ARIA: Gold	Nothing but the Beat
"Amazing" (David Banner featuring Chris Brown)	2012	—	—	—	—	—	—	—	—	—	—		Sex, Drugs & Video Games
"Put It Down" (Brandy featuring Chris Brown)	2012	65	3	—	—	—	—	—	—	—	—		Two Eleven
"Algo Me Gusta de Ti" (Wisin & Yandel featuring Chris Brown and T-Pain)	2012	—^{[K]}	—	—	—	—	—	—	—	—	—		Líderes
"Celebration" (The Game featuring Chris Brown, Tyga, Wiz Khalifa and Lil Wayne)	2012	81	24	—	—	—	—	—	—	—	—	RMNZ: Gold	Jesus Piece
"Everyday Birthday" (Swizz Beatz featuring Chris Brown and Ludacris)	2012	—	44	—	—	—	—	—	—	—	—		Non-album singles
"Ready" (Fabolous featuring Chris Brown)	2013	93	28	—	—	—	—	—	—	—	—	RIAA: Gold	Non-album singles
"As Your Friend" (Afrojack featuring Chris Brown)	2013	88	—	—	—	67	20	40	—	—	21		Forget the World
"Shots Fired" (Tank featuring Chris Brown)	2013	—	—	—	—	—	—	—	—	—	—		Non-album single
"For the Road" (Tyga featuring Chris Brown)	2013	— (Note: "For the Road" did not enter the Billboard Hot 100, but peaked at number 15 on the Bubbling Under Hot 100 chart, which acts as an extension to the Hot 100.)	39	—	—	—	—	—	—	—	—		Hotel California
"Beat It" (Sean Kingston featuring Chris Brown and Wiz Khalifa)	2013	52	17	40	—	—	63	—	25	—	—	BPI: Silver; ARIA: Gold; RMNZ: Platinum	Back 2 Life
"Sweet Serenade" (Pusha T featuring Chris Brown)	2013	— (Note: "Sweet Serenade" did not enter the Billboard Hot 100, but peaked at number 19 on the Bubbling Under Hot 100 Singles chart, which acts as an extension to the Hot 100.)	44	—	—	—	—	—	—	—	—		My Name Is My Name
"It Won't Stop" (Sevyn Streeter featuring Chris Brown)	2013	30	9	—	—	—	—	—	—	—	—	RIAA: Platinum; BPI: Silver; RMNZ: 2× Platinum	Call Me Crazy, But...
"Show Me" (Kid Ink featuring Chris Brown)	2013	13	4	46	67	36	—	84	40	32	23	RIAA: 4× Platinum; ARIA: Platinum; BPI: Platinum; BVMI: Gold; MC: Platinum; RMNZ: 2× Platinum	My Own Lane
"Rider" (Ace Hood featuring Chris Brown)	2013	—	—	—	—	—	—	—	—	—	—		Trials & Tribulations
"Episode" (E-40 featuring T.I. and Chris Brown)	2013	—	—	—	—	—	—	—	—	—	—		The Block Brochure: Welcome to the Soil 4
"Talkin' Bout" (Juicy J featuring Chris Brown and Wiz Khalifa)	2014	—	—	—	—	—	—	—	—	—	—		Stay Trippy
"Memory" (Asher Monroe featuring Chris Brown)	2014	—	—	—	—	—	—	—	—	—	—		On My Way, Pt. 1
"Put On My Niggas" (Compton Menace featuring Chris Brown)	2014	—	—	—	—	—	—	—	—	—	—		The Way It Is
"Main Chick" (Kid Ink featuring Chris Brown)	2014	60	16	—	—	99	—	—	—	—	69	RIAA: Platinum; ARIA: Gold; BPI: Silver; MC: Gold; RMNZ: Platinum	My Own Lane
"Hold You Down" (DJ Khaled featuring Chris Brown, August Alsina, Future and Jeremih)	2014	39	10	—	—	—	—	—	—	—	—	RIAA: Platinum; RMNZ: Gold	I Changed a Lot
"Only" (Nicki Minaj featuring Drake, Lil Wayne and Chris Brown)	2014	12	1	62	20	—	—	— (Note: "Only" did not enter the Single Top 100, but peaked at number 20 on the Single Tip chart.)	—	—	35	RIAA: 3× Platinum; ARIA: 3× Platinum; BPI: Platinum; RMNZ: 2× Platinum	The Pinkprint
"Do Not Disturb" (Teyana Taylor featuring Chris Brown)	2014	—	—	—	—	—	—	—	—	—	—	RIAA: Gold	VII
"Post to Be" (Omarion featuring Chris Brown and Jhené Aiko)	2014	13	5	79	49	—	—	— (Note: "Post to Be" did not enter the Single Top 100, but peaked at number 16 on the Single Tip chart.)	—	—	74	RIAA: 6× Platinum; BPI: Platinum; RMNZ: 3× Platinum	Sex Playlist
"Don't Kill the Fun" (Sevyn Streeter featuring Chris Brown)	2015	—	— (Note: "Don't Kill the Fun" did not enter the Billboard Hot R&B/Hip-Hop Songs, but peaked at number 1 on the Bubbling Under R&B/Hip-Hop Singles chart, which acts as an extension to the Hot R&B/Hip-Hop Songs.)	—	—	—	—	—	—	—	—		Shoulda Been There, Pt. 1
"Hotel" (Kid Ink featuring Chris Brown)	2015	96	30	60	—	30	—	— (Note: "Hotel" did not enter the Single Top 100, but peaked at number 21 on the Single Tip chart.)	—	—	43	RIAA: Gold; BPI: Silver; RMNZ: Gold	Full Speed
"Private Show" (T.I. featuring Chris Brown)	2015	— (Note: "Private Show" did not enter the Billboard Hot 100, but peaked at number 18 on the Bubbling Under Hot 100 Singles chart, which acts as an extension to the Hot 100.)	42	—	—	—	—	—	—	—	—		Paperwork
"You Changed Me" (Jamie Foxx featuring Chris Brown)	2015	93	32	—	—	—	—	—	—	—	—		Hollywood: A Story of a Dozen Roses
"Fool Wit It" (Kid Red featuring Chris Brown)	2015	—	—	—	—	—	—	—	—	—	—		Non-album single
"Fun" (Pitbull featuring Chris Brown)	2015	40	—	59	24	36	59	16	—	50	68	RIAA: Platinum; ARIA: Gold; RMNZ: Gold	Globalization
"Do It Again" (Pia Mia featuring Chris Brown and Tyga)	2015	71	—	5	70	—	52	— (Note: "Do It Again" did not enter the Single Top 100, but peaked at number 3 on the Single Tip chart.)	10	—	8	RIAA: Platinum; ARIA: Platinum; BPI: 2× Platinum; RMNZ: 4× Platinum	Non-album single
"How Many Times" (DJ Khaled featuring Chris Brown, Lil Wayne and Big Sean)	2015	68	17	—	—	—	—	—	—	—	—	RIAA: Gold	I Changed a Lot
"All Eyes on You" (Meek Mill featuring Nicki Minaj and Chris Brown)	2015	21	8	51	40	—	76	82	—	—	55	RIAA: 2× Platinum; BPI: Platinum; RMNZ: 2× Platinum	Dreams Worth More Than Money
"Body on Me" (Rita Ora featuring Chris Brown)	2015	— (Note: "Body on Me" did not enter the Billboard Hot 100, but peaked at number 2 on the Bubbling Under Hot 100 Singles chart, which acts as an extension to the Hot 100.)	—	66	91	—	54	— (Note: "Body on Me" did not enter the Single Top 100, but peaked at number 13 on the Single Tip chart.)	—	—	22	BPI: Gold; RMNZ: 2× Platinum	Non-album single
"Moses" (French Montana featuring Chris Brown and Migos)	2015	—	— (Note: "Moses" did not enter the Billboard Hot R&B/Hip-Hop Songs, but peaked at number 1 on the Bubbling Under R&B/Hip-Hop Singles chart, which acts as an extension to the Hot R&B/Hip-Hop Songs.)	—	—	—	—	—	—	—	—		Casino Life 2
"Play No Games" (Big Sean featuring Chris Brown and Ty Dolla $ign)	2015	84	28	—	—	—	—	—	—	—	—	RIAA: Platinum; RMNZ: Gold	Dark Sky Paradise
"Player" (Tinashe featuring Chris Brown)	2015	— (Note: "Player" did not enter the Billboard Hot 100, but peaked at number 3 on the Bubbling Under Hot 100 Singles chart.)	39	90	—	—	—	—	—	—	85	ARIA: Gold	Non-album single
"Sorry" (Rick Ross featuring Chris Brown)	2015	97	32	—	—	—	—	—	—	—	—	RIAA: Gold	Black Market
"Gold Slugs" (DJ Khaled featuring Chris Brown, August Alsina and Fetty Wap)	2015	— (Note: "Gold Slugs" did not enter the Billboard Hot 100, but peaked at number 19 on the Bubbling Under Hot 100 Singles chart, which acts as an extension to the Hot 100.)	49	—	—	—	—	— (Note: "Gold Slugs" did not enter the Single Top 100, but peaked at number 26 on the Single Tip chart.)	—	—	121	RIAA: Gold; ARIA: Gold; RMNZ: Platinum	I Changed a Lot
"#BDAY" (Tank featuring Chris Brown, Siya and Sage the Gemini)	2016	—	—	—	—	—	—	—	—	—	—		Sex Love & Pain II
"Something New" (Zendaya featuring Chris Brown)	2016	93	27	—	—	—	—	—	—	—	—	RMNZ: Gold	Non-album single
"Drifting" (G-Eazy featuring Chris Brown and Tory Lanez)	2016	98	33	—	—	—	—	—	—	—	—	RIAA: Platinum; MC: Gold; RMNZ: Gold	When It's Dark Out
"Bounce" (Kid Red featuring Chris Brown and Migos)	2016	—	—	—	—	—	—	—	—	—	—		Guilty by Association
"Call Me When It's Over" (Rockie Fresh featuring Chris Brown)	2016	—	—	—	—	—	—	—	—	—	—		The Night I Went To...
"Wishing" (DJ Drama featuring Chris Brown, Skeme and LyQuin)	2016	77	29	—	—	—	—	—	—	—	—	RIAA: Gold; RMNZ: Gold	Quality Street Music 2
"I'm the Man (Remix)" (50 Cent featuring Chris Brown)	2016	— (Note: "I'm the Man" did not enter the Billboard Hot 100, but peaked at number 10 on the Bubbling Under Hot 100 Singles chart, which acts as an extension to the Hot 100.)	46	—	—	—	—	—	—	—	—		Non-album singles
"No Romeo No Juliet" (50 Cent featuring Chris Brown)	2016	—	— (Note: "No Romeo No Juliet" did not enter the Billboard Hot R&B/Hip-Hop Songs, but peaked at number 5 on the Bubbling Under R&B/Hip-Hop Singles chart, which acts as an extension to the Hot R&B/Hip-Hop Songs.)	—	—	—	—	—	—	—	—		Non-album singles
"Trap Out The Uber" (Bricc Baby featuring Chris Brown)	2016	—	—	—	—	—	—	—	—	—	—		Nasty Dealer 2
"Leave Broke" (Famous Fresh featuring Chris Brown)	2016	—	—	—	—	—	—	—	—	—	—		Non-album single
"Do You Mind" (DJ Khaled featuring Nicki Minaj, Chris Brown, August Alsina, Jeremih, Future and Rick Ross)	2016	27	9	65	93	—	—	—	—	—	197	RIAA: 4× Platinum; ARIA: 2× Platinum; BPI: Silver; MC: Gold; RMNZ: 2× Platinum	Major Key
"Famous" (Ray J featuring Chris Brown)	2016	—	—	—	—	—	—	—	—	—	—		Smoke Cloud TMG & OHB and Burn My Name
"I Think of You" (Jeremih featuring Chris Brown and Big Sean)	2017	—	— (Note: "I Think of You" did not enter the Billboard Hot R&B/Hip-Hop Songs, but peaked at number 5 on the Bubbling Under R&B/Hip-Hop Singles chart, which acts as an extension to the Hot R&B/Hip-Hop Songs.)	—	—	—	—	—	— (Note: "I Think of You" did not enter the NZ Top 40 Singles Chart, but peaked at number 4 on the NZ Heatseeker Singles Chart.)	—	—		Non-album single
"Bruk Off Yuh Back" (Konshens featuring Chris Brown)	2017	—	—	—	—	—	—	—	—	—	—		It Feel Good
"Jiu Jitsu" (OneInThe4Rest featuring Chris Brown)	2017	—	— (Note: "Jiu Jitsu" did not enter the Billboard Hot R&B/Hip-Hop Songs, but peaked at number 12 on the Bubbling Under R&B/Hip-Hop Singles chart, which acts as an extension to the Hot R&B/Hip-Hop Songs.)	—	—	—	—	—	—	—	—		Non-album single
"Whatever You Need" (Meek Mill featuring Chris Brown and Ty Dolla $ign)	2017	51	20	—	—	—	—	—	— (Note: "Whatever You Need" did not enter the NZ Top 40 Singles Chart, but peaked at number 6 on the NZ Heatseeker Singles Chart.)	—	—	RIAA: Platinum; RMNZ: Platinum	Wins & Losses
"African Bad Gyal" (Wizkid featuring Chris Brown)	2017	—	—	—	—	—	—	—	—	—	144		Sounds from the Other Side
"Tone It Down" (Gucci Mane featuring Chris Brown)	2017	— (Note: "Tone It Down" did not enter the Billboard Hot 100, but peaked at number 16 on the Bubbling Under Hot 100 Singles chart.)	— (Note: "Tone It Down" did not enter the Billboard Hot R&B/Hip-Hop Songs, but peaked at number 2 on the Bubbling Under R&B/Hip-Hop Singles chart, which acts as an extension to the Hot R&B/Hip-Hop Songs.)	—	—	—	—	—	—	—	—	RIAA: Gold; RMNZ: Gold	Mr. Davis
"Pie" (Future featuring Chris Brown)	2017	— (Note: "Pie" did not enter the Billboard Hot 100, but peaked at number 2 on the Bubbling Under Hot 100 Singles chart.)	48	—	78	—	—	—	—	—	92	RIAA: Gold; MC: Gold; RMNZ: Platinum	Hndrxx
"Post & Delete" (Zoey Dollaz featuring Chris Brown)	2017	—	—	—	—	—	—	—	—	—	—		M'ap Boule
"Perfect" (Dave East featuring Chris Brown)	2017	—	—	—	—	—	—	—	—	—	—	RIAA: Gold	Paranoia: A True Story
"Always" (A1 featuring Chris Brown and Ty Dolla $ign)	2017	—	—	—	—	—	—	—	—	—	—		Non-album single
"Either Way" (K. Michelle featuring Chris Brown)	2017	—	—	—	—	—	—	—	—	—	—		Kimberly: The People I Used to Know
"Left, Right" (Casanova featuring Chris Brown and Fabolous)	2017	—	—	—	—	—	—	—	—	—	—		Commissary
"Melanin Magic" (Remy Ma featuring Chris Brown)	2018	—	—	—	—	—	—	—	—	—	—		Non-album singles
"Love You Better" (King Combs featuring Chris Brown)	2018	—	—	—	—	—	—	—	—	—	—		Non-album singles
"Freaky Friday" (Lil Dicky featuring Chris Brown)	2018	8	5	4	10	21	3	28	1	33	1	RIAA: 5× Platinum; ARIA: 3× Platinum; BPI: 2× Platinum; BVMI: Gold; MC: 3× Platinum; NVPI: Platinum; RMNZ: 4× Platinum	Non-album singles
"Date Night (Same Time)" (Kirko Bangz featuring Chris Brown)	2018	—	—	—	—	—	—	—	—	—	—		Non-album singles
"Attention" (Fat Joe and Dre featuring Chris Brown)	2018	—	—	—	—	—	—	—	—	—	—		Non-album singles
"Overdose" (Agnez Mo featuring Chris Brown)	2018	—	—	—	—	—	—	—	—	—	—		Non-album singles
"Fairytale" (with Skye)	2018	—	—	—	—	—	—	—	—	—	—		Non-album singles
"Buss It" (Sage the Gemini featuring Chris Brown)	2018	—	—	—	—	—	—	—	— (Note: "Buss It" did not enter the NZ Top 40 Singles Chart, but peaked at number 40 on the NZ Hot Singles Chart.)	—	—		Non-album singles
"Flight to Memphis" (Smooky MarGielaa featuring Chris Brown, Juicy J and A$AP Rocky)	2018	—	—	—	—	—	—	—	— (Note: "Flight to Memphis" did not enter the NZ Top 32 Singles Chart, but peaked at number 34 on the NZ Hot Singles Chart.)	—	—		Non-album singles
"Must Be" (Rockie Fresh featuring Chris Brown)	2019	—	—	—	—	—	—	—	—	—	—		Destination
"Chi Chi" (Trey Songz featuring Chris Brown)	2019	—	— (Note: "Chi Chi" did not enter the US Billboard Hot R&B/Hip-Hop Songs chart, but peaked at #17 on the Billboard Hot R&B chart.)	—	—	—	—	—	— (Note: "Chi Chi" did not enter the NZ Top 40 Singles Chart, but peaked at number 9 on the NZ Hot Singles Chart.)	—	—	RMNZ: Gold	Non-album single
"Type a Way" (Eric Bellinger featuring Chris Brown and OG Parker)	2019	—	—	—	—	—	—	—	— (Note: "Type a Way" did not enter the NZ Top 32 Singles Chart, but peaked at number 27 on the NZ Hot Singles Chart.)	—	—	RMNZ: Gold	The Rebirth 2
"Light It Up" (with Marshmello and Tyga)	2019	90	35	60	75	77	63	—	— (Note: "Light It Up" did not enter the NZ Top 40 Singles Chart, but peaked at number 4 on the NZ Hot Singles Chart.)	78	55	MC: Gold	Non-album singles
"Easy (Remix)" (DaniLeigh featuring Chris Brown)	2019	79	34	84	—	—	—	—	— (Note: "Easy (Remix)" did not enter the NZ Top 40 Singles Chart, but peaked at number 11 on the NZ Hot Singles Chart.)	—	—	RIAA: 4× Platinum	Non-album singles
"Haute" (Tyga featuring J Balvin and Chris Brown)	2019	— (Note: "Haute" did not enter the Billboard Hot 100, but peaked at number 1 on the Bubbling Under Hot 100 chart, which acts as an extension to the Hot 100.)	42	50	55	—	78	—	— (Note: "Haute" did not enter the NZ Top 40 Singles Chart, but peaked at number 6 on the NZ Hot Singles Chart.)	23	66		Legendary
"G Walk" (Lil Mosey featuring Chris Brown)	2019	—	—	—	—	—	—	—	— (Note: "G Walk" did not enter the NZ Top 40 Singles Chart, but peaked at number 24 on the NZ Hot Singles Chart.)	—	—	RIAA: Gold	Certified Hitmaker
"Restroom Occupied" (Yella Beezy featuring Chris Brown)	2019	— (Note: "Restroom Occupied" did not enter the Billboard Hot 100, but peaked at number 9 on the Bubbling Under Hot 100 chart, which acts as an extension to the Hot 100.)	— (Note: "Restroom Occupied" did not enter the Billboard Hot R&B/Hip-Hop Songs, but peaked at number 1 on the Bubbling Under R&B/Hip-Hop Singles chart, which acts as an extension to the Hot R&B/Hip-Hop Songs.)	—	—	—	—	—	—	—	—	RIAA: Gold	Baccend Beezy
"Blow My Mind" (with Davido)	2019	—	—	—	—	—	—	—	— (Note: "Blow My Mind" did not enter the NZ Top 40 Singles Chart, but peaked at number 27 on the NZ Hot Singles Chart.)	—	—	RIAA: Gold; MC: Gold	A Good Time
"Did You?" (4B featuring Chris Brown)	2019	— (Note: "Did You" did not enter the Billboard Hot 100, but peaked at number 36 on the Dance/Electronic Songs.)	—	—	—	—	—	—	— (Note: "Did You" did not enter the NZ Top 40 Singles Chart, but peaked at number 31 on the NZ Hot Singles Chart.)	—	—		Non-album singles
"Something Real" (with Summer Walker and London on da Track)	2019	— (Note: "Something Real" did not enter the Billboard Hot 100, but peaked at number 20 on the Bubbling Under Hot 100 chart, which acts as an extension to the Hot 100.)	— (Note: "Something Real" did not enter the Billboard Hot R&B/Hip-Hop Songs, but peaked at number 7 on the Bubbling Under R&B/Hip-Hop Singles chart, which acts as an extension to the Hot R&B/Hip-Hop Songs.)	—	—	—	—	—	— (Note: "Something Real" did not enter the NZ Top 40 Singles Chart, but peaked at number 17 on the NZ Hot Singles Chart.)	—	99	RIAA: Gold; RMNZ: Gold	Non-album singles
"Out of Your Mind" (French Montana and Swae Lee featuring Chris Brown)	2020	—	—	—	—	—	—	—	— (Note: "Out of Your Mind" did not enter the NZ Top 40 Singles Chart, but peaked at number 20 on the NZ Hot Singles Chart.)	—	—		Montana
"Wake Up Dead" (T-Pain featuring Chris Brown)	2020	—	—	—	—	—	—	—	— (Note: "Wake Up Dead" did not enter the NZ Top 40 Singles Chart, but peaked at number 28 on the NZ Hot Singles Chart.)	—	—		Non-album singles
"Put In Work" (Jacquees featuring Chris Brown)	2020	—	—	—	—	—	—	—	— (Note: "Put In Work" did not enter the NZ Top 40 Singles Chart, but peaked at number 16 on the NZ Hot Singles Chart.)	—	—	RIAA: Gold	Non-album singles
"Back to You" (O.T. Genasis featuring Chris Brown and Charlie Wilson)	2020	—	—	—	—	—	—	—	— (Note: "Back to You" did not enter the NZ Top 40 Singles Chart, but peaked at number 13 on the NZ Hot Singles Chart.)	—	—		Non-album singles
"Provide" (G-Eazy featuring Chris Brown and Mark Morrison)	2021	64	24	52	90	—	—	—	— (Note: "Provide" did not enter the NZ Top 40 Singles Chart, but peaked at number three on the NZ Hot Singles Chart.)	—	98	RIAA: Gold; RMNZ: Gold	These Things Happen Too
"Rolls Royce Umbrella" (Clever featuring Chris Brown)	2021	—	—	—	—	—	—	—	—	—	—		Crazy
"Guilty" (Sevyn Streeter featuring Chris Brown and A$AP Ferg)	2021	—	—	—	—	—	—	—	— (Note: "Guilty" did not enter the NZ Top 40 Singles Chart, but peaked at number eighteen on the NZ Hot Singles Chart.)	—	—		Drunken Wordz Sober Thoughtz
"Feels" (Tory Lanez featuring Chris Brown)	2021	—	—	—	—	—	—	—	— (Note: "Feels" did not enter the NZ Top 40 Singles Chart, but peaked at number twelve on the NZ Hot Singles Chart.)	—	—		Playboy
"Baby" (Sage the Gemini featuring Chris Brown)	2021	—	—	—	—	—	—	—	—	—	—		Non-album single
"Already Best Friends" (Jack Harlow featuring Chris Brown)	2021	— (Note: "Already Best Friends" did not enter the Billboard Hot 100, but peaked at number 19 on the Bubbling Under Hot 100 chart, which acts as an extension to the Hot 100.)	—	—	—	—	—	—	— (Note: "Already Best Friends" did not enter the NZ Top 40 Singles Chart, but peaked at number 16 on the NZ Hot Singles Chart.)	—	—	RIAA: Platinum; BPI: Silver; MC: Platinum; RMNZ: Platinum	Thats What They All Say
"Come Through" (H.E.R. featuring Chris Brown)	2021	64	23	96	91	—	—	— (Note: "Come Through" did not enter the Single Top 100, but peaked at number 8 on the Single Tip chart.)	— (Note: "Come Through" did not enter the NZ Top 40 Singles Chart, but peaked at number three on the NZ Hot Singles Chart.)	—	75	RIAA: Gold; RMNZ: Gold	Back of My Mind
"Rain Down" (with OG Parker and PnB Rock featuring Latto and Layton Greene)	2021	—	—	—	—	—	—	—	—	—	—		Moments
"Baddest" (Yung Bleu featuring Chris Brown and 2 Chainz)	2021	56	17	—	—	—	—	—	— (Note: "Baddest" did not enter the NZ Top 40 Singles Chart, but peaked at number 38 on the NZ Hot Singles Chart.)	—	—	RIAA: Gold; RMNZ: Gold	Moon Boy
"Angles" (Wale featuring Chris Brown)	2021	— (Note: "Angles" did not enter the Billboard Hot 100, but peaked at number 6 on the Bubbling Under Hot 100 Singles chart, which acts as an extension to the Hot 100.)	44	—	—	—	—	—	— (Note: "Angles" did not enter the NZ Top 40 Singles Chart, but peaked at number 10 on the NZ Hot Singles Chart.)	—	—		Folarin 2
"Woo Baby" (Pop Smoke featuring Chris Brown)	2021	64	22	24	31	—	—	58	22	41	54	BPI: Silver; RMNZ: Platinum	Faith
"Nostálgico" (with Rvssian and Rauw Alejandro)	2021	— (Note: "Nostálgico" did not enter the Billboard Hot 100, but peaked at number 23 on the Bubbling Under Hot 100 Singles chart, which acts as an extension to the Hot 100.)	—	—	—	—	—	— (Note: "Nostálgico" did not enter the Single Top 100, but peaked at number 21 on the Single Tip chart.)	— (Note: "Nostálgico" did not enter the NZ Top 40 Singles Chart, but peaked at number 34 on the NZ Hot Singles Chart.)	69	—	RIAA: 18× Platinum (Latin)	Non-album singles
"Get Back" (with Mario)	2021	—	—	—	—	—	—	—	— (Note: "Get Back" did not enter the NZ Top 40 Singles Chart, but peaked at number 11 on the NZ Hot Singles Chart.)	—	—		Non-album singles
"Goodbye" (with No Limit, Dadju and Skread)	2021	—	—	—	—	—	—	—	—	—	—		Non-album singles
"Monalisa (Remix)" (Lojay and Sarz featuring Chris Brown)	2022	—	—	—	—	—	—	— (Note: "Sensational" did not enter the Single Top 100, but peaked at number 4 on the Single Tip chart.)	— (Note: "Monalisa" did not enter the NZ Top 40 Singles Chart, but peaked at number 30 on the NZ Hot Singles Chart.)	—	99	BPI: Gold	Non-album singles
"Ocean Drive" (Sean Kingston featuring Chris Brown)	2022	—	—	—	—	—	—	—	—	—	—		Non-album singles
"Nasty" (Tyga featuring Chris Brown)	2022	—	—	—	—	—	—	—	— (Note: "Nasty" did not enter the NZ Top 40 Singles Chart, but peaked at number six on the NZ Hot Singles Chart.)	—	—		Non-album singles
"Do You Mind" (Vedo featuring Chris Brown)	2023	—	—	—	—	—	—	—	— (Note: "Do You Mind" did not enter the NZ Top 40 Singles Chart, but peaked at number seven on the NZ Hot Singles Chart.)	—	—		Mood Swings
"See Through Love" (Tank featuring Chris Brown)	2023	—	—	—	—	—	—	—	—	—	—		R&B Money
"How Does It Feel" (Chlöe featuring Chris Brown)	2023	— (Note: "How Does It Feel" did not enter the Billboard Hot 100, but peaked at number 10 on the Bubbling Under Hot 100 Singles chart, which acts as an extension to the Hot 100.)	47	—	—	—	—	—	— (Note: "How Does It Feel" did not enter the NZ Top 40 Singles Chart, but peaked at number five on the NZ Hot Singles Chart.)	—	—		In Pieces
"Don't Give It Away" (Fridayy featuring Chris Brown)	2023	—	—	—	—	—	—	—	— (Note: "Don't Give It Away" did not enter the NZ Top 40 Singles Chart, but peaked at number 11 on the NZ Hot Singles Chart.)	—	—		Fridayy
"How We Roll" (with Ciara)	2023	— (Note: "How We Roll" did not enter the Billboard Hot 100, but peaked at number 5 on the Bubbling Under Hot 100 Singles chart, which acts as an extension to the Hot 100.)	34	—	—	—	—	—	— (Note: "How We Roll" did not enter the NZ Top 40 Singles Chart, but peaked at number two on the NZ Hot Singles Chart.)	—	— (Note: "How We Roll" did not enter the UK Top 100 but debuted and peaked at number 21 on the UK Singles Downloads Chart on August 11, 2023.)	RIAA: Gold; RMNZ: Gold	CiCi
"IDGAF" (Tee Grizzley featuring Chris Brown and Mariah the Scientist)	2023	98	30	—	—	—	—	—	— (Note: "IDGAF" did not enter the NZ Top 40 Singles Chart, but peaked at number nine on the NZ Hot Singles Chart.)	—	—	RIAA: Gold; RMNZ: Gold	Tee's Coney Island
"FTCU" (SleezeMix) (Nicki Minaj featuring Travis Scott, Chris Brown and Sexyy Red)	2024	—	—	—	—	—	—	—	— (Note: "FTCU" (SleezeMix) did not enter the NZ Top 40 Singles Chart, but peaked at number 20 on the NZ Hot Singles Chart.)	—	—		Non-album single
"Wake Up" (Skylar Blatt featuring Chris Brown)	2024	—	—	—	—	—	—	—	— (Note: "Wake Up" did not enter the NZ Top 40 Singles Chart, but peaked at number six on the NZ Hot Singles Chart.)	—	—		TBA
"UnLonely" (J. Valentine featuring Chris Brown)	2024	—	—	—	—	—	—	—	— (Note: "UnLonely" did not enter the NZ Top 40 Singles Chart, but peaked at number 17 on the NZ Hot Singles Chart.)	—	—		TBA
"Wait on It" (Jeremih featuring Bryson Tiller and Chris Brown)	2024	—	48	—	—	—	—	—	— (Note: "Wait on It" did not enter the NZ Top 40 Singles Chart, but peaked at number four on the NZ Hot Singles Chart.)	—	—		TBA
"Lightning" (Kristii featuring Chris Brown and O.T. Genasis)	2024	—	—	—	—	—	—	—	—	—	—		TBA
"Mutt" (Remix) (with Leon Thomas)	2025	—	—	—	—	—	—	—	— (Note: "Mutt" (Remix) did not enter the NZ Top 40 Singles Chart, but peaked at number 1 on the NZ Hot Singles Chart.)	—	—		Mutt
"Use Me" (with Bow Wow)	2025	—	—	—	—	—	—	—	— (Note: "Use Me" did not enter the NZ Top 40 Singles Chart, but peaked at number 8 on the NZ Hot Singles Chart.)	—	—		TBA
"WGFT" (Remix) (Gunna featuring Chris Brown)	2026	—	—	—	—	—	—	—	— (Note: "WGFT" (Remix) did not enter the NZ Top 40 Singles Chart, but peaked at number 9 on the NZ Hot Singles Chart.)	—	—		TBA
"Face Card" (Skilla Baby featuring Chris Brown and Bryson Tiller)	2026	— (Note: "Face Card" did not enter the Billboard Hot 100, but peaked at number 1 on the Bubbling Under Hot 100 chart, which acts as an extension to the Hot 100.)	25	—	—	—	—	—	— (Note: "Face Card" did not enter the NZ Top 40 Singles Chart, but peaked at number 28 on the NZ Hot Singles Chart.)	—	—		The Price of Fame
"—" denotes a recording that did not chart or was not released in that territory.

=== Promotional singles ===
List of promotional singles, with selected chart positions and certifications, showing year released and album name
Title	Year	Peak chart positions										Certifications	Album
Title	Year	US	US R&B/ HH	AUS	CAN	FRA	GER	NZ	SWI	UK	UK R&B	Certifications	Album
"I May Never Find"	2006	—	—	—	—	—	—	—	—	—	—		Non-album single
"Dreamer"	2008	16	—	—	—	—	—	26	—	—	—		AT&T TEAM USA soundtrack
"Sing Like Me"	2009	—	84	—	—	—	—	—	—	—	—		Graffiti
"Long Gone" (Nelly featuring Plies and Chris Brown)	2010	—^{[L]}	—^{[L]}	—	—	—	—	—	—	—	—		5.0
"Why Stop Now" (Busta Rhymes featuring Chris Brown)	2011	—	79	—	—	—	—	—	—	—	—		Non-album single
"Oh Yeah" (featuring Snoop Dogg and 2 Chainz)	2012	—	—	—	—	—	—	—	—	—	—		Rarities & B-Sides and Fortune
"Calypso"	2012	—	—	—	—	—	—	—	—	—	—		Rarities & B-Sides and Fortune
"Get Down" (featuring T-Pain and B.o.B)	2012	—	—	—	—	—	—	—	—	—	—		Rarities & B-Sides and Fortune
"X"	2014	98	26	75	—	63	—	—	—	91	12		X
"Songs on 12 Play" (featuring Trey Songz)	2014	—^{[Z]}	48	—	—	—	—	—	—	194	33		X
"Remember Me" (with Tyga)	2015	—	—	—	—	—	—	—	—	—	—		Fan of a Fan: The Album
"Been Around the World" (August Alsina featuring Chris Brown)	2015	—	—	—	—	—	—	—	—	—	—		This Thing Called Life
"Wrist" (featuring Solo Lucci)	2015	—^{[X]}	46	—	—	—	—	—	—	—	—	RIAA: Gold; RMNZ: Gold	Royalty
"Anyway" (featuring Tayla Parx)	2015	—^{[W]}	—	—	—	—	—	—	—	—	—		Royalty
"Welcome to My Life" (featuring Cal Scruby)	2017	—	—	—	—	—	—	—	—	—	—		Welcome to My Life
"Hello Ego" (Jhené Aiko featuring Chris Brown)	2017	—	—	—	—	—	—	—	—	—	—		Trip
"High End" (featuring Future and Young Thug)	2017	82	32	—	57	93	—	— (Note: "High End" did not enter the NZ Top 40 Singles Chart, but peaked at number five on the NZ Heatseeker Singles Chart.)	78	71	33	RIAA: Gold	Heartbreak on a Full Moon
"Confidence"	2017	—	—	—	—	—	—	— (Note: "Confidence" did not enter the NZ Top 40 Singles Chart, but peaked at number five on the NZ Heatseeker Singles Chart.)	—	—	—		Heartbreak on a Full Moon
"Only 4 Me" (featuring Ty Dolla $ign and Verse Simmonds)	2017	—	—	—	—	—	—	—	—	—	—		Heartbreak on a Full Moon
"Everybody Knows"	2017	—	—	—	—	—	—	— (Note: "Everybody Knows" did not enter the NZ Top 40 Singles Chart, but peaked at number five on the NZ Heatseeker Singles Chart.)	—	—	—		Heartbreak on a Full Moon
"Hope You Do"	2017	—	—	—	—	—	—	—	—	—	—	RIAA: Platinum; RMNZ: Gold	Heartbreak on a Full Moon
"Pull Up"	2017	—	—	—	—	—	—	—	—	—	—		Heartbreak on a Full Moon
"Whatchamacallit" (Ella Mai featuring Chris Brown)	2018	— (Note: "Whatchamacallit" did not enter the Billboard Hot 100, but peaked at number 3 on the Bubbling Under Hot 100 Singles chart.)	—	66	—	—	—	21	—	84	—	RIAA: Platinum; ARIA: Platinum; BPI: Silver; MC: Gold; RMNZ: 2× Platinum	Ella Mai
"Just Let Go" (with Joyner Lucas)	2019	—	—	—	—	—	—	— (Note: "Just Let Go" did not enter the NZ Top 40 Singles Chart, but peaked at number 16 on the NZ Hot Singles Chart.)	—	—	—		Non-album single
"Don't Check on Me" (featuring Justin Bieber and Ink)	2019	67	—	20	48	—	93	13	48	29	15	RIAA: Gold; ARIA: Gold; BPI: Silver; MC: Gold; RMNZ: Platinum	Indigo
"Coming Home" (Casanova featuring Chris Brown)	2019	—	—	—	—	—	—	—	—	—	—		Behind These Scars
"Safety 2020" (GASHI featuring Chris Brown, Afro B and DJ Snake)	2020	— (Note: "Safety 2020" did not enter the Billboard Hot 100, but peaked at number 25 on the Dance/Electronic Songs.)	—	—	—	—	—	— (Note: "Safety 2020" did not enter the NZ Top 40 Singles Chart, but peaked at number 19 on the NZ Hot Singles Chart.)	—	—	—		Non-album single
"It's Giving Christmas"	2022	—	—	—	—	—	—	— (Note: "It's Giving Christmas" did not enter the NZ Top 40 Singles Chart, but peaked at number 24 on the NZ Hot Singles Chart.)	—	—	—		Breezy – It's Giving Christmas
"No Time Like Christmas"	2022	—	—	—	—	—	—	—	—	—	—		Breezy – It's Giving Christmas
"How We Roll" (Remix) (with Ciara and Lil Wayne)	2023	—	—	—	—	—	—	— (Note: "How We Roll (Remix) did not enter the NZ Top 40 Singles Chart, but peaked at number 17 on the NZ Hot Singles Chart.)	—	—	—		Non-album single
"—" denotes a recording that did not chart or was not released in that territory.

== Other charted and certified songs ==
List of songs, with selected chart positions and certifications, showing year released and album name
Title	Year	Peak chart positions										Certifications	Album
Title	Year	US	US R&B/ HH	AUS	CAN	FRA	GER	NZ	SWI	UK	UK R&B	Certifications	Album
"Ya Man Ain't Me"	2005	—	—^{[M]}	—	—	—	—	—	—	—	—	RIAA: Gold	Chris Brown
"Ain't No Way (You Won't Love Me)"	2005	—	—	—	—	—	—	—	—	—	—	RIAA: Gold; RMNZ: Gold	Chris Brown
"What's My Name" (featuring Noah)	2005	—	—	—	—	—	—	—	—	—	—	PMB: Platinum	Chris Brown
"Damage"	2007	—	—^{[N]}	—	—	—	—	—	—	—	—		Exclusive
"I Wanna Be"	2007	—	—	—	—	—	—	—	—	—	—	RIAA: Gold	Exclusive
"This Christmas"	2007	62	27	—	—	—	—	—	—	—	32	RIAA: Platinum	This Christmas soundtrack
"Bad Girl" (Rihanna featuring Chris Brown)	2009	—	55	—	—	—	—	—	—	—	—		Non-album singles
"Better on the Other Side" (with The Game, Diddy, DJ Khalil, Polow da Don, Mario Winans, Usher and Boyz II Men)	2009	—	—^{[O]}	—	—	—	—	—	—	—	—		Non-album singles
"Changed Man"	2009	—	64	—	—	—	—	—	—	—	—		Non-album singles
"Turntables" (Ciara featuring Chris Brown)	2009	—	—	—	—	—	—	—	—	80	22		Fantasy Ride
"What I Do" (featuring Plies)	2009	88	—	—	—	—	—	—	—	—	—		Graffiti
"Brown Skin Girl" (featuring Sean Paul)	2009	—	—	—	—	—	—	—	—	—	—	RMNZ: Gold	Graffiti
"Another Planet" (Jawan Harris featuring Chris Brown)	2010	—	—^{[P]}	—	—	—	—	—	—	—	—		Non-album single
"Oh Yea" (Plies and DJ Scream featuring Chris Brown)	2011	—	—^{[Q]}	—	—	—	—	—	—	—	—		No Chaser
"Should've Kissed You"	2011	—	—	—	—	—	—	—	—	—	—	RIAA: Gold	F.A.M.E.
"Paper, Scissors, Rock" (featuring Timbaland and Big Sean)	2011	—	—^{[R]}	—	—	—	—	—	—	—	—		F.A.M.E.
"Beg for It"	2011	—	—	—	—	—	—	—	—	—	—	RIAA: Gold	F.A.M.E.
"Marvins Room" (Remix) (featuring J. Valentine, Dawn Richard, Se7en and Kevin McCall)	2011	—	77	—	—	—	—	—	—	—	—		Boy in Detention
"Undercover" (DJ Drama featuring Chris Brown and J. Cole)	2011	—	—^{[S]}	—	—	—	—	—	—	—	—		Third Power
"Look at Her Go" (T-Pain featuring Chris Brown)	2011	—^{[T]}	—	—	—	—	—	—	—	—	—		Revolver
"Arena" (B.o.B featuring Chris Brown and T.I.)	2012	—^{[U]}	—	36	—	—	—	—	—	—	—		Strange Clouds
"Bassline"	2012	—	—	—	—	—	—	—	—	122	28		Fortune
"2012"	2012	—	— (Note: "2012" did not enter the Billboard Hot R&B/Hip-Hop Songs, but peaked at number 25 on the Hot R&B Songs chart)	—	—	—	—	—	—	—	—	RIAA: Gold	Fortune
"Marry Go Round" (Nelly featuring Chris Brown)	2012	—	—^{[V]}	—	—	—	—	—	—	—	—		Non-album single
"Nobody's Business" (Rihanna featuring Chris Brown)	2012	—	39	—	—	36	—	—	—	63	7	ARIA: Platinum; BPI: Silver; RMNZ: Platinum	Unapologetic
"Let's Go" (will.i.am featuring Chris Brown)	2013	— (Note: "Let's Go" did not enter the Billboard Hot 100, but peaked at number 38 on the Dance/Electronic Songs.)	—	—	—	—	—	—	—	—	—		#willpower
"I'm Still" (DJ Khaled featuring Chris Brown, Wale, Wiz Khalifa and Ace Hood)	2013	—	— (Note: "I'm Still" did not enter the Hot R&B/Hip-Hop Songs chart, but peaked at number four on the Bubbling Under R&B/Hip-Hop Singles chart.)	—	—	—	—	—	—	—	—		Suffering from Success
"Came to Do" (featuring Akon)	2014	—	52	—	—	174	—	—	—	105	14	RMNZ: Platinum	X
"Autumn Leaves" (featuring Kendrick Lamar)	2014	—^{[Z]}	36	—	—	—	—	—	—	143	24	RIAA: Gold; RMNZ: Gold	X
"Drunk Texting" (featuring Jhené Aiko)	2014	—^{[Z]}	46	—	—	—	—	—	—	128	19	RIAA: Platinum; RMNZ: Gold	X
"Girl You Loud" (with Tyga)	2015	—	—	—	—	—	—	—	—	—	—	BPI: Silver; RMNZ: Platinum	Fan of a Fan: The Album
"Here It Is" (Flo Rida featuring Chris Brown)	2015	— (Note: "Here It Is" did not enter the Billboard Hot 100, but peaked at number 22 on the Dance/Electronic Songs.)	—	—	—	—	94	—	50	—	26		My House
"Gangsta Way" (French Montana featuring Chris Brown)	2015	—	—	—	—	—	—	—	—	—	—	RMNZ: Gold	Coke Zoo
"Simple Things" (Remix) (Miguel featuring Chris Brown and Future)	2015	—	— (Note: "Simple Things" did not enter the Hot R&B/Hip-Hop Songs chart, but peaked at number five on the Bubbling Under R&B/Hip-Hop Singles chart.)	—	—	—	—	—	—	—	—	RIAA: Platinum; ARIA: Gold; MC: Gold; RMNZ: Gold	Non-album single
"Make Love"	2015	—	—	—	—	—	—	—	—	—	40	RMNZ: Gold	Royalty
"Picture Me Rollin'"	2015	—	50	—	—	—	—	—	—	—	25	RMNZ: Gold	Royalty
"Who's Gonna (Nobody)"	2015	—	—	—	—	—	—	—	—	—	—	RIAA: Gold	Royalty
"Little More (Royalty)"	2015	91	32	—	98	—	—	—	—	—	29	RIAA: Gold	Royalty
"Waves" (Kanye West featuring Chris Brown)	2016	71	24	—	86	—	—	— (Note: "Waves" did not enter the NZ Top 40 Singles Chart, but peaked at number nine on the NZ Heatseeker Singles Chart.)	—	77	20	RIAA: 3× Platinum; BPI: Gold; RMNZ: Platinum	The Life of Pablo
"Fucking & Kissing" (A Boogie wit da Hoodie featuring Chris Brown)	2017	—	— (Note: "Fucking & Kissing" did not enter the Billboard Hot R&B/Hip-Hop Songs, but peaked at number 10 on the Bubbling Under R&B/Hip-Hop Singles chart, which acts as an extension to the Hot R&B/Hip-Hop Songs.)	—	—	—	—	—	—	—	—	RIAA: Gold	The Bigger Artist
"Lost & Found"	2017	—	— (Note: "Lost & Found" did not enter the Billboard Hot R&B/Hip-Hop Songs, but peaked at number two on the Bubbling Under R&B/Hip-Hop Singles chart.)	—	—	—	—	—	—	—	—		Heartbreak on a Full Moon
"Juicy Booty" (featuring Jhené Aiko and R. Kelly)	2017	—	— (Note: "Juicy Booty" did not enter the Billboard Hot R&B/Hip-Hop Songs, but peaked at number 5 on the Bubbling Under R&B/Hip-Hop Singles chart, which acts as an extension to the Hot R&B/Hip-Hop Songs.)	—	—	—	—	—	—	—	—	RIAA: Gold; RMNZ: Gold	Heartbreak on a Full Moon
"To My Bed"	2017	—	—	—	—	—	—	—	—	—	—	RIAA: Platinum	Heartbreak on a Full Moon
"Jealous" (DJ Khaled featuring Chris Brown, Lil Wayne and Big Sean)	2019	57	26	59	54	167	—	— (Note: "Jealous" did not enter the NZ Top 40 Singles Chart, but peaked at number 8 on the NZ Hot Singles Chart.)	80	37	17	RIAA: Gold; ARIA: Gold; RMNZ: Gold	Father of Asahd
"Indigo"	2019	— (Note: "Indigo" did not enter the Billboard Hot 100, but peaked at number 10 on the Bubbling Under Hot 100 chart, which acts as an extension to the Hot 100.)	48	—	—	—	—	— (Note: "Indigo" did not enter the NZ Top 40 Singles Chart, but peaked at number seven on the NZ Hot Singles Chart.)	—	—	—	RIAA: Platinum; RMNZ: Gold	Indigo
"Come Together" (featuring H.E.R.)	2019	—	— (Note: "Come Together" did not enter the Billboard Hot R&B/Hip-Hop Songs, but peaked at number 1 on the Bubbling Under R&B/Hip-Hop Singles chart, which acts as an extension to the Hot R&B/Hip-Hop Songs.)	—	—	—	—	— (Note: "Come Together" did not enter the NZ Top 40 Singles Chart, but peaked at number six on the NZ Hot Singles Chart.)	—	—	—	RIAA: Gold; RMNZ: Gold	Indigo
"Girl of My Dreams"	2019	—	—	—	—	—	—	— (Note: "Girl of My Dreams" did not enter the NZ Top 40 Singles Chart, but peaked at number 13 on the NZ Hot Singles Chart.)	—	—	—		Indigo
"Overtime"	2019	—	—	—	—	—	—	— (Note: "Overtime" did not enter the NZ Top 40 Singles Chart, but peaked at number 16 on the NZ Hot Singles Chart.)	—	—	—	RMNZ: Gold	Indigo
"The Take" (Tory Lanez featuring Chris Brown)	2019	66	32	73	68	—	—	— (Note: "The Take" did not enter the NZ Top 40 Singles Chart, but peaked at number 13 on the NZ Hot Singles Chart.)	—	35	—	RIAA: Platinum; ARIA: Gold; BPI: Gold; RMNZ: Gold	Chixtape 5
"Slide (Remix)" (H.E.R. featuring Pop Smoke, A Boogie wit da Hoodie and Chris Brown)	2020	—	—	—	—	—	—	— (Note: "Slide (Remix)" did not enter the NZ Top 40 Singles Chart, but peaked at number 32 on the NZ Hot Singles Chart.)	—	—	—	BPI: Silver	Non-album single
"Not You Too" (Drake featuring Chris Brown)	2020	25	14	—	29	97	—	— (Note: "Not You Too" did not enter the NZ Top 40 Singles Chart, but peaked at number six on the NZ Hot Singles Chart.)	—	—	—	ARIA: Gold; BPI: Gold; RMNZ: Platinum	Dark Lane Demo Tapes
"City Girls" (with Young Thug)	2020	—	—	—	—	—	—	— (Note: "City Girls" did not enter the NZ Top 40 Singles Chart, but peaked at number 31 on the NZ Hot Singles Chart.)	—	—	—	RIAA: Gold; RMNZ: Platinum	Slime & B
"Go Crazy (Remix)" (with Young Thug featuring Future, Lil Durk and Mulatto)	2021	—	—	—	—	—	—	— (Note: "Go Crazy (Remix)" did not enter the NZ Top 40 Singles Chart, but peaked at number 27 on the NZ Hot Singles Chart.)	—	—	—		Non-album single
"New Again" (Kanye West featuring Chris Brown)	2021	68	32	46	57	—	—	—	—	—	21		Donda
"Die Alone" (with Gunna featuring Yung Bleu)	2022	92	38	—	—	—	—	—	—	—	—		DS4Ever
"Till the Wheels Fall Off" (featuring Lil Durk and Capella Grey)	2022	— (Note: "Till the Wheels Fall Off" did not enter the Billboard Hot 100, but peaked at number 4 on the Bubbling Under Hot 100 Singles chart, which acts as an extension to the Hot 100.)	36	—	—	—	—	— (Note: "Till the Wheels Fall Off" did not enter the NZ Top 40 Singles Chart, but peaked at number eight on the NZ Hot Singles Chart.)	—	66	23		Breezy
"C.A.B. (Catch a Body)" (featuring Fivio Foreign)	2022	— (Note: "C.A.B. (Catch a Body)" did not enter the Billboard Hot 100, but peaked at number 3 on the Bubbling Under Hot 100 Singles chart, which acts as an extension to the Hot 100.)	35	—	—	—	—	—	—	—	—		Breezy
"Possessive" (featuring Lil Wayne and Yung Bleu)	2022	98	31	—	—	—	—	—	—	—	—		Breezy
"Addicted" (featuring Lil Baby)	2022	92	28	—	—	—	—	—	—	—	—		Breezy
"Closure" (featuring H.E.R.)	2022	— (Note: "Closure" did not enter the Billboard Hot 100, but peaked at number 24 on the Bubbling Under Hot 100 Singles chart, which acts as an extension to the Hot 100.)	—	—	—	—	—	—	—	—	—		Breezy
"Sex Memories" (featuring Ella Mai)	2022	— (Note: "Sex Memories" did not enter the Billboard Hot 100, but peaked at number 25 on the Bubbling Under Hot 100 Singles chart, which acts as an extension to the Hot 100.)	—	—	—	—	—	— (Note: "Sex Memories" did not enter the NZ Top 40 Singles Chart, but peaked at number 11 on the NZ Hot Singles Chart.)	—	—	—		Breezy
"Psychic" (featuring Jack Harlow)	2022	78	21	52	85	—	—	— (Note: "Psychic" did not enter the NZ Top 40 Singles Chart, but peaked at number four on the NZ Hot Singles Chart.)	—	64	21	RMNZ: Gold	Breezy
"Show It" (featuring Blxst)	2022	—	—	—	—	—	—	— (Note: "Show It" did not enter the NZ Top 40 Singles Chart, but peaked at number nine on the NZ Hot Singles Chart.)	—	—	—		Breezy
"Petty"	2022	—	—	—	—	—	—	— (Note: "Petty" did not enter the NZ Top 40 Singles Chart, but peaked at number 32 on the NZ Hot Singles Chart.)	—	—	—		Breezy
"Superhero (Heroes & Villains)" (with Metro Boomin and Future)	2022	8	2	30	7	94	75	29	23	34	8	RIAA: 4× Platinum; ARIA: 3× Platinum; BPI: Gold; MC: 2× Platinum; RMNZ: Platinum; SNEP: Gold	Heroes & Villains
"Angel Numbers / Ten Toes"	2023	— (Note: "Angel Numbers / Ten Toes" did not enter the Billboard Hot 100, but peaked at number 7 on the Bubbling Under Hot 100 Singles chart, which acts as an extension to the Hot 100.)	33	—	—	154	33	— (Note: "Angel Numbers / Ten Toes" did not enter the NZ Top 40 Singles Chart, but peaked at number three on the NZ Hot Singles Chart.)	5	31	8	RIAA: Gold; BPI: Gold; IFPI SWI: Gold; MC: Gold; RMNZ: Platinum; SNEP: Gold	11:11
"Press Me"	2023	—	48	—	—	—	—	— (Note: "Press Me" did not enter the NZ Top 40 Singles Chart, but peaked at number seven on the NZ Hot Singles Chart.)	—	—	—		11:11
"That's On You" (featuring Future)	2023	— (Note: "That's On You" did not enter the Billboard Hot 100, but peaked at number 18 on the Bubbling Under Hot 100 Singles chart, which acts as an extension to the Hot 100.)	37	—	—	—	—	—	—	—	—		11:11
"No One Else" (featuring Fridayy)	2023	—	43	—	—	—	—	— (Note: "No One Else" did not enter the NZ Top 40 Singles Chart, but peaked at number 12 on the NZ Hot Singles Chart.)	—	—	—		11:11
"Beg Forgiveness" (Kanye West and Ty Dolla $ign as ¥$ featuring Chris Brown)	2024	65	30	93	54	—	—	—	—	—	—		Vultures 1
"Bruce Lee"	2024	—	—	—	—	—	—	— (Note: "Bruce Lee" did not enter the NZ Top 40 Singles Chart, but peaked at number 25 on the NZ Hot Singles Chart.)	—	—	—		11:11
"Run Away" (featuring Bryson Tiller)	2024	—	—	—	—	—	—	— (Note: "Run Away" did not enter the NZ Top 40 Singles Chart, but peaked at number 32 on the NZ Hot Singles Chart.)	—	—	—		11:11
"Delusional"	2024	—	—	—	—	—	—	— (Note: "Delusional" did not enter the NZ Top 40 Singles Chart, but peaked at number 37 on the NZ Hot Singles Chart.)	—	—	—		11:11
"Drink n Dance" (with Future and Metro Boomin)	2024	51	19	—	67	—	—	—	—	—	—		We Still Don't Trust You
"One Call Away" (Fridayy featuring Chris Brown)	2025	—	—	—	—	—	—	— (Note: "One Call Away" did not enter the NZ Top 40 Singles Chart, but peaked at number 5 on the NZ Hot Singles Chart.)	—	—	—		Some Days I'm Good, Some Days I'm Not
"Titanium" (Davido featuring Chris Brown)	2025	—	—	—	—	—	—	— (Note: "Titanium" did not enter the NZ Top 40 Singles Chart, but peaked at number 16 on the NZ Hot Singles Chart.)	—	—	—		5ive
"It Depends" (The Remix) (Chris Brown featuring Bryson Tiller and Usher)	2025	—	—	—	—	—	—	— (Note: "It Depends (The Remix)" did not enter the NZ Top 40 Singles Chart, but peaked at number 10 on the NZ Hot Singles Chart.)	—	—	—		Non-album single
"Baby" (with Summer Walker)	2025	68	15	—	—	—	—	— (Note: "Baby" did not enter the NZ Top 40 Singles Chart, but peaked at number 11 on the NZ Hot Singles Chart.)	—	—	—		Finally Over It
"Leave Me Alone"	2026	— (Note: "Leave Me Alone" did not enter the Billboard Hot 100, but peaked at number 1 on the Bubbling Under Hot 100 chart, which acts as an extension to the Hot 100.)	33	—	—	—	—	— (Note: "Leave Me Alone" did not enter the NZ Top 40 Singles Chart, but peaked at number 3 on the NZ Hot Singles Chart.)	—	—	—		Brown
"Honey Pack"	2026	92	30	—	—	—	—	— (Note: "Honey Pack" did not enter the NZ Top 40 Singles Chart, but peaked at number 5 on the NZ Hot Singles Chart.)	—	—	—		Brown
"Hate Me"	2026	—	49	—	—	—	—	—	—	—			Brown
"Call Your Name" (featuring Sexyy Red and GloRilla)	2026	— (Note: "Call Your Name" did not enter the Billboard Hot 100, but peaked at number 2 on the Bubbling Under Hot 100 chart, which acts as an extension to the Hot 100.)	34	—	—	—	—	—	—	—	—		Brown
"For the Moment"	2026	85	28	—	—	—	—	— (Note: "For the Moment" did not enter the NZ Top 40 Singles Chart, but peaked at number 2 on the NZ Hot Singles Chart.)	—	—	—		Brown
"Fuck and Party" (featuring Vybz Kartel)	2026	— (Note: "Fuck and Party" did not enter the Billboard Hot 100, but peaked at number 23 on the Bubbling Under Hot 100 chart, which acts as an extension to the Hot 100.)	39	—	—	—	—	—	—	—	—		Brown
"Red Rum" (featuring YoungBoy Never Broke Again)	2026	— (Note: "Red Rum" did not enter the Billboard Hot 100, but peaked at number 13 on the Bubbling Under Hot 100 chart, which acts as an extension to the Hot 100.)	35	—	—	—	—	—	—	—	—		Brown
"It's Not You It's Me"	2026	—	44	—	—	—	—	— (Note: "It's Not You It's Me" did not enter the NZ Top 40 Singles Chart, but peaked at number 6 on the NZ Hot Singles Chart.)	—	—	—		Brown
"Slow Jamz" (featuring Lucky Daye)	2026	— (Note: "Slow Jamz" did not enter the Billboard Hot 100, but peaked at number 17 on the Bubbling Under Hot 100 chart, which acts as an extension to the Hot 100.)	36	—	—	—	—	—	—	—	—		Brown
"Perfect Timing" (featuring Fridayy)	2026	—	43	—	—	—	—	—	—	—	—		Brown
"Man on a Mission" (featuring Wizkid)	2026	—	—	—	—	—	—	— (Note: "Man on a Mission" did not enter the NZ Top 40 Singles Chart, but peaked at number 1 on the NZ Hot Singles Chart.)	—	—	—		Brown
"Just the Bro" (featuring Tyga and Ty Dolla $ign)	2026	—	—	—	—	—	—	— (Note: "Just the Bro" did not enter the NZ Top 40 Singles Chart, but peaked at number 5 on the NZ Hot Singles Chart.)	—	—	—		Brown
"Nthn2tlkbout"	2026	—	—	—	—	—	—	— (Note: "Nthn2tlkbout" did not enter the NZ Top 40 Singles Chart, but peaked at number 9 on the NZ Hot Singles Chart.)	—	—	—		Brown
"4Ever"	2026	—	—	—	—	—	—	— (Note: "4Ever" did not enter the NZ Top 40 Singles Chart, but peaked at number 12 on the NZ Hot Singles Chart.)	—	—	—		Brown
"—" denotes a recording that did not chart or was not released in that territory.

== Guest appearances ==
List of non-single guest appearances, with other performing artists, showing year released and album name
Title	Year	Other artist(s)	Album
"Which One"	2005	Noah	In the Mix soundtrack
"Umbrella" (Remix)	2007	Rihanna, Jay-Z	None
"Try a Little Tenderness"	2007	None	This Christmas soundtrack
"Leaving With Me"	2009	T.I.	A Year and a Day
"Ransom"	2009	Rock City	P.T.F.A.O: The Saga Continues
"I'm Illy"	2009	Teyana Taylor	From a Planet Called Harlem
"Smile & Wave"	2009	RichGirl	Fall in Love with RichGirl
"Choose Me"	2009	Yung Joc, Pleasure P	The Grind Flu
"The One I Love (Maniac)"	2009	Timbaland, Keri Hilson, D.O.E.	None
"How Low" (Remix)	2010	Ludacris, Ciara	None
"Drop It Low" (Remix)	2010	Ester Dean, Lil Wayne, Trey Songz, Diddy	None
"Pretty Girls" (Remix)	2010	Wale, Fabolous	None
"Big Things"	2010	Ester Dean	None
"Call Me Dougie"	2010	New Boyz	None
"Put You On"	2010	Diggy Simmons	Airborne
"Wonder Woman"	2010	Tyga	Well Done
"Green Goblin"	2010	Jae Millz	Dead Presidents
"Foreplay"	2010	Tank	Now or Never
"Yesterday"	2010	Diddy – Dirty Money	Last Train to Paris
"I Know"	2010	Diddy – Dirty Money, Wiz Khalifa, Sevyn Streeter	Last Train to Paris
"Don't Play Wit It"	2011	Lonny Bereal, Busta Rhymes	None
"Champion" (Remix)	2011	Chipmunk, J. Cole	None
"Up" (Remix)	2011	Justin Bieber	Never Say Never: The Remixes
"360"	2011	Kevin McCall, Tyga	Un-Invited Guest
"Big Booty Judy" (Remix)	2011	Kevin McCall, Ludacris	Un-Invited Guest
"Freaky I'm Iz"	2011	Kevin McCall, Swizz Beatz, Diesel	Un-Invited Guest and Boy in Detention
"Rest of My Life"	2011	Kevin McCall	Un-Invited Guest
"Hell Yeah"	2011	YG, Tyga	Just Re'd Up
"Love"	2011	JoJo Pellegrino	None
"Only One"	2011	The Game, Sevyn Streeter	Unreleased R.E.D.
"Take It Down Low"	2011	Akon	None
"For You"	2011	RichGirl	None
"Celebration" (Remix)	2011	Tank, Trey Songz	None
"100%"	2011	Kid Ink, Kevin McCall	None
"Luv Me Girl"	2011	Lloyd, Veronica Vega	King of Hearts
"Jada Fire"	2011	Kevin McCall, Diesel, Sammie	None
"Snapbacks Back"	2011	Tyga	Well Done 2 and Boy in Detention
"Westside"	2011	Jay Rock	Follow Me Home
"Up!" (R&B Remix)	2011	J. Valentine, Pleasure P	None
"Hard to Get"	2011	Kevin McCall	The Eargazm
"Favor" (Remix)	2011	Lonny Bereal, Kelly Rowland	None
"Body 2 Body" (Remix)	2011	Ace Hood, Rick Ross, Wale	The Statement 2
"Yao Ming" (Remix)	2012	David Banner, A$AP Rocky	Sex, Drugs & Video Games
"Bed Bath & Beyond"	2012	J. Valentine	Love & Other Drugs
"Why Stop Now" (Remix)	2012	Busta Rhymes, Missy Elliott, Lil Wayne	None
"For the Fame"	2012	Tyga, Wynter Gordon	Careless World: Rise of the Last King
"International (Serious)"	2012	Estelle, Trey Songz	All of Me
"Another Round" (Remix)	2012	Fat Joe, Mary J. Blige, Fabolous, Kirko Bangz	None
"Lonely"	2012	Tank	This Is How I Feel
"That Pole" (Remix)	2012	Kirko Bangz	Procrastination Kills 4
"Function" (Remix)	2012	E-40, Young Jeezy, French Montana, Red Café, Problem	None
"Cyeah Cyeah Cyeah Cyeah"	2012	Gucci Mane, Lil Wayne	I'm Up
"Time of Your Life" (Remix)	2012	Kid Ink, Tyga	None
"What's Gucci"	2012	D&D, Kevin McCall	Unforgettable
"100 Bottles"	2012	CyHi The Prynce, Big Sean	Ivy League Club
"Countdown"	2012	2 Chainz	Based on a T.R.U. Story
"Sellin' Dreams"	2012	Big Sean	Detroit
"Shut Up"	2012	Berner, Problem	Urban Farmer
"Flowerz"	2012	Lil Twist, Lil Wayne	None
"Hope We Meet Again"	2012	Pitbull	Global Warming
"Jumping Out the Plane"	2013	Luvaboy TJ	None
"That Nigga"	2013	Kid Red	REDemption
"I See Red"	2013	Kid Red	REDemption
"R.I.P." (Remix)	2013	Young Jeezy, YG, Kendrick Lamar	None
"Let the Blunt Go"	2013	Funkmaster Flex, Problem	Who You Mad At? Me or Yourself?
"Remedy"	2013	Snoop Lion, Busta Rhymes	Reincarnated
"Echo"	2013	Jazz Lazer, Tyga	Heaven or Las Vegas
"Dancin Dirty"	2013	Ludacris	#IDGAF
"Mad Fo"	2013	Ludacris, Meek Mill, Swizz Beatz, Pusha T	#IDGAF
"Lay Your Head Back"	2013	Problem, Tank, Terrace Martin	The Separation
"Like Whaaat" (Remix)	2013	Problem, Wiz Khalifa, Tyga, Master P	Famous Again
"Actin Up"	2013	Asher Roth, Rye Rye, Justin Bieber	The Greenhouse Effect Vol. 2
"Got My Heart"	2013	Ty Dolla $ign, The Game	Beach House 2
"Bigger Than Life"	2013	Birdman, Tyga, Lil Wayne	Rich Gang
"Won't Turn It Down"	2013	Jacquees	19
"I Don't Care"	2013	Lil Twist	None
"I Luv This Shit" (Remix)	2013	August Alsina, Trey Songz	Testimony
"F.I.V.E."	2013	The Game, Lil Wayne	OKE: Operation Kill Everything
"Throwback"	2013	B.o.B	Underground Luxury
"When to Stop"	2013	Tyga	Well Done 4
"Show Me" (Remix)	2014	Kid Ink, Trey Songz, Juicy J, 2 Chainz	None
"Control"	2014	Wisin, Pitbull	El Regreso del Sobreviviente
"Main Chick" (Remix)	2014	Kid Ink, French Montana, Yo Gotti, Tyga, Lil Bibby	None
"Hot Nigga" (Remix)	2014	Bobby Shmurda, Fabolous, Jadakiss, Rowdy Rebel, Busta Rhymes, Yo Gotti	None
"24 Hours" (Remix)	2014	Trey Songz	TRGAxBRZY
"Made Me" (Remix)	2014	Trey Songz	TRGAxBRZY
"Studio" (Remix)	2014	Trey Songz	TRGAxBRZY
"Tuesday" (Remix)	2014	Trey Songz	TRGAxBRZY
"Fuck Yo Feelings"	2014	The Game, Lil Wayne	Blood Moon: Year of the Wolf
"Don't Panic" (Remix)	2014	French Montana, Jeremih	None
"Nigga Like Me"	2014	Siya, Problem	Better Late Than Never
"Waves (Robin Schulz Remix)"	2014	Mr Probz, T.I.	None
"Dangerous Part II"	2014	David Guetta, Sam Martin, Trey Songz	None
"Blue Lipstick"	2014	TeeFlii	Starr
"CoCo (Part 3)"	2015	O.T. Genasis	None
"Get That Money"	2015	Lil Durk, French Montana	None
"Lil Bit" (Remix)	2015	K Camp, T.I.	None
"Post to Be" (Remix)	2015	Omarion, Jhené Aiko, Dej Loaf, Trey Songz, Rick Ross	None
"She Don't Love Me"	2015	Lil Boosie	Touch Down 2 Cause Hell
"Just for Tonight"	2015	Migos	Yung Rich Nation
"Body on Me" (Remix)	2015	Rita Ora, Fetty Wap	None
"Antidote" (Remix)	2015	French Montana	None
"Ain't Shit Change"	2015	Cal Scruby	House In the Hills
"Thuggin It"	2015	Joe Moses	From Nothing 2 Something 3
"Diamonds & Gold" (Remix)	2015	Kid Ink, French Montana, Verse Simmonds	None
"Faded to Sade"	2015	Lyrica Anderson	Hello
"36 Oz" (Remix)	2015	Skeme	Ingleworld 3
"Till the Morning"	2015	DJ Carisma, Dej Loaf	None
"Poppin'" (Remix)	2015	Rico Richie, Meek Mill, French Montana	Realest Story Ever Told, Vol. 2
"She Wildin'"	2015	Fabolous	The Young OG Project
"Rumorz"	2016	Tyga	Rawwest Nigga Alive and Before the Trap: Nights in Tarzana
"All I Need"	2016	J.U.S.T.I.C.E. League, Wale	J.U.S.T.I.C.E. for All and Before the Party
"Leave the Club"	2016	J.U.S.T.I.C.E. League, Joelle James	J.U.S.T.I.C.E. for All and Boy in Detention
"Wave Gods Intro"	2016	French Montana	Wave Gods
"Phone Call with Breezy (Skit)"	2016	A$AP Ferg	Always Strive and Prosper
"I Love You"	2016	A$AP Ferg, Ty Dolla $ign	Always Strive and Prosper
"One on One"	2016	Casey Veggies	Customized Greatly Vol. 4: The Return of The Boy
"Shabba"	2016	Wizkid, Trey Songz, French Montana	None
"Your Number (Remix)"	2016	Ayo Jay, Kid Ink	None
"Let Me Love You"	2016	The Rej3ctz	HOMELESS BILLIONAIRES
"Wishing" (Remix)	2016	DJ Drama, Fabolous, Trey Songz, Tory Lanez, Jhené Aiko	None
"Trapping Out the Garage"	2016	Young Lo, Flawkoe	None
"Scream"	2016	Kevin "Chocolate Droppa" Hart, Joelle James	Kevin Hart: What Now? (The Mixtape Presents Chocolate Droppa)
"Pretty Diamonds"	2016	Jeezy	Trap or Die 3
"Keep You In Mind" (Remix)	2016	Guordan Banks	None
"Moon Walk"	2016	Gucci Mane, Akon	None
"Cherry Red Vans"	2016	Ray J, Luvaboy TJ	Smoke Cloud TMG & OHB and Burn My Name
"Hold Up"	2017	French Montana, Migos	None
"Just As I Am"	2017	Spiff TV, Prince Royce	Five
"OHB"	2017	Casanova, Young Lo	Be Safe Tho
"Flexing"	2017	HoodyBaby, Lil Wayne, Quavo, Gudda Gudda	Kitchen 24: Slangin Off Key
"I See You"	2017	Kap G	SupaJefe
"Draco (Freestyle)"	2017	RRose RRome, Young Lo, Young Blacc, HoodyBaby	None
"Heaven on Earth"	2017	Wale	Shine
"Faded to Sade" (Remix)	2017	Lyrica Anderson	Nasha Pearl and Before the Trap: Nights in Tarzana
"Leanin'"	2017	Juicy J, Quavo	Gas Face
"All Me"	2017	Lyrica Anderson	Adia
"Right Now"	2017	Ai	Wa to Yo and Before the Party
"Fuck Them Hoes"	2017	Ray J, Jacquees	Burn My Name
"Already Love Her"	2017	Ray J	Burn My Name and Attack the Block
"Come Back"	2017	Ray J	Burn My Name
"Side Bitch"	2017	Ray J	Burn My Name
"New Gang"	2017	Ray J, Luvaboy TJ, Truth KO	Burn My Name and Attack the Block
"Burn My Name"	2017	Ray J, Bizzy Bone	Burn My Name
"Who You Came With"	2017	Luvaboy TJ, Ray J	Machine Lyfe FNFL.2
"Flipmode" (Remix)	2017	Velous, Fabolous	None
"Keep It 100"	2017	Kid Red, Quavo, Takeoff	Red Alert
"Either Way" (Remix)	2017	K. Michelle, Yo Gotti, O.T. Genasis	None
"3's Company"	2017	Snoop Dogg, O.T. Genasis	Make America Crip Again
"Save It for Me"	2017	Yo Gotti	I Still Am
"Classic You"	2017	T-Pain	Oblivion
"Bentley Truck"	2017	Dave East, Kap G	Karma
"Booty" (Remix)	2018	Blac Youngsta, Jeezy, Trey Songz	2.23
"Drippin"	2018	Rich the Kid	The World Is Yours
"Focus" (DJ Envy Remix)	2018	H.E.R.	None
"Set the Record Straight"	2018	Tee Grizzley	Activated
"Fuck It Off"	2018	Tee Grizzley	Activated
"All My Life"	2018	Jacquees	4275
"Man Down"	2018	YBN Nahmir	YBN: The Mixtape
"Stop Playing"	2018	Fre$h	frēsh•ism
"Toot That Whoa Whoa" (Remix)	2018	A1, PC	Turbulence
"Paperwork"	2018	Lil Twist	None
"Duck My Ex"	2018	Tory Lanez, 2 Chainz	Love Me Now?
"Flexible"	2018	Tory Lanez, Lil Baby	Love Me Now?
"Surrounded"	2018	MihTy, Wiz Khalifa	MihTy
"Don't Say Shit"	2018	Trey Songz, Fabolous	28
"Overdose" (TSD Remix)	2018	Agnez Mo, Juicy J	None
"Type a Way" (Spanish Remix)	2019	Eric Bellinger, OG Parker	None
"Dirty" (Remix)	2019	Tank, Feather, Rahky	Elevation
"February Love"	2019	Tyga	Legendary
"Must Be" (Remix)	2019	Rockie Fresh, Jon Z	None
"Wanted"	2019	CRZY	Van Gogh
"1 Question"	2019	E-40, Jeremih, Rick Ross	Practice Makes Paper
"Waterbed"	2019	Blaq Tuxedo	Blaq Tuxedo
"Turn Me On"	2019	Snoop Dogg	I Wanna Thank Me
"Vibe Is"	2019	Sherwood Marty	Fresh Prince of Sherwood
"Every Night"	2019	Berner, Wiz Khalifa	La Plaza
"Ignore Me"	2019	A1	None
"Gangstas Make the Girls Go Wild"	2019	The Game	Born 2 Rap
"Us vs. The World"	2019	Fabolous, Teyana Taylor	Summertime Shootout 3: Coldest Summer Ever
"Shake It"	2019	Blac Youngsta, Ty Dolla $ign	Church on Sunday
"Tank"	2020	Kai Ca$h, K Wales	None
"Finally"	2020	Joyner Lucas	ADHD
"Tryna Smoke" (Remix)	2020	Jhené Aiko, Snoop Dogg	Chilombo
"Rodeo"	2020	YG, Tyga	My Life 4Hunnid
"Sexual"	2020	Dave East	Karma 3
"Mood"	2020	Trippie Redd	Pegasus
"Nasty"	2020	Lil Keed	Trapped on Cleveland 3
"What It Is" (Remix)	2020	Kyle	None
"Shopping Spree"	2020	Davido, Young Thug	A Better Time
"Track Star" (Remix)	2021	Mooski, A Boogie wit da Hoodie, Yung Bleu	Melodic Therapy 4 The Broken
"Check for Me"	2021	Ann Marie	Hate Love
"Gyalis (Remix)"	2021	Capella Grey, Popcaan	None
"Do I Ever"	2021	Tone Stith	Still FWM
"Time N Affection"	2022	Rema	Rave & Roses
"I Do"	2022	Nick Cannon	Raw & B
"Welcome Back"	2022	Joey Bada$$, Capella Grey	2000
"Diana"	2022	Fireboy DML, Shenseea	Playboy
"Universal Love"	2022	The Game, Chlöe, Cassie	Drillmatic – Heart vs. Mind
"Special"	2022	Ray J, Designer Doubt	Raydemption
"No Days Off"	2023	Shy Glizzy	Flowers
"Distant Lover"	2023	Yung Bleu	Love Scars II
"Motion" (Remix)	2023	Ty Dolla $ign	None
"City of Dreams"	2023	Tyla Yaweh	Heart Full of Rage 2
"City of God"	2023	Tee Grizzley	Tee's Coney Island
"Open Wide"	2023	Busta Rhymes, Shenseea	Blockbusta
"Drunk Off U"	2024	Moneybagg Yo	Speak Now
"Play Your Part"	2024	G Herbo	Big Swerv 2.0
"Compadre"	2025	Kap G	Real Migo Shit 5
"Animal"	2025	Joyner Lucas, Juice Wrld	ADHD 2
"Momma"	2025	Joyner Lucas	ADHD 2
"Supermans Weakness"	2026	Jozzy	Soundtrack 2 Get Her Back
"From the Back" (Remix)	2026	Lil Baby	Fresh
"Face Card" (Remix)	2026	Skilla Baby, Bryson Tiller, Summer Walker	None

== Production discography ==
List of production and songwriting credits (excluding guest appearances, interpolations, and samples)
Track	Year	Credit	Artist	Album
5. "Picture Perfect"; (featuring will.i.am)	2007	Co-producer (with will.i.am)	Chris Brown	Exclusive
20. "Picture Perfect" (Remix); (featuring Bow Wow and Hurricane Chris)	2007	Co-producer (with will.i.am)	Chris Brown	Exclusive
13. "Disturbia"	2008	Songwriter, background vocals	Rihanna	Good Girl Gone Bad: Reloaded
10. "Yamaha Mama"; (featuring Sean Kingston)	2008	Songwriter	Soulja Boy	iSouljaBoyTellem
9. "Bad Girl"	2009	Songwriter	The Pussycat Dolls	Confessions of a Shopaholic
11. "Takes Time to Love"	2009	Songwriter	Trey Songz	Confessions of a Shopaholic
2. "She Ain't Got..."	2009	Songwriter	LeToya Luckett	Lady Love
11. "Drained"	2009	Songwriter	LeToya Luckett	Lady Love
4. "Stronger"	2009	Songwriter, background vocals	Mary J. Blige	Music Inspired by More than a Game
4. "What Do You Say"	2010	Songwriter	Omarion	Ollusion
16. "Love Suicide"; (featuring Ester Dean)	2010	Songwriter	Tinie Tempah	Disc-Overy
12. "Should've Kissed You"	2011	Co-producer (with Brian Kennedy and T-Wiz)	Chris Brown	F.A.M.E.
9. "Favor"; (featuring Kelly Rowland)	2011	Songwriter	Lonny Bereal	The Love Train
3. "See No More"	2011	Co-producer (with Brian Kennedy), background vocals	Joe Jonas	Fastlife
11. "Lighthouse"	2011	Co-producer (with Hit-Boy), background vocals	Joe Jonas	Fastlife
8. "Christmas Eve"	2011	Co-producer (with Amadeus and Boogie Wizzard), background vocals	Justin Bieber	Under the Mistletoe
4. "Mirage"	2012	Co-producer (with H-Money)	Chris Brown	Fortune
12. "Cadillac (Interlude)"	2012	Producer	Chris Brown	Fortune
17. "Remember My Name"	2012	Producer (with Free School and Jonas Jeberg)	Chris Brown	Fortune
18. "Wait for You"	2012	Co-producer (with H-Money)	Chris Brown	Fortune
4. "Slower"	2012	Songwriter	Brandy	Two Eleven
6. "Emotions"	2014	Songwriter, background vocals	Jennifer Lopez	A.K.A.
10. "Booty"; (featuring Pitbull or Iggy Azalea)	2014	Songwriter	Jennifer Lopez	A.K.A.
14. "Same Girl"; (solo or featuring French Montana)	2014	Songwriter, background vocals	Jennifer Lopez	A.K.A.
13. "Valentine"	2014	Songwriter	JYJ	Just Us
"No Time to Waste" (featuring Wale)	2016	Songwriter, background vocals	4EY The Future	None
"Baby Love" (featuring R. City)	2017	Songwriter	Samantha J	None
10. "Like It"; (with 6LACK)	2019	Songwriter	Summer Walker	Over It
18. "New Again"	2021	Songwriter, guest vocalist on original release	Kanye West	Donda
9. "Nightmares"; (featuring Byron Messia)	2023	Co-producer (with Chopstix)	Chris Brown	11:11
7. "Whatever"	2025	Songwriter	Keri Hilson	We Need to Talk: Love

== Notes ==
- A "Superhuman" did not enter the Hot R&B/Hip-Hop Songs chart, but peaked at number 20 on the Bubbling Under R&B/Hip-Hop Singles chart.
- B "Yeah 3x" did not enter the Hot R&B/Hip-Hop Songs chart, but peaked at number 22 on the Bubbling Under R&B/Hip-Hop Singles chart.
- C "Beautiful People" did not enter the Hot R&B/Hip-Hop Songs chart, but peaked at number 1 on the Bubbling Under R&B/Hip-Hop Singles chart.
- E "Make the World Go Round" did not enter the Hot R&B/Hip-Hop Songs chart, but peaked at number 22 on the Bubbling Under R&B/Hip-Hop Singles chart.
- F "Head of My Class" did not enter the Hot R&B/Hip-Hop Songs chart, but peaked at number 23 on the Bubbling Under R&B/Hip-Hop Singles chart.
- H "Ain't Thinkin' 'Bout You" did not enter the Billboard Hot 100, but peaked at number 11 on the Bubbling Under Hot 100 Singles chart.
- I "Pot of Gold" did not enter the Billboard Hot 100, but peaked at number 1 on the Bubbling Under Hot 100 Singles chart.
- J "International Love" did not enter the Hot R&B/Hip-Hop Songs chart, but peaked at number 11 on the Bubbling Under R&B/Hip-Hop Singles chart.
- K "Algo Me Gusta de Ti" did not enter the Billboard Hot 100, but peaked at number 10 on the Bubbling Under Hot 100 Singles chart.
- L "Long Gone" did not enter the Billboard Hot 100, but peaked at number 21 on the Bubbling Under Hot 100 Singles chart. It did not enter the Hot R&B/Hip-Hop Songs chart, but peaked at number 2 on the Bubbling Under R&B/Hip-Hop Singles chart.
- M "Ya Man Ain't Me" did not enter the Hot R&B/Hip-Hop Songs chart, but peaked at number 1 on the Bubbling Under R&B/Hip-Hop Singles chart.
- N "Damage" did not enter the Hot R&B/Hip-Hop Songs chart, but peaked at number 21 on the Bubbling Under R&B/Hip-Hop Singles chart.
- O "Better on the Other Side" did not enter the Hot R&B/Hip-Hop Songs chart, but peaked at number 13 on the Bubbling Under R&B/Hip-Hop Singles chart.
- P "Another Planet" did not enter the Hot R&B/Hip-Hop Songs chart, but peaked at number 2 on the Bubbling Under R&B/Hip-Hop Singles chart.
- Q "Oh Yeah" did not enter the Hot R&B/Hip-Hop Songs chart, but peaked at number 19 on the Bubbling Under R&B/Hip-Hop Singles chart.
- R "Paper, Scissors, Rock" did not enter the Hot R&B/Hip-Hop Songs chart, but peaked at number 23 on the Bubbling Under R&B/Hip-Hop Singles chart.
- S "Undercover" did not enter the Hot R&B/Hip-Hop Songs chart, but peaked at number 15 on the Bubbling Under R&B/Hip-Hop Singles chart.
- T "Look at Her Go" did not enter the Billboard Hot 100, but peaked at number 22 on the Bubbling Under Hot 100 Singles chart.
- U "Arena" did not enter the Billboard Hot 100, but peaked at number 16 on the Bubbling Under Hot 100 Singles chart.
- V "Marry Go Round" did not enter the Hot R&B/Hip-Hop Songs chart, but peaked at number 1 on the Bubbling Under R&B/Hip-Hop Singles chart.
- W "Anyway" did not enter the Billboard Hot 100, but peaked at number 7 on the Bubbling Under Hot 100 Singles.
- X "Wrist" did not enter the Billboard Hot 100, but peaked at number 17 on the Bubbling Under Hot 100 Singles.
- Z "Songs on 12 Play" did not enter the Billboard Hot 100, but peaked at number 25 on the Bubbling Under Hot 100 Singles.
- Z "Drunk Texting" did not enter the Billboard Hot 100, but peaked at number 24 on the Bubbling Under Hot 100 Singles.
- Z "Autumn Leaves" did not enter the Billboard Hot 100, but peaked at number 10 on the Bubbling Under Hot 100 Singles.

== See also ==
- Chris Brown videography
