= RnG Muzic =

Mixtape by Kevin McCall & Constantine
- Released: January 8, 2015
- Genre: Hip hop; R&B
- Length: 35:43
- Producer: Kevin McCall; A. Blake; The Komposers; Mike Free; Mannie J.; Coop The Truth; Big Fruit
- Compiler: DJ Carisma

Kevin McCall chronology
A.D.H.D. (2014)	RnG Muzic (2015)

Constantine chronology
Constantine (2011)	RnG Muzic (2015)

RnG Muzic is the first collaborative mixtape by American singers Kevin McCall and Constantine. It was released January 8, 2015. It is hosted by DJ Carisma and features guest appearances from Gucci Mane, Ken Mailk and Lola Monroe. On January 2, the music video to "CoCo" (Rng Mix) was released and directed by Gold Glass Productions.

== Track list ==
No.	Title	Producer(s)	Length
1.	"Girls That Go"	Mike Free	1:29
2.	"Just Do It"	The Komposers	3:31
3.	"Imma Real East Side Nigga (Interlude)"		0:29
4.	"Try Me (RnG Mix)"		3:01
5.	"Get Her Attention"	Mannie J.	3:31
6.	"Neck Roll"	A. Blake	3:15
7.	"Never Had Shit" (featuring Gucci Mane)	Kevin McCall	3:06
8.	"She Throw It Back"	A. Blake	2:53
9.	"CoCo (RnG Mix)"		3:14
10.	"No Type (RnG Mix)"		3:29
11.	"Thug Love" (featuring Lola Monroe)	Mike Free	3:09
12.	"Let's Get Back Together"	Coop The Truth	2:38
13.	"For Nothin'" (featuring Ken Mailk)	Big Fruit	3:58
