= Strip (Chris Brown song) =

Single by Chris Brown featuring Kevin McCall

from the album Boy in Detention and Fortune
- Released: November 18, 2011
- Recorded: 2010
- Genre: R&B; hip hop
- Length: 2:49
- Label: RCA
- Songwriters: Chris Brown, Sevyn Streeter, Joseph Lonny Bereal, Kevin McCall
- Producer: Tha Bizness

Chris Brown singles chronology
"Another Round" (2011)	"Strip" (2011)	"Why Stop Now" (2011)

Kevin McCall singles chronology
"Deuces" (2010)	"Strip" (2011)	"Naked" (2012)

Music video
- "Strip" on YouTube

"Strip" is a song by American singer Chris Brown, featuring American singer and rapper Kevin McCall, released as a single from his mixtape Boy In Detention and as a buzz single from Brown's fifth studio album Fortune on November 18, 2011. It was written by Brown, Sevyn Streeter, Christopher Whitacre, J. Lonny Bereal, Justin Henderson and McCall, while production was handled by Tha Bizness. "Strip" peaked at number 37 on the US Billboard Hot 100, and number three on the US Hot R&B/Hip-Hop Songs chart.

== Background and composition ==
"Strip" was written by Chris Brown, Sevyn Streeter, Christopher Whitacre, J. Lonny Bereal, Justin Henderson and Kevin McCall, while production was handled by Tha Bizness. The song first appeared on Brown's mixtape Boy in Detention in 2011. On October 27, 2011, Brown announced via his official Twitter account that "Strip" and "Biggest Fan" would serve as the two lead singles from his fifth studio album Fortune (2012). However, following the online premiere of "Turn Up the Music" on January 26, 2012, several websites, including MTV News and Billboard magazine, reported that this would be the lead single from the album, while "Strip" served as a buzz single. The official remix of the song, made by Brown and McCall, was posted online on April 5, 2012, and features a slower instrumental and newly performed verses from both singers.

Musically, "Strip" is a "bouncy synth-heavy" R&B and hip hop song, with lyrics of Brown crooning to a stripper. Vulture described Brown as taking the role of a "hypersexual goofball" as he admires the strippers beauty and sex appeal. As stated by Lewis Corner of Digital Spy, the track features "booty-bouncing mix of pulsing beats and '90s-styled melodies." The chorus borrows from the bridge from the mixtape Fan of a Fan version of "Ain't Thinkin' 'Bout You", performed by Brown and features rapper Bow Wow.

== Music video ==
The accompanying music video for "Strip" was directed by Colin Tilley and filmed in November 2011. An image from the shoot was posted online on November 27, 2011, which showed Brown surrounded by Christmas lights. The video premiered online on December 15, 2011. The video opens with Brown standing on a mountain wearing a winter jacket, cap and shorts. It then switches to a house party where Brown is seen with his shirt off, singing in a room full of people dancing. During the second chorus, Brown and McCall are seen sitting on the edge of a hot tub, while girls in bikinis are in the tub. As McCall performs his verse, he plays an accelerated game of "Seven Minutes in Heaven" with two girls in a closet. Once his time is up, he switches with another man. Throughout the video, scenes of Brown singing the song in a room full of Christmas lights are intercut.

Georgette Cline of The Boombox wrote that the video is "steaming hot". A writer for International Business Times wrote that, "The video is perfectly apt for the lyrics of the song." Chris Eggertsen of HitFix gave the video a mixed response, calling it an "embarrassingly-generic music video".

== Chart performance ==
In the United States, "Strip" debuted at number 90 on the Hot R&B/Hip Hop Songs chart on the issue dated November 12, 2011, despite not being released for digital download until November 18, 2011. It peaked at number three on the issue dated March 10, 2012. The song debuted at number 85 on US Billboard Hot 100 chart on the week of December 10, 2011. It eventually peaked at number 37 on the week of March 31, 2012. On October 3, 2016, the single was certified platinum by the Recording Industry Association of America (RIAA) for combined sales and streaming equivalent units of over a million units in the United States.

== Track listing ==
- Digital download
1. "Strip" (featuring Kevin "K-MAC" McCall) – 2:49

== Credits and personnel ==
Credits adapted from the liner notes for Fortune

- J. Lonny Bereal – songwriter
- Chris Brown – lead vocals, songwriter
- Doug Geikie – assistant recorder
- Trehy Harris – assistant recorder
- Justin Henderson – songwriter
- Jaycen Joshua – mixer
- Kevin McCall – guest vocals, songwriter
- Brian Springer – recorder
- Amber Streeter – songwriter
- Tha Bizness – producer
- Christopher Whitacre – songwriter

== Charts ==
=== Weekly charts ===
Weekly chart performance for "Strip"
Chart (2011–12)	Peak position
Australia (ARIA)	76
Australia Urban (ARIA)	22
Belgium (Ultratip Bubbling Under Flanders)	51
Netherlands (Single Top 100)	95
South Korea International Singles (Gaon)	43
UK Hip Hop/R&B (Official Charts)	21
UK Singles (Official Charts Company)	78
US Billboard Hot 100	37
US Hot R&B/Hip-Hop Songs (Billboard)	3
US Rhythmic Airplay (Billboard)	12

=== Year-end charts ===
2012 year-end chart performance for "Strip"
Chart (2012)	Position
US Hot R&B/Hip-Hop Songs (Billboard)	9
US Rhythmic (Billboard)	37

== Certifications ==
Certifications for "Strip"
Region	Certification	Certified units/sales
Australia (ARIA)	Platinum	70,000^{‡}
New Zealand (RMNZ)	Platinum	30,000^{‡}
United States (RIAA)	2× Platinum	2,000,000^{‡}
^{‡} Sales+streaming figures based on certification alone.

== Release history ==
Country	Date	Format	Label
Australia	November 18, 2011	Digital download	RCA Records
Belgium	November 18, 2011	Digital download	RCA Records
Canada	November 18, 2011	Digital download	RCA Records
Denmark	November 18, 2011	Digital download	RCA Records
France	November 18, 2011	Digital download	RCA Records
Italy	November 18, 2011	Digital download	RCA Records
Netherlands	November 18, 2011	Digital download	RCA Records
Norway	November 18, 2011	Digital download	RCA Records
Sweden	November 18, 2011	Digital download	RCA Records
United States	November 18, 2011	Digital download	RCA Records
United States	December 6, 2011	Urban contemporary radio	RCA Records
