= Naked (Kevin McCall song) =

Single by Kevin McCall featuring Big Sean
- Released: May 4, 2012
- Genre: R&B; hip hop
- Length: 4:21
- Label: RCA
- Songwriters: Big Sean; Kevin McCall; Maurice David Wade

Kevin McCall singles chronology
"Strip" (2011)	"Naked" (2012)	"You Got Me" (2012)

Big Sean singles chronology
"Till I Die" (2012)	"Naked" (2012)	"My Homies Still" (2012)

Music video
- "Naked" on YouTube

"Naked" is a song by American rapper Kevin McCall featuring rapper Big Sean, released by RCA Records as McCall's debut single on May 4, 2012. The song peaked 77 on the Billboard Hot R&B/Hip-Hop Songs.

== Background ==
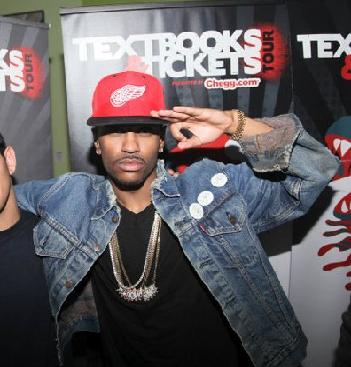
The song features Big Sean

Talking about the song in an interview, McCall explained: "There was a young producer/songwriter named David Wade, he came on the record and by the time the hook came in, I was like “this is nice.” It kind of reminds me of "SexyBack" by Justin Timberlake. I just felt like it was really young and fresh and something different than what everybody else was doing. So, I had to go in on it and put my little twist on it. It came out great. We went and got Big Sean, that took it to the next level. Shout out to Big Sean for blessing me with that verse."

== Music video ==
The music video for "Naked" was directed by Chris Brown and Godfrey Tabarez and filmed in Los Angeles, California in April 2012. It was premiered on May 22, 2012.

== Track list ==
=== Digital single ===
No.	Title	Length
1.	"Naked" (featuring Big Sean)	4:21

== Chart performance ==
Chart (2012)	Peak position
US Hot R&B/Hip-Hop Songs (Billboard)	77
