= No Bullshit =

Single by Chris Brown

from the album Fan of a Fan and F.A.M.E.
- A-side: "Deuces"
- Released: January 18, 2011
- Recorded: 2010, Richmond, Virginia (In Your Ear Studios)
- Genre: R&B
- Length: 4:07
- Label: Jive
- Songwriters: Christopher Brown; Kevin McCall
- Producer: Tha Bizness

Chris Brown singles chronology
"Ain't Thinkin' 'Bout You" (2010)	"No Bullshit" (2011)	"Look at Me Now" (2011)

Music video
- "No Bullshit" on YouTube

"No Bullshit", also stylized as "No BS", is a song by American recording artist Chris Brown, released as a single from his collaborative mixtape with rapper Tyga, Fan of a Fan (2010). The song was originally recorded to be included on Brown's previous mixtape In My Zone (2010), but was later included on his fourth studio album F.A.M.E. (2011). Musically it has been described as an "R&B slow-jam", while lyrically the song explores sexual themes, with Brown encouraging a woman to come back to his apartment in the hope that she will "do it all night". "No BS" was written by Brown, Kevin McCall and produced by Tha Bizness. The song received comparisons to works by Jodeci and R. Kelly, for its similar musical direction.

Critical reception towards the song was positive, with critics praising Brown's vocal performance and the song's production. The song peaked at number three on the US Billboard Hot R&B/Hip-Hop Songs, number one on urban radio, and number 62 on the US Billboard Hot 100.

== Music video ==
The music video for "No Bullshit" was directed by Colin Tilley and premiered online on May 24, 2010 along with the video for "Deuces". In the video, Brown is seen wooing and romancing his leading lady. It shows them kissing, licking, and touching on display in the shower, living room, and bedroom. During the video Brown is also seen dancing on a rooftop in a black outfit. The girl in the video is wearing all black.

== Critical reception ==
AllMusic editor Andy Kellman was positive about the song: "then there was the smoothly percussive "No BS", a slow jam with chivalrous sweet nothings like "I’m-a leave it in when we do it" and "Don’t you be on that bullshit". The A.V. Club's Evan Rytlewsky described the song as an "after-dark fare." Entertainment Weekly wrote an impressed opinion stating that it leads to intoxicating hooks, calling it a "bedroom knocker" and continued: "which for better (or worse), rivals the bump-'n'-grind heights of '90s Casanova crew Jodeci." David Amidon of PopMatters wrote a mixed review: "But then there are the songs like "No Bullshit" he'll no doubt be expected to slow his sets with. The "no bullshit" is his ability to make love for an entire night, of course. He'd also prefer that you "don’t be on that bullshit" as far as disbelieving him is concerned."

== Release and chart performance ==
"No BS" was initially released exclusively as a B-side to Brown's previous single "Deuces", the song was later released to rhythmic radio on January 18, 2011 as a single in its own right. The song peaked at number 62 on the US Billboard Hot 100 chart and number three on the US Hot R&B/Hip-Hop Songs chart.

== Credits and personnel ==
- Christopher Brown - songwriter, lead vocals
- Kevin McCall (K-Mac) - songwriter
- Christopher Whitacre - songwriter, producer
- Justin Henderson - songwriter, producer
- Brian Springler - audio mixing
- Ghazi Hourani - assistant audio mixing

== Charts ==
=== Weekly charts ===
Weekly chart performance for "No Bullshit"
Chart (2010–2011)	Peak position
US Billboard Hot 100	62
US Adult R&B Songs (Billboard)	30
US Hot R&B/Hip-Hop Songs (Billboard)	3
US Rhythmic Airplay (Billboard)	33

=== Year-end charts ===
2011 year-end chart performance for "No Bullshit"
Chart (2011)	Position
US Hot R&B/Hip-Hop Songs (Billboard)	17

== Certifications ==
Certifications for "No Bullshit"
Region	Certification	Certified units/sales
United States (RIAA)	Platinum	1,000,000^{‡}
^{‡} Sales+streaming figures based on certification alone.
