= Wake Up (SkyLar Blatt song) =

Single by SkyLar Blatt featuring Chris Brown
- Released: April 26, 2024
- Recorded: 2023
- Length: 2:53
- Label: Arista
- Lyricists: Skylar Blatt; Chris Brown; Sade Johnson
- Producers: TM88; Too Dope

Skylar Blatt singles chronology
"Laughin to tha Bank" (2024)	"Wake Up" (2024)	"Hold Me Down" (2024)

Chris Brown singles chronology
"FTCU (SleezeMix)" (2024)	"Wake Up" (2024)	"UnLonely" (2024)

Music video
- "Wake Up" on YouTube

"Wake Up" is a song by American rapper SkyLar Blatt, featuring singer Chris Brown. It was released as a single on April 26, 2024, through Arista Records.

== Background and composition ==
"Wake Up" was originally previewed in 2023 through Instagram. The track was described for being a "melodic" song with a "feel-good, Summery" production based on "clean guitars and thumping percussions". Blatt and Brown's performances feature "inspirational bars" and "singing gangsterisms".

== Music video ==
The music video for "Wake Up" was shot in 2023 at Brown's California mansion and its surroundings, and released alongside the song. In the visual, the two are seen at an outdoor basketball court, and cruising through the streets.

== Charts ==
=== Weekly charts ===
Chart performance for "Wake Up"
Chart (2024)	Peak position
New Zealand Hot Singles (RMNZ)	6
US R&B/Hip-Hop Airplay (Billboard)	15
US Radio Songs (Billboard)	45
US Rhythmic Airplay (Billboard)	7

=== Year-end charts ===
2024 year-end chart performance for "Wake Up"
Chart (2024)	Position
US Rhythmic (Billboard)	34
