= RRose RRome =

American rapper

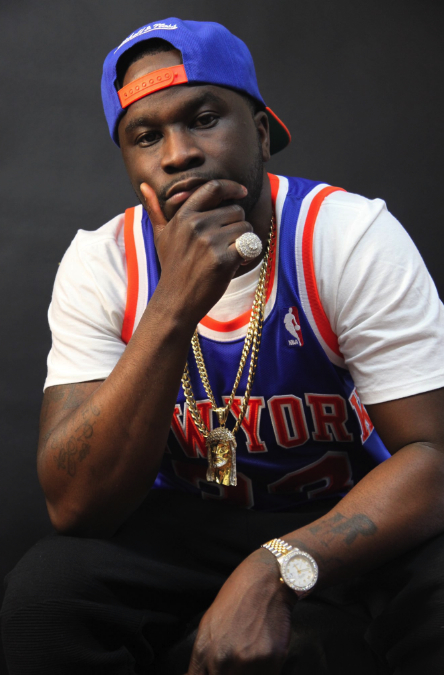

Background information
- Born: Jerome Warrington Harris; November 20, 1989 (age 36); Brooklyn, New York City, U.S.
- Genre: East Coast hip-hop
- Occupations: Rapper; singer; songwriter
- Years active: 2014–present

Jerome Warrington Harris, known professionally as RRose RRome, is an American rapper.

== Career ==
Harris began his music career in 2014 but had a passion for music since his childhood. He went on to practice his singing in a studio and has since released dozens of songs and music videos; his work has been featured on television in MTV and Music Choice as well as on the radio in WQHT and WWPR-FM. His song with Chris Brown titled "Draco" surpassed 300,000 went viral in 2017.

In March 2026, RRose RRome released “All Year”, a single featuring Max B and produced by Gq Beats. TheSource.com described the track as a Brooklyn rap collaboration combining RRome’s performance with Max B’s signature “wave” sound.

== Discography ==
=== Albums ===
- Take this Serious
- Rose Gold (2021)
- The Sample

=== Singles ===
- "All Year"
- "Bucks n Billies"
- "Balenciaga"
- "Excellent"
- "Buss it"
- "Rocks and Roses"
- "You ain’t a Killer"
- "Money Calling"
- "Dry Cry"
- "Get Around"
- "What's the Issue"
- "Dope Fiend"
- "B.R.O.W.N."
- "Make it Count"
- "O-u-t-s-i-d-e" (2022)
- "Hellcat" (2023)

=== Featured in ===
- "Draco (freestyle)" with Chris Brown
- "No Time" with Maino
- "Ziploc" with Jadakiss
- "Like that" with Sheek Louch
- "Smack" with Murda Mook
