= Kevin McCall =

American singer and record producer (born 1985)

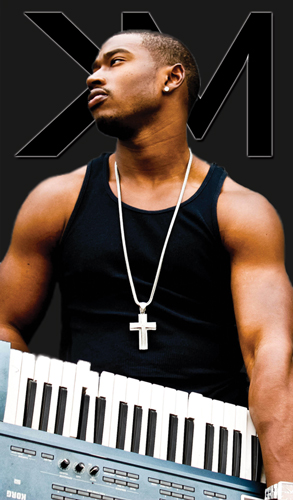
- McCall in 2010

Background information
- Also known as: K-Mac
- Born: Kevin Lamar McCall Jr. July 25, 1985 (age 41); Los Angeles, California, U.S.
- Origin: Seattle, Washington, U.S.
- Genres: R&B; pop; hip hop
- Occupations: Singer; rapper; songwriter; record producer
- Years active: 2007–present
- Labels: Epic; RCA
- Children: 2
- Website: kevinmccalljr.com

Kevin Lamar McCall Jr. (born July 25, 1985) is an American singer, rapper, songwriter, and record producer. He is best known for his work with R&B singer Chris Brown, to whom he signed in a joint venture with RCA Records in 2012.

McCall extensively contributed to Brown's discography in the early 2010s through songwriting and production. He guest performed alongside Tyga on Brown's 2010 single "Deuces," as well as his 2011 single "Strip," which peaked at numbers 14 and 37 on the Billboard Hot 100, respectively. McCall's 2012 debut single, "Naked" (featuring Big Sean) seldom entered the Hot R&B/Hip-Hop Songs chart, and he later parted ways with RCA and Brown two years later in favor of an independent career. In the following years, McCall has faced financial difficulties and waged a public feud with Brown over his contributions to Brown's songs.

== Early life ==
Kevin Lamar McCall Jr. was born in Los Angeles, California, on July 25, 1985. He has three sisters. He went to high school in Carson, California. Though he played football through most of his childhood and in college at Washington State University, he always had interest in music. Also while at Washington State, he became a member of Omega Psi Phi. McCall started singing in the church choir, and later taught himself to play piano.

== Personal life ==
McCall has two daughters..

== Discography ==
=== Albums ===
- Sincerely, Kevin (2018)
- The Eargasm 2.0 (2025)
- The Eargasm III (2025)

=== EPs ===
List of extended plays, with year released
Title	Album details
Sextape	Released: June 26, 2013; Format: Digital download
Xmas Love	Released: December 2, 2013; Format: Digital download

=== Mixtapes ===
List of mixtapes, with year released
Title	Album details
Un-Invited Guest	Released: February 14, 2011; Hosted by DJ Ill Will and DJ Drama; Format: Digital download
The Eargazm	Released: September 5, 2011; Hosted by DJ Ill Will; Format: Digital download
Definition	Released: February 14, 2013; Hosted by DJ Holiday; Format: Digital download
A.D.H.D. (Bangerz)	Released: April 10, 2014; Format: Digital download
RnG Muzic (with Constantine)	Released: January 8, 2015; Hosted by DJ Carisma; Format: Digital download

=== Singles ===
==== As lead artist ====
List of singles, with selected chart positions, showing year released and album name
Title	Year	Peak chart positions		Album
Title	Year	US	US R&B/HH	Album
"Naked" (featuring Big Sean)	2012	—	77	Non-album singles
"Start All Over"	2015	—	—	Non-album singles
"Tokyo Japan"	2016	—	—	Non-album singles
"Baerrueche"	2016	—	—	Non-album singles
"Strung Out"	2016	—	—	Non-album singles
"All On U"	2016	—	—	Non-album singles
"The Secret"	2017	—	—	Non-album singles
"My Piano"	2020	—	—	Non-album singles
"Risk it All"	2025	—	—	Non-album singles

==== As featured artist ====
List of singles, with selected chart positions, showing year released and album name
Title	Year	Peak chart positions		Certifications	Album
Title	Year	US	US R&B/HH	Certifications	Album
"Deuces" (Chris Brown featuring Tyga and Kevin McCall)	2010	14	1	RIAA: 2× Platinum; BPI: Silver	Fan of a Fan and F.A.M.E
"Strip" (Chris Brown featuring Kevin McCall)	2011	37	3	RIAA: Platinum; ARIA: Platinum	Boy in Detention and Fortune
"You Got Me" (Keke Palmer featuring Kevin McCall)	2012	—	—		Keke Palmer
"Side Bitch" (Branonthetrack featuring Kevin McCall)	2014	—	—		Branonthetrack
"Gogo" (Danny Fernandes featuring Kevin McCall)	2015	—	—		Non-album single
"Keep On" (Major featuring Kevin McCall)	2016	—	—		I Am MAJOR

=== Production and writing credits ===
Title	Year	Album	Artist
"Turnt Up"	2010	In My Zone	Chris Brown
"Too Freaky"	2010	In My Zone	Chris Brown
"Shoes"	2010	In My Zone	Chris Brown, La the Darkman
"Big Booty Judy"	2010	In My Zone	Kevin McCall, Chris Brown
"Back Out"	2010	In My Zone	Chris Brown
"Work Wit It"	2010	In My Zone	Chris Brown
"I Get Around"	2010	In My Zone	Chris Brown
"Twitter (Follow Me)"	2010	In My Zone	Chris Brown, Kevin McCall
"T.Y.A."	2010	In My Zone	Chris Brown
"Sex"	2010	In My Zone	Chris Brown
"What They Want"	2010	Fan of a Fan	Chris Brown, Tyga
"Drop Top Girl"	2010	Fan of a Fan	Chris Brown, Tyga
"Deuces"	2010	Fan of a Fan	Chris Brown, Tyga, Kevin McCall
"No Bullshit"	2010	Fan of a Fan	Chris Brown, Kevin McCall
"Ballin'"	2010	Fan of a Fan	Chris Brown, Tyga, Kevin McCall
"Ain't Thinkin' 'Bout You"	2010	Fan of a Fan	Bow Wow, Chris Brown
"Like A Virgin Again"	2010	Fan of a Fan	Chris Brown, Tyga, Kevin McCall
"Have It"	2010	Fan of a Fan	Chris Brown, Tyga, Kevin McCall
"Number One"	2010	Fan of a Fan	Chris Brown, Kevin McCall
"Make Love"	2010	Fan of a Fan	Chris Brown, Tyga
"Deuces (Remix)"	2010	Non-album single	Chris Brown, Drake, Kanye West, André 3000, T.I.
"Ms. Breezy"	2010	In My Zone 2	Chris Brown, Gucci Mane
"Shit Got Damn"	2010	In My Zone 2	Chris Brown, Big Sean
"Talk that Shit"	2010	In My Zone 2	Chris Brown
"My Girl Like Them Girls"	2010	In My Zone 2	Chris Brown, J. Valentine
"Fuck Um All"	2010	In My Zone 2	Chris Brown, Kevin McCall, Diesel
"Christmas Came Today"	2010	In My Zone 2	Chris Brown, SeVen of RichGirl
"Glitter"	2010	In My Zone 2	Chris Brown, Big Sean
"What U Doin"	2010	In My Zone 2	Chris Brown, Big Sean
"Drop Rap"	2010	In My Zone 2	Chris Brown, Petey Pablo
"AWOL"	2010	In My Zone 2	Chris Brown
"Seen Her Naked"	2010	In My Zone 2	Chris Brown
"Last Time Together"	2010	In My Zone 2	Chris Brown
"Life Itself"	2010	In My Zone 2	Chris Brown, Kevin McCall
"Sex Love"	2010	In My Zone 2	Chris Brown, Lonny Bereal, SeVen
"Another You"	2010	In My Zone 2	Chris Brown, Kevin McCall
"Boing"	2010	In My Zone 2	Chris Brown
"Quits"	2010	In My Zone 2	Chris Brown, Kevin McCall
"You Want Me"	2010	In My Zone 2	Chris Brown, SeVen
"Put Your Hands in the Air"	2010	In My Zone 2	Chris Brown
"Yesterday"	2010	Last Train to Paris	Diddy – Dirty Money, Chris Brown
"One Night Stand"	2010	No Boys Allowed	Keri Hilson, Chris Brown
"How Many Bars"	2011	Un-invited Guest	Kevin McCall
"Rumba"	2011	With the Music I Die	Wynter Gordon, Kevin McCall
"Roll Up"	2011	Rolling Papers	Wiz Khalifa
"Lighthouse"	2011	Fastlife	Joe Jonas
"Christmas Eve"	2011	Under the Mistletoe	Justin Bieber
"Favor"	2011	The Love Train	Lonny Bereal, Kelly Rowland
"She Ain't You"	2011	F.A.M.E.	Chris Brown
"Bomb"	2011	F.A.M.E.	Chris Brown, Wiz Khalifa
"Wet the Bed"	2011	F.A.M.E.	Chris Brown, Ludacris
"Yeah 3x"	2011	F.A.M.E.	Chris Brown
"My Girl"	2011	Number 1 Girl	Mindless Behavior
"Strip"	2011	Fortune	Chris Brown, Kevin McCall
"Mirage"	2012	Fortune	Chris Brown, Nas
"Key 2 Your Heart"	2012	Fortune	Chris Brown
"Remember My Name"	2012	Fortune	Chris Brown
"2012"	2012	Fortune	Chris Brown
"Off Your Hands"	2012	This Is How I Feel	Tank
"Next Breath"	2012	This Is How I Feel	Tank
"Crazy"	2012	This Is How I Feel	Tank, Kevin McCall
"Special Delivery"	2012	Cut to... Bridget Kelly	Bridget Kelly
"That's That"	2012	Trap God	Gucci Mane, Kevin McCall
"Better Be Good"	2013	Non-album single	RaVaughn, Wale
"Get It All"	2013	Born II Sing Vol. 2	Eric Bellinger, Tank, Kevin McCall
"Life of the Party"	2015	AnnieRUO’TAY 4	TeeFlii, Kevin McCall
"Is You Down"	2015	Brackin	Joe Moses, Kevin McCall
"All Night"	2016	Genesis	Domo Genesis, King Chip
"How Would You Feel"	2016	Crash Course 2	Hbk Cj, Kevin McCall
"Pimpin' Ain't Easy"	2016	Hotels 2 the Master Suite	JasonMartin, TeeFlii, Kevin McCall
"I Wish (Interlude)"	2017	The King & I	The Notorious B.I.G., Faith Evans, Kevin McCall, Chyna Tahjere
"Ready for Whatever"	2017	T.K.O. (The Knock Out)	Mya
"Record Me"	2020	The Pain That Sex Brings	Cherae Leri
"Whatever"	2025	We Need to Talk: Love	Keri Hilson
"For War"	2025	TBA	Omarion

== Awards and nominations ==
- 2011, Best Rap/Song Collaboration: "Deuces" (nominated for a Grammy Award)
