= Deuces (song) =

2011 song by Chris Brown

Single by Chris Brown featuring Tyga and Kevin McCall

from the album Fan of a Fan and F.A.M.E.
- B-side: "No Bullshit"
- Released: June 25, 2010
- Recorded: 2010
- Studio: In Your Ear Studios (Richmond, Virginia)
- Genre: R&B; hip hop
- Length: 4:36
- Label: Jive
- Songwriters: Chris Brown; Michael Stevenson; Kevin McCall
- Producer: Kevin "K-Mac" McCall

Chris Brown singles chronology
"Back to the Crib" (2009)	"Deuces" (2010)	"Make a Movie" (2010)

Tyga singles chronology
"Roger That" (2010)	"Deuces" (2010)	"Loyalty" (2010)

Kevin McCall singles chronology
"Deuces" (2010)	"Strip" (2011)

Music video
- "Deuces" on YouTube

"Deuces" is a song written and performed by American singer Chris Brown featuring American rappers Tyga and Kevin McCall. Produced by McCall, "Deuces" was released digitally on June 25, 2010, as the lead single from Brown's first collaborative effort with Tyga, titled Fan of a Fan (2010). The song is a slow, down-tempo R&B ballad featuring elements from the genres of house and pop music, with lyrics about ending a troubled relationship after failed attempts at reconciliation. "Deuces" was later included as the opening track on Brown's fourth studio album, F.A.M.E. (2011).

Following its release, some critics speculated that the lyrics of the song were about Brown's former relationship with the Barbadian singer Rihanna. "Deuces" earned Brown two award nominations for Best Rap/Sung Collaboration at the 53rd Grammy Awards and Best Collaboration at the 2011 BET Awards. The song was a commercial success in the United States, reaching number 14 on the Billboard Hot 100 and number 1 on the Hot R&B/Hip-Hop Songs chart, becoming Brown's first number 1 single on the chart since "Say Goodbye" (2006). Additionally, it was a hit in New Zealand and performed moderately in the United Kingdom. "Deuces" marked the first major hit for Brown since his felony assault on Rihanna in February 2009.

The accompanying music video was directed by Colin Tilley and shot in black and white at the Los Angeles River. Brown performed "Deuces" live on the television show 106 & Park, during his F.A.M.E. Tour (2011), and at Supafest (2012) in Australia.

== Background and composition ==
"Deuces" was written by Chris Brown, Michael "Tyga" Stevenson and Kevin McCall, who also produced the track. Vocals were recorded by Michael Congdon at the In Your Ear Studios in Richmond, Virginia, with assistance by Dustin Faltz. The recordings were later mixed by Brian Springer at The Record Plant in Los Angeles, California, with assistance by Anthony Taglianett. According to McCall, "Deuces," was originally his song, and he wanted it to be his single, however, he had Brown listening to it while working with him on his collaborative mixtape with Tyga, Fan of a Fan, and the singer told him that “[he needed] that song”, requesting it to him for two weeks. McCall eventually gave it to Brown when the latter told him that he would have his own part on the track.

"Deuces" leaked online on May 20, 2010, and was later released digitally on June 25, 2010 as the first single from Brown's collaborative mixtape with Tyga, Fan of a Fan (2010). In an interview with MTV News, Tyga elaborated on "Deuces" and its theme, stating: "Basically it's about you getting rid of this girl, you tried to make it work, but you got to move on. So you put up one finger, put up another, and then 'Deuces'". The song appeared as the opening track on Brown's fourth studio album, F.A.M.E. (2011).

"Deuces"
A 27-second audio sample of the song, containing lyrics about a failed relationship.

Musically, "Deuces" is a slow, down-tempo R&B ballad that displays elements of house and pop music. The song has a length of four minutes and thirty-six seconds. It is backed by synth chords and "eerie harmonies", with Brown's "smooth vocals" making use of auto-tune effects. According to Sara D. Anderson of AOL Radio, the song contains lyrical content about "breaking it off with a girl after failed attempts to make the relationship work". In the first verse, Brown sings: "All that bullshit is for the birds, you ain't nothing but a vulture / Always hoping for the worst, waiting for me to fuck up / You'll regret the day when I find another girl, that knows just what I need / She knows just what I mean."

== Music video ==
The accompanying music videos for "Deuces" and "No Bullshit" premiered simultaneously online on May 24, 2010, and both were directed by Colin Tilley. The video was shot in black-and-white, and is set at the Los Angeles River. It begins with a woman walking down the river's culvert. As the song begins, Brown, wearing a dark sleeveless jacket, sunglasses, and light-colored pants, sings his verse while standing against a car with Tyga and Kevin McCall. This scene is intercut with scenes of Brown singing alone at the culvert, wearing a hooded jumper and skinny jeans. During the chorus, Brown is seen dancing in a tunnel. As Tyga raps his verse, he is sitting on a graffitied concrete barrier, while Brown appears in the background. This scene is intercut with scenes of Tyga, Brown and McCall walking down a street with a lowrider driving slowly behind them. As the second chorus begins, earlier scenes from the video are intercut with each other. McCall then begins to rap his verse while leaning against a wall, which is then intercut with scenes of him rapping from previous settings of the video. During the final chorus of the song, more scenes of Brown dancing in the tunnel are shown.

== Live performances ==
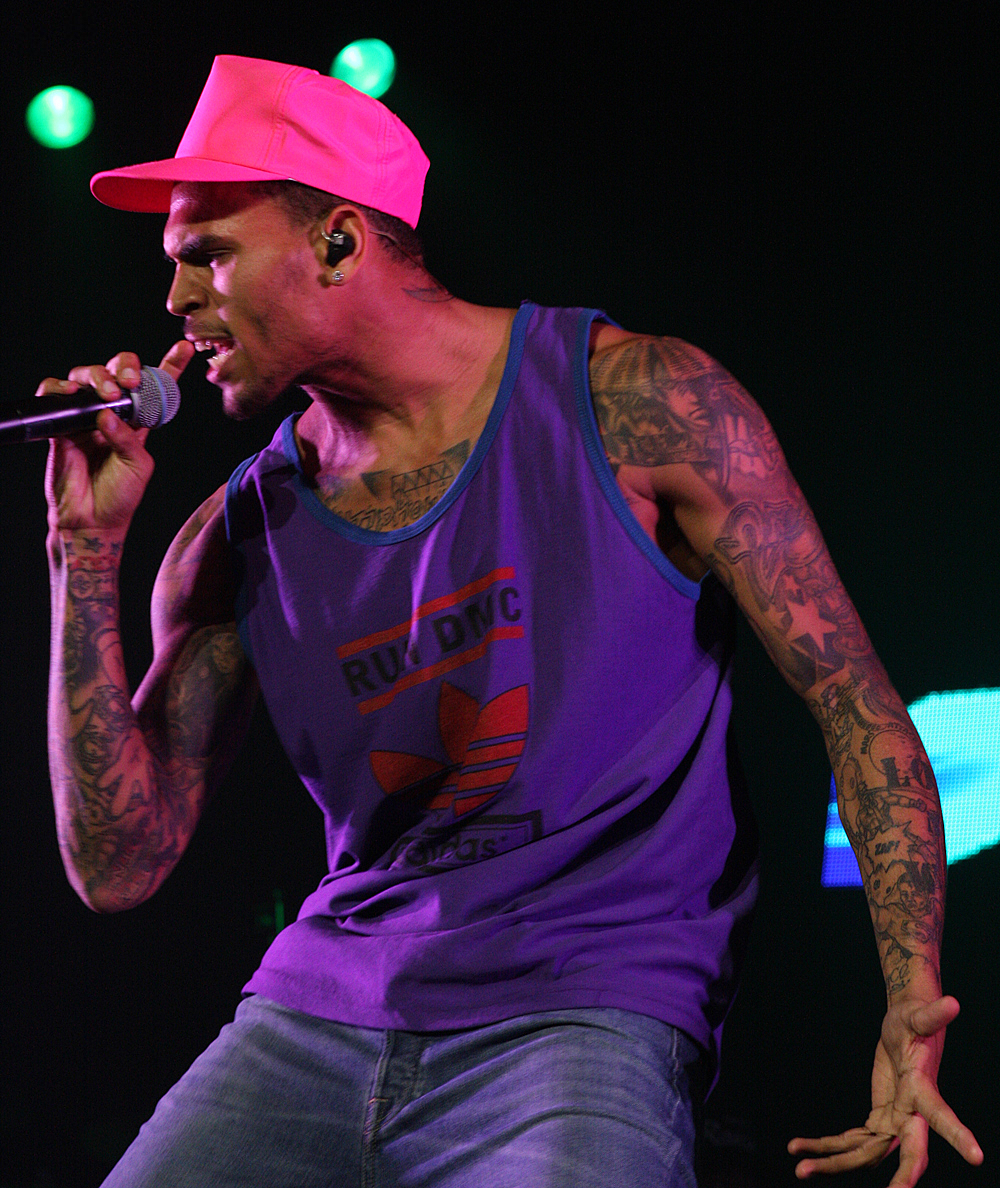
Brown performing at Supafest in Australia, April 2012.

On May 15, 2010, Brown performed "Deuces" with Tyga at the "Virginia Stand Up! A Call to Action" benefit concert as part of a set list, which included "Say Goodbye", "Yo (Excuse Me Miss)", "Gimme That", "Kiss Kiss", "Take You Down" and "Forever". The concert was organized by Brown to help with continued relief efforts in Haiti following the January 2010 earthquake. Jayson Rodriguez of MTV News wrote that "the superstar singer couldn't have been more giving, doing his best to please the packed house". On December 3, 2010, Brown, wearing a charcoal grey suit with Adidas sneakers, performed the song with Tyga and Kevin McCall as part of his set list at the Cali Christmas concert. In March 2011, Brown and Tyga performed "Deuces" on the television music show, 106 & Park. "Deuces" was also added to the set list of Brown's F.A.M.E. Tour. In his review of the tour, Jeremy Trucker of The Baltimore Sun criticized Brown for lip syncing his performances, and remained unconvinced that Brown's "talent was special enough to warrant his continued, well, fame". In April 2012, Brown performed "Deuces" at the Supafest tour in Australia as part of a set list, which included "Run It!", "Yeah 3x", "Look at Me Now", "She Ain't You", "Wet the Bed" and "Turn Up the Music", among others. A reviewer for Rap-Up magazine praised his set, writing "A tatted Chris Brown thrilled with his chart-topping hits".

== Critical reception ==
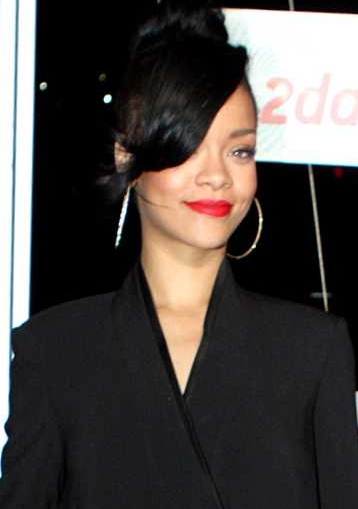
Critics speculated that the lyrics of the song were about Brown's former relationship with Rihanna (pictured).

"Deuces" received mostly positive reviews from critics. Joanne Dorken of MTV UK wrote that the song was "a good platform for Brown to show off his silky-smooth vocals". Hannah Ash of The Harber Herald called it "a great rap track" with "fantastic beats". In an album review for F.A.M.E., Mark Edward Nero of About.com wrote that "Deuces" was one of "the album's best material". A reviewer for Girlfriend magazine wrote that "Deuces" along with "Yeah 3x" and "Beautiful People", were the most "worth listening to" of the album. Mesfin Fekadu of the Associated Press labeled "Deuces" as one of the "best songs" of 2010, while August Brown of Los Angeles Times called it his "favorite single" of 2010. According to Steve Jones of USA Today, the song shows that "Brown is taking it to the next phase". Sean Fennessey of The Washington Post characterised "Deuces" as "the effervescent kiss-off" track. Shahryar Rizvi of Dallas Observer was critical of the song, writing that it "sounds minimally produced and quiet. As a result, it sounds kind of boring". Phoenix New Times called it "a hot track". HotNewHipHop listed it among Brown's best singles in his discography, and defined "Deuces" as a "slow, moody rap and R&B ballad". Billboard wrote that with the track "Chris Brown showed his fans and haters that he can’t be stopped with the perfect mix of smooth vocals and soundscapes".

Critics also speculated that the lyrics of the song were about Brown's former relationship with pop singer Rihanna. Becky Bain of Idolator described "Deuces" as a "bitter woman-hating track" that could be "about Rihanna or just females in general", and wrote that "as damning as some of the lyrics are, this emotional jam is actually a step in the right direction for Brown". Anthony Benigno of The Faster Times observed that the song could be a reference to "the Rihanna incident" and "the now-infamous ordeal", writing "is it about RiRi? Maybe, maybe not. He ain't telling, in any case". Jayson Rodriguez of MTV News wrote that "Deuces" was indeed a "standout" track from the Fan of a Fan mixtape, and that it "appears to be a dig at Rihanna". The song was nominated for Best Rap/Sung Collaboration at the 53rd Grammy Awards, and Best Collaboration at the 2011 BET Awards.

== Remixes ==
In September 2010, during a Ustream session with fans, Brown announced plans of releasing an "all-star" remix to "Deuces", which would feature rappers Drake, T.I., Kanye West, Fabolous, Rick Ross, and André 3000." The remix appeared online on October 1, 2010, and was released as a digital EP on November 2, 2010. A day after the "all-star" remix premiered online, American R&B singer Ciara released her own remix of the song, which was supposed to be included on her Basic Instinct mixtape. American R&B singer Teairra Marí also recorded her own remix of "Deuces" for her mixtape, The Night Before X-Mas (2010). There is also a Spanish remix by De La Ghetto and Ñengo Flow released on October 29, 2010.

== Chart performance ==
In the United States, "Deuces" debuted on the Hot R&B/Hip-Hop Songs chart at number 72 on the issue dated July 17, 2010. It peaked at number one in its ninth week on the chart, becoming Brown's first number-one single on the chart since "Say Goodbye" (2006). "Deuces" was tied with Monica's single "Everything to Me" (2010), for both being the fastest songs in 2010 to climb to the number one spot in nine weeks. "Deuces" peaked at number 14 on the Billboard Hot 100 and spent 19 weeks on the chart. On the New Zealand Singles Chart, "Deuces" debuted and peaked at number 23 on July 26, 2010. It spent six weeks on the chart. In the United Kingdom, "Deuces" debuted and peaked at number 68 on November 20, 2010, and appeared on the chart for one week. It also charted on the UK R&B Singles Chart at number fourteen.

== Track listing ==
- Digital download
1. "Deuces" (featuring Tyga and Kevin McCall) – 4:36
2. "No Bullshit" – 4:07
- Digital Remix EP
1. "Deuces" (featuring Drake and Kanye West) – 4:34
2. "Deuces" (featuring T.I. and Rick Ross) – 3:42
3. "Deuces" (featuring Fabolous and André 3000) – 4:34
4. "Deuces" (featuring Drake, Kanye West and André 3000) – 5:38
5. "Deuces" (featuring Drake, T.I., Kanye West, Fabolous, Rick Ross and André 3000) – 6:43
6. "Deuces" Spanish Remix (featuring De La Ghetto and Ñengo Flow – 4:33

== Credits and personnel ==
- Chris Brown – lead vocals
- Kevin McCall – songwriter, producer, featured vocals
- Brian Springer – audio mixing
- Anthony Taglianett – assistant audio mixing
- Michael Stevenson – songwriter, featured vocals

Credits adapted from the liner notes for F.A.M.E.

== Charts ==
=== Weekly charts ===
Weekly chart performance for "Deuces"
Chart (2010–2011)	Peak position
Belgium (Ultratip Bubbling Under Wallonia)	21
New Zealand (Recorded Music NZ)	23
UK Hip Hop/R&B (Official Charts)	14
UK Singles (Official Charts)	68
US Billboard Hot 100	14
US Adult R&B Songs (Billboard)	38
US Hot R&B/Hip-Hop Songs (Billboard)	1
US Latin Rhythm Airplay (Billboard)	25
US Rhythmic Airplay (Billboard)	4

=== Year-end charts ===
2010 year-end chart performance for "Deuces"
Chart (2010)	Rank
US Billboard Hot 100	68
US Hot R&B/Hip-Hop Songs	9
US Rhythmic Songs	36

2011 year-end chart performance for "Deuces"
Chart (2011)	Rank
US Hot R&B/Hip-Hop Songs	44

=== Decade-end charts ===
Decade-end chart performance for "Deuces"
Chart (2010–2019)	Position
US Hot R&B/Hip-Hop Songs (Billboard)	35

== Certifications ==
Certifications for "Deuces"
Region	Certification	Certified units/sales
New Zealand (RMNZ)	2× Platinum	60,000^{‡}
United Kingdom (BPI)	Gold	400,000^{‡}
United States (RIAA)	4× Platinum	4,000,000^{‡}
^{‡} Sales+streaming figures based on certification alone.

== Release history ==
Release dates for "Deuces"
Country	Date	Format	Label
Australia	June 25, 2010	Digital download	Jive Records
Austria	June 25, 2010	Digital download	Jive Records
Belgium	June 25, 2010	Digital download	Jive Records
Canada	June 25, 2010	Digital download	Jive Records
Denmark	June 25, 2010	Digital download	Jive Records
France	June 25, 2010	Digital download	Jive Records
Germany	June 25, 2010	Digital download	Jive Records
Italy	June 25, 2010	Digital download	Jive Records
Netherlands	June 25, 2010	Digital download	Jive Records
New Zealand	June 25, 2010	Digital download	Jive Records
Sweden	June 25, 2010	Digital download	Jive Records
Switzerland	June 25, 2010	Digital download	Jive Records
United Kingdom	June 25, 2010	Digital download	Jive Records
United States	June 25, 2010	Digital download	Jive Records
Austria	November 2, 2010	Digital remix extended play	Jive Records
Belgium	November 2, 2010	Digital remix extended play	Jive Records
Canada	November 2, 2010	Digital remix extended play	Jive Records
Denmark	November 2, 2010	Digital remix extended play	Jive Records
France	November 2, 2010	Digital remix extended play	Jive Records
Germany	November 2, 2010	Digital remix extended play	Jive Records
Italy	November 2, 2010	Digital remix extended play	Jive Records
Netherlands	November 2, 2010	Digital remix extended play	Jive Records
Sweden	November 2, 2010	Digital remix extended play	Jive Records
Switzerland	November 2, 2010	Digital remix extended play	Jive Records
United States	November 2, 2010	Digital remix extended play	Jive Records

== See also ==
- List of number-one R&B singles of 2010 (U.S.)
