= 2011 Soul Train Music Awards =

Music awards ceremony in Atlanta, US

Soul Train Music Awards
- Date: November 27, 2011
- Location: Atlanta, Georgia
- Country: United States
- Hosted by: Cedric the Entertainer
- First award: 1987
- Website: soultrain.com

Television/radio coverage
- Network: BET, Centric

The 2011 Soul Train Music Awards was aired on November 27, 2011 on BET and Centric. The award ceremony was hosted by comedian and actor Cedric the Entertainer. The ceremony included special tributes to Gladys Knight and Earth Wind & Fire, both honorees received the Soul Train Legend Award. A special tribute performance was dedicated in memory of hip hop artist Heavy D, which include Doug E. Fresh, Kurtis Blow, and Whodini, Common and Naughty by Nature.

== Special awards ==
=== Legend Award – Female ===
- Gladys Knight

=== Legend Award – Male ===
- Earth Wind & Fire

== Winners and nominees ==
Winners are in bold text.

=== Album of the Year ===
- **Chris Brown – F.A.M.E.**
  - Adele – 21
  - Beyoncé – 4
  - Jay Z and Kanye West – Watch the Throne
  - Jill Scott – The Light of the Sun
  - Trey Songz – Passion, Pain & Pleasure

=== Song of the Year ===
- **Kelly Rowland (featuring Lil Wayne) – "Motivation"**
  - Adele – "Rolling in the Deep"
  - Chris Brown – "She Ain't You"
  - Miguel – "Sure Thing"
  - Jill Scott (featuring Anthony Hamilton) – "So in Love"
  - Kanye West (featuring Rihanna) – "All of the Lights"

=== The Ashford & Simpson Songwriter’s Award ===
- **Marsha Ambrosius – "Far Away"**
  - **Written by: Marsha Ambrosius and Sterling Simms**
- Adele – "Rolling in the Deep"
  - Written by: Adele and Paul Epworth
- Beyoncé – "Best Thing I Never Had"
  - Written by: Antonio Dixon, Kenneth Edmonds, Larry Griffin, Jr., Beyoncé Knowles, Caleb McCampbell, Patrick "J. Que" Smith and Shea Taylor
- Michael Jackson (featuring Akon) – "Hold My Hand"
  - Written by: Aliaune Thiam, Giorgio Tuinfort and Claude Kelly
- Raphael Saadiq – "Good Man"
  - Written by: Raphael Saadiq and Taura Stinson

=== Best R&B/Soul Male Artist ===
- **CeeLo Green**
  - Eric Benét
  - Chris Brown
  - R. Kelly
  - Trey Songz

=== Best R&B/Soul Female Artist ===
- **Jill Scott**
  - Marsha Ambrosius
  - Beyoncé
  - Mary J. Blige
  - Jennifer Hudson
  - Kelly Rowland

=== Best New Artist ===
- **Miguel**
  - Marsha Ambrosius
  - Bruno Mars
  - Frank Ocean

=== Centric Award ===
- **Raphael Saadiq**
  - Aloe Blacc
  - Bilal
  - Anthony David
  - Ledisi

=== Best Hip-Hop Song of the Year ===
- **Nicki Minaj (featuring Drake) – "Moment 4 Life"**
  - Chris Brown (featuring Lil Wayne and Busta Rhymes) – "Look at Me Now"
  - Lupe Fiasco (featuring Trey Songz) – "Out of My Head
  - Jay Z and Kanye West (featuring Otis Redding) – "Otis"
  - Kanye West (featuring Rihanna) – "All of the Lights"

=== Best Gospel Performance ===
- **Mary Mary – "Walking"**
  - James Fortune (featuring Shawn McLemore) – "I Believe"
  - Kirk Franklin – "I Smile"
  - Trin-i-tee 5:7 – "Heaven Hear My Heart"
  - CeCe Winans – "More"

=== Best Dance Performance ===
- **Beyoncé – "Run the World (Girls)"**
  - Chris Brown – "She Ain't You"
  - Keri Hilson – "Pretty Girl Rock"
  - Mary Mary – "Walking"
  - Rihanna (featuring Drake) – "What's My Name?"
  - Kelly Rowland (featuring Lil Wayne) – "Motivation"

=== CENTRICTV.com Awards ===
==== Best Soul Site ====
- **Necole Bitchie**

==== Best Caribbean Performance ====
- **Rihanna – "Man Down"**
  - Vybz Kartel – "Summertime"
  - Kes – "Wotless"
  - Mavado – "Dililah"
  - Machel Montano – "Bend Over"

==== Best Traditional Jazz Artist/Group ====
- **Cassandra Wilson – Silver Pony**
  - Terri Lyne Carrington – The Mosaic Project
  - Kevin Eubanks – Zen Food
  - The Marsalis Family – Music Redeems
  - Lizz Wright – Fellowship

==== Best Contemporary Jazz Artist/Group ====
- **Dave Koz – Hello Tomorrow**
  - Boney James – Contact
  - Foreplay – Let's Touch the Sky
  - Michael Franks – Time Together
  - Paul Hardcastle – Hardcastle IV

== Performers ==
- The Original 7ven
- Melanie Fiona
- Miguel
- Mindless Behavior
- Lloyd
- Gladys Knight
- Keith Sweat
- Earth, Wind & Fire
- Anthony Hamilton
- BeBe Winans

=== Tribute performers ===
Heavy D Tribute

- Doug E. Fresh
- Common
- Kurtis Blow
- Naughty by Nature
- Big Daddy Kane
- Whodini

Earth Wind & Fire Tribute

- Zap Mama
- Miguel
- Musiq Soulchild
- Lalah Hathaway
- Boney James
- Eric Benét
- Joe
- Robin Thicke
- CeeLo Green
- Stokley Williams

Gladys Knight Tribute

- Tamar Braxton
- Dave Hollister
- Kenny Lattimore
- Freddie Jackson
- Chrisette Michelle
- Marsha Ambrosius
- Mary Mary
- Natalie Cole

== Telecast ==
The Soul Train Awards were aired on BET and Centric on November 27, 2011.
