= Yeah 3x =

2010 single by Chris Brown

Single by Chris Brown

from the album F.A.M.E.
- Released: October 25, 2010
- Recorded: 2010
- Studio: The Record Plant (Los Angeles, California)
- Genre: Dance-pop; Europop; electro house
- Length: 4:01
- Label: Jive
- Songwriters: Chris Brown; Justin Franks; Kevin McCall; Amber Streeter; Adam Wiles
- Producer: DJ Frank E

Chris Brown singles chronology
"Make a Movie" (2010)	"Yeah 3x" (2010)	"Get Back Up" (2010)

Music video
- "Yeah 3x" on YouTube

"Yeah 3x" (pronounced "Yeah three times", "Yeah Yeah Yeah", or "Yeah three-x"; sometimes stylized as "Yeah 3X") is a song by American singer Chris Brown, released as the lead single from his fourth studio album F.A.M.E. on October 25, 2010. It was written alongside Kevin McCall, Sevyn Streeter, and producer DJ Frank E, with Calvin Harris receiving an additional writing credit following his accusation of plagiarism. Brown recorded the song for his pop audience as he had been doing a lot of mixtapes and urban records. "Yeah 3x" is an uptempo dance-pop, Europop, and electro house song; it uses a video game-type beat and features a thick bassline and big synth chords.

"Yeah 3x" peaked at number fifteen on the Billboard Hot 100 chart, and at number seven on the Mainstream Top 40 chart. Outside of the United States, "Yeah 3x" peaked within the top ten of the charts in Australia, Austria, Belgium (Flanders), Denmark, Germany, Hungary, Netherlands, New Zealand, the Republic of Ireland, Switzerland, and the United Kingdom. It also peaked within the top 20 of the charts in Canada, Norway, Slovakia, and Sweden.

An accompanying music video was directed by Colin Tilley and filmed at Universal Studios. The video features Brown in various dance sequences in a neighborhood of old time storefronts and brownstones. It also features cameo appearances by Teyana Taylor, Kevin McCall, and Future Funk from America's Got Talent. Brown promoted the song with live performances on televised shows, including Dancing with the Stars, Today and the 2011 MTV Video Music Awards. It was also included on the set list of his 2011 F.A.M.E. Tour.

== Background and recording ==
"Yeah 3x" was recorded at The Record Plant—a studio in Los Angeles, California—and Serban Ghenea mixed the track at Mixstar Studios—a studio in Virginia Beach, Virginia. On September 2, 2010, Brown tweeted that the Polow da Don-produced song titled "Calypso" would be released soon as the follow-up single to "Deuces" (2010). However, those plans were changed when "Yeah 3x" was released instead. While filming the music video for the song, Brown elaborated on the song's inspiration in an interview with Access Hollywood. He stated that he wanted to record the song for his pop audience since he had been doing so much urban material.

Brown said the song was given to him by DJ Frank E while he was in the studio writing songs for other artists and himself. "I heard the track and I was like man this is incredible. It kind of gave me the 'Forever' feeling so I wanted to do more of a song for my pop audience. I've been doing a lot of mix-tape stuff, a lot of urban records ... the pop audience didn't really have anything to gauge from so I really wanted to give them this and I feel like 'Yeah 3x' is something different, something new and it's just [a] positive record. It's not anything too over the top; it's just right where it needs to be." During a chat with fans on Ustream.tv on September 27, 2010, Brown said that the song was written in 15 minutes; "We actually got the beat and we did it in no time. It was effortless. It was fun. It was sort of like when we wrote 'Forever', so I hope you guys like that record. It's more of a pop record, in the club record."

== Composition ==
Yeah 3x
A 24-second sample of the chorus of "Yeah 3x", featuring a thick bassline and video game-type beats.

"Yeah 3x" is an uptempo dance-pop, Europop, and electro house song. According to MTV, "Yeah 3x" shows Brown "embracing his pop side" over a "video game-type beat". Throughout the song, it features a thick bassline. "Yeah 3x" is set in common time with a moderate dance tempo of 130 beats per minute. It is composed in the key of D major with Brown's vocal range spanning from the note of A_{3} to the note of B_{4}. The song uses a portion of the melody from "I'm Not Alone" by Calvin Harris. According to Robbie Daw of Idolator, "Yeah 3x" is a mixture of "Forever" (2008) and La Roux's "Bulletproof" (2009), while Sean Michaels of The Guardian commented that the song seems to be inspired by David Guetta's Eurodance sound. Nick Levine of Digital Spy musically compared the song's production to the sounds of Usher, Taio Cruz, Jay Sean, The Black Eyed Peas and Calvin Harris.

== Music video ==
=== Synopsis ===
The accompanying music video for "Yeah 3x" was directed by Colin Tilley and filmed at the Universal Studios. It premiered on MTV on October 21, 2010, and features cameo appearances by Teyana Taylor, Kevin McCall, and Future Funk from America's Got Talent. The video opens with Brown walking down a deserted street wearing a navy sweatshirt, dark blue denim, and white sneakers. It then cuts to another scene where Brown makes an acrobatic entrance onto the top of a truck in a neighborhood of old-timey storefronts and brownstones. Wearing a black vest, trousers and a red skinny tie, Brown then leads a mob of kids, teenagers and older residents down the street. As the first chorus nears, Brown begins his first dance sequence with two male dancers. Together, they pull off high mid-air twirls, each seemingly jumping several feet above the ground. Brown then follows a woman down the street, and runs into four female dancers wearing tank tops and suspenders. Together, they perform arm movements, and work in a few hip thrusts. The next scene, Brown is seen at a storefront labeled "Popin Pete's" and continues more dancing with Pete. During the bridge, Brown can be seen wearing a hot pink/salmon-colored blazer, gold chain and, in one shot, carrying a massive shiny boombox. Brown then rallies the crowd from a fire escape just before someone opens a fire hydrant and unleashes a spray of water onto the crowd. In the final scene, Brown is wearing a peach blazer while baring his chest, and performs the last bit of choreography with male and female dancers. The video ends as Brown spins, stops and looks off into the distance.

=== Reception ===
Ed Easton Jr. of WNOW-FM gave the video a rating of seven out of ten, writing that, "there is plenty of choreographed dancing as Breezy shows us he still got it, getting everyone in the neighborhood to dance with him. The video is good for the most part, especially if you are a fan of dancing." Brad Wete of Entertainment Weekly wrote that, "it's genuinely a fun clip, absent of any overdone, sexed up R&B corniness." Robbie Daw of Idolator compared the video to Michael Jackson's "The Way You Make Me Feel" (1987), and Janet Jackson's "Alright" (1990), concluding that "sure, the 'Yeah 3x' clip is derivative. But at least Brown is making a serious effort to polish up his commercial appeal once again with both a feel-good, sing-along song and an equally sunny video." Mariel Concepcion of Billboard magazine simply called it a "kid-friendly clip". The video was nominated for Best Choreography at the 2012 MTV Video Music Awards Japan.

== Live performances ==
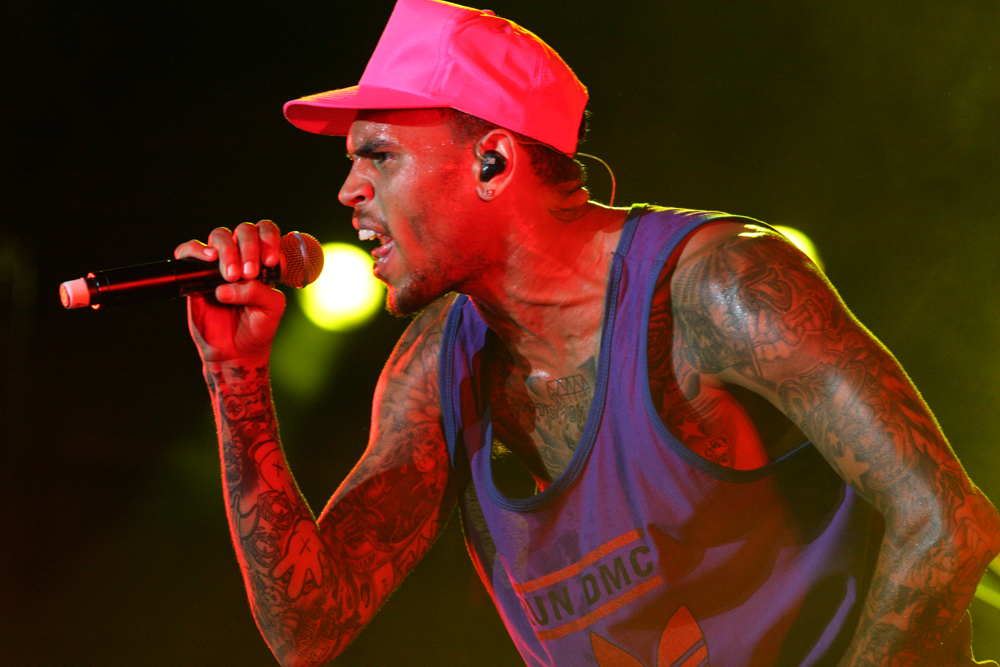
Brown performing at Supafest in April 2012

A pre-taped performance of Brown performing "Yeah 3x" and a medley of "Beautiful People" and "Forever" was shown on the American version of Dancing with the Stars on March 29, 2011. Prior to the performance, some of the show's cast were unhappy that Brown was going to perform because of the domestic violence assault that occurred with his then-girlfriend Rihanna in 2009. Host Tom Bergeron told the On Air with Ryan Seacrest radio show that, "I did tell the producers it may be to their advantage to not have me interview him, because my natural tendency would be to say something. So don't put me in a position where you are asking me to not say something, because I really won't do that."

On July 15, 2011, Brown performed the song in front of an audience of 18,000 at the Rockefeller Plaza in New York City for the Today concert series. For the performance, Brown wore a white shirt and black pants, and was accompanied by male dancers wearing black jumpsuits and red sneakers. On August 28, 2011, Brown performed a medley of "Beautiful People" and "Yeah 3x" at the 2011 MTV Video Music Awards. He opened his performance with "Yeah 3x" and was dressed in a white formal suit, accompanied by "full-skirted dancers". Brown was eventually joined onstage by tuxedo-clad dancers and began dancing to the 1993 Wu-Tang Clan single "Protect Ya Neck". His dance routine then moved into 1991, where he danced to Nirvana's "Smells Like Teen Spirit". Brown's performance then came back to the future, where he began to sing "Beautiful People". While performing the song, he was suspended in the air, and then lowered to another stage where he continued to perform the song. Brown then went back in the air, where he did splits and back-flips. "Yeah 3x" was added to the set list of Brown's 2011 F.A.M.E. Tour in Australia and North America, and at the Supafest tour in April 2012.

== Critical reception ==
Amar Toor of AOL Radio called the song "dance-friendly", and wrote "with its electro-vibe and frenetic pulse, 'Yeah 3x' sounds like the perfect club banging anthem to get any night off to a raucous start." Ed Easton Jr. of radio station WNOW-FM noted the song's similarities to Brown's 2008 single "Forever" (2008), writing that "it has that fun and simple lyrical flow and puts more emphasis on the intoxicating beat." He also called the song "a beat banging dance track" that would keep Brown rising back to the top. Megan Vick of Billboard magazine added that "Brown's career has had its share of twists and turns, but 'Yeah 3x' proves he can still turn out a speaker-bumping track." Bri LaPelusa of UR Chicago called it a "true party anthem" due to the chorus: "You love to drink / So do we / Get my bottles / Bring 'em to me / Hold your glasses up / People everywhere." Tom Howard of Yahoo! Music called it a "clubby summer tune." Hannah Ash of The Harber Herald wrote that "it's a great song, full of party-riffic electronic beats made for dancing."

=== Controversy ===
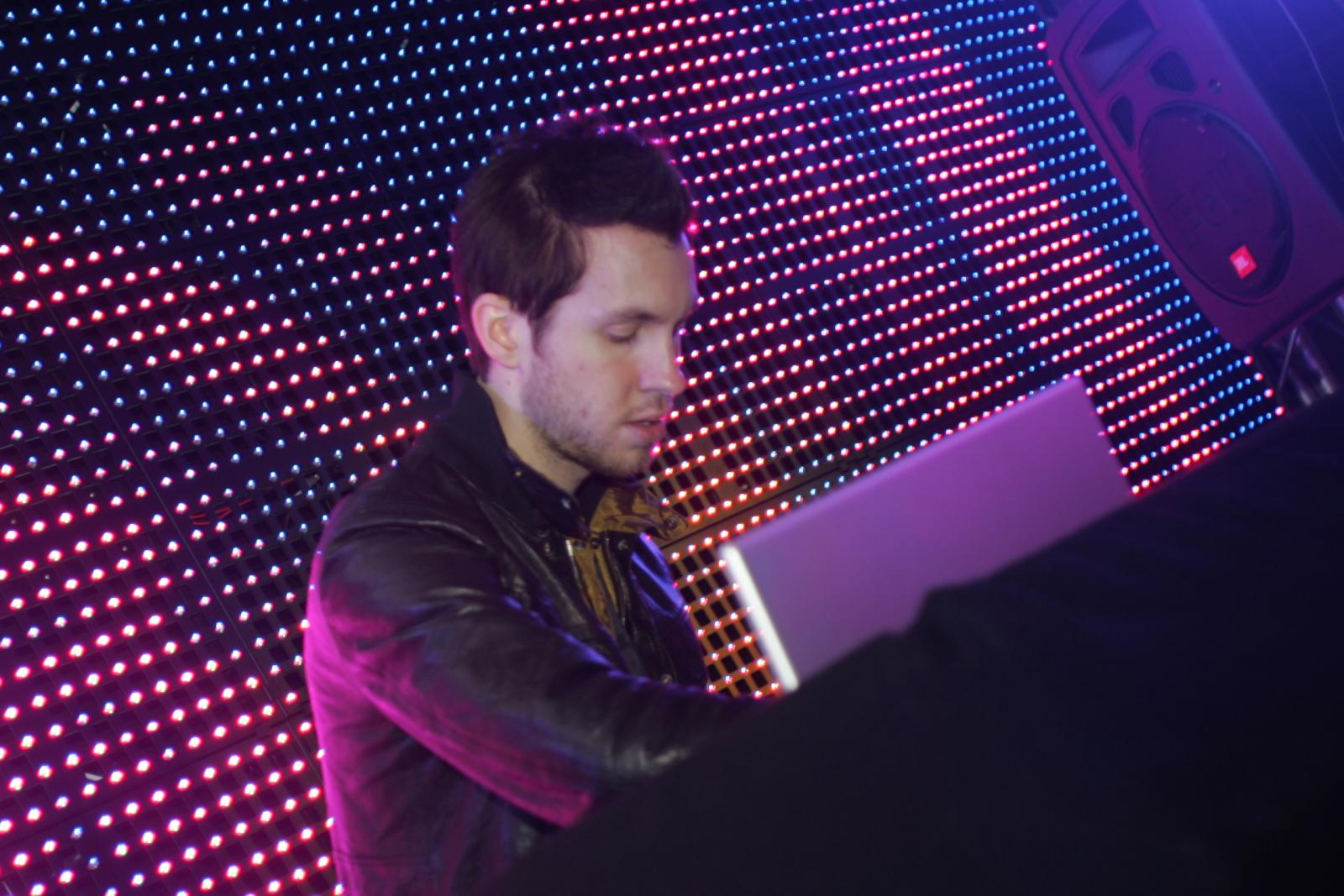
Calvin Harris claimed that "Yeah 3x" plagiarised his 2009 single "I'm Not Alone".

Scottish producer and DJ Calvin Harris claimed that "Yeah 3x" plagiarised his 2009 single "I'm Not Alone". He tweeted, "Choked on my cornflakes when I heard [the] new Chris Brown single this morning. Do you know what I mean?" After receiving many abusive messages from Brown's fans after posting the comment, he later tweeted, "I don't care that you call me a nobody. Stealing is still stealing, doesn't matter who you are! ... Because Chris Brown is an international celebrity doesn't make it OK to rip off a guy from [the] UK not many people have heard of."

When asked in an interview with Australia's Herald Sun if Brown knew him, Harris replied, "Well, he's never heard of me, that's the funniest thing. But the producer he's worked with, DJ Frank E, has definitely heard of me. He's a respected producer, he's worked with Tiësto on a few tracks, perhaps that's where the link is. It's all a bit of fun." Brown later spoke with Harris and upon hearing the similarities between the two songs, had Harris' name added to the songwriting credits.

== Chart performance ==
In the United States, "Yeah 3x" debuted at number 33 on the Billboard Hot 100 chart dated November 13, 2010. After weeks of ascending and descending the Hot 100, "Yeah 3x" peaked at number 15 in the issue dated January 29, 2011, and spent 20 weeks on the chart. The song charted successfully on the US Pop Songs chart at number seven. "Yeah 3x" failed to chart on the US Hot R&B/Hip-Hop Songs chart, instead reaching number 22 on the Bubbling Under R&B/Hip-Hop Singles chart, which lists the 25 songs below the Hot R&B/Hip-Hop Songs' number 100 position. On October 3, 2017, the single was certified double platinum by the Recording Industry Association of America (RIAA) for combined sales and streaming equivalent units of over two million units in the United States. In Canada, "Yeah 3x" debuted at number 42 on the Canadian Hot 100 and peaked at number twelve.

Internationally, "Yeah 3x" reached the top 10 in nine countries. On the Australian Singles Chart, "Yeah 3x" debuted at number seven on November 29, 2010, and peaked at number four on December 27, 2010. The song was certified five times platinum by the Australian Recording Industry Association (ARIA), denoting sales of 350,000 copies. In Belgium, "Yeah 3x" peaked at number eight on the Flanders Ultratop 50, where it remained in the top 10 for four non-consecutive weeks. In Denmark, the song debuted at number six on the Danish Singles Chart, giving Brown his second top 10 single in that country, following "No Air" (2008), a duet with Jordin Sparks. The song also attained top 10 positions on the German Singles Chart and the Netherlands' Dutch Top 40 at numbers seven 10, respectively. "Yeah 3x" was certified gold by the Bundesverband Musikindustrie (BVMI) in Germany, denoting sales of 150,000 copies. In New Zealand, "Yeah 3x" reached number one on January 10, 2011, where it remained for one week, and became Brown's sixth number-one single in the country. It was certified platinum by the Recording Industry Association of New Zealand (RIANZ), denoting sales of 15,000 copies. In Switzerland, the song debuted at number 51 on the Swiss Singles Chart on February 13, 2011, and peaked at number seven on April 10, 2011. It was certified gold by the International Federation of the Phonographic Industry (IFPI), denoting sales of 15,000 copies. In Ireland, "Yeah 3x" peaked at number eight on the Irish Singles Chart and spent 22 weeks on the chart. In the United Kingdom, "Yeah 3x" entered the UK Singles Chart at number 10 on February 5, 2011, and became Brown's fourth UK top 10 single as a lead artist. It peaked at number six in its third week on the chart, and remained in the top 10 for six consecutive weeks.

== Track listing ==
- Digital download
1. "Yeah 3x" – 4:01
- German CD single
1. "Yeah 3x" – 4:01
2. "Deuces" featuring Drake and Kanye West (Remix) – 4:34
- Australian and New Zealand Digital EP
1. "Yeah 3x" – 4:01
2. "Deuces" featuring Drake, T.I., Kanye West, Fabolous, Rick Ross and André 3000 (Remix) – 6:43
3. "Deuces" featuring Drake and Kanye West (Remix) – 4:34

== Credits and personnel ==
- Chris Brown – songwriter, lead vocals
- Justin "DJ Frank E" Franks – songwriter, producer
- Kevin McCall – songwriter
- Amber Streeter – songwriter
- Calvin Harris – songwriter
- Serban Ghenea – audio mixing
- John Hanes – engineering
- Tim Roberts – assistant engineering

== Charts ==
=== Weekly charts ===
Weekly chart performance for "Yeah 3x"
Chart (2010–2011)	Peak position
Australia (ARIA)	4
Austria (Ö3 Austria Top 40)	10
Belgium (Ultratop 50 Flanders)	8
Belgium (Ultratop 50 Wallonia)	12
Canada Hot 100 (Billboard)	12
Denmark (Tracklisten)	6
France (SNEP)	59
Germany (GfK)	7
Hungary (Rádiós Top 40)	8
Ireland (IRMA)	8
Italy (FIMI)	55
Japan Hot 100 (Billboard)	40
Netherlands (Dutch Top 40)	10
Netherlands (Single Top 100)	22
New Zealand (Recorded Music NZ)	1
Norway (VG-lista)	11
Scottish Singles Sales (Official Charts)	5
Slovakia Airplay (ČNS IFPI)	12
Sweden (Sverigetopplistan)	12
Switzerland (Schweizer Hitparade)	7
UK Singles (Official Charts)	6
US Billboard Hot 100	15
US Adult Pop Airplay (Billboard)	33
US Dance Airplay (Billboard)	7
US Dance Club Songs (Billboard)	30
US Pop Airplay (Billboard)	7
US Rhythmic Airplay (Billboard)	5

=== Year-end charts ===
2010 year-end chart performance for "Yeah 3x"
Chart (2010)	Position
Australia (ARIA)	55

2011 year-end chart performance for "Yeah 3x"
Chart (2011)	Position
Australia (ARIA)	30
Austria (Ö3 Austria Top 40)	46
Belgium (Ultratop Flanders)	36
Belgium (Ultratop Wallonia)	56
Canada (Canadian Hot 100)	44
Germany (Official German Charts)	34
Hungary (Rádiós Top 40)	25
Netherlands (Dutch Top 40)	62
Netherlands (Single Top 100)	64
New Zealand (Recorded Music NZ)	34
Sweden (Sverigetopplistan)	62
Switzerland (Schweizer Hitparade)	51
UK Singles (OCC)	28
US Billboard Hot 100	49
US Dance/Mix Show Airplay (Billboard)	40
US Mainstream Top 40 (Billboard)	36
US Rhythmic (Billboard)	26

== Certifications ==
Certifications for "Yeah 3x"
Region	Certification	Certified units/sales
Australia (ARIA)	6× Platinum	420,000^{‡}
Austria (IFPI Austria)	Gold	15,000^{*}
Belgium (BRMA)	Gold	15,000^{*}
Denmark (IFPI Danmark)	Gold	15,000^{^}
Germany (BVMI)	Gold	150,000^{^}
Japan (RIAJ)	Gold	100,000^{*}
New Zealand (RMNZ)	Platinum	15,000^{*}
Norway (IFPI Norway)	5× Platinum	50,000^{*}
Sweden (GLF)	2× Platinum	80,000^{‡}
Switzerland (IFPI Switzerland)	Platinum	30,000^{^}
United Kingdom (BPI)	Platinum	600,000^{‡}
United States (RIAA)	3× Platinum	3,000,000^{‡}
Streaming
Denmark (IFPI Danmark)	Gold	50,000^{†}
^{*} Sales figures based on certification alone.^{^} Shipments figures based on certification alone.^{‡} Sales+streaming figures based on certification alone.^{†} Streaming-only figures based on certification alone.

== Radio and release history ==
Country	Date	Format
United States	October 25, 2010	Digital download
Canada	October 25, 2010	Digital download
Finland	October 25, 2010	Digital download
France	October 25, 2010	Digital download
Norway	October 25, 2010	Digital download
Sweden	October 25, 2010	Digital download
United States	October 26, 2010	Rhythmic contemporary radio
Australia	November 15, 2010	Digital download
New Zealand	November 15, 2010	Digital download
Australia	December 17, 2010	Digital remix extended play
New Zealand	December 17, 2010	Digital remix extended play
Belgium	January 10, 2011	Digital download
Netherlands	January 10, 2011	Digital download
Ireland	January 21, 2011	Digital download
United Kingdom	January 23, 2011	Digital download
Switzerland	January 28, 2011	Digital download
Austria	February 25, 2011	Digital download
Germany	March 4, 2011	CD single

== See also ==
- List of number-one singles from the 2010s (New Zealand)
- List of top 10 singles in 2010 (Australia)
