= F.A.M.E. (Chris Brown album) =

- Standard cover. Deluxe cover features green and white letters.

Studio album by Chris Brown
- Released: March 22, 2011
- Recorded: 2010–11
- Studios: The Record Plant (Los Angeles, California); In Your Ear Studio (Richmond, Virginia); Mason Sound (North Hollywood, California); Stadium Red (New York City); Westlake Recording Studios (West Hollywood, California)
- Genres: R&B; hip-hop; pop
- Length: 53:53
- Labels: Jive; CBE
- Producers: Alle Benassi; Afrojack; Brian Kennedy; Bigg D; Benny Benassi; DJ Frank E; Diplo; Ra Charm; tha Bizness; the Messengers; the Stereotypes; the Underdogs; Timbaland; Timothy Bloom; T-Wiz

Chris Brown chronology
Graffiti (2009)	F.A.M.E. (2011)	Fortune (2012)

Singles from F.A.M.E.
- 1. "Yeah 3x" Released: October 25, 2010; 2. "Look At Me Now" Released: February 1, 2011; 3. "Beautiful People" Released: March 11, 2011; 4. "She Ain't You" Released: March 28, 2011; 5. "Next to You" Released: June 24, 2011; 6. "Wet the Bed" Released: September 13, 2011

F.A.M.E. (backronym of Forgiving All My Enemies) is the fourth studio album by American singer Chris Brown. It was released on March 22, 2011, through Jive Records. The album serves as the follow-up to his third album Graffiti (2009), and also marks his last album with Jive Records.

On F.A.M.E., Brown worked with several record producers and songwriters, including Kevin McCall, H Money, Timbaland, The Underdogs, Diplo and Benny Benassi among others. The album features guest appearances from Lil Wayne, Ludacris, Busta Rhymes, Wiz Khalifa, The Game, Justin Bieber and Big Sean, among others. It was supported by eight singles, "Deuces" featuring Tyga and Kevin McCall, "No BS", "Yeah 3x", "Look at Me Now" featuring Lil Wayne and Busta Rhymes, "Beautiful People" featuring Benny Benassi, "She Ain't You", "Next to You" featuring Justin Bieber, and "Wet the Bed" featuring Ludacris. F.A.M.E. was anticipated by three mixtapes: In My Zone, Fan of a Fan, and In My Zone 2. The album's aesthetics feature multicolored pop-art graffiti imagery conceived by Brown himself, Courtney Walter, and American contemporary artist Ron English.

F.A.M.E. shows a wide variety of musical genres including R&B, pop, hip hop, dancehall, soft rock and Europop, while the lyrical content concentrates on finding the uplifting aspects of life. It is broadly regarded as the album that shaped Brown's musical style and persona. F.A.M.E. received mixed reviews from music critics, who generally praised the production and Brown's performances, while the content was subject of criticism. The album received three Grammy Award nominations at the 54th Grammy Awards, winning Best R&B Album, which was Brown's first Grammy Award. It also won Top R&B Album at the 2012 Billboard Music Awards and Album of the Year at the 2011 Soul Train Music Awards.

F.A.M.E. debuted at number one on the US Billboard 200, with first-week sales of 270,000 copies. It was Brown's first number-one album in the United States and his fourth consecutive top ten album following Graffiti. "Yeah 3x", "Look at Me Now" and "Beautiful People" were commercially successful worldwide. In the United States, "Look at Me Now" topped both the Hot R&B/Hip-Hop Songs and Hot Rap Songs charts, becoming the best-selling rap song of 2011 and one of the highest-certified digital singles in the country. F.A.M.E. is certified triple platinum by the Recording Industry Association of America (RIAA), which makes this Brown's third multi-platinum selling album following Exclusive (2007). To support the release of the album, Brown embarked on his F.A.M.E. Tour in Australia and North America.

== Background and recording ==
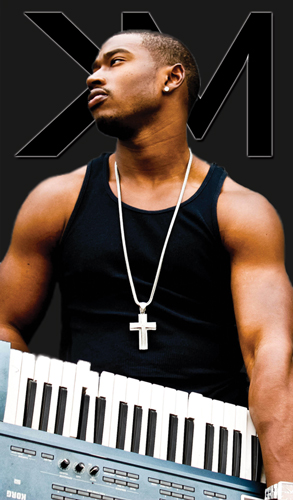
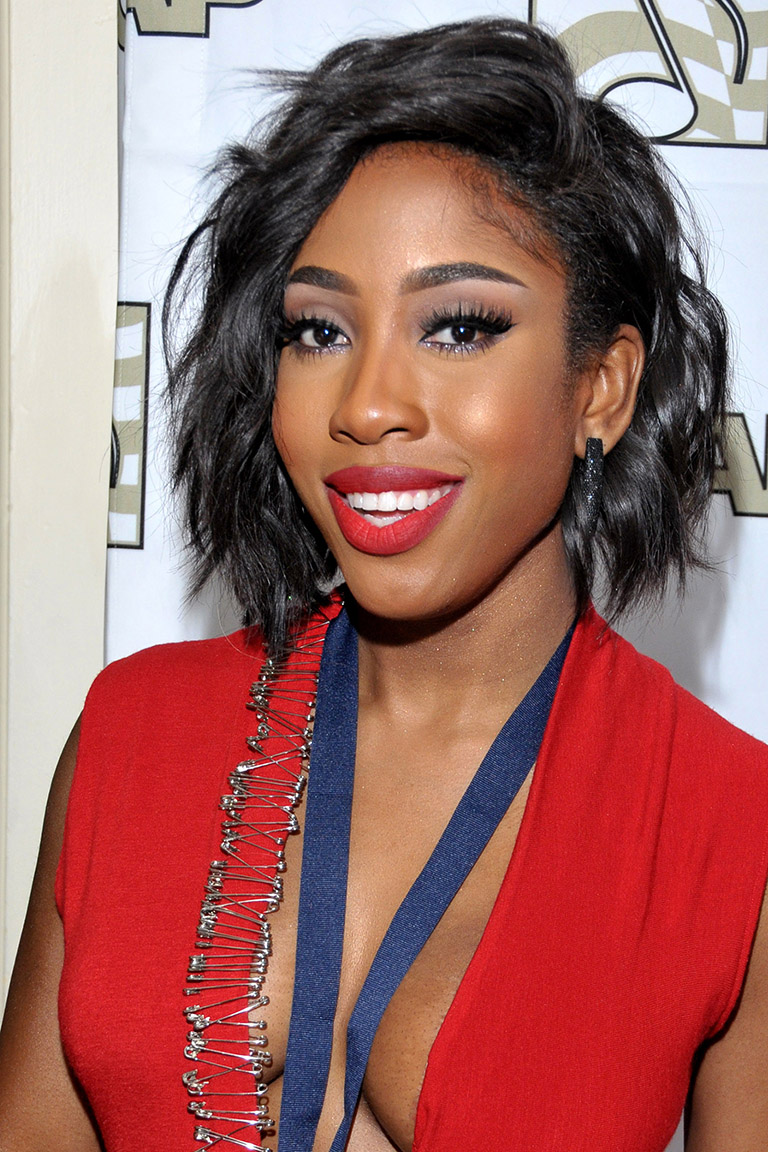
Kevin McCall, (left) and Sevyn Streeter (right) contributed notably to the album's creation.

Brown's third studio album, Graffiti, was released in December 2009, shortly after the domestic violence scandal involving him and his ex-girlfriend, Rihanna. The album was considered a critical and commercial failure compared to his previous works. In 2010, following the release of Graffiti, Brown composed and released three mixtapes for free: In My Zone (Rhythm & Streets), Fan of a Fan (a collaborative mixtape with rapper Tyga), and In My Zone 2. These mixtapes showcased a new writing style for the singer, addressing edgier themes and featuring a different musical style that mixed R&B with hip hop. For these projects, he began working with new producers, most notably Kevin McCall.

Brown told The Guardian in a 2013 interview that during that period he was having “one of the most troubling times in [his] life” because he felt “the hatred from more adult people,” which he struggled to comprehend at the time, given the emotional turmoil he was experiencing. The singer said he channeled the challenges he faced into determination, recalling that at the time he thought: “I'm going to come back, I know the music that I'm doing, how hard I work, is not just for nothing”. He found himself writing several songs every night, “just out of pure… I wouldn't say heartbreak, but just pure ambition. To prove people wrong”. In his 2017 self-documentary, Welcome to My Life, Brown stated that most of the songs he made for F.A.M.E. were “elevating and transcending life, instead of the negative that was in [his] life”. The singer said in a 2023 interview on Club Shay Shay that while the work on his previous albums was a learning experience, F.A.M.E. marked a turning point in his recording process: "I was kinda like in my zone. I knew what I wanted."

Originally, Brown wanted the album to be a double-disc, consisting of 25 to 30 tracks. However, the record company was opposed to that, so he cut down the project to 13 tracks for the standard version, extending it to 19 songs in the most expanded deluxe edition of the record. On September 18, 2010, Brown announced the title to the album; F.A.M.E. Brown supplied a backronym for the title: "Forgiving All My Enemies", and he has also referred to it as "Fans Are My Everything".

Prior to its release, the artists that were listed for working with Brown on F.A.M.E. were Kevin McCall, Timbaland, Justin Bieber, Bruno Mars, Wiz Khalifa, Asher Roth and Game. In describing the album, Brown said,

On this album some of the songs are more grown-up. There are songs from [numerous] genres: from street records to others that are real soul, 808 heavy that you'll hear in the club, and then others are strictly for the heart; songs that your mom and grandma can listen to and love. Collectively, 'F.A.M.E.' is me giving fans every aspect of who I am as far as my art, my culture, and my concepts."

== Composition ==
"Deuces"
A sample of "Deuces", the album's opener.

"Oh My Love"
A sample of "Oh My Love", showcasing the multitude of genres on F.A.M.E..

F.A.M.E. showcases a diverse range of styles, containing songs from many genres, including R&B, pop, hip hop, dancehall, soft rock and Europop. Critics praised its sound for maintaining a cohesive identity, even amidst its diverse musical landscape. The lyrical content concentrates on finding positivity in life through genuineness, romantic love, desire, self-assurance, sex and light-hearted pleasure. F.A.M.E. is considered Brown's album that defined his musical style and persona.

Brown's vocal performances on the album primarily showcase his R&B singing, characterized by harmonization and melisma. Critics praised the vocal performances for being 'variegated,' predominantly highlighting his natural timbre while also noting sporadic use of autotune. On F.A.M.E., the singer occasionally raps, marking his first studio album to feature this type of performance by Brown.

The opening track, "Deuces", which features Kevin McCall and Tyga, is a slow, downtempo alternative R&B track that starts off the album telling "a bitter male point of view of his failed relationship", where the artists affirm that they moved on to a better moment in their life, reminiscing the pain caused by their past lover. Joanne Dorken of MTV UK noted that the song shows off Brown's "well-harmonized smooth vocals". The following tracks of F.A.M.E. showcase a more uplifting mood. "Up 2 You" is an R&B ballad, which follows on from the break-up theme. The song was likened to the musical styles of Bobby Brown and Usher. "Next to You", featuring Justin Bieber, is a "thumping mid-tempo pop&B track". In the song, they both sing about their love for a girl. Sarah Rodman from The Boston Globe wrote that the song "offers one of Brown's most tender vocals to date". The third track, "No Bullshit", is an R&B slow-jam, which features sexual content and a "classic 90's feel", with its instrumental combining percussion instruments, piano chords and a tenor flute.

The album's up-tempo songs, "Yeah 3x", and the closing track "Beautiful People", both feature house and Europop influences. "Yeah 3x" was compared to Brown's single "Forever" (2008), and was likened to the musical styles of The Black Eyed Peas, Usher and Jay Sean, while "Beautiful People" was noted for its progressive house and dancehall influences. Its lyrics encourage a positive view of life. The fourth track, "Look at Me Now", which features American rappers Lil Wayne and Busta Rhymes, is a braggadocious "dirty south" hip hop song, featuring "fast-rapping" from Brown, Lil Wayne and Busta Rhymes. The song was musically compared to Soulja Boy's work and Cali Swag District's "Teach Me How to Dougie" (2010). The fifth track, "She Ain't You", is an R&B mid-tempo, with Brown paying tribute to his biggest inspiration, Michael Jackson. It samples Jackson's single "Human Nature" (1983) and SWV's "Right Here" (1993). "Should've Kissed You", is a "pop&B" ballad about the indecision of giving an overthought first kiss to the loved one. The ninth track, "All Back", is a soft rock ballad that features "raw vocals and prominent guitar". It was musically compared to Ryan Tedder's work. Brown revisits his rapping skills on the alternative hip-hop tracks "Say It With Me" and "Oh My Love", that both feature influences from disco in their choruses, and from rock in their productions. "Bomb", which features Wiz Khalifa, is a dancehall-rap track, and was musically compared to Beenie Man's work. The closing track of the deluxe edition, "Beg for It", is an R&B slow-jam with sexual lyrics, inspired by early works of singer R. Kelly.

== Artwork ==
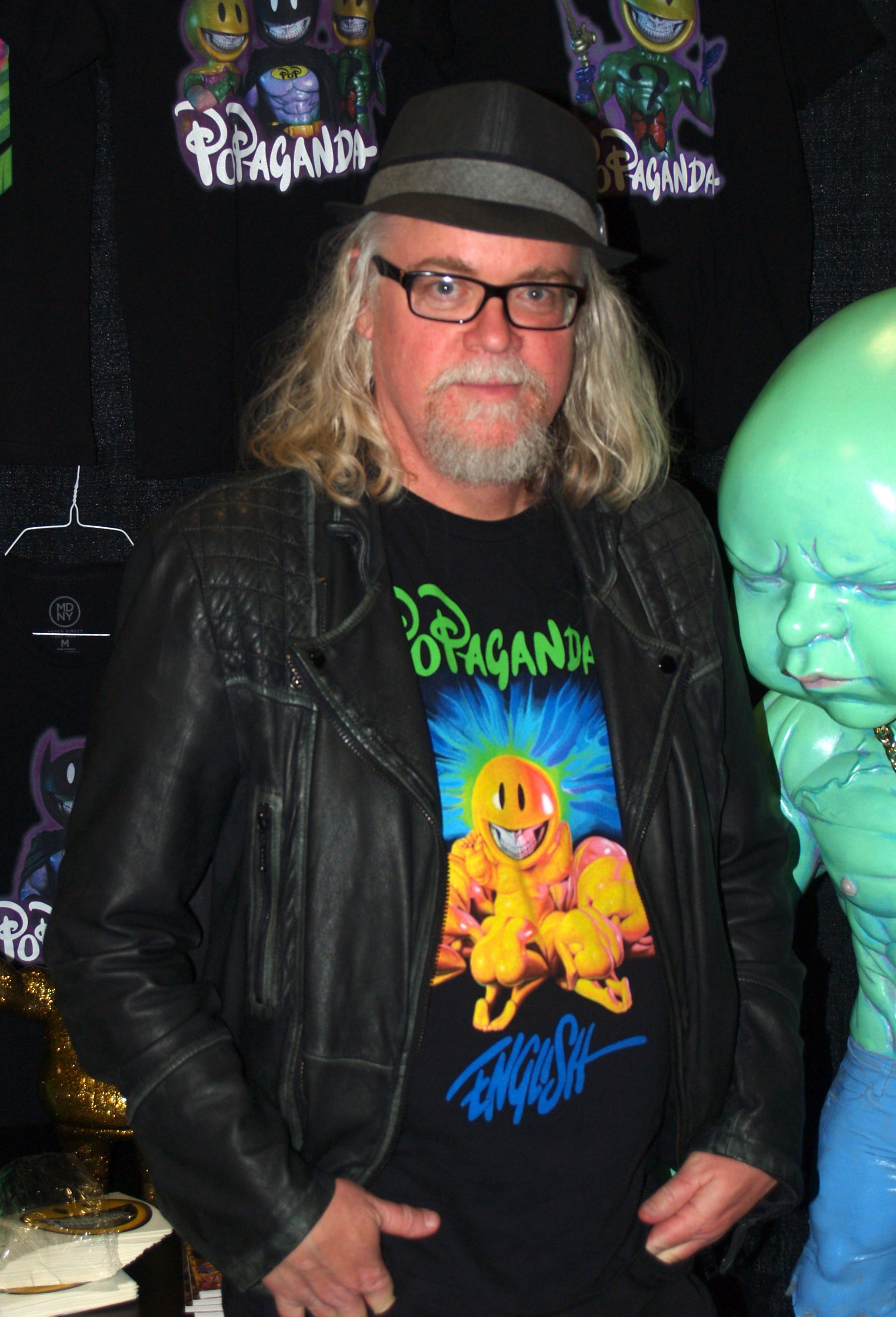
Contemporary artist Ron English, who designed the album's artwork

The album cover was designed by American contemporary artist Ron English, and it was revealed on February 14, 2011. The cover features a multi-colored, neon portrait of Brown striking a serious pose, while two identical profiles of him wearing a baseball cap and diamond earrings face opposite directions on each shoulder. Its background is composed of numerous posters, captioned with the words "Forgiving All My Enemies", that show many figures, including Brown in a stone faced pose, and a child wearing a combat helmet branded with the peace symbol (☮). The album's aesthetics were handled by Brown himself, Courtney Walter and Ron English, and feature a multicolored pop-art graffiti imagery.

== Release and promotion ==
The standard edition of the album was released simultaneously with the deluxe edition from March 22, 2011. The deluxe edition included five additional tracks.

To promote the album, Brown performed "Yeah 3x" and "No Bullshit" on Saturday Night Live on February 12, 2011. During the week leading up to the US release of the album, Brown treated fans to a series of secret listening sessions, and gave them an exclusive bonus track and music video. It was a campaign that Brown launched on behalf of his worldwide fan base, nicknamed "Team Breezy". The first listening session was held on March 14 in Los Angeles. It was then followed by consecutive sessions in Atlanta (March 15), Washington, D.C. (March 16) and New York City (March 17). Each session was held at a secret location and was hosted by Brown and the "Team Breezy" team leaders in each city.

On March 22, 2011, Brown appeared on Good Morning America to perform "Yeah 3x", and later appeared on 106 & Park, where he performed "Deuces", "Look at Me Now" and "Ain't Thinkin' 'Bout You". His Good Morning America appearance sparked controversial headlines because, following his interview with Robin Roberts at the Times Square Studios, where he was repeatedly asked about the Rihanna situation and restraining order, Brown started crying and became violent in his dressing room during a commercial break before his, later cancelled, second performance ending that day's program, and broke a window overlooking Times Square punching it. Following the incident, he apologized, saying that he was very tired of people bringing up the incident.

On March 29, 2011, a pre-taped performance of Brown performing "Yeah 3x" and a medley of "Forever" and "Beautiful People", was broadcast on Dancing with the Stars (US). On June 26, 2011, he performed "She Ain't You", "Look at Me Now" and "Paper, Scissors, Rock" live at the 2011 BET Awards. On July 15, 2011, Brown appeared on The Today Show, as part of the show's concert series, which took place at the Rockefeller Plaza in New York City. Brown performed "Yeah 3x", "I Can Transform Ya", "She Ain't You" and "Forever" at the concert. On August 28, 2011, Brown did a medley of "Yeah 3x", "Protect Ya Neck", "Smells Like Teen Spirit" and "Beautiful People" at the 2011 MTV Video Music Awards, performing a highly acclaimed choreography that included flying parts.

=== Singles ===
"Yeah 3x" was released as the album's lead single on October 25, 2010. It received positive reviews from critics, who praised its production and lyrics. The song peaked at number 15 on the US Billboard Hot 100, and number 12 on the Canadian Hot 100. It reached the top-ten on the singles charts of Australia, Austria, Denmark, Germany, Ireland, Netherlands, New Zealand, Switzerland and the United Kingdom.

"Look at Me Now", which features American rappers Lil Wayne and Busta Rhymes, was released as the album's second single on February 1, 2011. It was sent to rhythmic contemporary radio in the United States on February 8, 2011. Music critics noted "Look at Me Now" as the standout track on the album, and praised Busta Rhymes and Lil Wayne's rap verses. The song peaked at number six on the US Billboard Hot 100 chart, making it Brown's highest chart position since "Forever" (2008). It reached number one on the US Rap Songs and Hot R&B/Hip-Hop Songs charts.

"Beautiful People", featuring Benny Benassi, was released as the album's third single on March 11, 2011. The song was well received by most music critics who praised its production and lyrics. "Beautiful People" reached the top-ten in Australia, Ireland, New Zealand and the United Kingdom. In the United States, the song peaked at number one on the Billboard Hot Dance Club Songs chart, and became the first number-one single for both Brown and Benassi. "She Ain't You" was released to urban radio in the United States on March 28, 2011, as the fourth US single from F.A.M.E.. It peaked at number five on the US Hot R&B/Hip-Hop Songs chart, number 17 on the US Pop Songs chart, and number 27 on the US Billboard Hot 100 chart.

"Next to You", which features Canadian recording artist Justin Bieber, was released as the fourth international single on June 24, 2011. Most music critics positively reviewed the song, complimenting the blending of Brown and Bieber's vocals. The song reached the top-twenty in Austria, New Zealand and the United Kingdom, and the top-thirty in Australia, Germany, Ireland and the United States.

"Wet the Bed", which features American rapper Ludacris, was sent to US urban radio on September 13, 2011, as the album's fifth US single. It peaked at number six on the US Hot R&B/Hip-Hop Songs chart and number 77 on the US Billboard Hot 100 chart.

=== Tour ===
Brown embarked on his F.A.M.E. Tour in April 2011 in Australia. Jessica Mauboy, Havana Brown, and Justice Crew, served as the supporting acts on all dates of the Australian leg. 32 show dates in North America were later added to the tour, which began in September 2011. Kelly Rowland, T-Pain, Bow Wow and Tyga served as the opening acts of the North American leg.

== Critical reception ==
Professional ratings
Aggregate scores
Source	Rating
Metacritic	52/100
Review scores
Source	Rating
AllMusic	3.5/5 stars
The A.V. Club	C
Entertainment Weekly	B+
Los Angeles Times	2.5/4 stars
Rolling Stone	3/5 stars
Slant Magazine	2.5/5 stars
USA Today	3/4 stars

F.A.M.E. received mixed reviews from music critics according to review aggregator Metacritic, which gave the album a weighted average score of 52 out of 100 based on 16 reviews, indicating "mixed or average reviews".

Bred Wete of Entertainment Weekly praised the album in comparisons to Brown's other work, saying that "Musically he’s in top form" and "F.A.M.E. shines brighter than anything he produced before that now-infamous incident (...) on its own merits, F.A.M.E. deserves to be heard." Andy Kellman of AllMusic praised Brown's performances and the production, stating that "This all makes F.A.M.E. the equal of "Forever", if not slightly better, and it hints that Brown's best is yet to come." Jody Rosen of Rolling Stone praised the album's appeal, and said that "Brown takes a smarter approach: He's concentrated on making great songs. (...) F.A.M.E. is a pop 'n' b album with something for everyone." Steve Jones of USA Today found it "edgier" than Brown's previous work and said that it showcases "a more mature, confident and adventurous Brown who has emerged in the wake of all the drama, and he has delivered the strongest album of his career".

Margert Wappler of the Los Angeles Times said "Overall, the album leaves not an impression of one singular style but of the great effort required to mix and match so many times (...) All of it is done capably, even superbly in some cases", while calling Brown "a provocateur who particularly likes playing with the masks of masculinity." Evan Rytlewski of The A.V. Club commented that while "Brown [made] a solid case for himself as an adult artist", he also argued that the album "inevitably falls flat, though, when he tries to reclaim his teen-idol mantle on oversold ballads." Joe Caramanica of The New York Times stated "it’s not to his public advantage that on F.A.M.E., his fourth album, he sounds most comfortable at his most callow." Eric Henderson of Slant Magazine wrote that F.A.M.E. is an improvement from the previous album Graffiti: "The cute-to-ick ratio is significantly more favorable than it was last time around." Mariel Concepcion of Billboard wrote positively of it: "The easier-but not exactly wiser-route for Brown would’ve been to take jabs at those who turned their backs on him, but his tactic here seems to give listeners a solid album. And what better way to quiet naysayers than doing just that?". IGN expressed mixed feelings towards its content: "Chris Brown gets back to delivering some excellent radio-ready R&B jams on his latest effort, though they are stuffed between enough head-scratching missteps to leave the album a bit underwhelming". The Guardian noted the album as "an attempt to move on from the storm caused by Brown's assault on ex-girlfriend Rihanna in 2009".

David Amidon of Pop Matters argued that "Much of F.A.M.E. feels like an album tailor-made for stadium tours and sold out shows, songs more focused on mood and energy than message". Paula Yeoman of The New Zealand Herald commented Brown's public perception in her review: "F.A.M.E. has already clocked up a string of hits. It has to be said though, he's still not everyone's cup of tea". The Independent criticized the title: "The acronym apparently stands for "Forgiving All My Enemies", a typically self-pitying claim on the moral high ground from someone who, lest we forget, was convicted of assaulting a woman. Isn't forgiveness something Brown should be requesting, rather than bestowing?". Joe Rivers of No Ripcord went as far as to say that, "F.A.M.E. is a vile, despicable album that doesn't deserve to be supported in any way, shape or form. (...) If, in 2011, you’re wondering why feminism still exists, this record could go some way towards explaining why it’s still necessary."

=== Awards and nominations ===
Brown received six nominations at the 2011 BET Awards and ultimately won five awards, including Best Male R&B Artist, Viewers Choice Award, The Fandemonium Award, Best Collaboration and Video of the Year for "Look at Me Now". He also won three awards the 2011 BET Hip Hop Awards, including the People's Champ Award, Reese's Perfect Combo Award and Best Hip Hop Video for "Look at Me Now". F.A.M.E. was nominated for Favorite Soul/R&B Album at the 2011 American Music Awards. On November 27, 2011, it won Album of the Year at the 2011 Soul Train Music Awards. The album and its single, "Look at Me Now", earned Brown three nominations at the 54th Grammy Awards, including Best R&B Album, Best Rap Performance and Best Rap Song. F.A.M.E. eventually won in the Best R&B Album category. At the 2012 NAACP Image Awards, the album was nominated in the Outstanding Album category. F.A.M.E. was nominated in the Top R&B Album category of the 2012 Billboard Music Awards.

Awards and nominations for F.A.M.E.
Year	Ceremony	Category	Result	Ref.
2011	American Music Awards	Favorite Soul/R&B Album	Nominated	
2011	Soul Train Music Awards	Album of the Year	Won	
2012	Grammy Awards	Best R&B Album	Won	
2012	NAACP Image Awards	Outstanding Album	Nominated	
2012	Billboard Music Awards	Top R&B Album	Nominated	

== Commercial performance ==
F.A.M.E. debuted at number one on the US Billboard 200, with first-week sales of 270,000 copies, serving as Brown's first number-one album on the chart. Its first week sales also served as the second-largest one-week sales of 2011 in the United States alone. On the Top R&B/Hip-Hop Albums chart, F.A.M.E. also debuted at number one, giving Brown his third non-consecutive number-one album on the chart. As of May 2012, F.A.M.E. has sold 872,000 copies in the United States. In October 2021, the album was certified triple platinum by the Recording Industry Association of America (RIAA), for combined album sales and album-equivalent units of over three million units in the United States.

== Track listing ==
No.	Title	Writer(s)	Producer(s)	Length
1.	"Deuces" (featuring Tyga and Kevin McCall)	Chris Brown; Michael Stevenson; Kevin McCall	Kevin McCall	4:36
2.	"Up to You"	Harvey Mason Jr.; Lamar Edwards; Eric Dawkins; Steve Russell; Dewain Whitmore	The Underdogs	4:07
3.	"No Bullshit" (featuring Kevin McCall)	Brown; McCall	Tha Bizness	4:07
4.	"Look at Me Now" (featuring Lil Wayne and Busta Rhymes)	Brown; Dwayne Carter Jr.; Trevor Smith	Diplo; Afrojack; Free School*; Ryan Buendia*	3:42
5.	"She Ain't You"	Brown; McCall; Poo Bear; Cheryl "Coko" Gamble	Free School	4:08
6.	"Say It with Me"	Brown; Courtney Harrell; Eric Bellinger	H Money	3:01
7.	"Yeah 3x"	Brown; McCall; Amber Streeter	DJ Frank E; Calvin Harris	4:01
8.	"Next to You" (featuring Justin Bieber)	Brown; Streeter; Nasri Atweh	The Messengers	4:25
9.	"All Back"	Timothy Bloom	Timothy Bloom	4:26
10.	"Wet the Bed" (featuring Ludacris)	Brown; McCall; Streeter; Christopher Bridges	Bigg D	4:26
11.	"Oh My Love"	Brown; Streeter; Harrell; Bellinger	H Money	4:44
12.	"Should've Kissed You"	Brown; Whitmore	Brian Kennedy; T-Wiz; Brown*	4:24
13.	"Beautiful People" (Main Version; featuring Benny Benassi)	Brown	Benny Benassi; Alle Benassi	3:46

International bonus track
No.	Title	Writer(s)	Producer(s)	Length
14.	"Champion" (Chipmunk featuring Chris Brown)	Brown; Jahmaal Fyffe; Bellinger	H-Money	3:58

Deluxe edition additional tracks
No.	Title	Writer(s)	Producer(s)	Length
14.	"Bomb" (featuring Wiz Khalifa)	Brown; McCall; Streeter; Steph Jones; Cameron Thomaz	Free School	3:33
15.	"Love the Girls" (featuring The Game and Eva Simons)	Brown; India Boodram; Kesia Hollis; Jazmyn Michel; Jayceon Taylor	Polow da Don	3:11
16.	"Paper, Scissors, Rock" (featuring Timbaland and Big Sean)	Timothy Mosley; James Fauntleroy II; Sean Anderson	Timbaland; JRoc	3:46
17.	"Beg for It"	Brown; Streeter; Merritt; Priscilla Hamilton	Stereotypes; Ra Charm*	3:44

International deluxe edition bonus track
No.	Title	Writer(s)	Producer(s)	Length
18.	"Champion" (Chipmunk featuring Chris Brown)	Brown; Fyffe; Bellinger	H-Money	3:58

Team Breezy deluxe edition bonus track
No.	Title	Writer(s)	Producer(s)	Length
18.	"All About You"	Brown; Alain Whyte; Kennedy; Fauntleroy	Kennedy; Whyte; Fauntleroy	3:15

Japan deluxe edition bonus tracks
No.	Title	Producer(s)	Length
18.	"Talk Ya Ear Off"	Timbaland	3:13
19.	"Champion" (Chipmunk featuring Chris Brown)	H-Money	3:58

Notes

- • (co.) Co-producer
- "Wet the Bed" features uncredited background vocals by Muni Long.
- "Up to You" is titled as "Up 2 You" on the iTunes version of the album.
- "No Bullshit", which features Kevin McCall, is sometimes titled "No BS".
- "Yeah 3x" is stylized as "Yeah 3X" on the iTunes version of the album.
- "Next to You", which features Justin Bieber, is written as "Next 2 You" on the iTunes version of the album.
- "Bomb", which features Wiz Khalifa, was on the same version of the standard edition of the album, for a limited time only.

Sample credits

- "She Ain't You" contains portions of the recording "Right Here (Human Nature Radio Mix)" by SWV; and a sample of the recording "Human Nature" by Michael Jackson.
- "Yeah 3x", contains elements of the recording "I'm Not Alone" by Calvin Harris.
- "Bomb" contains a sample of the recording "Bam Bam" by Sister Nancy.

== Personnel ==
Credits for F.A.M.E. adapted from Allmusic.

- Afrojack – producer
- Nasri Atweh – producer
- Derrick "Bigg D" Baker – producer
- Mark Beaven – assistant
- Alessandro "Alle" Benassi – producer
- Marco "Benny" Benassi – producer
- Timothy Bloom – producer
- David Boyd – assistant
- Chris Brown – creative director, executive producer, producer
- Kweli Calderon – grooming
- Kenneth Cappello – photography
- Antwoine "T-Wiz" Collins – producer
- Michael Congdon – assistant, engineer
- Tom Coyne – mastering
- Michael Daley – assistant
- Tina Davis – executive producer
- Diplo – producer
- Lamar Edwards – keyboards
- Ron English – cover painting
- Dustin Faltz – assistant
- Iain Findlay – assistant
- Justin Franks – producer
- Free School – producer
- Jesus Garnica – assistant
- Serban Ghenea – mixing
- Dabling Harward – engineer
- Justin Henderson – producer
- Andrew Hey – engineer
- Ghazi Hourani – assistant
- Jaycen Joshua – mixing
- Marcus Johnson – assistant
- K Mac – producer
- Ryan Kelly – assistant
- Brian Kennedy – producer
- Mike Layos – assistant
- Lonnie-Smoek-Stinson – grooming
- Justin Merrill – assistant
- Adam Messinger – producer
- The Messingers – producer
- Mark Pitts – executive producer
- Harmony Samuels – producer
- Brian Springer – engineer, mixing
- Brian Stanley – mixing
- Amber Streeter – background vocals
- Anthony Taglianetti – assistant
- Team Breezy – art direction, creative director, design, executive producer, stylist
- Tha Bizness – producer
- David Thomas – stylist
- The Underdogs – producer
- Courtney Walter – art direction, creative director, design
- Christopher Whitacre – producer

== Charts ==
=== Weekly charts ===
Weekly chart performance for F.A.M.E.
Chart (2011)	Peak position
Australian Albums (ARIA)	3
Australian Urban Albums (ARIA)	1
Belgian Albums (Ultratop Flanders)	33
Belgian Albums (Ultratop Wallonia)	51
Canadian Albums (Billboard)	6
Danish Albums (Hitlisten)	33
Dutch Albums (Album Top 100)	16
French Albums (SNEP)	44
Irish Albums (IRMA)	8
Japanese Albums (Oricon)	25
New Zealand Albums (RMNZ)	7
Scottish Albums (Official Charts)	12
South African Albums (RISA)	18
South Korean Albums (Circle)	22
Spanish Albums (Promusicae)	76
Swiss Albums (Schweizer Hitparade)	34
UK Albums (Official Charts)	10
UK R&B Albums (Official Charts)	1
US Billboard 200	1
US Top R&B/Hip-Hop Albums (Billboard)	1

=== Year-end charts ===
2011 year-end chart performance for F.A.M.E.
Chart (2011)	Position
Australian Albums (ARIA)	53
Australian Urban Albums (ARIA)	11
UK Albums (OCC)	56
US Billboard 200	26
US Top R&B/Hip-Hop Albums (Billboard)	8

2012 year-end chart performance for F.A.M.E.
Chart (2012)	Position
US Top R&B/Hip-Hop Albums (Billboard)	48

== Certifications ==
Certifications for F.A.M.E.
Region	Certification	Certified units/sales
Australia (ARIA)	Platinum	70,000^{‡}
Denmark (IFPI Danmark)	Gold	10,000^{‡}
Ireland (IRMA)	Gold	7,500^{^}
New Zealand (RMNZ)	3× Platinum	45,000^{‡}
Sweden (GLF)	Gold	20,000^{‡}
United Kingdom (BPI)	Platinum	300,000^{‡}
United States (RIAA)	3× Platinum	3,000,000^{‡}
^{^} Shipments figures based on certification alone.^{‡} Sales+streaming figures based on certification alone.

== Release history ==
Release dates and formats for F.A.M.E.
Region	Date	Format	Edition(s)	Label
Australia	March 18, 2011	CD; digital download	Deluxe edition	Sony Music Entertainment
Sweden	March 18, 2011	CD; digital download	Deluxe edition	Sony Music Entertainment
Belgium	March 18, 2011	CD; digital download	Standard; deluxe edition	Sony Music Entertainment
Norway	March 18, 2011	CD; digital download	Standard; deluxe edition	Sony Music Entertainment
Netherlands	March 18, 2011	CD; digital download	Standard; deluxe edition	Sony Music Entertainment
France	March 21, 2011	CD; digital download	Standard; deluxe edition	Sony Music Entertainment
Finland	March 21, 2011	CD; digital download	Standard; deluxe edition	Sony Music Entertainment
New Zealand	March 21, 2011	CD; digital download	Deluxe edition	Sony Music Entertainment
United Kingdom	March 21, 2011	CD; digital download	Standard; deluxe edition	RCA Records
United States	March 22, 2011	CD; digital download	Standard; deluxe edition	Jive Records
Canada	March 22, 2011	CD; digital download	Standard; deluxe edition	Sony Music Entertainment
Italy	March 22, 2011	CD; digital download	Standard; deluxe edition	Sony Music Entertainment
Spain	March 22, 2011	CD; digital download	Standard; deluxe edition	Sony Music Entertainment
Ireland	April 4, 2011	CD; digital download	Deluxe edition	Sony Music Entertainment
Japan	April 6, 2011	CD; digital download	Deluxe edition	Sony Music Entertainment
