= F.A.M.E. Tour (Chris Brown) =

2011 concert tour by Chris Brown

- Tour by Chris Brown
- Promotional poster for the tour
- Associated album: F.A.M.E.
- Start date: April 20, 2011
- End date: December 9, 2011
- Legs: 3
- No. of shows: 4 in Oceania; 32 in North America; 1 in Middle East; 37 total

Chris Brown concert chronology
- Fan Appreciation Tour (2009); F.A.M.E. Tour (2011); Carpe Diem Tour (2012)

The F.A.M.E. Tour was a concert tour by American recording artist Chris Brown to support his fourth studio album, F.A.M.E. (2011). The tour began in Australia during April 2011. Brown headlined 32 concerts in North America, which began in September 2011 and ended in November 2011.

== Background ==
On January 19, 2011, it was announced that Brown would embark on his "F.A.M.E. Tour" in Australia in April 2011. Presented by Jive Live, managing director Daniel Pritchard said, "Australia will be the first country in the world to be able to see the new Chris Brown show. His incredible stage performances have earned him a reputation as one of this generation's most electrifying male performers." Tickets for the shows were available on February 4 at Ticketek. The North American tour dates were announced on August 10, 2011. When speaking of the tour, Brown said, "this tour will allow me to paint a picture musically ... I want to bring a lot of energy and excitement to all the fans. It's going to be a great show."

== Opening acts ==
- Jessica Mauboy (Australia)
- Justice Crew (Australia)
- Havana Brown (Australia)
- T-Pain (North America)
- Kelly Rowland (Select dates in North America)
- Tyga (North America)
- Bow Wow (Select dates in North America)

== Critical reception ==
Briony Skinner from Brisbane Times wrote that Brown "certainly put on a memorable show", and added that he "delivered on the most spectacular aspect of his live performance and what many fans go to see – the dancing." Adriana Urquia from MTV Australia wrote that Brown's vocal ability was "impressive" during the performances of his "heartfelt ballads". She also added that, "Overall ... Brown had the crowd amped up and moving, jumping on cue, waving their arms and singing his tracks word for word."

== Setlist ==
1. "Say It With Me"
2. "I Can Transform Ya"
3. "Wall to Wall"
4. "Run It!"
5. "Yo (Excuse Me Miss)"
6. "Body 2 Body"
7. "Wet the Bed"
8. "Take You Down"
9. "No Bullshit"
10. "She Ain't You"
11. "Oh My Love"
12. "Deuces"
13. "Look at Me Now"
14. "With You"
15. "All Back"
16. "No Air"
17. "Yeah 3x"
18. "Forever"

Encore

19. "Beautiful People"

== Tour dates ==
Date	City	Country	Venue
Oceania
April 20, 2011	Adelaide	Australia	Adelaide Entertainment Centre
April 23, 2011	Melbourne	Australia	Rod Laver Arena
April 26, 2011	Sydney	Australia	Acer Arena
April 29, 2011	Brisbane	Australia	Brisbane Entertainment Centre
North America
September 12, 2011	Toronto	Canada	Molson Canadian Amphitheatre
September 14, 2011	Darien	United States	Darien Lake Performing Arts Center
September 16, 2011	Holmdel	United States	PNC Bank Arts Center
September 17, 2011	Washington, D.C.	United States	Verizon Center
September 18, 2011	Detroit	United States	Joe Louis Arena
September 21, 2011	Cincinnati	United States	Riverbend Music Center
September 23, 2011	Tinley Park	United States	First Midwest Bank Amphitheatre
September 24, 2011	Maryland Heights	United States	Verizon Wireless Amphitheater St. Louis
September 25, 2011	Noblesville	United States	Verizon Wireless Music Center
September 28, 2011	Baltimore	United States	1st Mariner Arena
September 30, 2011	Uniondale	United States	Nassau Veterans Memorial Coliseum
October 1, 2011	Raleigh	United States	Time Warner Cable Music Pavilion
October 2, 2011	Atlanta	United States	Aaron's Amphitheatre at Lakewood
October 5, 2011	Miami	United States	American Airlines Arena
October 7, 2011	Tampa	United States	1-800-ASK-GARY Amphitheatre
October 8, 2011	Charlotte	United States	Verizon Wireless Amphitheatre
October 9, 2011	Virginia Beach	United States	Farm Bureau Live at Virginia Beach
October 12, 2011	Oklahoma City	United States	Chesapeake Energy Arena
October 14, 2011	Dallas	United States	Gexa Energy Pavilion
October 15, 2011	New Orleans	United States	New Orleans Arena
October 16, 2011	The Woodlands	United States	Cynthia Woods Mitchell Pavilion
October 18, 2011	Phoenix	United States	Ashley Furniture HomeStore Pavilion
October 20, 2011	Los Angeles	United States	Staples Center
October 22, 2011	Concord	United States	Sleep Train Pavilion
October 23, 2011	Wheatland	United States	Sleep Train Amphitheatre
October 26, 2011	Memphis	United States	FedExForum
October 28, 2011	Philadelphia	United States	Wells Fargo Center
October 29, 2011	Pittsburgh	United States	Consol Energy Center
October 30, 2011	Uncasville	United States	Mohegan Sun Arena
November 1, 2011	Cleveland	United States	Wolstein Center
November 4, 2011	Phoenix	United States	Ashley Furniture HomeStore Pavilion
November 5, 2011	Irvine	United States	Verizon Wireless Amphitheatre
November 6, 2011	Chula Vista	United States	Cricket Wireless Amphitheatre
Middle East
December 9, 2011	Dubai	United Arab Emirates	Dubai Festival City Concert Arena

=== Canceled dates ===
Date	City	Country	Venue	Reason
May 3, 2011	Perth	Australia	Burswood Dome	Illness
November 2, 2011	Moline	United States	iWireless Center	Scheduling conflict
