= Best Love Song =

Single by T-Pain featuring Chris Brown

from the album RevolveЯ
- Released: March 22, 2011
- Recorded: 2011
- Genre: Pop; pop rock; R&B
- Length: 3:17
- Label: Nappy Boy; Konvict; Jive
- Songwriters: Faheem Najm; Chris Brown
- Producer: Young Fyre

T-Pain singles chronology
"Boom" (2011)	"Best Love Song" (2011)	"Booty Wurk (One Cheek at a Time)" (2011)

Chris Brown singles chronology
"Beautiful People" (2011)	"Best Love Song" (2011)	"She Ain't You" (2011)

"Best Love Song" is a single by American recording artist T-Pain. The song features Chris Brown and was released as the first official single from his fourth studio album, RevolveЯ, on March 22, 2011. The song was featured in the pilot of The CW TV series Hart of Dixie.

== Background ==
The song serves as the first official single from RevolveЯ, following the release of the singles "Take Your Shirt Off", "Rap Song", and "Reverse Cowgirl", which were billed as promotional singles. The song originally featured R&B artist Akon. The song also has background vocals from R&B group One Chance, Jon A. Gordon, Michael A. Gordon (The Gordon Brothers)

The song, along with another track from RevolveR, "Separated", was first released to the public by T-Pain himself on February 7, 2011, via Twitter. T-Pain leaked the song himself on Twitter as a response to poor-quality rips of his upcoming music being leaked to the Internet, stating: "Since nobody wants to respect this form of art that you all say we 'love' so much, I'm just gonna go ahead and start leakin the album myself tonight". The song was then officially released as a single in digital download format on March 22, 2011.

== Critical reception ==
IGN editor Chad Grichow panned the song: "The only uptempo tune it becomes a hindrance on is "Best Love Song", where Chris Brown and T-Pain make the terrible decision to attempt harmony. The combination of T-Pain's electro-wave vocals and Brown's smooth voice is the sound of soul flat lining." Jon Caramanica of The New York Times compared this song: "T-Pain also makes implicit arguments for himself in the lineage of R&B superhits: “Best Love Song” nods to Rihanna's “Umbrella,” and “Bang Bang Pow Pow,” with its drunken strings, feels like a homage to Sisqo's “Thong Song.” Jesse Cataldo wrote that "T-Pain can still pull in big names but can't provide interesting atmospheres for them to work in."

== Music video ==
On May 25, 2011, the official music video for "Best Love Song" was released via VEVO The music video depicts T-Pain and Chris Brown battling against each other to impress a certain girl who also appears in the video. But at the end she goes with another guy. The concept of the video, as well as the battle sequences depicted in the video, is a direct reference to the "battle of the bands" segment from the 2010 film Scott Pilgrim vs. the World.

== Chart positions ==
Chart (2011)	Peak position
Australia (ARIA)	32
Australia Urban (ARIA)	18
German Black Chart	28
US Billboard Hot 100	33
US Pop Airplay	33
US Rhythmic (Billboard)	23
UK Singles (OCC)	40
UK R&B (The Official Charts Company)	14

== Certifications ==
Region	Certification	Certified units/sales
Australia (ARIA)	Gold	35,000^{^}
New Zealand (RMNZ)	Platinum	30,000^{‡}
^{^} Shipments figures based on certification alone.^{‡} Sales+streaming figures based on certification alone.
