= Next to You (Chris Brown song) =

Single by Chris Brown featuring Justin Bieber

from the album F.A.M.E.
- Released: June 21, 2011
- Recorded: February 20, 2011
- Studio: Westlake Recording Studios (West Hollywood, California)
- Genre: Pop; R&B
- Length: 4:25
- Label: Jive
- Songwriters: Chris Brown; Adam Messinger; Sevyn Streeter; Nasri Atweh; Azeem Alam
- Producer: The Messengers

Chris Brown singles chronology
"She Ain't You" (2011)	"Next to You" (2011)	"Pot of Gold" (2011)

Justin Bieber singles chronology
"Pray" (2010)	"Next to You" (2011)	"Mistletoe" (2011)

Music video
- "Next to You" on YouTube

"Next to You" is a song by American singer Chris Brown, featuring Canadian singer Justin Bieber, included as a track on the former's fourth studio album, F.A.M.E., released on June 21, 2011. Brown co-wrote the song with producer Adam Messinger, frequent collaborator Sevyn Streeter of American girl group RichGirl, and singer Nasri Atweh. The track is one of four that Brown and Bieber worked on together, the others being a remix of Bieber's "Up" (2011), "Ladies Love Me" contained in Brown's mixtape Boy in Detention (2011), and "Don't Check on Me" from Brown's 2019 album Indigo.

Musically, "Next to You" is a pop and R&B number, with lyrics pertaining to the love between two people in a relationship, expressing unwavering support and commitment. Music critics reviewed the song positively, praising its musicality and lyrics, and considering it one of the most "pop" moments on F.A.M.E.. After the release of the album, the song appeared on the music charts of the United States, Canada, and the United Kingdom. It was released for digital download on June 24, 2011, as the album's fifth single.

== Background ==
"Being able to collab with [Bieber] was great. He's a young, energetic cat, so being able to work with him was incredible [...] He's doing his thing at a young age, and I was doing mine at a young age, so being able to see him come up is dope".

— Chris Brown on working with Justin Bieber on "Next to You".

The song was written by Brown, Adam Messinger, Nasri Atweh and Sevyn Streeter. They entirely composed and recorded the track, then Bieber added his vocals to it. In December 2010, Brown tweeted that he would be collaborating with Bieber. The song first appeared online on March 8, 2011. The song was one of three collaborations between Bieber and Brown in 2011, the others being a remix of "Up" from Bieber's My World 2.0 album, which was included as a track on his Never Say Never: The Remixes set, and "Ladies Love Me", contained in Brown's hip hop mixtape Boy in Detention. In an interview with MTV News, Brown revealed that the duo recorded the "Up" remix first, and Brown wanted Bieber on his album after their first collaboration.

== Composition ==
"Next to You"
A sample of "Next to You"'s chorus, that features vocals from both singers.

"Next to You" is a pop and R&B song. The song’s lyrics depict a deep romantic connection that helps a couple overcome difficulties together. Eliot Glazer of MTV Buzzworthy said that the song's lyrics mix "inspirational" and "affectionate" themes. It features "digitized" violins. According to the sheet music at Musicnotes.com by Sony/ATV Music Publishing, the song is set in common time with a moderate tempo of 116 beats per minute. It is composed in the key of E♭ major with Bieber and Brown's vocal ranges spanning from the low-note of G_{3} to the high-note of C_{6}. The song features the chord progression of E♭–B♭–Cm–A♭. Nadia Noir of WNOW-FM said the song was a danceable "love-song." Furthermore, AOL Music's Charley Rogulewski called the song a "dreamy pop love song." The song sees Brown and Bieber trading verses and the chorus in lyrics like "I'll be there when you're insecure/ Let you know that you're always lovely/ Girl, because you are the only thing that I got right now."

== Music video ==
=== Background ===
The music video for "Next to You" was directed by Colin Tilley and filmed in May 2011 at the Universal Studios in Los Angeles and upper Manhattan. On May 10, 2011, Bieber's manager confirmed plans for a music video via Twitter. In an interview with MTV News, Tilley spoke briefly about the video, saying "Tomorrow, I'm shooting New Boyz and Chris Brown ... then Justin Bieber and Chris Brown, together ... I can't tell you anything about that yet, but it's going to happen. It's gonna be big. It's gonna be big. I can't say anything else." On May 21, 2011, Brown posted two photos from the shoot via Twitter, showing him and Bieber standing among overturned cars in a path of destruction. However, the unfinished version of the music video leaked onto the internet on June 6, and the final cut version was premiered on June 17, 2011.

=== Synopsis ===
Bieber (left) and Brown sing and dance among the destruction during the music video.

The video begins with Brown and Bieber interacting with their girlfriends while the song "All Back" by Chris Brown is playing. Bieber's love interest is removed by her father, who reprimands, "You will never see him again. You understand that?" Brown is thinking of his girlfriend (played by Shannon Elizabeth) before the apocalypse occurs, which is characterized by land fissures, buildings toppling down and fiery scenery. Brown searches for his love interest who is then hit by the car that Bieber's girlfriend is in. Brown tries to save her by leaping over an enormous fissure, but, failing to do so, he falls into it. Near the end of the video, Bieber's girlfriend finds him on top of the roof of a building and it ends with them reuniting and kissing. Interspersed are scenes of Brown and Bieber dancing amongst the destruction. Jamie Peck of MTV wrote of the video, "The whole thing is delightfully ridiculous in its cinematic drama". The video was nominated for International Artist Video of the Year at the 2012 MuchMusic Video Awards.

== Critical reception ==
"Next To You" was met with positive reviews. Brad Wete of Entertainment Weekly coined the song as "thumping" and said that "Brown and guest Justin Bieber trade verses assuring their ladies of their dedication." Joanne Dorken of MTV News UK said "It seems that everything Justin Bieber touches turns to gold at the moment and this cutesy ballad is no exception." Dorken complimented how well the song showed the blending of the pair's voices, and she commented, as "the most 'pop' song on the LP, we are hoping Chris decides to make this a single ... a sure fire hit." Nadia Noir of WNOW-FM wrote, "What do you get when you combine two of pop's best-looking/greatest dancers, the sexy rasp of Justin Bieber, and a dance-jam/love-song? A combination of all the best elements of music!" Nick Levine of BBC Music called the collaboration a "wholesome-as-homemade-chutney hook-up". While commending that the album had "something for everyone", Jody Rosen of Rolling Stone called "Next to You" a "tender love declaration." Bri LaPelusa called the song a "dreamy ballad" and praised the singer's vocal performances, saying that it showcased Brown and Bieber's "angelic" voices. She went on to add that "Next to You" "might be affirmation that Chris Brown is once again an accepted celebrity."

Praising the lyrics, Eliot Glazer of MTV Buzzworthy described them as "affectionate" and "universal". Despite complimenting the record, Eric Henderson of Slant Magazine said Brown was unable to capture the "majesty of 'Forever'" with the "pop-appeal" of the song. Jon Caramanica of The New York Times wrote that the song does complement Brown's voice, but not Bieber's.

== Chart performance ==
Due to digital sales after the release of F.A.M.E., "Next to You" debuted on the US Billboard Hot 100 and the Canadian Hot 100 charts of the week ending April 9, 2011. The song debuted at number ten on the Hot Digital Songs chart in the US, and at number 26 on the Hot 100. The following week, the song fell to number ninety before falling off the chart the next week. On the Canadian Hot 100, it debuted at number 36, and spent one week on the chart.

In the United Kingdom, after the release of F.A.M.E., "Next to You" appeared at number forty-nine. It spent one week on the chart. After being released as a single, it appeared on the chart again and eventually peaked at number fourteen. The single was eventually certified gold by the British Phonographic Industry (BPI) for sales of over 400,000 copies in the UK.

== Credits and personnel ==
- Vocals – Chris Brown, Justin Bieber
- Writing – Chris Brown, Sevyn Streeter
- Production – The Messengers
- Vocal production – Kuk Harrell
- Vocal recording – Kuk Harrell, Josh Gudwin
- Mixing – Jaycen Joshua, assisted by Jesus Garncia

== Track listing ==
The single package of the song contains the official duet from Brown and Bieber, a solo version by Brown, and the b-side song "Talk Ya Ear Off"

Digital download
No.	Title	Length
1.	"Next to You" (featuring Justin Bieber)	4:25

Digital download – radio edit
No.	Title	Length
1.	"Next to You" (featuring Justin Bieber) (Radio edit)	3:31
2.	"Next to You" (Radio edit)	3:30

Streaming services
No.	Title	Length
1.	"Next to You" (featuring Justin Bieber) (Radio edit)	3:31
2.	"Next to You" (Radio edit)	3:30
3.	"Talk Ya Ear Off"	3:13

== Charts ==
=== Weekly charts ===
2011 weekly chart performance for "Next to You"
Chart (2011)	Peak position
Australia (ARIA)	22
Australia Urban (ARIA)	9
Austria (Ö3 Austria Top 40)	20
Belgium (Ultratip Bubbling Under Flanders)	10
Belgium (Ultratip Bubbling Under Wallonia)	7
Canada Hot 100 (Billboard)	36
Germany (GfK)	28
Ireland (IRMA)	21
New Zealand (Recorded Music NZ)	11
Scottish Singles Sales (Official Charts)	12
Slovakia Airplay (ČNS IFPI)	37
South Korea (GAON)	95
Switzerland (Schweizer Hitparade)	74
UK Singles (Official Charts)	14
US Billboard Hot 100	26

2026 weekly chart performance for "Next to You"
Chart (2026)	Peak position
Philippines Hot 100 (Billboard Philippines)	71

=== Year-end charts ===
2011 year-end chart performance for "Next to You"
Chart (2011)	Position
Brazil (Crowley)	83

== Certifications ==
Certifications for "Next to You"
Region	Certification	Certified units/sales
Australia (ARIA)	2× Platinum	140,000^{‡}
Denmark (IFPI Danmark)	Gold	45,000^{‡}
New Zealand (RMNZ)	2× Platinum	60,000^{‡}
Norway (IFPI Norway)	2× Platinum	20,000^{*}
Sweden (GLF)	Gold	20,000^{‡}
United Kingdom (BPI)	Platinum	600,000^{‡}
United States (RIAA)	2× Platinum	2,000,000^{‡}
^{*} Sales figures based on certification alone.^{‡} Sales+streaming figures based on certification alone.

== Release history ==
Country	Date	Format	Label
Austria	June 24, 2011	Digital download	Sony Music Entertainment
Belgium	June 24, 2011	Digital download	Sony Music Entertainment
Denmark	June 24, 2011	Digital download	Sony Music Entertainment
France	June 24, 2011	Digital download	Sony Music Entertainment
Ireland	June 24, 2011	Digital download	Sony Music Entertainment
Netherlands	June 24, 2011	Digital download	Sony Music Entertainment
Norway	June 24, 2011	Digital download	Sony Music Entertainment
Sweden	June 24, 2011	Digital download	Sony Music Entertainment
Switzerland	June 24, 2011	Digital download	Sony Music Entertainment
Austria	July 8, 2011	Digital download – radio edit	Sony Music Entertainment
Germany	July 8, 2011	Digital download – radio edit	Sony Music Entertainment
Germany	August 19, 2011	CD single	Sony Music Entertainment
