= Wet the Bed =

Single by Chris Brown featuring Ludacris

from the album F.A.M.E.
- Released: September 13, 2011 (airplay)
- Recorded: 2010 The Record Plant (Los Angeles, California)
- Genre: R&B
- Length: 4:26 (album version)
- Label: Jive
- Songwriters: Chris Brown; Kevin McCall; Amber Streeter aka Sevyn Streeter; Andre Merritt; Joseph Bereal; Stanley Kubie; Derrick Baker; Christopher Bridges
- Producer: Derrick "Bigg D" Baker

Chris Brown singles chronology
"Better with the Lights Off" (2011)	"Wet the Bed" (2011)	"International Love" (2011)

Ludacris singles chronology
"Little Bad Girl" (2011)	"Wet the Bed" (2011)	"Tonight (Best You Ever Had)" (2012)

Audio video
- "Wet the Bed" on YouTube

"Wet the Bed" is a song by American singer Chris Brown featuring American rapper Ludacris, originally released as a track from the former's fourth studio album F.A.M.E. (2011). It was written the artists alongside Kevin McCall, Muni Long (who provides additional vocals), Andre Merritt, Lonny Bereal, and producer Derrick "Bigg D" Baker. Lyrically, the song sees Brown and Ludacris exploring ways to leave a woman satisfied. "Wet the Bed" received mixed reviews from most music critics, who were ambivalent towards its lyrics. It reached #77 on the Billboard Hot 100 and is certified platinum by the RIAA. The song has been performed live at the album's listening party, as well as on Brown's F.A.M.E. Tour.

== Background and composition ==
It was recorded and mixed by Brian Springer at The Record Plant—a studio in Los Angeles, California. "Wet the Bed" is a slow-tempo R&B song. The song begins with keys laced over a beat of dripping sound effects. It also makes use of acoustic guitar. According to Brad Wete from Entertainment Weekly, the song "rival[s] the bump-'n'-grind heights of '90s Casanova crew Jodeci." Ludacris opens the song proclaiming: "Hear the sound of your body drip, drip, drip / As I kiss both sexy lip, lip, lips." Using "blatant sexual metaphors", Brown then sings: "I ain't afraid to drown, if that means I deep up in your ocean yeah / Girl I'll drink you down, sipping on your body all night."

== Live performances ==
Brown and Ludacris performed the song live for the first time at a listening party for Brown's album F.A.M.E on March 18, 2011. For the performance, Brown wore navy pants and a blue hoodie reading "F.A.M.E.", while Ludacris wore sunglasses, a black shirt and jacket, and grey pants. In April 2011, Brown embarked on his F.A.M.E. Tour in Australia, where he performed "Wet the Bed" as part of the concert's setlist.

== Critical reception ==
Critics praised Brown's vocal performance but criticized the oversexual lyrics. Steve Jones from USA Today called the song "salacious" and wrote that Brown is "taking it to the next phase." Joanne Dorken from MTV UK felt "rather apprehensive" of the song, and noted it "sees Breezy exploring ways to er, leave a woman satisfied." Nick Levine from BBC Music wrote that "Brown's identity crisis is betrayed most blatantly by the sequencing of "Wet the Bed."" Hannah Ash from The Harber Herald criticized the song's lyrics for being "kind of a gross-out and really don't need to be paid attention to", but praised Brown's "beautiful vocals, so that makes up for it." Eric Henderson from Slant Magazine criticized the song's opening verse, as well as Ludacris' verse, "Women call me the Super Soaker and Ima soak your bed to death", as "some new form of jizz torture." Calling the song an "over-the-top hyper-sexual", Chad Grischow from IGN wrote that it is the "kind of excessively crude sludge that would have made 12 Play era R. Kelly blush." Cristin Maher from PopCrush wrote that "it is almost shocking to hear the unbelievably lustful lyrics projecting from Brown as he sings the song".

== Chart performance ==
In the issue dated July 30, 2011, "Wet the Bed" debuted at number 89 on the US Hot R&B/Hip-Hop Songs chart, and peaked at number nine in the issue dated October 8, 2011. On the US Billboard Hot 100 chart, the song debuted at number 96 in the issue dated September 24, 2011 and peaked at number 77.

== Credits and personnel ==
Credits adapted from the liner notes for F.A.M.E..

- Derrick "Bigg D" Baker – songwriter, guitar, producer
- Steven "Q-Beatz" Kubie aka "The Kid" – programming, keys, engineering, songwriter
- Joseph Bereal – songwriter
- Chris Brown – songwriter, lead vocals
- Iain Findlay – assistant mixer
- David Anderson – additional keyboards
- Eric Manco – engineer
- Ryan Coplan – assistant engineer
- Ludacris – songwriter, featured vocals
- Kevin McCall – songwriter
- Andre Merritt – songwriter
- Brian Springer – recorder, mixer
- Amber Streeter – songwriter, featured vocals

== Charts ==
=== Weekly charts ===
2011 weekly chart performance for "Wet the Bed"
Chart (2011)	Peak position
US Billboard Hot 100	77
US Hot R&B/Hip-Hop Songs (Billboard)	6
US Rhythmic Airplay (Billboard)	39

2022 weekly chart performance for "Wet the Bed"
Chart (2022)	Peak position
Philippines (Billboard)	5

=== Year-end charts ===
2011 year-end chart performance for "Wet the Bed"
Chart (2011)	Position
US Hot R&B/Hip-Hop Songs	49

2012 year-end chart performance for "Wet the Bed"
Chart (2012)	Position
US Hot R&B/Hip-Hop Songs	87

== Certifications ==
Certifications for "Wet the Bed"
Region	Certification	Certified units/sales
New Zealand (RMNZ)	Gold	15,000^{‡}
United States (RIAA)	Platinum	1,000,000^{‡}
^{‡} Sales+streaming figures based on certification alone.

== Radio add dates ==
Country	Date	Format
United States	September 13, 2011	Urban contemporary radio
