= Look at Me Now (Chris Brown song) =

Single by Chris Brown featuring Lil Wayne and Busta Rhymes

from the album F.A.M.E.
- Released: February 1, 2011
- Recorded: 2010
- Studio: The Record Plant, Los Angeles
- Genre: Hip hop
- Length: 3:44
- Label: Jive
- Songwriters: Chris Brown; Thomas Pentz; Jean Baptiste; Ryan Buendia; Dwayne Carter; Trevor Smith; Nick van de Wall
- Producers: Diplo; Afrojack; Free School

Chris Brown singles chronology
"No Bullshit" (2011)	"Look at Me Now" (2011)	"Champion" (2011)

Busta Rhymes singles chronology
"C'mon (Catch 'Em by Surprise)" (2011)	"Look at Me Now" (2011)	"Welcome to My Hood (Remix)" (2011)

Lil Wayne singles chronology
"Welcome to My Hood" (2011)	"Look at Me Now" (2011)	"Hit the Lights" (2011)

Music video
- "Look at Me Now" on YouTube

"Look at Me Now" is a song by American singer and rapper Chris Brown featuring American rappers Lil Wayne and Busta Rhymes released as the second single from Brown's fourth studio album F.A.M.E. on February 1, 2011. The artists co-wrote the song with its producers Afrojack, Diplo, and Free School, with additional writing from Ryan Buendia. Musically, "Look at Me Now" is a "dirty south–inspired" hip hop song that features "thumping bass, spacy synth and horn jam sounds."

Critical reception towards the song was positive, where critics noted it as a standout track on the album, and praised Busta Rhymes and Lil Wayne's rap verses. "Look at Me Now" proved to be successful in the United States, where it reached number six on the Billboard Hot 100 chart, making it Brown's highest chart position since "Forever" (2008). It also reached number one on the Hot Rap Songs and Hot R&B/Hip-Hop Songs charts. Internationally, the song charted in Australia, Canada, France, New Zealand and the United Kingdom. Among the certifications it gained, it was most notably certified diamond by the Recording Industry Association of America (RIAA).

An accompanying music video was directed by Colin Tilley and filmed in Los Angeles, California. It features numerous scenes of Brown, Busta Rhymes, and Lil Wayne in a smoke-filled, graffiti-covered parking garage, where a Step Up-type dance-off is held. The video received a positive response from critics for displaying various colors and intricate routines performed by Brown and several dancers. The song won three awards at the 2011 BET Awards for Best Collaboration, Viewer's Choice and Video of the Year. Several artists have covered the song and released their own remixes, including Karmin, Justin Bieber, Trey Songz and Da Brat.

== Background and release ==
The artists co-wrote "Look at Me Now" with its producers Afrojack, Diplo, and Free School, with additional writing from Ryan Buendia. The song was mixed by Brian Springer at The Record Plant—a studio in Los Angeles, California. "Look at Me Now" was released for digital download on February 1, 2011, and was sent to rhythmic contemporary radio in the United States on February 8. In an interview with Vibe magazine, Diplo revealed that when he was first asked to put the song together, he thought that "Look at Me Now" was not for an official release, saying: "I knew that I was working on something for a Chris Brown record, but I thought it was for a mixtape". Afrojack told MTV News that the song was the product of a beat he passed to Diplo. Brown later discussed the song’s creation during a 2022 interview, explaining that it was recorded during sessions for one of his mixtapes. Regarding the featured artists, he recalled asking Busta Rhymes to re-do his verse.

At the time of the song’s release, Mark Pitts, president of urban music at RCA Music Group, initially expressed hesitation about including the track on the album, as it represented a stylistic shift from Brown’s R&B background toward hip hop. However, Brown persuaded him to reconsider. Pitts later explained: “It took me a minute to really appreciate (‘Look at Me Now’). I didn’t want to like it because I didn’t want him rapping. It doesn’t really bother me (any) more. It used to bother me. But why fight it? If it sounds good, it sounds good. As long as you’re not trying to be someone else, I’m cool with it.”

== Composition ==
"Look at Me Now"
A sample of "Look at Me Now", featuring "thumping bass, spacy synth and horn jam sounds."

"Look at Me Now" is a "dirty south–inspired" hip hop song that features American rappers Lil Wayne and Busta Rhymes. According to Chad Grischow from IGN, the song features "thumping bass, spacy synth and horn jam sounds." Electronic background mixes are also present in the song. Over a hip hop drum beat that evokes Cali Swag District's 2010 single "Teach Me How to Dougie", "Brown sings that he's still riding high (in a yellow Lamborghini, to boot) before venturing off into a discussion of his manhood", according to staff members from Idolator. Jon Caramanica from The New York Times also wrote that on the song, Brown "double-time-raps about stealing girlfriends." Akshay Bhansali from MTV News wrote that "Look at Me Now" features "a fast-rapping flurry of awesome self-indulgence courtesy of Busta Rhymes, Lil Wayne and Chris, with an eerie downtempo beat cooked up by chefs Afrojack and Diplo."

== Music video ==
=== Background ===
The accompanying music video for "Look at Me Now" was directed by Colin Tilley and filmed in Los Angeles, California on February 16, 2011. Images from the shoot were released online the next day, as one of the images showed Chris Brown, Lil Wayne and Busta Rhymes standing on top of an ambulance car in front of an industrial building, while another image showed the DeLorean sports car from the 1985 film, Back to the Future. The video premiered online on March 10, 2011. Brown spoke about the video in an interview with MTV News, saying,

With the concept of "Look at Me Now" you know this video is kind of like my first rap kind of video, but I wanted to do old school; [well] not really old school, but like back in the day, when I was just growing up as a kid. [I wanted the video to have a] '90s type feel [and] big, baggy clothes. [It's] abstract, a lot of art and graffiti. I tried to blend all those components into one [and] make it fun and exciting.

Brown told VEVO, during a 2013 interview, that in the video he wanted to "incorporate all the new dances that's hot in the streets that the people are watching", while paying homage to Spike Lee and '90s hip hop with the aesthetic part.

The image shows Brown with several dancers, performing intricate routines, which were praised by critics. Additionally, red lights are visible, which were also praised due to the contrast the colorful lasers added to the video.

=== Synopsis ===
The video begins with scenes of Brown wearing a mirrored mask inside a giant birdcage, before switching to a dance routine in a smoke-filled, graffiti-covered parking garage. The mask was created for Brown by producer-collaborator Nick Marsh. In between these scenes, the video shows a Step Up-type dance-off in the parking garage. When Brown raps his verse, he is seen standing next to Rhymes, wearing horn-rimmed glasses, a red Brooklyn cap, and a white baseball jersey, which was the signature look of Mars Blackmon from the 1986 film, She's Gotta Have It. Rhymes then raps his verse after Brown's, standing beside him and later on the stairs in the parking garage. Wayne's verse soon follows after, with scenes of him rapping in front of the DeLorean sports car, and also on top of an ambulance car. The video also features cameo appearance from Kevin McCall, Diplo, Birdman, Tyga and Mack Maine. Birdman and Maine appear when Lil Wayne is performing his verse.

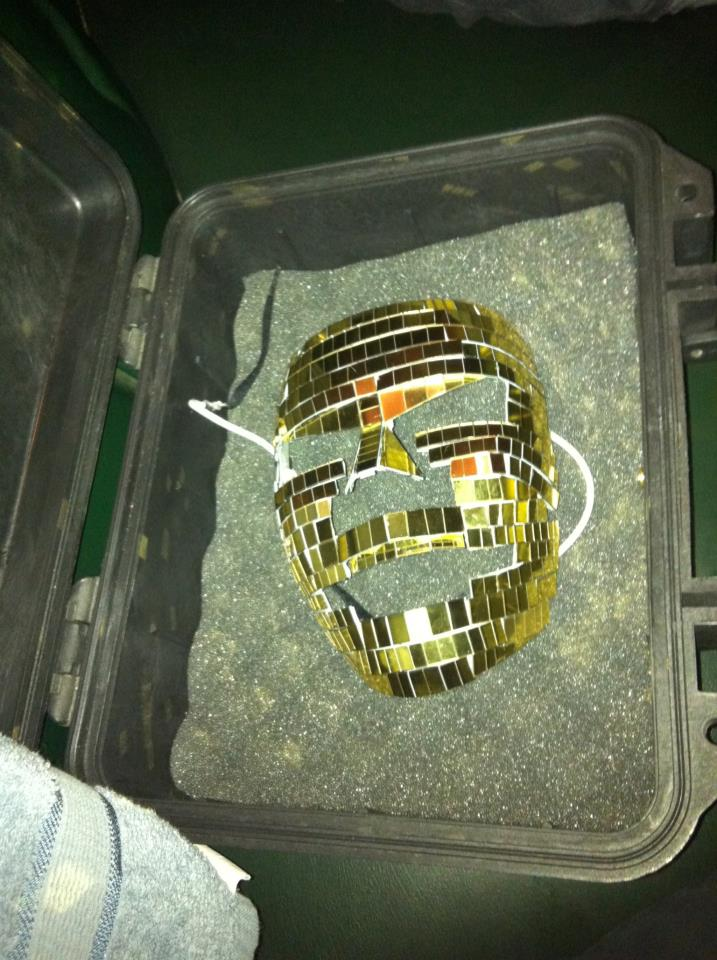
The custom mask worn by Chris Brown in "Look at Me Now"'s video

=== Reception ===
Brad Wete from Entertainment Weekly praised Brown's dancing in the video. Ed Easton Jr. from WXRK wrote that the video was "cool and fun to watch", and added that "the random array of colors displayed by Breezy and company definitely keeps you locked in as a viewer." Amanda Hensel from PopCrush called Brown's dance moves, in the video, "game-changing", and wrote, "the video lays a solid ground for Brown's potential big comeback to the scene." Becky Bain from Idolator criticized the video for having the same concept as many other music videos in the past. In December 2011, Latifah Muhammad of The Boombox placed the video at number seven on her list of the Best Videos of 2011, writing that "The music video was an ode to old school rap, with Chris tapping into his inner-Fresh Prince by way of his colorful wardrobe." The video won Video of the Year at the 2011 BET Awards, and Best Hip Hop Video at the 2011 BET Hip Hop Awards. At the 2011 MTV Video Music Awards, it was nominated for Best Hip-Hop Video and Best Collaboration. At the 38th People's Choice Awards, the video was nominated for Favorite Music Video.

== Live performances ==
During Brown's visit to Australia for his F.A.M.E. Tour, he made a guest appearance at Canadian recording artist Justin Bieber's concert at the Acer Arena in Sydney on April 28, 2011, where they performed "Look at Me Now" together. For the performance, Bieber covered Busta Rhymes' verse. On June 26, 2011, Brown performed the song at the 2011 BET Awards, where he opened his performance with his single "She Ain't You", while wearing a gray suit with voluminous pant legs and a cape fashioned out of a jacket. He then performed "Look at Me Now", as a group of dancers in similarly street black hoodies joined him on stage. For the performance, Brown switched his outfit to a black jumpsuit. Rhymes later appeared from a brightly lit cube flanked by dancers in eerie, transparent masks illuminated by blinking lights. Wearing a black jacket with enormous, ridged sleeves, Rhymes dropped the microphone after performing his verse and walked off the stage. Brown ended the performance with "Paper, Scissors, Rock", a song from F.A.M.E.. On December 12, 2023, Busta Rhymes performed his verse of the song at the opening ceremony of the FIFA Club World Cup in Jeddah, Saudi Arabia.

== Remixes and cover versions ==
American R&B singer Trey Songz released a remix of "Look at Me Now" via Twitter on February 4, 2011. In his version, Songz asks Brown why he didn't call him to be part of the song. A So So Def remix of the song, featuring American rapper Da Brat, was released online via Rap-Up on April 13, 2011. In April 2011, pop duo Karmin uploaded a video of them performing a cover version of "Look at Me Now" onto YouTube. Within three days of its release, the video had been viewed over 560,000 times. In their version, member Amy Heidemann recreates verses rapped by Brown, Busta Rhymes and Lil Wayne, while member Nick Noonan backs her up on the keyboard. Justin Bieber performed "Look at Me Now" during his My World Tour in Tel Aviv, Israel on April 14, 2011, where he covered Brown and Rhymes' verses. On November 30, 2011, American rapper Mac Lethal released a cover video of the song onto YouTube, in which he performs a version with his own lyrics while simultaneously cooking pancakes. American rapper Twista also creates his own verses for the song. St. Louis-based rapper Chingy also released his freestyle verse of the song.

== Critical reception ==
Jon Caramanica of The New York Times gave "Look at Me Now" a positive review, praising Diplo and Afrojack's "fabulous, insidiously catchy production" and wrote that the song was the highlight on F.A.M.E.. The San Diego Union-Tribune said that “The song is just another example of Brown’s rapping prowess” with the singer “[dominating] more than just the R&B territory”. Tom Howard of Yahoo! Music wrote that the song was "the album's standout track... which benefits from some truly excellent bleepy production and a vocal savagery lacking anywhere else." Joanne Dorken of MTV UK called it an "uptempo dance-floor filler", also writing that it was one of the standout tracks on the album "with its unforgettable beats." Sean Fennessey of The Washington Post called the track a "space-age sonic bender" and wrote that it's "the most prominent of Brown's surprisingly deft, if extraneous, attempts at rap." According to HotNewHipHop, "'Look at Me Now' is notable for its rapid-fire verses and complex production. Busta Rhymes delivers one of the fastest rap verses of his career. The track’s success highlighted Brown’s versatility and ability to collaborate with artists from different genres". Billboard said that “Look At Me Now” "is a hit, sonically and lyrically. Diplo’s addictive beat and impressive verses from all three of the songs’ artists make the song one of Breezy’s catchiest cuts."

XXL and Vibe stated that Busta Rhymes' verse on the song is one of the standout moments of his career. Ed Easton Jr. of radio station WNOW-FM called the song a "cocky and hip hop based song" and commented that Brown's ability to rap on "Look at Me Now" was not close to Lil Wayne and Busta Rhymes' level. Eric Henderson of Slant Magazine shared the same point of view of Ed Easton. Bri LaPelusa of UR Chicago called the song "the most gangsta" track on F.A.M.E., and wrote "the abruptly homophobic/misogynistic lyrics and elementary rhyming from Busta Rhymes and Lil Wayne dampen the song's appeal." Chad Grischow of IGN wrote, "Brown tries his hand at rapping on the out-of-place 'Look at Me Now', and is left in the dust by Lil Wayne and, suddenly resurgent, Busta Rhymes." Staff members of Idolator compared Brown's verse to works by Soulja Boy Tell 'Em and praised Busta Rhymes' "razor sharp verse" as the song's highlight. Stereogum while critiquing Brown's personal life during a review, praised his musical ability and the track, stating that "It brings me no joy to report that “Look At Me Now” is a 10".

=== Recognition and accolades ===
In December 2011, Jon Caramanica of The New York Times placed "Look at Me Now" on his list of the Top Songs of 2011, while staff members of NPR Music placed the song on their list of 100 Favorite Songs of 2011. Staff members of Rap-Up magazine placed "Look at Me Now" at number four on their list of the 10 Best Songs of 2011. At the 2011 BET Awards, "Look at Me Now" won Best Collaboration and Viewer's Choice. It also won the People's Champ Award and Reese's Perfect Combo Award at the 2011 BET Hip Hop Awards. At the 2011 Soul Train Music Awards, the song was nominated for Best Hip-Hop Song of the Year. "Look at Me Now" was nominated for Best Rap Performance and Best Rap Song at the 54th Grammy Awards.

== Chart performance ==
In the United States, "Look at Me Now" debuted at number 62 on the Hot R&B/Hip-Hop Songs chart dated January 29, 2011. After spending nine weeks on the chart, the song peaked at number one in the issue dated April 2, 2011, where it remained for eight consecutive weeks. It also reached number one on the US Hot Rap Songs chart, and became Brown's first number-one single on the chart as a lead artist. He previously topped the chart in 2006 as a featured artist on Bow Wow's "Shortie Like Mine". On the US Billboard Hot 100 chart, "Look at Me Now" debuted at number eleven in the issue dated February 19, 2011. It later peaked at number six and became Brown's highest charting effort on the Hot 100 since "Forever", which had peaked at number two in 2008. The song also became Busta Rhymes' seventh top-ten Hot 100 hit and Lil Wayne's thirteenth. As of April 2014, "Look at Me Now" has sold over four million digital copies in the United States. On May 5, 2025, the single was certified Diamond by the Recording Industry Association of America (RIAA) for combined sales and streaming equivalent units of over ten million units, becoming Brown's second Diamond single.

In Australia, "Look at Me Now" debuted at number 75 on the ARIA Singles Chart dated March 7, 2011, and peaked at number 46 on May 9, 2011. The song was certified gold by the Australian Recording Industry Association (ARIA), denoting sales of 35,000 copies. In New Zealand, the song entered the New Zealand Singles Chart at number 39 on May 2, 2011 and peaked at number 37 the following week, and spent four weeks on the chart. In the United Kingdom, "Look at Me Now" debuted at number 57 on the UK Singles Chart and peaked at number 44, and spent a total of nine weeks on the chart. It also charted on the UK R&B Chart at number 13. In France, the song debuted at number 85 on the French Singles Chart and spent three consecutive weeks on the chart, becoming the only European country where the song charted.

== Track listing ==
- Digital download
1. "Look at Me Now" (Explicit version) (featuring Busta Rhymes and Lil Wayne) – 3:43
2. "Look at Me Now" (Edited version) (ft. Busta Rhymes and Lil Wayne) – 3:43

== Credits and personnel ==
- Chris Brown – songwriter, lead vocals
- Thomas Wesley "Diplo" Pentz – songwriter, producer
- Jean Baptiste – songwriter
- Ryan Buendia – songwriter
- Dwayne "Lil Wayne" Carter – songwriter, featured vocals
- Trevor "Busta Rhymes" Smith – songwriter, featured vocals
- Nick "Afrojack" van de Wall – songwriter, producer
- Free School – co-producer
- Brian Stanley – audio mixing
- Mike Layos – assistant audio mixing
- Ryan Kelly – assistant audio mixing

Credits adapted from the liner notes for F.A.M.E.

== Charts ==
=== Weekly charts ===
Weekly chart performance for "Look at Me Now"
Chart (2011)	Peak position
Australia (ARIA)	46
Australia Urban (ARIA)	15
Canada Hot 100 (Billboard)	51
France (SNEP)	85
New Zealand (Recorded Music NZ)	37
UK Hip Hop/R&B (Official Charts)	13
UK Singles (Official Charts)	44
US Billboard Hot 100	6
US Hot R&B/Hip-Hop Songs (Billboard)	1
US Hot Rap Songs (Billboard)	1
US Pop Airplay (Billboard)	29
US Rhythmic Airplay (Billboard)	1

=== Year-end charts ===
Year-end chart performance for "Look at Me Now"
Chart (2011)	Position
US Billboard Hot 100	21
US Hot R&B/Hip-Hop Songs (Billboard)	3
US Rap Songs (Billboard)	1
US Rhythmic (Billboard)	9

=== Decade-end charts ===
Decade-end chart performance for "Look at Me Now"
Chart (2010–2019)	Position
US Hot R&B/Hip-Hop Songs (Billboard)	31

== Certifications ==
Certifications and sales for "Look at Me Now"
Region	Certification	Certified units/sales
Australia (ARIA)	2× Platinum	140,000^{^}
New Zealand (RMNZ)	2× Platinum	60,000^{‡}
Norway (IFPI Norway)	Platinum	10,000^{*}
United Kingdom (BPI)	Gold	400,000^{‡}
United States (RIAA)	Diamond	10,000,000^{‡}
Streaming
Denmark (IFPI Danmark)	Gold	900,000^{†}
^{*} Sales figures based on certification alone.^{^} Shipments figures based on certification alone.^{‡} Sales+streaming figures based on certification alone.^{†} Streaming-only figures based on certification alone.

== Radio and release history ==
Release dates and formats for "Look at Me Now"
Region	Date	Format
Australia	February 1, 2011	Digital download
Canada	February 1, 2011	Digital download
France	February 1, 2011	Digital download
Ireland	February 1, 2011	Digital download
Netherlands	February 1, 2011	Digital download
New Zealand	February 1, 2011	Digital download
Norway	February 1, 2011	Digital download
United States	February 1, 2011	Digital download
United States	February 8, 2011	Rhythmic contemporary radio
