= Paper, Scissors, Rock (song) =

2011 song by Chris Brown

Song by Chris Brown featuring Timbaland and Big Sean

from the album F.A.M.E.
- Released: March 18, 2011
- Genre: Alternative hip-hop; R&B; alternative rock
- Length: 3:46
- Label: Jive; CBE
- Songwriters: Timothy Mosley; James Fauntleroy II; Sean Anderson
- Producers: Timbaland; JRoc

Audio video
- "Paper, Scissors, Rock" on YouTube

"Paper, Scissors, Rock" is a song by American singer Chris Brown, taken from the deluxe edition of his fourth studio album F.A.M.E. (2011). The song features American rappers Timbaland and Big Sean. It was written by Timbaland, James Fauntleroy II and Big Sean, while its production was handled by Timbaland and Jerome Harmon. Musically, "Paper, Scissors, Rock" incorporates elements of hip hop, R&B, rock and electronic music. The song contains lyrics lamenting about a woman who doesn't know what she's got. "Paper, Scissors, Rock" garnered positive reviews from music critics, praising the song's production and performances.

== Development and composition ==
"Paper, Scissors, Rock" was written by Timbaland, James Fauntleroy II and Big Sean, and produced by Timbaland and Jerome Harmon. The song leaked on the internet ten days prior to F.A.M.E.'s release. Musically, "Paper, Scissors, Rock" mixes hip hop, R&B, rock and electronic music. The song's verses are performed by Timbaland and Big Sean, while Chris Brown performs the chorus, with his vocal performance being noted for its harmonization and Auto-Tuned vocals. The song's lyrics are "aimed at girls who play games", seeing each artist "trying to understand why their girls would throw away a good thing", lamenting about a woman who doesn't know what she's got. Timbaland handles vocals on the majority of the song, while Big Sean's verse was described as "trippy" and "stuttering". According to PopCrush, Brown on the chorus responds to "the charges being brought against [his] alleged heartbreaker". The song's production features a "heavy bassline", "plenty of whirring, beeping high-end electronic sounds bouncing around", and a "stomping piano" that provides "a heavy, rhythmic foundation" for it.

== Critical reception ==
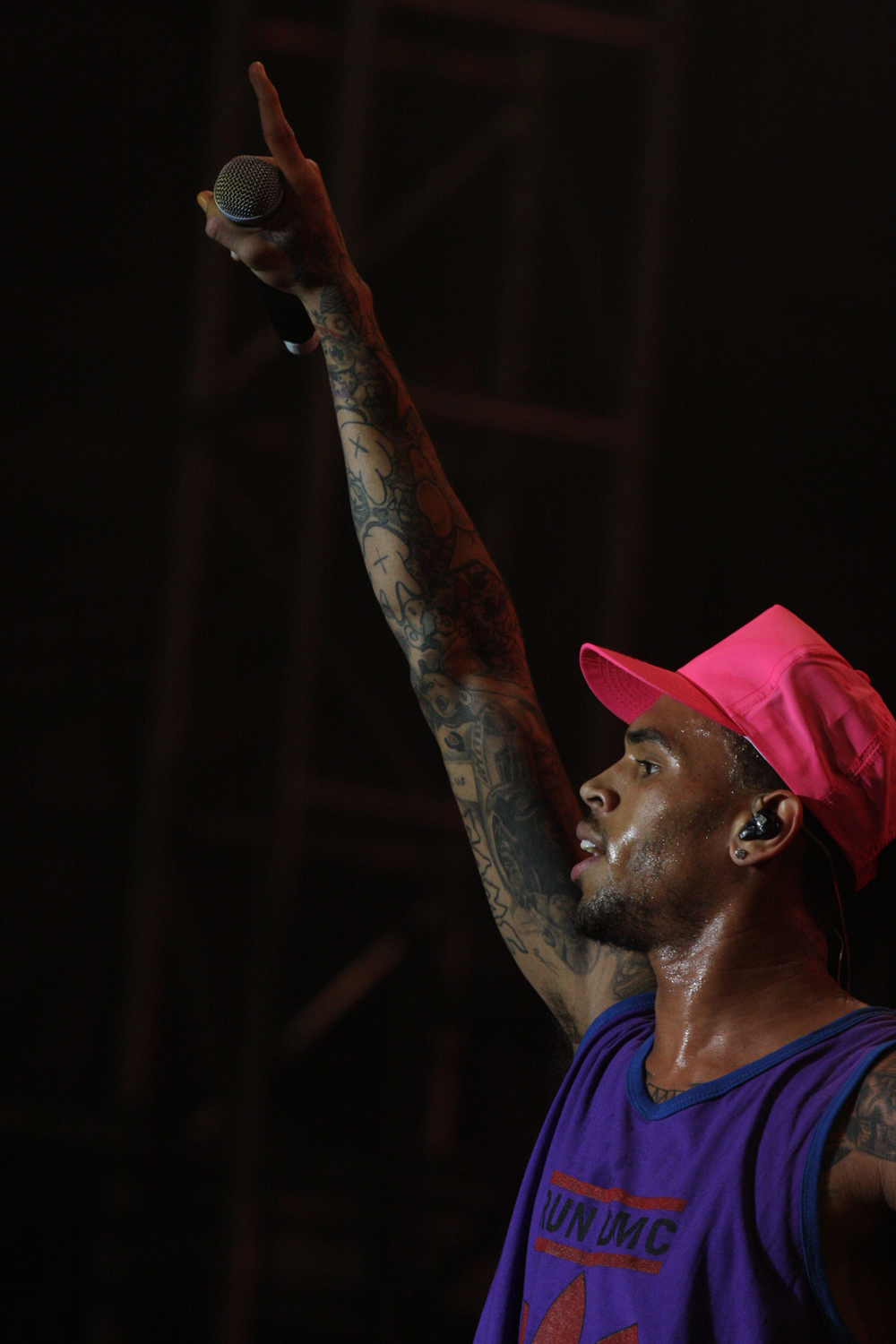
Brown's performance on the track was praised by critics.

"Paper, Scissors, Rock" garnered positive reviews from music critics. Joanne Dorken of MTV said that the track showcases Timbaland's "recognisable beats", praising its "catchy chorus" with "Chris bringing something different to your normal Timbaland produced tune", stating that it's "definitely worth checking out". HotNewHipHop wrote that "Paper, Scissors, Rock will undoubtedly improve [Chris Brown's] chances of winning". The Idolator claimed that it "sounds like a typical Timbaland track teased out a little bit", stating that the song is better than the "dance-friendly tunes" contained in Brown's previous album Graffiti.

== Live performances ==
"Paper, Scissors, Rock" was performed live by Chris Brown at the BET Awards 2011.

== Chart performance ==
Prior to the release of F.A.M.E., "Paper, Scissors, Rock" leaked on the internet, on March 8, 2011, making it debut at number 23 on the US Billboard Bubbling Under R&B/Hip-Hop Singles.

== Charts ==
Chart performance for "Paper, Scissors, Rock"
Chart (2011)	Peak position
US Billboard Bubbling Under R&B/Hip-Hop Singles	23
