= She Ain't You =

Single by Chris Brown

from the album F.A.M.E.
- Released: March 28, 2011
- Recorded: 2010
- Studio: Stadium Red Studios (New York City, New York)
- Genre: R&B
- Length: 4:08
- Label: Jive
- Songwriters: Quincy Jones; Chris Brown; Jean Baptiste; Ryan Buendia; Kevin McCall; Jason Boyd; John Bettis; Steve Porcaro; Brian Morgan
- Producer: Free School

Chris Brown singles chronology
"Best Love Song" (2011)	"She Ain't You" (2011)	"Next to You" (2011)

Music video
- "She Ain’t You" on YouTube

"She Ain't You" is a song by American singer Chris Brown. The mid-tempo R&B record was written by Brown, Jean Baptiste, Ryan Buendia, Kevin McCall and Jason Boyd, and was produced by Free School. It was sent to urban contemporary radio in the United States on March 28, 2011, as the fourth US single from Brown's fourth studio album, F.A.M.E. (2011). Musically, "She Ain't You" samples the remixed version of SWV's "Right Here" (1993), as well as Michael Jackson's "Human Nature" (1983). The song's lyrics are about Brown missing his ex-girlfriend while he is in a new relationship. "She Ain't You" received positive reviews from music critics who praised Brown's lyrical and vocal performance, as well as its production.

"She Ain't You" reached number five on the US Hot R&B/Hip-Hop Songs chart, number 17 on the US Pop Songs chart, and number 27 on the US Billboard Hot 100 chart. Although it was only officially released in the US, the song also charted in Australia, Canada, New Zealand, Slovakia and the United Kingdom. The accompanying music video was directed by Colin Tilley and features Brown paying tribute to Michael Jackson. Brown performed "She Ain't You" at the 2011 BET Awards, on Today, and during his F.A.M.E. Tour.

== Background and composition ==
"She Ain't You" was written by Shaun Malow, and was produced by Free School. It was recorded at Stadium Red Studios in New York City—and Brian Springer mixed the song at The Record Plant—a studio in Los Angeles, California. Springer was assisted by Iain Findlay and Mark Beaven. Sevyn Streeter of R&B girl group RichGirl performed background vocals on the song. The song was sent to urban contemporary radio in the United States on March 28, 2011. It also impacted rhythmic contemporary radio on April 19, 2011, and contemporary hit radio on May 31, 2011. A remix of "She Ain't You" featuring SWV premiered online on June 10, 2011.

"She Ain't You"
A 25-second audio sample of the song, containing lyrics about Brown realizing that he still has love for his ex-girlfriend, while trying to get over her.

"She Ain't You" is a mid-tempo R&B, pop-flavored ballad, that features electronic and calm beats. The song is set in common time with a moderate tempo of 92 beats per minute. It is composed in the key of G major with Brown's vocal range spanning from the note of B_{2} to the note of B_{4}. It also makes use of the drums. "She Ain't You" contains a portion of a remixed version of SWV's "Right Here" (1993), which in turn samples Michael Jackson's "Human Nature" (1982). According to Najah Goldstein of WNOW-FM, it is "reminiscent of a 90's R&B love song." According to Scott Shetler of AOL Music, on the song, "an hopeful Brown sings about missing his ex-girlfriend, while [in] a new relationship."

== Music video ==
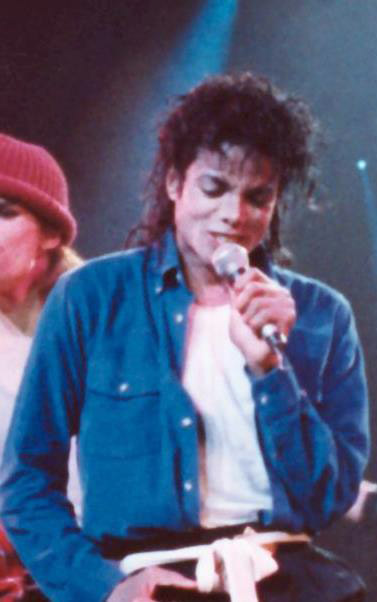
Brown's tribute to Michael Jackson was praised by critics.

The music video for "She Ain't You" was filmed on April 10, 2011, and was directed by Colin Tilley, and premiered on VEVO on April 29, 2011. Throughout the video, Brown pays tribute to Michael Jackson, and as stated by Lewis Corner of Digital Spy, "Brown has also choreographed a selection of iconic Jackson-inspired moves for the song's dance routine." The video opens with the following dedication, "Dedicated to my biggest inspiration of all time ... I Love You. R.I.P. Michael Jackson. 08/29/58 – 06/25/09." Brown then appears in a 1980s-styled white suit and a black fedora, performing choreography with male and female dancers against a wall of neon lights. Brown's outfit was noted for its similarities to the one Jackson wore in his music video for "Smooth Criminal" (1988). In between these scenes, Brown can also be seen wearing a black suit while dancing in front of a backdrop of dark clouds. Sevyn Streeter and Brown appear separately during the song's chorus where they are surrounded by gold butterflies. More scenes of Brown performing choreography are shown during the second verse. He also appears outdoors splashing in a pool of water. The video ends showing Brown flying through the air.

A writer for Rap-Up wrote that the video showcased what Brown does best – "dance". Anthony Osei of Complex magazine wrote, "If anyone can do a great Michael Jackson tribute, it's Chris Brown." A writer of DesiHits wrote that the video brought the "same magic" from his tribute to Jackson at the 2010 BET Awards, and added that it included "great lighting and even better choreography." Robbie Daw of Idolator found the video "mildly enjoyable". Brad Wete of Entertainment Weekly called Brown's dancing "tremendous" and wrote, "You'd be hard pressed trying to find a singer out there with enough dancing abilities to even attempt a proper Jackson tribute. Brown is one of the few—if not the only." At the 2011 Soul Train Music Awards, the video was nominated for Best Dance Performance.

== Live performances ==
On June 26, 2011, Brown performed "She Ain't You" along with "Look at Me Now" and "Paper, Scissors, Rock" at the 2011 BET Awards. The performance started off with Brown performing "She Ain't You" in a gray suit with voluminous pant legs and a cape fashioned out of a jacket. He then switched his outfit to a black jumpsuit and performed "Look at Me Now", as a group of dancers in similarly street black hoodies joined him on stage. Busta Rhymes later appeared from a brightly lit cube flanked by dancers in eerie, transparent masks illuminated by blinking lights. Brown ended the performance with "Paper, Scissors, Rock". On July 15, 2011, Brown performed "She Ain't You" in front of an audience of 18,000 people at the Rockefeller Plaza in New York City as part of Today concert series. For the performance, Brown wore a white shirt and a black and gold vest with black pants. "She Ain't You" was added to the set list of Brown's F.A.M.E. Tour in North America.

== Critical reception ==
Sarah Rodman of The Boston Globe wrote that the song "is totally shameless and completely effective" as it "derives much of its charm from a hefty sample of Michael Jackson's 'Human Nature'". Joanne Dorken of MTV UK wrote that the sample gives "the tune an instant eighties feel". Najah Goldstein of radio station WNOW-FM wrote that the song "shows a much softer side of Chris Brown", and further added that it's "definitely a song for the ladies ... maybe even for pop star Rihanna." Margaret Wappler of Los Angeles Times wrote that "the sentiment of the song is refreshingly complex." While reviewing the album, Sean Fennessey of The Washington Post wrote that "a more appropriate application appears on 'She Ain’t You', which interpolates Michael Jackson's 'Human Nature'. Jackson has long been the emotional, physical and musical forebear to Brown. But on 'She Ain’t You' he begs the comparison, and it isn’t pretty." The song was nominated for Song of the Year at the 2011 Soul Train Music Awards, and Top R&B Song at the 2012 Billboard Music Awards.

== Chart performance ==
In the issue dated April 2, 2011, "She Ain't You" debuted at number 75 on the US Hot R&B/Hip Hop Songs chart. The song peaked at number five in the issue dated June 18, 2011, and spent twenty-four weeks on the chart. In the issue dated April 30, 2011, "She Ain't You" debuted at number 90 on the US Billboard Hot 100 chart, and peaked at number 27 in the issue dated August 6, 2011. Even though the song was only officially released in the US, it still managed to chart in other countries. On the Australian Singles Chart, "She Ain't You" debuted at number 34 on June 13, 2011, and peaked at number 27. The song was certified gold by the Australian Recording Industry Association (ARIA), denoting sales of 35,000 copies. On the New Zealand Singles Chart, "She Ain't You" debuted at number 37, peaked at number 27, and spent a total of seven weeks on the chart. In the United Kingdom, the song debuted at number 90 on the UK Singles Chart dated October 15, 2011, and peaked at number 53 on November 12, 2011. It also charted on the UK R&B Singles Chart, where it peaked at number 17.

== Credits and personnel ==
Credits adapted from the liner notes for F.A.M.E..

- Chris Brown – lead vocals, songwriter
- Shaun Malow – songwriter
- Mark Beaven – assistant audio mixing
- Jason Boyd – songwriter
- Iain Findlay – assistant audio mixing
- Free School – producer
- Brian Springer – audio mixing
- Amber Streeter//Shaun Malow – background vocals
- Phil Consorti - Assistant Engineer Stadium Red Studios

== Charts ==
=== Weekly charts ===
Weekly chart performance for "She Ain't You"
Chart (2011)	Peak position
Australia (ARIA)	27
Australia Urban (ARIA)	8
Canada Hot 100 (Billboard)	80
New Zealand (Recorded Music NZ)	27
Slovakia Airplay (Rádio Top 100 Oficiálna)	56
UK Hip Hop/R&B (Official Charts)	17
UK Singles (Official Charts)	53
US Billboard Hot 100	27
US Adult R&B Songs (Billboard)	15
US Hot R&B/Hip-Hop Songs (Billboard)	5
US Pop Airplay (Billboard)	17
US Rhythmic Airplay (Billboard)	7

=== Year-end charts ===
2011 year-end chart performance for "She Ain't You"
Chart (2011)	Rank
US Billboard Hot 100	89
US Hot R&B/Hip-Hop Songs	10
US Rhythmic Songs	31

== Certifications ==
Certifications for "She Ain't You"
Region	Certification	Certified units/sales
Australia (ARIA)	Platinum	70,000^{^}
New Zealand (RMNZ)	Platinum	30,000^{‡}
United Kingdom (BPI)	Silver	200,000^{‡}
United States (RIAA)	2× Platinum	2,000,000^{‡}
^{^} Shipments figures based on certification alone.^{‡} Sales+streaming figures based on certification alone.

== Release dates ==
Country	Date	Format	Label
United States	March 28, 2011	Urban contemporary radio	Jive Records
United States	April 19, 2011	Rhythmic contemporary radio	Jive Records
United States	May 31, 2011	Contemporary hit radio	Jive Records
