= Carpe Diem Tour =

2012 concert tour by Chris Brown

- Tour by Chris Brown
- Promotional poster for the tour
- Associated album: Fortune
- Start date: November 14, 2012
- End date: December 30, 2012
- Legs: 3
- No. of shows: 20

Chris Brown concert chronology
- F.A.M.E. Tour (2011); Carpe Diem Tour (2012); Between the Sheets Tour (2015)

The Carpe Diem Tour was a headlining concert tour by American singer Chris Brown, in support of his fifth studio album Fortune. The tour included shows in Europe, Africa, Asia, and Trinidad. It began on November 14, 2012 in Denmark and ended on December 30, 2012 in Ivory Coast.

== Background ==
In May 2012, boy band The Wanted revealed to Capital FM that Brown was planning to launch a tour in the United States in July of the same year to support his fifth studio album, Fortune, and that there was a possibility they could be one of the supporting acts for the tour. Tom Parker, a member of the band, stated: "There's talk about us, he's got his American tour coming up in July, maybe we'll go on that for a few shows which will be cool". However, details for a tour were not announced until September 25, 2012, when twelve dates for European venues were revealed. An extra date for the European leg was announced on September 26, 2012. The African tour dates were announced on September 28, 2012.

== Setlist ==
The following set list is representative of the show on December 5, 2012. It is not representative of all concerts for the duration of the tour.

1. "Beautiful People"
2. "I Can Only Imagine"
3. "Forever"
4. "She Ain't You"
5. "Take It to the Head"
6. "Birthday Cake"
7. "Take You Down"
8. "Biggest Fan"
9. "2012"
10. "No Bullshit"
11. "I Can Transform Ya"
12. "Bassline"
13. "Look At Me Now"
14. "Deuces"
15. "All Back"
16. "Don't Judge Me"
17. "Yeah 3x"
18. "Don't Wake Me Up"
19. "Turn Up The Music"

== Dates ==
Date	City	Country	Venue
Europe
November 14, 2012	Copenhagen	Denmark	Forum Copenhagen
November 17, 2012	Oslo	Norway	Oslo Spektrum
November 19, 2012	Stockholm	Sweden	Ericsson Globe
November 22, 2012	Berlin	Germany	O_{2} World
November 23, 2012	Stuttgart	Germany	Hanns-Martin-Schleyer-Halle
November 27, 2012	Dortmund	Germany	Westfalenhallen
November 29, 2012	Frankfurt	Germany	Festhalle
November 30, 2012	Basel	Switzerland	St. Jakobshalle
December 3, 2012	Dublin	Ireland	The O_{2}
December 5, 2012	Antwerp	Belgium	Sportpaleis
December 6, 2012	Amsterdam	Netherlands	Ziggo Dome
December 7, 2012	Paris	France	Palais Omnisports de Paris-Bercy
December 9, 2012	Paris	France	Palais Omnisports de Paris-Bercy
Asia
December 11, 2012	Dubai	United Arab Emirates	Meydan Racecourse
Africa
December 15, 2012	Johannesburg	South Africa	Coca-Cola Dome
December 17, 2012	Durban	South Africa	Moses Mabhida Stadium
December 19, 2012	Cape Town	South Africa	Grand West Arena
December 20, 2012	Cape Town	South Africa	Grand West Arena
December 30, 2012	Abidjan	Ivory Coast	Stade Félix Houphouët-Boigny

== Personnel ==
- Choreography – Anwar "Flii Stylz" Burton, Christopher Brown, Richmond "Rich" Talauega and Anthony "Tone" Talauega
- Creative direction – Anwar "Flii Stylz" Burton, Josh Thomas and Christopher Brown
- Art direction – Shaun Harrison
- Graphic Designer – Cooper Sebastian
- Stage director – Steven Bryson
- Production manager – Michael "Huggy" Carter
- Stylist – Seth Chernoff
- Dancers – Kento Mori, Mona Berntsen, Hefa Leone Tuita, J.D Rainey, Jack Fletcher, Roi Chen, Devon Perri, Timor Steffens, Taja Riley, Randi Kemper, Eyal (Pipo) Layani, Ragon Miller and Alexandria Kaye-Upshur
- DJ – DJ Babey Drew
