= Till I Die (Chris Brown song) =

Single by Chris Brown featuring Big Sean and Wiz Khalifa

from the album Fortune
- Released: April 13, 2012
- Recorded: 2011–12
- Genre: Hip hop; West Coast hip hop
- Length: 3:57
- Label: RCA
- Songwriters: Chris Brown; Sean Anderson; Cameron Thomaz; Marcella Araica; Nathaniel "Danja" Hills
- Producer: Danja

Chris Brown singles chronology
"Sweet Love" (2012)	"Till I Die" (2012)	"I Can Only Imagine" (2012)

Big Sean singles chronology
"Mercy" (2012)	"Till I Die" (2012)	"My Homies Still" (2012)

Wiz Khalifa singles chronology
"I'm On" (2011)	"Till I Die" (2012)	"Payphone" (2012)

Music video
- "Till I Die" on YouTube

"Till I Die" is a song by American singer Chris Brown featuring American rappers Big Sean and Wiz Khalifa. It was written by the artists alongside Marcella Araica and producer Danja. "Till I Die" was released digitally on April 13, 2012, as the third single from Brown's fifth studio album, Fortune (2012). It was sent to rhythmic contemporary radio in the United States on May 1, 2012. "Till I Die" is an uptempo hip hop song that displays elements of electro music and features military drumbeats, R&B synths and "arcade-game blips". The song contains lyrics about women, smoking weed, partying in the club and living the good life.

"Till I Die" garnered positive reviews from music critics, who praised the production and the trio's verses. Although it was released worldwide, the song only charted in the United States. It peaked at number twelve on the Hot R&B/Hip-Hop Songs chart, and number fifteen on the Rap Songs chart. The accompanying music video for "Till I Die" was directed by Brown and features cameo appearances by Snoop Dogg, Andy Milonakis, Kreayshawn, Jamie Kennedy, Method Man and Redman. The video was dedicated to Beastie Boys' member Adam Yauch, who died from cancer in May 2012. Brown included "Till I Die" in his set list at Supafest Australia.

== Background and composition ==
"Till I Die" was written by Cameron Jabril Thomaz, Chris Brown, Marcella Araica, Nathaniel "Danja" Hills and Sean Anderson, while production was handled by Danja. The audio mixing was completed by Jaycen Joshua, with assistance by Trehy Harris. On March 28, 2012, Brown announced via his official Twitter account that he would be releasing "Till I Die" and "Sweet Love" as the next two singles from Fortune, after the lead single "Turn Up the Music". The audio of "Till I Die" and its artwork were posted online on April 10, 2012, showing Brown wearing a navy blue suit and sunglasses, and standing beside a motorcycle in front of a neon-glowing backdrop. It was released as a one-track digital download in Oceania and most European countries on April 13, 2012. However, in the United States, "Till I Die" was released digitally on April 17, 2012, and sent to rhythmic contemporary radio on May 1, 2012.

"Till I Die" is an uptempo hip hop and R&B song, which last for a duration of three minutes and 57 seconds. The song blends military drumbeats and R&B synths with elements of electro music. Trent Fitzgerald of PopCrush noted that it also uses "arcade-game blips". According to Lewis Corner of Digital Spy, "Till I Die" opens with a "dubstep intro". Throughout the song, Brown, Big Sean and Wiz Khalifa rap about "smoking and intoxication", "women and weed", "partying and balling in the club", and living the good life. During the first verse, Brown references American politician Sarah Palin in the line "Sippin and I'm faded / Super medicated / Said she wanna check the poll / I said ok Sarah Palin". Rob Markman of MTV News noted that Brown harmonizes the line "I'm high" in the background.

== Music video ==
=== Background ===
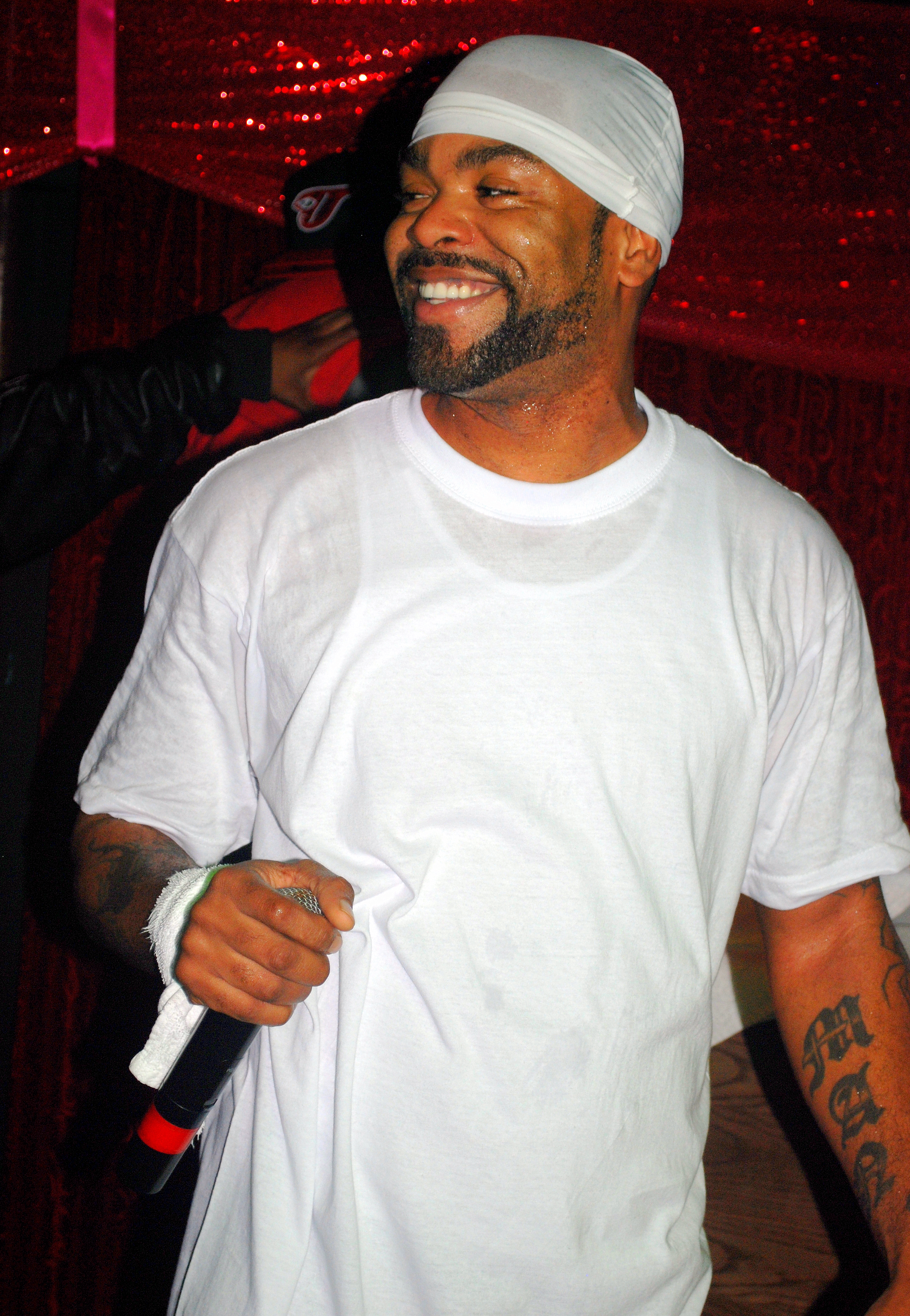
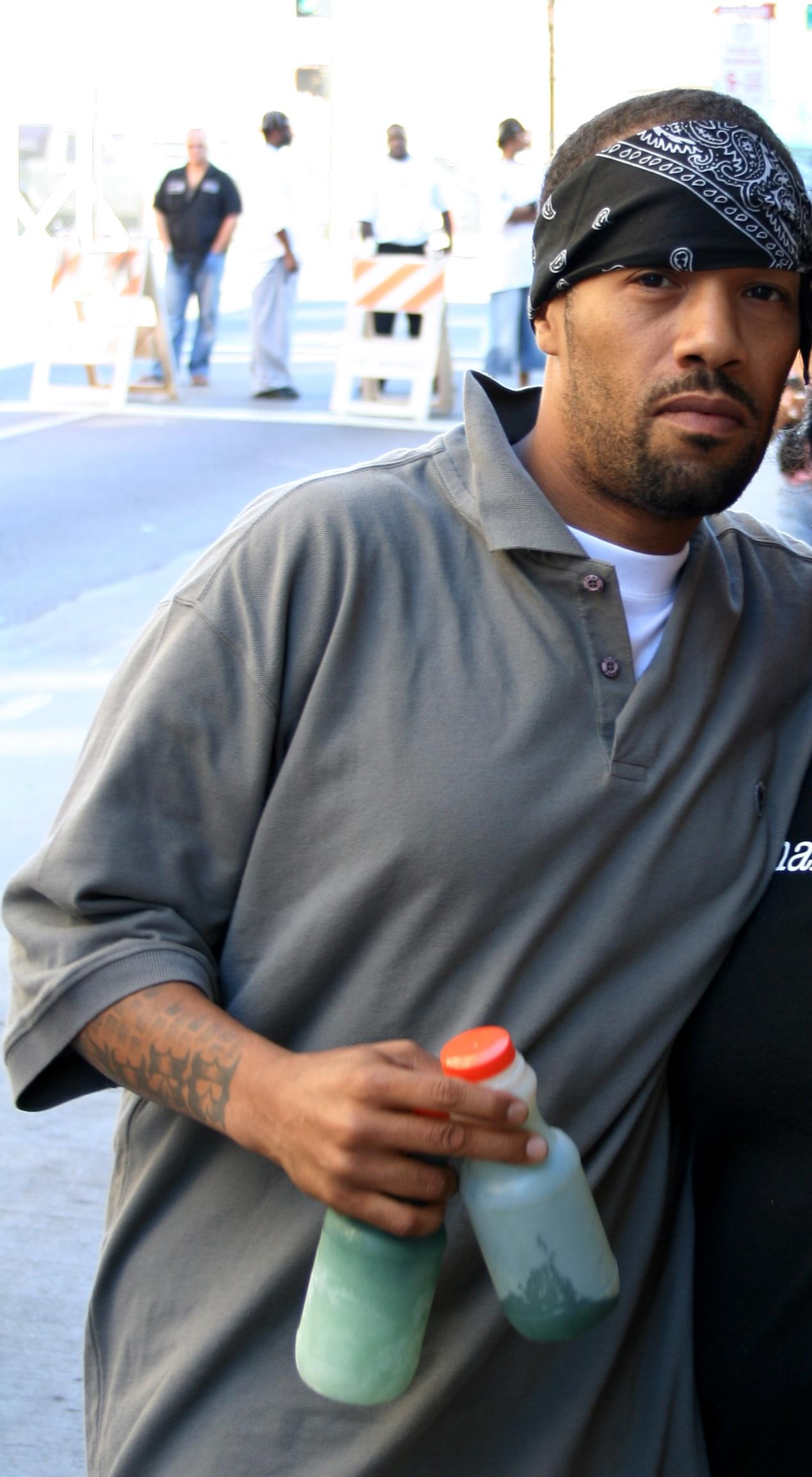
Method Man (left) and Redman (right) are two of the many celebrities who make an appearance in the video.

The accompanying music video for "Till I Die" was directed by Brown and filmed in Los Angeles, California on May 10, 2012. Later that day, several images from the shoot were posted online, showing Brown, Big Sean and Wiz Khalifa sitting on top of a yellow car, as well as images of the latter two posing shirtless. The video premiered online on May 30, 2012. Following its release, Brown tweeted that the video is dedicated to Beastie Boys' member Adam Yauch, who died from cancer in early May 2012. The video features cameo appearances by Andy Milonakis, Kreayshawn, Jamie Kennedy, Snoop Dogg, Method Man and Redman.

=== Synopsis ===
The video begins in an office with the mail guy (played by Kennedy), handing out mail to co-workers, while Brown's song "Beautiful People" plays in the background. As the audio of "Till I Die" begins, Brown, wearing a grey suit, beanie, gold fronts and gold chains, appears out of nowhere tripping the mail guy, and starts rapping his verse. He then appears in an elevator where he meets Wiz Khalifa and Big Sean, who then raps his verse. As they leave work, the trio catch a ride with Snoop Dogg in his yellow Pontiac Parisienne, as Sean continues rapping his verse. This scene is intercut with scenes of them hanging out in an abandoned warehouse surrounded by smoke and flashing lights. Khalifa then raps his verse as they arrive at a mansion where Method Man and Redman are seen smoking. The video ends with more scenes of the trio back at the abandoned warehouse and shows the memory to Adam Yauch.

=== Reception ===
Bene Viera of VH1 praised Brown "for creating a video that fits perfectly with the song". Viera continued writing that the song "wouldn't be [a] proper smoker's anthem" without the cameo appearance by Snoop Dogg. Rob Markman of MTV News noted that the video was different from Brown's previous music videos for the Fortune album, writing that "'Till I Die' is a fun and welcomed departure from it all". A reviewer for Rap-Up described the video as "wild" and "colorful", and noted that it seems to be inspired by the Beastie Boys' classic "(You Gotta) Fight for Your Right (To Party!)" (1987). Ray Rahman of Entertainment Weekly called the video "a weird one". Becky Bain of Idolator described it as "the brats-on-parade clip", and wrote that the dedication to Yauch "would be a nice sentiment if anything in this video resembled anything Yauch stood for". Maura Johnston of The Village Voice called it a "dumb" video and wrote that it reminded her of the "Our Lips Are Sealed" video by The Go-Go's.

== Live performances ==
Brown performed "Till I Die" for the first time with Big Sean at Supafest Australia in April 2012, as part of a set list which included "Run It!", "Yeah 3x", "Look at Me Now", "She Ain't You", "Wet the Bed" and "Turn Up the Music", among others. Rap-Up praised his set, writing that "A tatted Chris Brown thrilled with his chart-topping hits". The staff of Dolly magazine called it "one of his most electrifying performances" to date.

== Critical response ==
"Till I Die" garnered positive reviews from music critics. Becky Bain of Idolator appreciated the "nice blend of electro and R&B" music in the song, writing that it "has a unique sound that's both experimental and easy to lay back to". Andrew Martin of Complex magazine described "Till I Die" as a "laid-back, summer-primed production", while Becca Longmire of Entertainment Wise viewed it as a potential hit. Trent Fitzgerald of PopCrush complimented the song for having a "nice R&B groove" and added that "it will certainly get some spins on urban radio". Bene Viera of VH1 praised Brown's verse, writing that "he's seriously going to make some rappers step up their game". Hazel Robinson of California Literary Review magazine called it one of the many "excellent collaborations" on Fortune.

Maura Johnston of The Village Voice wrote that the song "sounds like a reverse-engineered version" of American pop duo Karmin's cover of "Look at Me Now" (2011), and further explained that it contains "lyrics to prove that he's still a badass". Melinda Newman of HitFix described "Till I Die" as "pot hazy". In a review of Fortune, Barry Walters of Spin magazine wrote that "Till I Die", along with "Sweet Love" and "Don't Wake Me Up", contain "thin melodies and stock shock lyrics" that make Brown's previous singles sound better. He described the song as "proudly stoned". Melissa Ruggieri of The Atlanta Journal-Constitution noted that "Big Sean and Wiz Khalifa trade the most profane verses" in the song.

== Chart performance ==
In the United States, "Till I Die" debuted at number 74 on the Hot R&B/Hip-Hop Songs chart in the issue dated April 28, 2012. It peaked at number twelve in the issue dated August 11, 2012. On the Rap Songs chart, the song debuted at number 25 in the issue dated June 23, 2012, and peaked at number fifteen in the issue dated August 11, 2012. "Till I Die" peaked at number one on the Bubbling Under Hot 100 Singles chart, which represents the 25 songs which failed to chart on the Billboard Hot 100.

== Track listing ==
- Digital download
1. "Till I Die" (featuring Big Sean and Wiz Khalifa) – 3:57

== Credits and personnel ==
Credits adapted from the liner notes for Fortune

- Marcella Araica – songwriter
- Chris Brown – lead vocals, songwriter
- Iain Findley – assistant recorder
- Trehy Harris – assistant mixer
- Nathaniel "Danja" Hills – songwriter, producer
- Jaycen Joshua – mixer
- Wiz Khalifa – guest vocals, songwriter
- Big Sean – guest vocals, songwriter
- Brian Springer – recorder

== Charts ==
=== Weekly charts ===
Weekly chart performance for "Till I Die"
Chart (2012)	Peak position
US Bubbling Under Hot 100 (Billboard)	1
US Digital Song Sales (Billboard)	68
US Hot R&B/Hip-Hop Songs (Billboard)	12
US Rhythmic Airplay (Billboard)	38

=== Year-end charts ===
2012 year-end chart performance for "Till I Die"
Chart (2012)	Position
US Hot R&B/Hip-Hop Songs	85

== Certifications ==
Certifications for "Till I Die"
Region	Certification	Certified units/sales
United States (RIAA)	Gold	500,000^{‡}
^{‡} Sales+streaming figures based on certification alone.

== Release history ==
Country	Date	Format	Label
Australia	April 13, 2012	Digital download	RCA Records
Austria	April 13, 2012	Digital download	RCA Records
Belgium	April 13, 2012	Digital download	RCA Records
Canada	April 13, 2012	Digital download	RCA Records
Denmark	April 13, 2012	Digital download	RCA Records
Finland	April 13, 2012	Digital download	RCA Records
France	April 13, 2012	Digital download	RCA Records
Italy	April 13, 2012	Digital download	RCA Records
Netherlands	April 13, 2012	Digital download	RCA Records
New Zealand	April 13, 2012	Digital download	RCA Records
Norway	April 13, 2012	Digital download	RCA Records
Portugal	April 13, 2012	Digital download	RCA Records
Spain	April 13, 2012	Digital download	RCA Records
Sweden	April 13, 2012	Digital download	RCA Records
Switzerland	April 13, 2012	Digital download	RCA Records
United States	April 17, 2012	Digital download	RCA Records
United States	May 1, 2012	Rhythmic contemporary radio	RCA Records
