= Fortune (Chris Brown album) =

- Standard cover. Deluxe cover has a purple background.

Studio album by Chris Brown
- Released: July 2, 2012
- Recorded: 2010–12
- Studios: The Record Plant (Los Angeles, California); Mason Sound (North Hollywood, Los Angeles, California); The Hit Factory Criteria (Miami, Florida); Chalice (Hollywood, California)
- Genres: R&B; pop; EDM
- Length: 54:53
- Labels: RCA; CBE
- Producers: Chris Brown; Adonis; Alle Benassi; Benny Benassi; Boi-1da; Brian Kennedy; Danja; Free School; Fuego; H-Money; Jason "JP" Perry; The Messengers; Polow da Don; Pop Wansel; The Runners; Tha Bizness; Tommy Hittz; The Underdogs; William Orbit

Chris Brown chronology
| F.A.M.E. (2011) | Fortune (2012) | X (2014) |

Singles from Fortune
- 1. "Turn Up the Music" Released: February 7, 2012; 2. "Sweet Love" Released: April 10, 2012; 3. "Till I Die" Released: April 13, 2012; 4. "Don't Wake Me Up" Released: May 18, 2012; 5. "Don't Judge Me" Released: August 14, 2012

Fortune is the fifth studio album by American singer Chris Brown. It was released in the UK on July 2, 2012, and in the US on July 3, 2012, through RCA Records. Production was handled by Brown himself and several record producers, including the Underdogs, Polow da Don, Brian Kennedy, the Runners, the Messengers, H-Money, Danja, and Benny Benassi. The album also features several guest appearances, including Big Sean, Wiz Khalifa, Nas, Sevyn Streeter, and Kevin McCall.

Originally scheduled for release six months after the release of Brown's fourth studio album F.A.M.E. on March 22, 2011, Fortune was pushed back several times before it was finally given a release date in July 2012. The album’s aesthetics feature heavy use of blue, suggesting a futuristic mood that distances itself from the graffiti imagery of Brown’s two previous albums. The music consists of R&B and pop, containing pronounced elements of electronic music, while the lyrical content concentrates on sex, promiscuity, hedonism, clubbing and romantic love. The album received generally negative reviews from music critics, several of whom panned the lyrical content, though some critics were complimentary towards the production. Despite the negative reception, it was nominated for Best Urban Contemporary Album at the 55th Grammy Awards.

Fortune had international chart success, debuting at number one on the US Billboard 200, selling 135,000 copies in its first week and becoming Brown's second number one album in the US, as well as his fifth consecutive top ten album. The album also debuted at number one in the UK, the Netherlands, and New Zealand, while fellow top ten positions were attained on charts in Switzerland, Scotland, Japan, Ireland, France, Canada and Australia.

Preceding the release of Fortune was the lead single "Turn Up the Music", which reached number ten on the US Billboard Hot 100, and number one on the UK Singles Chart. "Sweet Love" and "Till I Die" were released as the second and third singles, respectively. "Don't Wake Me Up" was released as the fourth single and reached the top ten in several countries. "Don't Judge Me" was released as the fifth and final single. To promote the album, Brown made several award show and televised appearances across America.

== Background and recording ==
Originally, Brown wanted his fourth studio album F.A.M.E. to be a double-disc, consisting of 25-30 tracks. However, Jive Records declined to release the album in that format, leading to a reduction to 13 tracks. Following the release of F.A.M.E., Brown planned a sequel titled Fortune, intended as a new album featuring new material along with songs recorded during the F.A.M.E. sessions, planning on releasing it six months after the previous album. Ultimately, he chose to invest more time into developing Fortune as a standalone project.

Work for Fortune began in mid-2011, with Kevin McCall revealing that he had been collaborating "heavily" with Brown for an upcoming album. Later in September 2011, producer David Banner explained that the idea of the album was to create mostly material that reflected a more club-oriented style that would "change the way people look at R&B". On January 7, 2012, Brown tweeted that there were only two weeks left of recording sessions for the album: "Last two weeks of me finishing Fortune! I'm excited for all the fans to hear my real music". The tweet was soon followed up by another from Brown, with him tweeting: "Dub step records on my album sounding crazy!!!!". However, the tweet was later removed, suggesting that Brown gave away too many details about Fortune, and work on the album continued for some months. Brown later told MTV in June 2012 that with the album he wanted to "give different textures, expressing mostly fun and sex appeal, but also giving pieces of maturity at the same time". He also said that musically he wanted to create "a videogame-inspired, futuristic and electronic atmosphere", showcasing his R&B roots, along with hip-hop and pop flavors.

In addition to recording, it was revealed in January 2012 that Brown was in the studio working on the album with Asher Roth, Nas, Wiz Khalifa, will.i.am, and Kid Sister. In an interview with MTV News, producer Harvey Mason, Jr., half of production duo the Underdogs, who co-produced "Turn Up the Music", spoke more about the album, saying "The Fortune record is F.A.M.E to the next level. He's really being innovative with some of the music, taking pieces of other genres and integrating them into pop and R&B, which I think is really cool. Vocally, he sounds amazing; he's really, really coming into his own as a singer, as you'll hear in the song "Free Run" we did together". Producer Damon Thomas, the other half of the duo, added "The only way I can describe Chris and what he's doin' with this record that he's making is that he's this generation's Michael [Jackson]". On February 29, 2012, Brown tweeted "I hope this album will inspire all my fans to live life to the fullest". During a radio interview with Atlanta's Hot 107.9 in March 2012, rapper 2 Chainz revealed that he will be appearing as a guest vocalist on Fortune, however the track he was featured on did not make the final track listing. In May 2012, producer William Orbit stated that the track "Don't Wake Me Up" that he produced for Madonna's album MDNA (2012) was given to Brown for Fortune, despite Madonna wanting it, because of timing issues.

== Music and lyrics ==
Primarily, Fortune is an R&B and pop album. The album also includes elements of club music, such as EDM and dubstep. Following the dance-pop opener "Turn Up the Music", Fortune opens up with synth-rap infused songs like "Bassline", "Till I Die" and "Mirage". The album continues alternating R&B songs like "2012", "Sweet Love" and "Strip" with pop tracks like "Stuck on Stupid", "4 Years Old" and "Party Hard". The album's electronic elements are highlighted by the autotune vocal editing of different tracks, but mostly appear throughout its production. Notable examples include the house-driven track "Turn Up the Music"; the blend of electro synthesizers with R&B music on "Wait for You" and "Sweet Love"; the electropop production of "Remember My Name"; the pronounced EDM characteristics of "Don't Wake Me Up" and the dancehall-infused "Trumpet Lights"; and the dubstep instrumentation of "Key 2 Your Heart" and "Bassline".

Lyrically, Fortune includes several songs about sexual encounters, most notably "2012", "Tell Somebody", "Biggest Fan" and "Sweet Love". The character that Brown portrays for the majority of the album is a narcissistic one, who brags about his favorite qualities, as well as his lifestyle, emphasizing how these things ensure him the attraction of women. Romantic adventures are spoken by Brown throughout the album on tracks like "Free Run" and "Stuck on Stupid", where he sets aside his braggadocio, to open up about his love for another. Other episodes of vulnerability on the album are "4 Years Old", where he reflects on how his richness and fame can't compare to the thought of love, and "Don't Wake Me Up", which finds Brown clinging to a past love, which he can now only experience while he's asleep. As well as explicit sex, vanity and genuine love, the lyrical content of Fortune also focuses on clubbing, main theme of songs like "Turn Up the Music", "Trumpet Lights" and "Till I Die".

== Artwork ==
The album's official cover (standard version) was revealed on February 29, 2012. The cover art was shot in January of the same year by the photography team Steven Gomillion and Dennis Leupold. On the album cover, a light shines down on Brown, who poses against a blue backdrop, dressed in a blue "sleek, slim-fitting suit with a skinny tie and thick black framed glasses", while the word "Fortune" appears behind him in different languages. Brown and his art director Courtney Walter came up with the idea of using hieroglyphics for the album's title. In an interview by telephone with Erik Parker of CBS Local, Gomillion said Brown "knew before the last album came out what this one would look like. He thinks so far ahead". Regarding the use of the color blue, Gomillion said "The funny thing about that blue is it basically just happened. It matched the suit and it gives a kind of futuristic vibe. You'll see blue throughout the [album] packaging". Sarah Brotherton of MTV News wrote that the cover shows "a more mature, sleek side" to Brown. Becky Bain of Idolator noted that Brown "seems to have finally dropped his beloved graffiti imagery and is going for a futuristic vibe". A reviewer for Rap-Up described it as a "slick cover". Alex Loinaz of E! Online compared Brown's look to that of actors Keanu Reeves in The Matrix films, and Colin Firth in A Single Man (2009).

== Release ==
In January 2011, Brown told fans on Twitter that he was planning on releasing his then studio album, F.A.M.E. (2011), as a double disc because he recorded too many songs for one disc and therefore planned on releasing a second disc titled, Fortune. However, during a listening party for F.A.M.E. on March 14, 2011, Brown announced that he would be releasing the Fortune disc in six months. He later decided to prolong its working, consequently postponing its release. In May 2011, the songs "Fools With You" and "Treading Waters" leaked on the internet, with Brown revealing his intention to put those tracks on the album, by tweeting: "Another song from Fortune was leaked! I'm not leaking the records! Hope y'all like it!". In July, another track that was supposed to be on the record, titled "Open Road (I Love Her)", was leaked, with the singer later tweeting: "If the whole song doesn’t leak then it’s going on Fortune! I have so many songs that I’ve recorded in my opinion that are sick. I just really hope people appreciate the diversity on Fortune". On August 23, 2011, RCA Music Group announced it was disbanding Jive Records along with Arista Records and J Records. With the shutdown, Fortune is now being released on the RCA Records brand. During an interview with Rap-Up magazine in September 2011, Kevin McCall revealed that the album was being pushed back for an early 2012 release. Then two months later, Jive Records France announced via Twitter that the album would be released in March 2012. On October 27, 2011, Brown announced via his official Twitter account that "Strip" and "Biggest Fan" would serve as the two lead singles from Fortune. However, "Biggest Fan" was not released as a single, and "One Of Those Nights" featuring will.i.am, was planned to be released as the following single on January 31, 2012, but ended up never being released. Following the online premiere of "Turn Up the Music" on January 26, 2012, several websites, including MTV News and Billboard magazine, reported that this would be the lead single from the album, while "Strip" served as a buzz single. In February 2012, the initial tracklist of the album was announced. On March 1, 2012, RCA Records confirmed that Fortune would be released in the US on May 8, 2012, as both standard and deluxe editions. A delay was announced in April. The official track listing for both the standard and deluxe editions of Fortune was revealed on May 29, 2012. The album was set to feature fourteen tracks on the standard edition, with an additional five tracks on the deluxe edition. On July 3, 2012, Fortune was released through RCA Records.

== Promotion ==
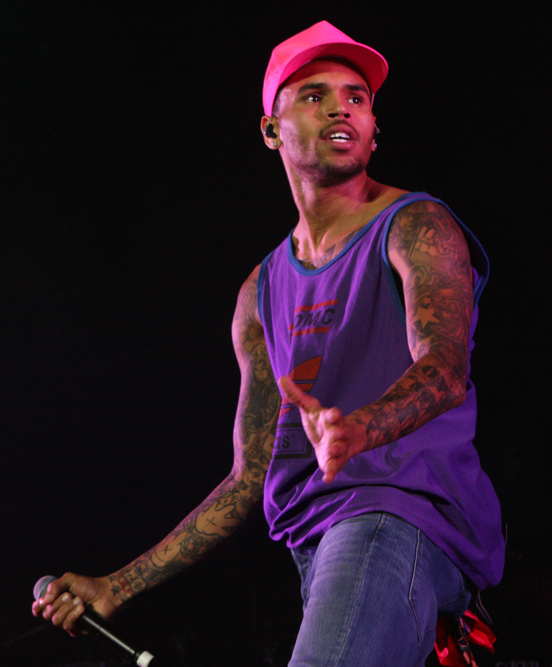
Brown performed a number of songs from the album live for the festival Supafest in 2012.

On November 18, 2011, "Strip", featuring Kevin McCall, was released as a buzz single for the album. The song achieved moderate success, reaching number 37 on the US Billboard Hot 100, and number three on the US Hot R&B/Hip-Hop Songs chart. In January 2012, Brown released the first promotional photo for Fortune, which showed him posing against a white backdrop, dressed in a full-length fur coat, black hoodie and jeans. At the 54th Grammy Awards, held at the Staples Center in Los Angeles, California on February 12, 2012, Brown performed a medley of "Turn Up the Music" and "Beautiful People". The performance featured Brown dressed in a white and gray varsity jacket, white pants and sparkling sneakers, performing heavily choreographed routines with several dancers, atop a collection of blocks. On February 26, 2012, he performed a truncated version of "Turn Up the Music" during the halftime show of the 2012 NBA All-Star Game in Orlando, Florida.

On March 2, 2012, Brown released the first episode of his Fortune web series, showing him backstage at the 2012 Lo Nuestro Awards where he performed "International Love" with Pitbull, playing in a celebrity basketball game during NBA All-Star Weekend in Orlando with rappers Common, 50 Cent, T.I., and singer R. Kelly, as well as partying and dancing at the club. In April 2012, Brown appeared in Australia as the headliner for the urban music festival, Supafest. His set list was composed of 18 songs: "I Can Transform Ya", "Wall to Wall", "Turn Up the Music", "Strip", "Till I Die", "Run It!", "Deuces", "Yeah 3x", "Look at Me Now", "Beautiful People", "She Ain't You", "Wet the Bed", "Take You Down", "My Last", "Leave the Club", "Forever", "Body 2 Body" and "Birthday Cake". On May 7, 2012, Brown released the second episode of his Fortune web series. On May 8, 2012, Brown appeared on Dancing with the Stars (US) to perform "Turn Up the Music". For the performance, Brown and his dancers wore suits. He later performed the song at the 2012 Billboard Music Awards, held at the MGM Grand Garden Arena in Paradise, Nevada on May 20, 2012. The performance featured projected images on the stage backdrop and BMX bike stunt troupes racing around the stage, as Brown performed choreographed routines while lip synching. His performance was met with a mixed response from celebrities, most notably Joe Jonas, Pink, and Carey Hart, who all criticized the singer for lip synching. On June 8, 2012, Brown appeared on NBC's Today show and performed "Turn Up the Music", "Don't Wake Me Up", "Yeah 3x" and "Forever", as part of the program's "Summer Concert Series".

At the 2012 BET Awards on July 1, 2012, he performed a medley of "Turn Up the Music" and "Don't Wake Me Up", and appeared shirtless for the performance with half his body spray painted in grey. Brown performed acrobatic moves with six backup dancers "under triangle-shaped beams" as green and red flashing lights appeared throughout the stage.

Brown embarked on his Carpe Diem Tour in November 2012 to further promote Fortune. The tour included 13 shows in Europe, five shows in Africa, and one show in Asia; this amounted to a total of 19 shows worldwide. Brown began the tour on November 14, 2012, with a show in Denmark, and ended it on December 27, 2012.

=== Advertising ===
On June 19, the R&B singer premiered his commercial for the project. The ad features a young Asian kid who walks into an abandoned warehouse and is confronted by shadowy figures. The mysterious shadows are in pursuit of a glowing cube nestled inside his backpack. The kid doesn't want them to have it so he defends himself against his attackers with a couple of acrobatic break-dancing moves. He then runs into a secret room where the glowing cube flies into the wall and unlocks a secret code, which reveals Chris Brown himself. The singer appears out of the wall and then absolves into the Fortune CD, which the amazed kid holds in hands.

== Singles ==
"Turn Up the Music" was released to contemporary hit radio in the US on February 7, 2012, as the album's lead single. Music critics gave "Turn Up the Music" positive reviews; they praised its production and compared the song to Brown's previous singles "Forever" (2008) and "Yeah 3x" (2010). "Turn Up the Music" peaked at number 10 on the US Billboard Hot 100 chart, becoming Brown's eleventh top ten single on the chart. It also reached the top ten in Australia and New Zealand, and peaked at number one in the UK, becoming Brown's first UK number one single.

"Sweet Love" was sent to US urban contemporary radio on April 10, 2012, as the second single from the album. The song reached number 89 on the US Billboard Hot 100 chart, and number 25 on the US Hot R&B/Hip-Hop Songs chart.

"Till I Die", featuring rappers Big Sean and Wiz Khalifa, was released to US rhythmic contemporary radio on May 1, 2012, as the third single from Fortune. "Till I Die" received positive reviews from music critics, most of whom praised the production. It peaked at number 17 on the US Rap Songs chart, and at number 14 on the US Hot R&B/Hip-Hop Songs chart.

"Don't Wake Me Up" was sent to US contemporary hit radio on June 12, 2012, as the album's fourth single. "Don't Wake Me Up" received positive reviews from music critics, who generally praised its production. It reached the top ten in Australia, Austria, Ireland, Japan, New Zealand, Norway and the UK. In the US, "Don't Wake Me Up" peaked at number 10 on the Billboard Hot 100 chart, becoming Brown's twelfth top ten single on the chart, and his second top ten single from Fortune, following "Turn Up the Music".

"Don't Judge Me" was sent to US urban contemporary radio on August 14, 2012, as the album's fifth single. The song peaked at number 21 on the US Hot R&B/Hip-Hop Songs chart, and at number 67 on the Billboard Hot 100 chart.

== Critical reception ==
Professional ratings
Aggregate scores
| Source | Rating |
|---|---|
| AnyDecentMusic? | 3.1/10 |
| Metacritic | 38/100 |
Review scores
| Source | Rating |
| AllMusic | 2/5 stars |
| BBC Music | 2/5 stars |
| Chicago Tribune | 2/4 stars |
| Entertainment Weekly | C− |
| Los Angeles Times | 2/4 stars |
| The Observer | 2/5 stars |
| HipHopDX | 3.5/5 stars |
| Rolling Stone | 2/5 stars |
| The Scotsman | 2/4 stars |
| Spin | 4/10 |

Fortune was met with generally negative reviews from music critics. At Metacritic, the album received an average score of 38, based on 14 reviews.

AllMusic's Andy Kellman criticized the album's lyrical content as "shameless" and found "few dimensions" in its music, calling it "an album of unapologetic swashbuckling" that is "saved ... from being a disaster" by some of its production. Kyle Anderson of Entertainment Weekly found the songwriting perfunctory and commented that the album "furthers the uncomfortable and frustrating disconnect between Brown's hotheaded personal life and his oddly edgeless musical persona". Jon Caramanica of The New York Times criticized Brown's "brazenness" and stated, "Listening to Mr. Brown at the deepest level balances aesthetic pleasures, when they happen, with superegolike self-protection against aligning oneself too closely with someone who's done such heinous things".

Hermione Hoby of The Observer panned the album's songs as "ugly stuff". Jesse Fairfax of HipHopDX found Fortune to be "a good album of grandiose self-assured posturing", but he said that it's "kind of below to what Brown could bring to the table". Evan Rytlewski of The A.V. Club criticized Brown's "no apologies mantra" but ended up saying that "The truth is in the eye of the beholder, and with easily accessible albums like Fortune, there will continue to be a lot of eyes on Chris Brown".

James Reed of The Boston Globe complimented "Don't Wake Me Up" as "a thumping club cut that's irresistible on an otherwise forgettable album". Barry Walters of Spin commented that, apart from "Don't Wake Me Up", Fortune "makes it easy for Chris Brown's haters and harder on his many fans", writing that "there's more than the usual number of midtempo ballads that once again mix sex-fantasy titillation with his defensiveness". Chicago Tribune writer Greg Kot called the album "a pure-pop candy cane, meant to be enjoyed, consumed and forgotten", commenting that "its mixture of smut, vulnerability, menace and dancefloor celebration". In a mixed review, Randall Roberts of the Los Angeles Times likened the album's trendy musical style to a product's shelf life and attributed it to "Brown's reflex of curbing his creative impulses at nearly every turn, with a few killer exceptions, and showing a conservatism unbecoming such a self-styled renegade".

=== Awards and nominations ===
Fortune garnered a nomination for Favorite Soul/R&B Album at the 2012 American Music Awards, but lost to Rihanna's Talk That Talk. The album was nominated for World's Best Album at the 2012 World Music Awards. It earned a nomination for Best Urban Contemporary Album at the 2013 Grammy Awards, though ultimately lost to Frank Ocean's Channel Orange. At the 2013 Billboard Music Awards, Fortune was nominated for Top R&B Album.

Awards and nominations for Fortune
| Year | Ceremony | Category | Result | Ref. |
|---|---|---|---|---|
| 2012 | American Music Awards | Favorite Soul/R&B Album | Nominated | |
| 2013 | Grammy Awards | Best Urban Contemporary Album | Nominated | |
| 2013 | Billboard Music Awards | Top R&B Album | Nominated | |
| 2014 | World Music Awards | World's Best Album | Nominated | |

== Commercial performance ==
The album entered at number one on the US Billboard 200, with first-week sales of 135,000 copies, giving Brown his second chart-topping album in the US. However, the first-week sales of Fortune were less than those of Brown's previous studio album F.A.M.E., which sold 270,000 copies and was also a chart topper. In its second week on the chart, Fortune experienced a 67% sales decrease, selling 45,000 copies, and the album descended three places to number four. The following week, the album fell out of the top ten, falling a further nine places to number 13, selling 26,600 copies in its third week. As of September 2012, Fortune has sold 303,600 copies in the US. It ranked as the 77th best-selling album of 2012 in the country. On March 25, 2016, the album was certified platinum by the Recording Industry Association of America (RIAA), for combined album sales and album-equivalent units of over one million in the US.

Fortune made its debut on the Irish Albums Chart at number four on July 5, 2012, marking Brown's third top-ten album in that country. In the Netherlands, the album debuted on the Dutch Albums Chart at number one on July 7, 2012, giving Brown his first chart-topping album in the country. Fortune debuted at number one on the UK Albums Chart for the issue date of July 14, 2012, selling 29,980 copies in its first week, and giving Brown his first UK number-one album. This stood as the first time that an R&B album reached number one in both the UK and US since Beyoncé's fourth solo studio album 4 did so in 2011. The album was ultimately certified gold by British Phonographic Industry (BPI) on January 17, 2014, for combined album sales and album-equivalent units of over 100,000 in the UK. Fortune debuted at number 9 on the Japanese Albums Chart, selling 9,922 copies for the week ending July 16, 2012. The album also debuted at number six on the Canadian Albums Chart and number 10 on the Swiss Albums Chart respectively. On the French Albums Chart, Fortune entered at number eight, selling 6,434 copies in its first week; this debut made it stand as Brown's first album to enter the top ten on the chart. The album peaked at number two on the ARIA Albums Chart, giving Brown his highest-charting album in Australia and was ultimately certified gold by the Australian Recording Industry Association (ARIA) in 2019 for exceeding 35,000 shipped copies. In New Zealand, Fortune debuted at number one on the New Zealand Albums Chart, becoming Brown's first number-one album in the country. On the Scottish Albums Chart, the album reached number two. Fortune debuted at number 13 on both the Danish Albums Chart and German Albums Chart.

== Track listing ==
Credits adapted from liner notes.

| No. | Title | Writer(s) | Producer(s) | Length |
|---|---|---|---|---|
| 1. | "Turn Up the Music" | Chris Brown; Harvey Mason Jr.; Michael Jimenez; Terence Coles | Fuego; The Underdogs | 3:48 |
| 2. | "Bassline" | Brown; Robert Calloway; Ronald "Flip" Colson; Andrea Simms | Pop & Oak; Dayvijae^{[a]} | 3:59 |
| 3. | "Till I Die" (featuring Big Sean and Wiz Khalifa) | Brown; Sean Anderson; Cameron Thomaz | Danja; Marcella Araica^{[a]} | 3:56 |
| 4. | "Mirage" (featuring Nas) | Brown; Nasir Jones; Eric Bellinger; Kevin McCall | H-Money; Brown^{[a]} | 4:17 |
| 5. | "Don't Judge Me" | Brown | The Messengers | 4:00 |
| 6. | "2012" | Brown; McCall | Adonis; McCall^{[a]} | 4:08 |
| 7. | "Biggest Fan" | Brown; Amber Streeter | The Runners; The Monarch^{[a]} | 3:59 |
| 8. | "Sweet Love" | Brown | Perry; Polow da Don | 3:20 |
| 9. | "Strip" (featuring Kevin McCall) | Brown; McCall; Streeter | Tha Bizness | 2:47 |
| 10. | "Stuck on Stupid" | Brown; Dewain Whitmore Jr. | Kennedy; D. Jones^{[a]} | 3:59 |
| 11. | "4 Years Old" | Brown | Polow da Don; Hittz | 3:49 |
| 12. | "Party Hard / Cadillac (Interlude)" (featuring Sevyn) | Brown; Streeter | Boi-1da; Kennedy; Brown | 5:14 |
| 13. | "Don't Wake Me Up" | Brown; Ryan Buendia; Priscilla Hamilton; Nicholas Marsh; Michael McHenry; Alain Whyte | Alle Benassi; Benny Benassi; Free School; William Orbit; Kennedy^{[a]} | 3:42 |
| 14. | "Trumpet Lights" (featuring Sabrina Antoinette) | Brown | Polow da Don; Jerome Harmon^{[a]} | 3:47 |

Deluxe edition additional tracks
| No. | Title | Writer(s) | Producer(s) | Length |
|---|---|---|---|---|
| 15. | "Tell Somebody" | Brown | Polow da Don; Harmon^{[a]} | 4:04 |
| 16. | "Free Run" | Dominique Cohill; Michael Daley; Steve Russell | The Underdogs | 4:01 |
| 17. | "Remember My Name" (featuring Sevyn) | Brown; Streeter; McCall | Brown; Free School; Jonas Jeberg^{[a]} | 3:39 |
| 18. | "Wait for You" | Brown; Bellinger | H-Money; Brown^{[a]} | 3:38 |
| 19. | "Touch Me" (featuring Sevyn) | Brown; Streeter | R.A.P. 1220 | 3:37 |

UK and Ireland deluxe edition (bonus tracks)
| No. | Title | Writer(s) | Producer(s) | Length |
|---|---|---|---|---|
| 20. | "Key 2 Your Heart" | Brown; McCall | Dallas Austin | 3:23 |
| 21. | "Do It Again" | Brown; Streeter | The Runners; Catalyst | 3:34 |

Japanese deluxe edition (bonus track)
| No. | Title | Writer(s) | Producer(s) | Length |
|---|---|---|---|---|
| 20. | "Your World" | Brown | The Messengers | 3:50 |

Rarities & B-Sides package, and streaming version (bonus tracks)
| No. | Title | Writer(s) | Producer(s) | Length |
|---|---|---|---|---|
| 20. | "Oh Yeah" (featuring Snoop Dogg and 2 Chainz) | Brown; Omololu Akinlolu; Calvin Cordozar Broadus Jr.; Tauheed K. Epps | Drumma Boy | 4:41 |
| 21. | "Calypso" | Brown | Polow da Don | 4:49 |
| 22. | "Get Down" (featuring B.o.B) | Brown; Faheem Rasheed Najm; Bobby Ray Simmons Jr. | Young Fyre | 3:38 |
| Total length: | | | | 87:04 |

Notes

- ^{^[a]} signifies a co-producer
- The UK and Ireland deluxe edition is a double disc album.
- "Turn Up the Music" contains background vocals by Michael Jimenez
- "Don't Judge Me", "Biggest Fan", "Stuck on Stupid", "Do It Again" and "Calypso" contain background vocals by Sevyn Streeter
- "2012" contains background vocals by Adonis, Georgia Reign, and Kevin McCall
- "Party Hard / Cadillac (Interlude)" contains background vocals by Dewain Whitmore Jr.
- "Wait for You" contains background vocals by Courtney Harrell
- "Key 2 Your Heart" contains background vocals by Kevin McCall
- "Get Down" contains background vocals by T-Pain

Sample credits

- "Party Hard / Cadillac (Interlude)" contains a portion of "Computer Love", written by Shirley Murdock, Larry Troutman and Roger Troutman.

== Personnel ==
Credits for Fortune adapted from liner notes.

- Adonis – producer, background vocals
- Alle Benassi – producer
- Benny Benassi – producer
- Boi-1da – producer
- Delbert Bowers – assistant
- Chris Brown – creative director, executive producer, producer
- Kweli Calderon – grooming
- Dan Cohen – engineer
- Tom Coyne – mastering
- Greg Curtis – keyboards
- Danja – producer
- Alex Delicata – electric guitar, guitar arrangements
- Alex Dilliplane – assistant
- Iain Findlay – assistant
- Andre Frappier – guitar
- Free School – producer
- Fuego – producer
- Chris Galland – assistant
- Doug Geikie – assistant
- Şerban Ghenea – mixing
- Steven Gomillion – photography
- John Hanes – mixing engineer
- Jerome "J Roc" Harmon – producer
- Trehy Harris – assistant
- Andrew Hey – engineer
- Tommy Hitz – producer
- Is – guitar
- Dayvi Jae – producer
- Jaycen Joshua – mixing
- Michael "Mike J" Jiminez – background vocals
- Dante Jones – producer
- Brian Kennedy – producer
- Dennis Leupold – photography
- Lonnie-Smoek-Stinson – grooming
- Manny Marroquin – mixing
- Kevin McCall – background vocals, producer
- The Messengers – producer
- The Monarch – producer
- William Orbit – producer
- Jason "JP" Perry – producer
- Polow da Don – producer
- Georgia Reign – background vocals
- The Runners – producer
- Jacqueln S. – photography model
- Sajata S. – photography model
- Harmony "H Money" Samuels – producer
- Phil Seaford – assistant engineer
- Bradford Smith – assistant
- Brian Springer – engineer
- Amber Streeter – background vocals
- Sviatlana – photography model
- Team Breezy – art direction, creative director, design, executive producer, management, stylist
- Tha Bizness – producer
- David Thomas – stylist
- The Underdogs – producer
- Jeff "Supa Jeff" Villanueva – pro-tools
- Courtney Walter – art direction, creative director, design
- Pop & Oak – producer team
- Dewaine Whitmore, Jr. – background vocals
- Siraaj Amnesia James – arranger

== Charts ==
=== Weekly charts ===
Weekly chart performance for Fortune
| Chart (2012) | Peak position |
|---|---|
| Australian Albums (ARIA) | 2 |
| Australian Urban Albums (ARIA) | 1 |
| Austrian Albums (Ö3 Austria) | 28 |
| Belgian Albums (Ultratop Flanders) | 21 |
| Belgian Albums (Ultratop Wallonia) | 24 |
| Canadian Albums (Billboard) | 6 |
| Czech Albums (ČNS IFPI) | 27 |
| Danish Albums (Hitlisten) | 13 |
| Dutch Albums (Album Top 100) | 1 |
| French Albums (SNEP) | 8 |
| German Albums (Offizielle Top 100) | 13 |
| Irish Albums (IRMA) | 4 |
| Japanese Albums (Oricon) | 9 |
| New Zealand Albums (RMNZ) | 1 |
| Norwegian Albums (VG-lista) | 28 |
| Scottish Albums (Official Charts) | 2 |
| South Korean Albums (Circle) | 24 |
| Spanish Albums (Promusicae) | 21 |
| Swedish Albums (Sverigetopplistan) | 54 |
| Swiss Albums (Schweizer Hitparade) | 10 |
| UK Albums (Official Charts) | 1 |
| UK R&B Albums (Official Charts) | 1 |
| US Billboard 200 | 1 |
| US Top R&B/Hip-Hop Albums (Billboard) | 1 |

=== Year-end charts ===
2012 year-end chart performance for Fortune
| Chart (2012) | Position |
|---|---|
| Australian Urban Albums (ARIA) | 13 |
| UK Albums (OCC) | 122 |
| US Billboard 200 | 77 |
| US Top R&B/Hip-Hop Albums (Billboard) | 14 |

2013 year-end chart performance for Fortune
| Chart (2013) | Position |
|---|---|
| US Top R&B/Hip-Hop Albums (Billboard) | 53 |

== Certifications ==
Certifications for Fortune
| Region | Certification | Certified units/sales |
|---|---|---|
| Australia (ARIA) | Gold | 35,000^{‡} |
| New Zealand (RMNZ) | Platinum | 15,000^{‡} |
| South Africa (RISA) | Platinum | 50,000^{‡} |
| Sweden (GLF) | Gold | 20,000^{‡} |
| United Kingdom (BPI) | Gold | 100,000^{^} |
| United States (RIAA) | Platinum | 1,000,000^{‡} |
^{^} Shipments figures based on certification alone.^{‡} Sales+streaming figures based on certification alone.

== See also ==
- List of Billboard 200 number-one albums of 2012
- List of Billboard number-one R&B albums of 2012
- List of number-one albums from the 2010s (New Zealand)
- List of UK Albums Chart number ones of the 2010s
- List of UK R&B Albums Chart number ones of 2012
