= Sweet Love (Chris Brown song) =

Single by Chris Brown

from the album Fortune
- Released: April 10, 2012
- Genre: Electro-R&B
- Length: 3:19
- Label: RCA
- Songwriters: Chris Brown; Cory Marks; Greg Curtis; Jamal "Polow da Don" Jones; Jason "JP" Perry; Tommy Doyle Jr.
- Producers: Jason "JP" Perry; Polow da Don

Chris Brown singles chronology
"Take It to the Head" (2012)	"Sweet Love" (2012)	"Till I Die" (2012)

Music video
- "Sweet Love" on YouTube

"Sweet Love" is a song by American singer Chris Brown, taken from his fifth studio album, Fortune (2012). It was written by Brown, Cory Marks, Greg Curtis, Jamal "Polow da Don" Jones, Jason "JP" Perry and Tommy Doyle Jr., while the production was handled by Polow da Don and Perry. The song was sent to urban contemporary radio in the United States on April 10, 2012, as the second single from the album. "Sweet Love" is a slow jam R&B ballad which incorporates elements of electronic music. The lyrics of the song revolve around Brown asking his lover to take off her clothes so that they can have sex.

"Sweet Love" garnered positive reviews from music critics, who complimented the song's sexual lyrics. In the United States, it peaked at number 25 on the Hot R&B/Hip-Hop Songs chart, and number 89 on the Billboard Hot 100 chart. The accompanying music video was co-directed by Godfrey Taberez and Brown, and filmed at Universal Studios in Los Angeles, California. It displays intimate scenes of Brown and his lover partaking in sexual activity, women levitating out of their beds, and Brown dancing. Critics were complimentary of the video's sexual themes and presentation.

== Background and release ==
"Sweet Love" was written by Chris Brown, Cory Marks, Greg Curtis, Jamal "Polow da Don" Jones, Jason "JP" Perry and Tommy Doyle Jr., while the production was handled by Polow da Don and Perry. The audio mixing was completed by Jaycen Joshua, with assistance by Trehy Harris. Curtis played keyboards on the song. On March 28, 2012, Brown announced via his official Twitter account that he would be releasing "Sweet Love" and "Till I Die" as the next two singles from Fortune, after the lead single "Turn Up the Music". Later that same day, he posted a link to a stream of "Sweet Love". The artwork for the single was shot in black-and-white, and debuted online on March 30, 2012. It displays Brown sitting on the floor, staring up at the legs of one of the three women. Rap-Up magazine described the artwork as "grown and sexy". "Sweet Love" was officially sent to urban contemporary playlists in the United States on April 10, 2012. It was released as a one-track digital download in Oceania and most European countries on April 13, 2012. However, in the US, "Sweet Love" was released on April 17, 2012. A remix of the song by American R&B singer R. Kelly, was posted online on July 26, 2012.

== Composition and lyrics ==
"Sweet Love" is a slow jam R&B ballad that displays elements of electronic music; it lasts for a duration of three minutes and 19 seconds long. The instrumentation is provided by a keyboard, synthesizers, percussion and a drum machine. According to Nadeska Alexis of MTV's Rapfix, Brown sings in a falsetto tone, which she found to be reminiscent of Michael Jackson. Amy Sciarretto of PopCrush described the ballad as "very Michael Jackson and neo-Bieber". JusMusic of Singersroom noted that "Sweet Love" is inspired by Silk's "Freak Me" (1993). Cameron Adams of the Herald Sun musically compared the song to Prince. The theme of "Sweet Love" revolves around sex. It contains lyrics about Brown asking his lover to take off her clothes so that they can have sex. During the chorus, he harmonizes: "Oooh baby let's get naked / Just so we can make sweet love / All these sensations got me going crazy for you / Inside on top of you / Grinding inside and out of you / Baby I know what to do / Let's just take our clothes off".

== Music video ==
The accompanying music video for "Sweet Love" was co-directed by Godfrey Taberez and Brown, and filmed on the back lot of Universal Studios in Los Angeles, California. The video was shot from 6:00 am to 6:00 pm. Twenty models were hired for the shooting of the scenes where they are levitating from their beds. On April 26, 2012, several photos from the shoot were posted online, showing women levitating out of their beds in the streets as Brown walked by them. The video premiered on Vevo on May 25, 2012. A behind the scenes video was released on May 26, 2012, a day after the video premiered online.

As the song begins, Brown watches a woman, who appears as a hologram, lying in a bed. This scene is intercut with scenes of Brown singing in front of a flowing backdrop. He then approaches the woman, and together they appear under white bedsheets. Brown is then seen walking down a street, while women are shown levitating out of their beds as he passes by them. He then enters a limo and starts caressing various ghostlike female figures. Brown then returns to the bedroom where he "strips shirtless and makes passionate love" to the woman "as they are showered in water". He later enters a dance studio, where he performs a dance routine with other shirtless male dancers, while several women watch them from across the room. Towards the end of the video, more scenes are shown of Brown and the woman in the bedroom.

Melinda Newman of HitFix called the video "undeniably steamy". Emily Hewett of the Metro wrote that the video featured "flawless dance moves" from Brown. Robbie Daw of Idolator noted that Brown "makes things real sexy" in the video, but was unsure if "we should be turned on or utterly creeped out". Jessica Sager of PopCrush noted that Brown "channels his R&B side" and added that he is "a bit of a clumsy romantic". Jessica Sinclair of the Long Island Press described the video as a "juicy new entertainment" for Brown's fans in anticipation of his new album. Jazmine Gray of Vibe magazine described the video as "hot, heavy and really wet". Upon its release, the video went viral and received over one million views in its first day of release.

== Critical reception ==
"Sweet Love" garnered positive reviews from music critics. Nadeska Alexis of MTV's Rapfix wrote that Brown "keeps the sexiness at an all time high" with lyrics that "could easily win any girl over". Contessa Gayles of AOL's The Boombox described "Sweet Love" as "baby making music", while Mark Edward Nero of About.com labeled it as "a straight-up sex jam". Amy Sciarretto of PopCrush called the song a sexy R&B jam that could "easily woo Rihanna back". David Shapiro of Fuse TV viewed "Sweet Love" as "auditory pornography" and commented that the lyrics had him "blushing". Joseph Patterson of MTV UK labeled it one of Brown's classic songs "for the lovers". Maura Johnston of Rolling Stone awarded "Sweet Love" three stars out of five, and noted that Brown appears to be transitioning from singing songs about partying in clubs to singing about sex. Johnston continued writing that the music video for the song "would be almost pornographically unnecessary". Robbie Daw of Idolator wrote that the ballad ticks all the boxes for its "synthy melody, decent beat" and Brown's "vocal harmonies", but felt that it is not "the most innovative offering" from Brown. Melinda Newman of HitFix wrote that in "Sweet Love", it appears "there are two songs at war here as the synth drum beat totally overwhelms and clashes with the ballad". She criticized the song for being "memorable for all the wrong reasons".

== Chart performance ==
In the United States, "Sweet Love" debuted at number 90 on the Hot R&B/Hip-Hop Songs chart in the issue dated April 14, 2012. After spending 12 weeks ascending the chart, the song peaked at number 25 in the issue dated July 7, 2012. The song remained on the chart for a total of 15 weeks. On the Billboard Hot 100, "Sweet Love" debuted and peaked at number 89 in the issue dated May 5, 2012.

== Track listing ==
- Digital download
1. "Sweet Love" – 3:19

== Credits and personnel ==
Credits adapted from the liner notes for Fortune

- Chris Brown – lead vocals, songwriter
- Dan Cohen – additional recorder
- Greg Curtis – songwriter, keyboards
- Tommy Doyle Jr. – songwriter
- Trehy Harris – assistant mixer
- Jamal "Polow da Don" Jones – songwriter, producer
- Jaycen Joshua – mixer
- Cory Marks – songwriter
- Jason "JP" Perry – songwriter, producer
- Bradford Smith – assistant recorder
- Brian Springer – recorder

== Charts ==
=== Weekly charts ===
Weekly chart performance for "Sweet Love"
Chart (2012)	Peak position
US Billboard Hot 100	89
US Hot R&B/Hip-Hop Songs (Billboard)	25

=== Year-end charts ===
2012 year-end chart performance for "Sweet Love"
Chart (2012)	Position
US Hot R&B/Hip-Hop Songs	80

== Certifications ==
Certifications for "Sweet Love"
Region	Certification	Certified units/sales
United States (RIAA)	Gold	500,000^{‡}
^{‡} Sales+streaming figures based on certification alone.

== Release history ==
Country	Date	Format	Label
United States	April 10, 2012	Urban contemporary radio	RCA Records
Australia	April 13, 2012	Digital download	RCA Records
Austria	April 13, 2012	Digital download	RCA Records
Belgium	April 13, 2012	Digital download	RCA Records
Canada	April 13, 2012	Digital download	RCA Records
Denmark	April 13, 2012	Digital download	RCA Records
Finland	April 13, 2012	Digital download	RCA Records
France	April 13, 2012	Digital download	RCA Records
Italy	April 13, 2012	Digital download	RCA Records
Netherlands	April 13, 2012	Digital download	RCA Records
New Zealand	April 13, 2012	Digital download	RCA Records
Norway	April 13, 2012	Digital download	RCA Records
Portugal	April 13, 2012	Digital download	RCA Records
Spain	April 13, 2012	Digital download	RCA Records
Sweden	April 13, 2012	Digital download	RCA Records
Switzerland	April 13, 2012	Digital download	RCA Records
United States	April 16, 2012	Urban mainstream radio	RCA Records
United States	April 17, 2012	Digital download	RCA Records
