= Don't Wake Me Up (Chris Brown song) =

2012 single by Chris Brown

Single by Chris Brown

from the album Fortune
- Released: May 18, 2012
- Recorded: 2011
- Genre: Dance-pop; EDM
- Length: 3:42
- Label: RCA
- Songwriters: Alain Whyte; Alessandro Benassi; Brian Kennedy; Chris Brown; Jean-Baptiste; Marco Benassi; Michael McHenry; Priscilla Hamilton; Nick Marsh; Ryan Buendia; William Orbit
- Producers: Benny Benassi; Alle Benassi; Free School; William Orbit; Brian "BK" Kennedy

Chris Brown singles chronology
"Put It Down" (2012)	"Don't Wake Me Up" (2012)	"Don't Judge Me" (2012)

Music video
- "Don't Wake Me Up" on YouTube

"Don't Wake Me Up" is a song by American singer Chris Brown, taken from his fifth studio album, Fortune (2012). It was written by Brown, Muni Long (then known as Priscilla Renea), Alain Whyte, Alessandro Benassi, Brian Kennedy, Jean-Baptiste, Marco Benassi, Michael McHenry, Nick Marsh, Ryan Buendia. and William Orbit. The song was written in its entirety in one night to an instrumental created by Marsh. From there, he provided additional production along with Orbit, Whyte, and members of Free School. Further production was done by Benny and Alle Benassi in the song's final stages. It was released digitally on May 18, 2012 by RCA Records, as the fourth single from the album. "Don't Wake Me Up" is an EDM song that features heavy bass and a repetitive chorus. The lyrics of the song describe a lost loved one who exists only in a dream. The song received generally positive reception from music critics.

"Don't Wake Me Up" peaked at number ten on the Billboard Hot 100. It further peaked within the top ten of the charts in Australia, Austria, Hungary, Japan, New Zealand, Norway, the Republic of Ireland, and the United Kingdom, and the top 20 of the charts in Belgium, Denmark, France, Germany, Sweden, and Switzerland. The accompanying music video was directed by Colin Tilley and depicts Brown in three different dreams, all of which involve a mysterious woman, played by model Araya Nicks. Brown promoted the song with live performances on televised shows, including Today and the 2012 BET Awards.

== Background and release ==
"Don't Wake Me Up" was always intended for Brown, but was still pitched to other artists including American pop singer Madonna, who would have released the song on her twelfth studio album MDNA (2012); however, she could not record the song because of her tight schedule, and the song went to Brown. After an unofficial version of "Don't Wake Me Up" was leaked online in January 2012, websites reported that the song was produced by David Guetta. However, Guetta said on his Facebook and Twitter accounts, "I'm credited for 'Don't Wake Me Up' ... but I did not produce this record. Best to CB!".

On May 12, 2012, Brown announced on his Twitter account that he would release "Don't Wake Me Up" as the next single from his fifth studio album Fortune. It was made available for download via iTunes Stores worldwide on May 18, 2012. The Free School/William Orbit remix of the song was released in some European countries on May 22, 2012. In the United States, "Don't Wake Me Up" was sent to contemporary hit radio and rhythmic contemporary radio playlists on June 12, 2012. On June 22, 2012, it was released as a CD single in Germany and as a Digital EP in the United Kingdom. The EP contains the album version, remix and Brown's previous singles "Till I Die" and "Sweet Love". It is the 10th track on Now That's What I Call Music! 44.

== Composition and lyrics ==
"Don't Wake Me Up" is an EDM song that features heavy bass; it lasts for 3 minutes and 42 seconds. The instrumentation is provided by an acoustic guitar and synthesizers. Brown uses auto-tune on the hook and breakdown. "Don't Wake Me Up" is written in the key of B♭ major and is set in common time with a tempo of 128 beats per minute. Brown's vocal range spans from the note of G_{4} to the note of C_{6}. The song contains lyrics about a lost loved one who exists only in a dream, as stated by Brittany R. Villalva of The Christian Post. "Don't Wake Me Up" begins with a spoken introduction by an unidentified woman saying, "Dearly Beloved, if this love only exists in my dreams, don't wake me up". Robbie Daw of Idolator compared her voice to that of Rihanna. The song's chorus consists of the hook "Don't wake me up". Lewis Corner of Digital Spy wrote that the chorus "flourishes into a pulse-racing mix of thundering beats and squiggly electronic swizzles". HitFix's Melinda Newman noted that the song "resembles the sweet bounciness of 'Forever'".

== Music video ==
A screenshot of the music video, featuring Brown and the woman lying in bed with electrodes attached to their heads.

=== Background ===
The accompanying music video for "Don't Wake Me Up" was directed by Colin Tilley and filmed in a desert on May 14, 2012. Several images from the shoot, showing Brown posing shirtless against a vintage car, and images of Brown posing with model Araya Nicks, who plays his love interest in the video, were posted on the Internet the following day. The video premiered online on June 11, 2012. Later that day, Brown made a guest appearance on 106 & Park and discussed the video's concept:

With this video, we wanted to go completely into the dream world. A lot of my videos from 'Turn Up the Music' and other videos I'm doing now are in a dream state of believing what you want to believe. So that's what Fortune kinda encompasses. So it's basically dreaming and accomplishing your dreams. This video is me dreaming and being taken into this whole kind of maze. I keep waking up within a dream within a dream, almost on some Inception type ... but I don't want to bite that.

=== Synopsis ===
The video begins with Brown standing alone in a desert in front of a sunset backdrop. It then cuts to Brown waking up in a bedroom as he notices a mysterious woman (played by Araya Nicks) walking through the first of three doors behind him. Each door is labeled with hieroglyphics in gold. During the first chorus, Brown follows the woman through the door and enters a garden maze. This scene is intercut with scenes of Brown singing in the desert. He then returns to bed as the woman walks through the second door. Brown follows her again and appears in a city in the sky. This scene is also intercut with scenes of him in the desert. During the second chorus, Brown is hit by a tidal wave which sends him back to bed. He then enters the third door and appears driving a vintage car in the desert. Brown drives after the woman until he hits a sign that reads "Road Closed", which causes him to drive off a cliff. The video then cuts to Brown and the woman lying in bed with electrodes attached to their heads.

=== Reception ===
Nicole Sia of Idolator called the clip Brown's "Video of the Year" and complimented its "stunning dream imagery". A writer for The Edge called it "another visually tantalising music video" from Brown, while Rap-Up described it as surreal. Trent Fitzgerald of PopCrush described the video as "good visual fun" and wrote that it reminded him of the television series Day Break. He compared the ending to the 1999 film The Matrix. The video was nominated for World's Best Video at the 2012 World Music Awards.

== Live performances ==
On June 8, 2012, Brown performed "Don't Wake Me Up" on Today as part of its Summer Concert Series, for which he wore a New York Yankees cap, a multicolored Snow Beach Polo jacket, black jeans and white sneakers. The set list also included "Turn Up the Music", "Yeah 3x" and "Forever". At the 2012 BET Awards ceremony on July 1, 2012, Brown performed "Don't Wake Me Up" and "Turn Up the Music", for which he appeared shirtless with half his body painted gray. Brown performed acrobatic moves with six backup dancers under triangle-shaped beams as green and red flashing lights appeared throughout the stage. Georgette Cline of The Boombox wrote that Brown "put on an energetic show" and described his dance routines during the performance as "eye-catching".

== Critical reception ==
The song received generally positive reception from music critics. Lewis Corner of Digital Spy called it "this summer's biggest anthem", awarding the song five stars out of five and writing that Brown delivers it "with effortless swagger". JusMusic of Singersroom described "Don't Wake Me Up" as a "fun and bubbly track", while a writer for Rap-Up labeled it as an "electrifying Top 40 record". Robbie Daw of Idolator complimented the song's production as a "strobe light thumper" and wrote that if listeners enjoy Brown's auto-tuned tracks, "then you won't be disappointed". Time's Melissa Locker viewed "Don't Wake Me Up" and "Turn Up the Music" as the only potential hits from Fortune.

Nick Levine of BBC Music called the song "a smash". AOL Radio's Phil Kukawinski noted that "Don't Wake Me Up" has "a nice juxtaposition of calm and energetic" and that it "seems to be one of those songs that merges the two sounds in a perfect way". James Reed of The Boston Globe called the song "a thumping club cut that's irresistible". Trent Fitzgerald of PopCrush described "Don't Wake Me Up" as a "fist-pumping club jam" but felt that it is "not as catchy as 'Beautiful People'". In a review of Fortune, Barry Walters of Spin magazine wrote that "Don't Wake Me Up", along with "Sweet Love" and "Till I Die", contain "thin melodies and stock shock lyrics" that make Brown's previous singles sound better. "Don't Wake Me Up" was nominated for World's Best Song at the 2013 World Music Awards.

== Chart performance ==
In New Zealand, "Don't Wake Me Up" debuted at number 34 on May 28, 2012, and peaked at number two in its eighth week on the chart. It was certified platinum by RIANZ, denoting sales of 15,000 copies. On June 4, 2012, the song entered the Australian ARIA Singles Chart at number five, becoming the highest new entry that week and Brown's tenth top-ten single in the country. "Don't Wake Me Up" peaked at number two in its fifth week on the chart, and number one in its eighth week on the ARIA Urban Singles Chart. The song was certified triple platinum by ARIA, denoting sales of 210,000 copies. "Don't Wake Me Up" reached the top ten in Hungary, Ireland, Japan and Norway, and the top twenty in Denmark, France, Germany, Sweden, Switzerland and both regions of Belgium.

In the United States, the song debuted on the Billboard Hot 100 at number 89 in the issue dated June 9, 2012. "Don't Wake Me Up" entered the top ten in the issue dated November 10, 2012 at number 10, where it peaked. It became Brown's twelfth top-ten single on the chart, and his second top-ten single from Fortune, following "Turn Up the Music". As of August 2012, the single has sold a million digital copies in the United States.

In the United Kingdom, "Don't Wake Me Up" debuted at number three on the UK Singles Chart on July 1, 2012 – for the week ending date July 7, 2012 – with sales of 89,223 copies. The following week, the song peaked at number two with sales of 70,702 copies, beaten to the top by "Payphone" by Maroon 5 featuring Wiz Khalifa in its second non-consecutive week at the throne of the UK Singles Chart. According to the Official Charts Company, as of January 2013, "Don't Wake Me Up" has sold 416,684 copies in Britain. In Austria, "Don't Wake Me Up" reached number one on August 17, 2012, where it remained for one week, becoming Brown's first number-one single in that country.

== Formats and track listing ==
- Digital download
1. "Don't Wake Me Up" – 3:42
- Digital remix
1. "Don't Wake Me Up" (Free School/William Orbit Mix) – 4:44
- Germany CD / Brazil, Canada, and Europe digital download
1. "Don't Wake Me Up" – 3:42
2. "Don't Wake Me Up" (Free School/William Orbit Mix) – 4:44
- UK Digital EP
1. "Don't Wake Me Up" – 3:42
2. "Don't Wake Me Up" (Free School/William Orbit Mix) – 4:44
3. "Till I Die" (featuring Big Sean and Wiz Khalifa) – 3:57
4. "Sweet Love" – 3:19
- Brazil Digital Remix EP
1. "Don't Wake Me Up" – 3:42
2. "Don't Wake Me Up" (dBerrie Remix) – 7:17
3. "Don't Wake Me Up" (Panic City Remix Radio Edit) – 4:35
4. "Don't Wake Me Up" (Panic City Remix Radio Extended) – 5:28
5. "Don't Wake Me Up" (Music Video) – 3:45
- Germany Digital Remix EP 1
1. "Don't Wake Me Up" – 3:42
2. "Don't Wake Me Up" (Free School/William Orbit Mix) – 4:44
3. "Don't Wake Me Up" (Panic City Remix Radio Edit) – 4:35
4. "Don't Wake Me Up" (dBerrie Remix) – 7:17
5. "Don't Wake Me Up" (Music Video) – 3:45
- Germany Digital Remix EP 2
1. "Don't Wake Me Up" – 3:42
2. "Don't Wake Me Up" (Free School/William Orbit Mix) – 4:44
3. "Don't Wake Me Up" (DJ White Shadow Remix) – 3:39
4. "Don't Wake Me Up" (TheFatRat Remix) – 5:38
5. "Don't Wake Me Up" (Clinton Sparks Remix) – 4:00
- US Digital Remix EP
1. "Don't Wake Me Up" (dBerrie Remix) – 7:17
2. "Don't Wake Me Up" (TheFatRat Remix) – 5:38
3. "Don't Wake Me Up" (Panic City Remix Radio Edit) – 4:35
4. "Don't Wake Me Up" (Clinton Sparks Remix) – 4:00
5. "Don't Wake Me Up" (DJ White Shadow Remix) – 3:39
- Digital Remixes – Brazil, Canada, and Europe
1. "Don't Wake Me Up" – 3:42
2. "Don't Wake Me Up" (Free School/William Orbit Mix) – 4:44
3. "Don't Wake Me Up" (dBerrie Remix) – 7:17
4. "Don't Wake Me Up" (Panic City Remix Radio Edit) – 4:35
5. "Don't Wake Me Up" (DJ White Shadow Remix) – 3:39
6. "Don't Wake Me Up" (TheFatRat Remix) – 5:38
7. "Don't Wake Me Up" (Clinton Sparks Remix) – 4:00

== Credits and personnel ==
Credits adapted from the liner notes for Fortune

- Jean-Baptiste – songwriter
- Alessandro "Alle" Benassi – songwriter, producer, instruments
- Marco "Benny" Benassi – songwriter, producer, instruments
- Chris Brown – lead vocals, songwriter
- Ryan Buendia – songwriter
- Iain Findley – assistant recorder
- Serban Ghenea – mixer
- Priscilla "Priscilla Renea" Hamilton – songwriter
- John Hanes – mix engineer
- Brian "BK" Kennedy – songwriter, co-producer
- Nick Marsh – songwriter, producer, instruments
- Michael McHenry – songwriter
- William Orbit – songwriter, producer
- Phil Seaford – assistant mix engineer
- Brian Springer – recorder
- Alain Whyte – songwriter

== Charts ==
=== Weekly charts ===
Weekly chart performance for "Don't Wake Me Up"
Chart (2012–2013)	Peak position
Australia (ARIA)	2
Austria (Ö3 Austria Top 40)	1
Belgium (Ultratop 50 Flanders)	12
Belgium (Ultratop 50 Wallonia)	17
Brazil (Billboard Brasil Hot 100)	55
Brazil Hot Pop Songs	16
Canada Hot 100 (Billboard)	22
Czech Republic (IFPI)	34
Denmark (Tracklisten)	16
France (SNEP)	11
Germany (GfK)	11
Honduras (Honduras Top 50)	46
Hungary (Rádiós Top 40)	8
Ireland (IRMA)	4
Italy (FIMI)	66
Japan (Japan Hot 100)	9
Luxembourg (Billboard)	6
Netherlands (Dutch Top 40)	34
Netherlands (Single Top 100)	37
New Zealand (Recorded Music NZ)	2
Norway (VG-lista)	8
Scottish Singles Sales (Official Charts)	1
Slovakia (IFPI)	27
Spain (Promusicae)	31
Sweden (Sverigetopplistan)	20
Switzerland (Schweizer Hitparade)	12
UK Singles (Official Charts)	2
US Billboard Hot 100	10
US Adult Pop Airplay (Billboard)	30
US Dance Airplay (Billboard)	5
US Dance Club Songs (Billboard)	12
US Pop Airplay (Billboard)	6
US Rhythmic Airplay (Billboard)	2

=== Year-end charts ===
2012 year-end chart performance for "Don't Wake Me Up"
Chart (2012)	Position
Australia (ARIA)	46
Austria (Ö3 Austria Top 40)	38
Belgium (Ultratop 50 Flanders)	49
Belgium (Ultratop 40 Wallonia)	89
France (SNEP)	65
Germany (Media Control AG)	62
Hungary (Rádiós Top 40)	81
New Zealand (Recorded Music NZ)	38
Sweden (Sverigetopplistan)	69
Switzerland (Schweizer Hitparade)	64
UK Singles (Official Charts Company)	37
US Billboard Hot 100	56
US Mainstream Top 40 (Billboard)	48
US Rhythmic (Billboard)	29

2013 year-end chart performance for "Don't Wake Me Up"
Chart (2013)	Position
Brazil (Crowley)	77

== Certifications ==
Certifications for "Don't Wake Me Up"
Region	Certification	Certified units/sales
Australia (ARIA)	4× Platinum	280,000^{^}
Austria (IFPI Austria)	Gold	15,000^{*}
Belgium (BRMA)	Gold	15,000^{*}
Denmark (IFPI Danmark)	Gold	15,000^{^}
Germany (BVMI)	Gold	150,000^{^}
Japan (RIAJ)	Gold	100,000^{*}
Mexico (AMPROFON)	Gold	30,000^{*}
New Zealand (RMNZ)	Platinum	15,000^{*}
Sweden (GLF)	Platinum	40,000^{‡}
United Kingdom (BPI)	Platinum	600,000^{‡}
United States (RIAA)	3× Platinum	3,000,000^{‡}
Streaming
Denmark (IFPI Danmark)	Platinum	1,800,000^{†}
^{*} Sales figures based on certification alone.^{^} Shipments figures based on certification alone.^{‡} Sales+streaming figures based on certification alone.^{†} Streaming-only figures based on certification alone.

== Radio and release history ==
Country	Date	Format	Label
Australia	May 18, 2012	Digital download	RCA Records
United States	May 22, 2012	Digital download	RCA Records
Europe	May 22, 2012	Digital remix	RCA Records
Brazil	June 1, 2012	Digital download	RCA Records
Canada	June 1, 2012	Digital download	RCA Records
Europe	June 1, 2012	Digital download	RCA Records
United States	June 12, 2012	Mainstream; rhythmic radio	RCA Records
Germany	June 22, 2012	CD single	RCA Records
United Kingdom	June 22, 2012	Digital EP	RCA Records
Brazil	July 9, 2012	Digital Remix EP	RCA Records
Brazil	July 20, 2012	Digital Remixes	RCA Records
Canada	July 20, 2012	Digital Remixes	RCA Records
Europe	July 20, 2012	Digital Remixes	RCA Records
Germany	July 27, 2012	Two-sided digital remix EP	RCA Records
United States	August 13, 2012	Digital Remix EP	RCA Records
