= 2012 (Chris Brown song) =

Song performed by Chris Brown

Song by Chris Brown

from the album Fortune
- Released: June 29, 2012
- Studio: The Record Plant (Los Angeles, California)
- Genre: R&B
- Length: 4:08
- Label: RCA
- Songwriters: Chris Brown; Kevin McCall
- Producers: Adonis; McCall

Audio video
- "2012" on YouTube

"2012" is a song by American singer Chris Brown, taken from his fifth studio album Fortune (2012). Released on June 29, 2012, the song was written by Brown and Kevin McCall, while its production was handled by Adonis Shropshire and McCall. Musically, "2012" is an R&B slow jam, with lyrics about passionate love-making located in the 2012 phenomenon, with the song being named after it. The track's musicality was praised by music critics, while its lyrical content received a mixed response. Despite not being released as a single, the song was included on various setlists of Brown's tours, also entering at number 25 on the US Hot R&B Songs (Billboard) in 2013.

== Development and composition ==
"2012" was written by Brown and frequent collaborator Kevin McCall, while its production was handled by Adonis Shropshire and McCall. Adonis, Georgia Reign, and McCall perform some of the background vocals. Musically, "2012" is an R&B slow jam, with lyrics featuring sexual content located in the 2012 phenomenon. According to AllMusic, its lyrics explore "some kind of Mayan apocalypse scenario where Brown and his lover are called upon to reverse the planet's fate". The track's intro features a female voice saying "Faire l'amour lendemain" (French for 'Make love day after').

== Critical reception ==
"2012" was praised by music critics for Brown's vocal performance and its production, while its lyrical content received a mixed response. AllMusic called it an "atmospheric, impeccably-produced ballad", with "something shameless" in its lyrics. HipHopDX, while reviewing Fortune, noted "2012" as one of the album's most sexual tracks. The Guardian called the song "a slow jam outrageous enough". Los Angeles Times commended Brown's singing on "2012". Reviewing the album, Metro noted the track as a "brief flash of soulful potential".

== Live performances ==
"2012" was included by Brown on various setlists of his tours, including the Carpe Diem Tour, Between the Sheets Tour, One Hell of a Nite Tour and Indigoat Tour.

== Charts ==
Chart performance for "2012"
Chart (2013)	Peak position
US Hot R&B Songs (Billboard)	25

== Certifications ==
Certifications for "2012"
Region	Certification	Certified units/sales
United States (RIAA)	Gold	500,000^{‡}
^{‡} Sales+streaming figures based on certification alone.
