= Chris Sorbello =

Australian singer, songwriter and dancer

- Born: Chris Sorbello; Brisbane, Australia
- Origin: Sydney
- Genres: Electropop, dance, pop
- Occupations: Singer-songwriter, dancer
- Years active: 2009–present
- Labels: Ministry of Sound (2009–present)
- Website: http://www.chrissorbello.com.au/

Chris Sorbello is an Australian singer, songwriter and dancer. She is currently signed to the Ministry of Sound label in Australia and released her debut single, "So Lonely" on 9 April 2010 to Top 40 success. Sorbello's second single, "Dangerzone", was released in October of the same year alongside its music video.

== Early life ==
Chris Sorbello was born and raised in Brisbane. Sorbello began to have a passion for music when she was only five years of age, when she viewed an episode of Young Talent Time. Sorbello joined the Johnny Young Talent School shortly thereafter. She regularly performed at Italian festivals and outdoor events. Sorbello was nearly killed in a car accident when she was 16, spending 10 days in a coma. In 2003, Chris relocated to Sydney, where she studied contemporary voice at the Australian Institute of Music before meeting David Musumeci and Anthony Egizii from "DNA Songs".

== Music career ==
In 2009, Sorbello signed to Ministry of Sound Australia, and since then has released her debut single, "So Lonely". The single was produced by Sam Littlemore (aka Sam La More ), and was released through Ministry of Sound's Hussle label and Universal Music Australia on 9 April 2010. It has reached number 39 on the ARIA Charts, and number 5 on the ARIA Australian Singles Chart A remix of the single was produced by Hook N Sling and reached number 7 on the ARIA Club Chart. The music video for "So Lonely" premiered on YouTube on 19 March 2010.

Sorbello has gained positive reviews from club appearances in 2009, showcasing her incorporation of fashion, costumes and choreography to her performances. She was part of the line-up for the Supafest Tour in Australia (formerly the Ladies and Gentlemen Tour and The Jamfest Tour), which included Akon, Kelly Rowland, Pitbull, Jay Sean, Sean Paul and Eve. The tour began 13 April 2010 and concluded on 18 April 2010.

== Discography ==
=== Singles ===
List of singles, with selected chart positions
Title	Year	Peak chart positions	
Title	Year	AUS	AUS Artists
"So Lonely"	2010	39	5
"Dangerzone"	2010	—	—
