= Runa Lucienne =

American actress

Runa Alyse Lucienne (born August 6, 1988) is a Guyanese and American model, actress, and social media influencer with over 3 million followers across social media. Beginning her career in her late-teens, Lucienne has appeared in numerous television shows, commercials, music videos, magazines, and national ad campaigns.

== Career ==
Runa Lucienne has been an extra in numerous television shows including Scandal, How I Met Your Mother, Sons of Anarchy, New Girl, Real Husbands of Hollywood, BH90210, Tosh.0, Rob Dyrdek’s Fantasy Factory, The Great Indoors, Hot in Cleveland, Harry’s Law, Hart of Dixie, The Soul Man, Grand Hotel, Mixology, The League, Up All Night, Fox Sports NFL Sunday Pre-Game Show, MTV's Total Request Live, MTV's Suckerfree Sunday, and KTLA Morning News. Runa appeared on Project Runway as Keith Bryce's model who left the competition then returned in the finale to walk at New York Fashion Week for Suede, another designer.

She has been featured in commercials for Adidas, Footlocker, Petco, Sol Republic, and other brands; appeared in music videos including "Baby" by Lil Baby and DaBaby, "Don't Judge Me" by Chris Brown, "Falling in Love" by Taio Cruz and "We Got Hood Love" by Mary J. Blige ft. Trey Songz, and more.

Runa has been featured in magazines such as Elle, Cosmopolitan, King, Slam, DUB Magazine.

Runa’s national ad campaigns include Mandee clothing store, Outre hair company, and Regis Hair Salons.

Runa was the first Guyanese-American Monster Energy Girl. She traveled to various events on behalf of Monster Energy including New York City’s Puerto Rican Day Parade, appearances at Ft. Hood Army/Air Force Base and Ft. Bliss Army/Air Force Base; and multiple DUB Auto Shows.

== Personal life ==
Runa Lucienne was born in Washington D.C., and raised in Toledo, Ohio where she graduated from St. Ursula Academy. Moving to New York City at the age of 18, she began her modeling and acting career while attending Hunter College and later City College of New York.

With an interest in Science, Technology, Engineering, and Mathematics (STEM), she majored in mechanical engineering and in her third year of college was selected for a mechanical engineering internship with NASA at the Johnson Space Center in Houston, TX in the Systems Architecture and Engineering division where she assisted with research and development of upgrades to the low-fidelity Orion cockpit mockup. While in high school she participated in the Junior Engineering Technical Society (JETS), was the president of the Technology club, and completed her first internship with NASA at the University of Michigan.

In addition to her love of science, Runa participated in her schools’ track and field teams in high school and during the freshman year of college. Runa holds her high school’s high jump record and placed 12th in the state of Ohio division 1 state championships during her senior year. In college, she placed 1st in both, the indoor and outdoor, high jump conference championships, and placed 3rd in high jump in the college division of the Colgate Women’s Games held at Madison Square Garden. Before discovering track and field, she studied ballet for 6 years and played basketball until her track and field career began.

Runa Lucienne’s other passions include painting and mixed media art. She debuted her artwork during Art Basel Miami in December 2019 and plans to continue a career in painting and photography -in addition to modeling and acting.

Currently living in Miami, Runa Lucienne enjoys volunteering with her church, Vous Church, the Miami Children's Museum, Paws4You (dog rescue organization), and the Ora Lee Smith Cancer Research Foundation as a volunteer publicist and member of the marketing team.

Runa Lucienne also enjoys traveling and has visited nearly 40 countries.
