= Don't Judge Me =

Single by Chris Brown

from the album Fortune
- Released: August 14, 2012
- Recorded: 2011
- Genre: R&B
- Length: 3:15 (single version); 4:00 (album version)
- Label: RCA
- Songwriters: Chris Brown, Nasri Atweh, Adam Messinger, Mark Pellizzer
- Producer: The Messengers

Chris Brown singles chronology
"Don't Wake Me Up" (2012)	"Don't Judge Me" (2012)	"Algo Me Gusta de Ti" (2012)

Music video
- "Don't Judge Me" on YouTube

"Don't Judge Me" is a song by American singer Chris Brown on his fifth studio album, Fortune (2012). It was produced by the Messengers, and written by Brown, Nasri Atweh, Adam Messinger and Mark "Pelli" Pellizzer. The song was sent to urban contemporary radio stations in the United States on August 14, 2012, as the fifth and final single from the album. "Don't Judge Me" is a midtempo ballad, with lyrics in which Brown asks his lover to forgive him for his past indiscretions and move on with the future.

"Don't Judge Me" received mostly positive reviews from music critics, with some considering it a highlight on Fortune. In the United States, "Don't Judge Me" reached number 10 on the R&B Songs chart, number 18 on the Hot R&B/Hip-Hop Songs chart, and number 67 on the Billboard Hot 100 chart. It also appeared on the singles chart in Australia, Austria, Belgium, France, Germany, Hungary, and the United Kingdom. The accompanying music video was directed by Colin Tilley and Brown. In the video, Brown goes on a "suicide mission" into outer space to save the world from an alien ship invading Earth. The video received a positive reception from most critics, particularly for its presentation.

== Development and release ==
"Don't Judge Me" was produced by the Messengers. The audio mixing was completed by Jaycen Joshua, with assistance from Trehy Harris. Amber "Sevyn" Streeter sang background vocals. The song was supposed to have a guest appearance from Meek Mill, however, because of a feud between him and Brown, his verse was eventually removed from the song. "Don't Judge Me" was leaked on the Internet on June 26, 2012, three days before the official release date of Fortune. The artwork for the song debuted online on July 28, 2012; it features Brown, wearing a "white dress shirt and skinny black tie", striking a pose in front of a blue backdrop. "Don't Judge Me" was sent to urban contemporary radio stations in the United States on August 14, 2012, as the fifth single from the album. On November 2, 2012, the song was released as an extended play in Australia, Canada, France, and New Zealand, featuring the album version and three remixes. The single version of "Don't Judge Me" was released on iTunes Stores in Belgium, Denmark, Ireland, Netherlands, and Sweden on November 23, 2012. A remix extended play, featuring the album version, music video and three remixes, was released in Austria, Germany, and Switzerland on November 23, 2012. In the United States, a remix extended play, featuring the single version and five remixes, was released on November 27, 2012.

== Composition and lyrics ==
"Don't Judge Me" is a midtempo ballad that runs for three minutes and fifteen seconds, with instrumentation provided by drums. Amy Sciarretto of PopCrush noted that "Don't Judge Me" features "a slow, sensuous romp", which she found reminiscent of Michael Jackson. Lyrically, Brown asks his lover to forgive him "for his past indiscretions" and "move on with the future." In the song, Brown encourages his lover that there is nothing going on between him and his ex-girlfriend as he sings, "You're hearing rumors about me / And you can't stomach the thought / Of someone touching my body / When you're so close to my heart / I won't deny what they saying / Because most of it is true / But it was all before I fell for you." He later declares "that he is a changed man who can now be trusted" as shown in the lines, "Take me as I am / Not who I was / I'll promise I'll be / The one that you can trust." During the chorus, Brown sings "So please don't judge me / and I won't judge you / because it could get ugly / before it gets beautiful." Mesfin Fekadu of the Associated Press noted that Brown "sings in his signature semi-high pitch". Rolling Stone's Maura Johnston described "Don't Judge Me" as "a tender love song," while Andrew Hampp of Billboard magazine referred to it as a "take me as I am" type of ballad. Hazel Robinson of California Literary Review noted that "Don't Judge Me" is similar to Brown's 2009 song, "Changed Man."

== Music video ==
=== Background and synopsis ===
The accompanying music video for "Don't Judge Me" was directed by Colin Tilley and Brown, and was filmed in August 2012. On August 29, 2012 Brown released an image from the shoot, showing himself seated on the floor of an abandoned room in an unbuttoned jacket. On September 11, 2012 Brown released a similar image, tweeting, "'Don't Judge Me' video coming soon!". The video premiered on Vimeo on September 27, 2012. It begins with Brown walking through the desert, while intercut scenes of himself sitting in front of a couch (with his girlfriend, played by Runa Lucienne, sleeping behind him) are shown. As the chorus begins for the first time, Brown is seen catching a ride from an army truck. He eventually arrives at an army base to prepare for a "suicide mission", which involves him riding a spacecraft into outer space to save the world from an alien ship invading Earth. A news reporter at the base (Brown's girlfriend) runs to him with the question, "People are saying this is a suicide mission, why are you doing this?" Brown replies, "I'm doing a service for my country and my planet. If that means saving the people I love and I care about, then that's what I'll do." As the spacecraft takes off, tears run down Brown's face before the spacecraft crashes into the alien ship, killing him. Brown and his girlfriend are then shown, hugging on the couch. finale music video. Fortune

=== Reception ===
JusMusic of Singersroom magazine praised the video, writing "This is definitely art at its finest!" A writer for Rap-Up described the video as "cinematic" and "emotional," while Billboard's Erika Ramirez called it an "emotional visual." Jasmine Grant of Juicy magazine noted that the video has a "futuristic soldier at war theme." Colin Greten of MTV's Rapfix agreed, writing that it "has a futuristic look and feel," and that fans would also cry as Brown "makes the ultimate sacrifice" to save the world. A reviewer on The Huffington Post compared Brown's character in the video to actor Bruce Willis in the 1998 film Armageddon, and wrote that "it's certainly memorable, and sure to send Chris Brown's fans – and huge army of critics – into a fresh flutter of support." Idolator's Sam Lansky wrote that "Brown is just as likable and subtle as ever in the video." He continued: "It's impressive to see that Breezy [...] continues to find opportunities to depict himself as a hero", when he makes headlines for the wrong reasons. A writer for Heat magazine stated that the video is "a mini disaster movie, complete with over-acting and melodramatic slow-motion shots."

== Critical reception ==
"Don't Judge Me" generated positive reviews from music critics. Trent Fitzgerald of PopCrush and Mesfin Fekadu of the Associated Press viewed it as one of the standout tracks on Fortune. Amy Sciarretto (also writing for PopCrush), noted that the song "demonstrates that [sensitive] side we don't often see" from Brown. Jamel Coles, in the UAB Kaleidoscope described "Don't Judge Me" as an "emotional track" and wrote, "when hearing songs like this, you can't knock his ability to make good music." Jasmine Grant of Juicy magazine viewed the song as a "heartfelt ballad," and Maura Johnston of Rolling Stone wrote that it sounds like "a Twitter rant against haters." Melissa Ruggieri of The Atlanta Journal-Constitution described "Don't Judge Me" as a "lilting ballad" and noted that Brown is "semi-serious" in the song. A reviewer on 4Music called the song "undeniably emotional" and wrote, "we're wondering is if this is a heart-wrenching plea to Rihanna?" Sharon O'Connell of Time Out magazine commented on the song's title: "it's a little late for that." The Chicago Sun-Times' Thomas Conner called it a "bland, breathy ballad." In his review of Fortune, Nick Levine of BBC Music wrote that the song was one of the reasons why the album felt "cripplingly pointless." Scott Kara of The New Zealand Herald described "Don't Judge Me" as "weak and wincing," and stated that the lyrics are "the words of someone who still doesn't quite grasp the extent of what he has done in the past."

== Chart performance ==
In the United States, "Don't Judge Me" debuted at number 85 on the Billboard Hot R&B/Hip-Hop Songs chart dated September 1, 2012. It peaked at number 18 in the January 26, 2013 issue. On the Billboard R&B Songs chart, the song debuted at number 13 in the October 20, 2012 issue. The following week it rose to number 12, and peaked at number 10 in the November 17, 2012 issue. "Don't Judge Me" peaked at number one on the Bubbling Under Hot 100 Singles chart dated November 3, 2012, before it debuted at number 95 on the Billboard Hot 100 chart dated November 17, 2012. The song peaked at number 67 in the January 5, 2013 issue. On October 13, 2012, "Don't Judge Me" debuted at numbers 84 and 17 on the UK Singles Chart and UK R&B Chart respectively. The following week, it rose to number 42 on the UK Singles Chart and number eight on the UK R&B Chart. The song peaked at number seven on the UK R&B Chart dated October 27, 2012. In Belgium, "Don't Judge Me" peaked at number two on the Ultratip Flanders chart, and number 25 on the Ultratip Wallonia chart. On the French Singles Chart, it debuted at number 168 on October 13, 2012, and peaked at number 22 on January 12, 2013. In Hungary, "Don't Judge Me" debuted and peaked at number 10 on November 26, 2012. On December 7, 2012, the song debuted on the Austria Singles Chart at number 66. In Australia, "Don't Judge Me" debuted at number 44 on the ARIA Singles Chart dated December 10, 2012. The following week, it ascended to number 42.

== Formats and track listings ==
- Digital download
1. "Please Don't Judge Me" – 3:15
- Digital Remix EP
1. "Don't Judge Me" (Dave Audé Radio Mix) – 3:28
2. "Don't Judge Me" (Dave Audé Extended Mix) – 5:07
3. "Don't Judge Me" – 4:00
4. "Don't Judge Me" (Fuego Extended Club Mix) – 4:22
5. "Don't Judge Me" (Music video) – 4:51
- Digital EP
1. "Don't Judge Me" (Dave Audé LP Remix) – 3:59
2. "Don't Judge Me" – 4:00
3. "Don't Judge Me" (Fuego Radio Mix) – 3:29
4. "Don't Judge Me" (Ark Angel Moombah Mix) – 3:20
- US Digital Remix EP
1. "Don't Judge Me" (Dave Audé Radio Mix) – 3:28
2. "Don't Judge Me" (Dave Audé Extended Mix) – 5:07
3. "Don't Judge Me" (Fuego Extended Club Mix) – 4:22
4. "Don't Judge Me" (Isa the Machine Remix) – 3:38
5. "Don't Judge Me" (Isa the Machine Remix) [No Drum] – 3:38
6. "Please Don't Judge Me" – 3:15

== Credits and personnel ==
Credits adapted from the liner notes for Fortune

- Nasri Atweh – songwriter, producer
- Chris Brown – lead vocals, songwriter
- Iain Findley – assistant recorder
- Trehy Harris – assistant mixer
- Jaycen Joshua – mixer
- The Messengers – producer
- Adam Messinger – songwriter, producer
- Mark Pellizzer – songwriter
- Brian Springer – recorder
- Amber "Sevyn" Streeter – background vocals

== Charts ==
=== Weekly charts ===
Weekly chart performance for "Don't Judge Me"
Chart (2012–2013)	Peak position
Australia (ARIA)	42
Austria (Ö3 Austria Top 40)	66
Belgium (Ultratip Bubbling Under Flanders)	2
Belgium (Ultratip Bubbling Under Wallonia)	25
France (SNEP)	22
Germany (GfK)	38
Hungary (Single Top 40)	10
UK Singles (Official Charts)	42
UK Hip Hop/R&B (Official Charts)	7
US Billboard Hot 100	67
US Adult R&B Songs (Billboard)	39
US Hot R&B/Hip-Hop Songs (Billboard)	18
US R&B/Hip-Hop Airplay (Billboard)	3
US Rhythmic Airplay (Billboard)	36

=== Year-end charts ===
2013 year-end chart performance for "Don't Judge Me"
Chart (2013)	Position
US Hot R&B/Hip-Hop Songs (Billboard)	69

== Certifications ==
Certifications for "Don't Judge Me"
Region	Certification	Certified units/sales
Australia (ARIA)	Gold	35,000^{‡}
New Zealand (RMNZ)	Gold	15,000^{‡}
United Kingdom (BPI)	Silver	200,000^{‡}
United States (RIAA)	2× Platinum	2,000,000^{‡}
^{‡} Sales+streaming figures based on certification alone.

== Release history ==
Country	Date	Format	Label
United States	August 14, 2012	Urban contemporary radio	RCA Records
Australia	November 2, 2012	Digital EP	RCA Records
Canada	November 2, 2012	Digital EP	RCA Records
France	November 2, 2012	Digital EP	RCA Records
New Zealand	November 2, 2012	Digital EP	RCA Records
United Kingdom	November 18, 2012	Digital EP	RCA Records
Belgium	November 23, 2012	Digital download	RCA Records
Denmark	November 23, 2012	Digital download	RCA Records
Ireland	November 23, 2012	Digital download	RCA Records
Netherlands	November 23, 2012	Digital download	RCA Records
Sweden	November 23, 2012	Digital download	RCA Records
Austria	November 23, 2012	Digital Remix EP	RCA Records
Germany	November 23, 2012	Digital Remix EP	RCA Records
Switzerland	November 23, 2012	Digital Remix EP	RCA Records
United States	November 27, 2012	Digital Remix EP	RCA Records
