= Bassline (Chris Brown song) =

Song performed by Chris Brown

Song by Chris Brown

from the album Fortune
- Genre: Dubstep; electropop; electrohop
- Length: 3:58
- Label: RCA
- Songwriters: Andrea Simms; Andrew "Pop" Wansel; Chris Brown; David Johnson; Robert Calloway; Ronald "Flippa" Colson; Warren "Oak" Felder
- Producers: Pop Wansel; Dayvi Jae

Audio video
- "Bassline" on YouTube

"Bassline" is a song by American singer Chris Brown, taken from his fifth studio album Fortune (2012). It was written by Andrea Simms, Andrew "Pop" Wansel, Brown, David Johnson, Robert Calloway, Ronald "Flippa" Colson and Warren "Oak" Felder. The song was produced by Pop Wansel and Dayvi Jae. Musically, "Bassline" is a dubstep, electropop and electrohop song, which incorporates elements of reggae. Instrumentation is provided by a wobble bass and synthesizers. The song contains lyrics about Brown telling a woman to leave the nightclub with him. "Bassline" garnered mixed reviews from music critics; some reviewers noted it as one of the standout tracks on the album, while others criticized the song's production and lyrics. It also received comparisons to the songs by Kesha and LMFAO. Upon the release of Fortune, "Bassline" debuted at numbers 28 and 122 on the UK R&B Chart and UK Singles Chart, respectively.

== Development and composition ==
"Bassline" was written by Andrea Simms, Andrew "Pop" Wansel, Chris Brown, David Johnson, Robert Calloway, Ronald "Flippa" Colson and Warren "Oak" Felder. The song was produced by Pop Wansel and Dayvi Jae. "Bassline" was recorded by Brian Springer with assistance from Iain Findley. The recordings were later mixed by Jaycen Joshua with assistance by Trehy Harris. Musically, "Bassline" is a dubstep, electropop and electrohop song, that incorporates elements of reggae. The song lasts for three minutes and 58 seconds. Instrumentation consists of a wobble bass and synthesizers. Melinda Newman of HitFix compared "Bassline" to the songs by Kesha and LMFAO. Trent Fitzgerald of PopCrush noted that the lyrics are about Brown trying to "convince a hot girl he spots in the club to come back to his crib", in which he sings "Hey girl tell me what you talk / Pretty as a picture on the wall / Hey girl you can get it all / Cause I know you like the way the beat go". Brown also declares, "You heard about my image / But I could give a flying motherfuck who's offended". Hayley Avron of Contactmusic.com noted that a robot voice joins Brown in the hook "Girls like my bassline". Hazel Robinson of California Literary Review magazine noted that the word "bassline" is a metaphor for penis.

== Critical reception ==
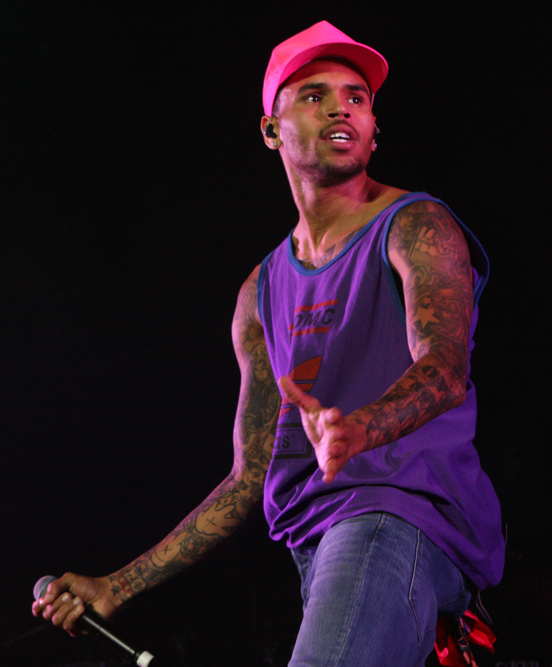
One reviewer criticized the song as "a lazy attempt" from Brown.

"Bassline" garnered mixed to negative reviews from music critics. Sam Wilbur of AOL Radio viewed it as "the best example" of dubstep tracks on Fortune, while Kyle Anderson of Entertainment Weekly noted it as one of the album's best tracks. Scott Kara of The New Zealand Herald called the song "irritating" and noted it as "blatant copycat stuff". Digital Spy's Lewis Corner felt that "Bassline" was "a lazy attempt" from Brown. Randall Roberts of Los Angeles Times stated that the worst part of the song is the hook. Hazel Robinson of California Literary Review magazine was critical of the production and lyrics, labeling it as "bad" and "dodgy". Allmusic's Andy Kellman noted that Brown "clearly feels more emboldened than ever" on "Bassline".

== Chart performance ==
Upon the release of Fortune, due to digital sales, "Bassline" debuted on the UK R&B Chart at number 28 in the issue dated July 14, 2012. It also debuted at number 122 on the UK Singles Chart.

== Credits and personnel ==
Credits adapted from the liner notes for Fortune

- Chris Brown – lead vocals, songwriter
- Robert Calloway – songwriter
- Ronald "Flippa" Colson – songwriter
- Warren "Oak" Felder – songwriter
- Iain Findley – assistant recorder
- Trehy Harris – assistant mixer
- Dayvi Jae – producer
- David Johnson – songwriter
- Jaycen Joshua – mixer
- Andrea Simms – songwriter
- Brian Springer – recorder
- Andrew "Pop" Wansel – songwriter, producer

== Charts ==
Chart performance for "Bassline"
Chart (2012)	Peak position
UK R&B (Official Charts Company)	28
UK Singles (Official Charts Company)	122
