= Turn Up the Music (Chris Brown song) =

2012 single by Chris Brown

Single by Chris Brown

from the album Fortune
- Released: February 7, 2012
- Recorded: 2011
- Studio: The Record Plant (Los Angeles, California); Mason Sound (North Hollywood, California)
- Genre: Electro house
- Length: 3:49
- Label: RCA
- Songwriters: Alexander "Fuego" Palmer; Chris Brown; Damon Thomas; Harvey Mason Jr.; Michael "Mike J" Jimenez; Terence Coles; Greg Bonnick; Leon Price; Hayden Chapman; Peter Renshaw
- Producers: Fuego; The Underdogs

Chris Brown singles chronology
"Why Stop Now" (2011)	"Turn Up the Music" (2012)	"Birthday Cake" (2012)

Music video
- "Turn Up The Music" on YouTube

"Turn Up the Music" is a song by American singer Chris Brown. It was written by Alexander "Fuego" Palmer, Brown, Damon Thomas, Harvey Mason Jr., Michael "Mike J" Jimenez, Terence Coles and Agent X, while production was handled by Fuego and The Underdogs. "Turn Up the Music" was sent to contemporary hit radio playlists in the United States on February 7, 2012, as the lead single from Brown's fifth studio album Fortune (2012). It was released for digital download on February 10, 2012 by RCA Records. "Turn Up the Music" is an uptempo song which draws from the genres of electronic dance and house. Instrumentation consists of pulsating beats, synthesizers, a "throbbing bass" and percussion. According to Mason Jr., the song's inspiration came from visualizing Brown as an artist, "how he dances and how he performs, and giving him something to match that energy."

"Turn Up the Music" garnered positive reviews from music critics, who complimented its production and compared the song to Brown's previous singles "Forever" (2008) and "Yeah 3x" (2010), for its similar musical direction. Critics also noted its similarities to the work of LMFAO and David Guetta. "Turn Up the Music" achieved commercial success worldwide, becoming Brown's first number one single on the UK Singles Chart, and his eleventh top ten single on the US Billboard Hot 100 chart. The song also reached the top ten in Australia and New Zealand, and the top twenty in Canada, Hungary, Ireland and Slovakia. It was certified double platinum by the Australian Recording Industry Association (ARIA), and gold by the Recording Industry Association of New Zealand (RIANZ).

The accompanying music video for "Turn Up the Music" was directed by Godfrey Taberez and Brown, and filmed in Los Angeles, California. It features Brown at a party filled with masked people, where he performs heavily choreographed dance routines. The video garnered positive reception from critics, for its series of dance sequences which were compared to Michael Jackson. It won Best Male Video and Best Choreography at the 2012 MTV Video Music Awards, and earned Taberez and Brown a nomination for Video Director of the Year at the 2012 BET Awards. Brown promoted the song with live performances on televised shows and awards ceremonies, including Dancing with the Stars, Today, the 2012 NBA All-Star Game halftime show, the 54th Grammy Awards, the 2012 Billboard Music Awards and the 2012 BET Awards. He also included the song in his set list at Supafest Australia. The official remix of "Turn Up the Music" premiered online on February 20, 2012, and features Brown's former girlfriend Rihanna.

== Background and release ==
"Turn Up the Music" was written by Alexander "Fuego" Palmer, Chris Brown, Damon Thomas, Harvey Mason Jr., Michael "Mike J" Jimenez, Terence Cole and Agent X. Production for the song was handled by Fuego and The Underdogs. The mixing engineering process was completed by John Hanes with assistance by Phil Seaford, while the audio mixing was completed by Serban Ghenea. "Turn Up the Music" was recorded at The Record Plant in Los Angeles, California and Mason Sound in North Hollywood, California by Andrew Hey and Brian Springer with assistance by Iain Findley. In an interview with MTV News, Mason Jr. revealed that inspiration for the song came from visualizing Brown as an artist. He explained, "The inspiration was really him as an artist, visualizing how he dances and how he performs, and giving him something to match that energy."

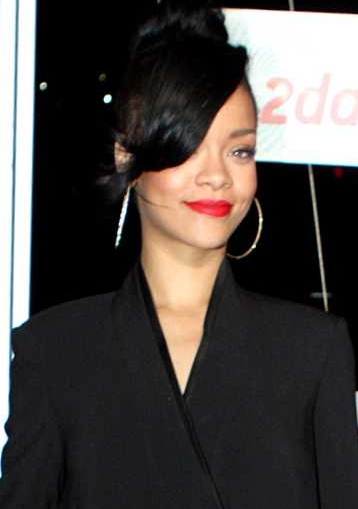
The official remix of "Turn Up the Music" features Brown's ex-girlfriend Rihanna.

On January 25, 2012, Brown announced via his official Twitter account that the lead single from his fifth studio album Fortune would be called "Turn Up the Music", tweeting "New FORTUNE single coming 1/26!!! TURN UP THE MUSIC!!!!". It replaced "Biggest Fan" and "One Of Those Nights", which had each previously been announced as the lead single. The following day, both the single and its artwork were posted online, showing Brown wearing an unbuttoned shirt and a fedora, while words in different languages are displayed. "Turn Up the Music" was officially sent to contemporary hit radio playlists in the United States on February 7, 2012. It was released as a one-track digital download in Oceania and most European countries on February 10, 2012. However, in the United Kingdom, "Turn Up the Music" was released as a three-track digital download on March 25, 2012, which contained Brown's previous single "Strip" and the Invaderz remix of "Yeah 3x" (2010). It was also released as a two-track CD single in Germany on April 6, 2012, including "Strip" as a B-side.

An unofficial remix of "Turn Up the Music" made by DJ Pauly D, premiered on Ryan Seacrest's morning radio show On Air with Ryan Seacrest on February 14, 2012. The official remix of "Turn Up the Music" premiered online on February 20, 2012, and features Brown's former girlfriend Rihanna. Brown previously hinted via Twitter that Rihanna would be the featured artist on the remix, after rumors that he would feature on the remix of her single "Birthday Cake" (2012) sparked media controversy, due to the fact that Brown physically assaulted Rihanna before a Pre-Grammy Awards party in 2009. The remix marks the first collaboration from the two singers since they last collaborated on "Bad Girl" (2009).

== Composition and lyrics ==
"Turn Up the Music"
A 23-second sample of part of the chorus of "Turn Up the Music", which instrumentation includes pulsating beats, synthesizers and percussion.

"Turn Up the Music" is an uptempo electronic dance, and house song, which last for a duration of three minutes and forty-nine seconds. Instrumentation is provided by pulsating beats, synthesizers and percussion. Rap-Up described the production as "synth-heavy". The second verse opens with Brown singing "Turn up the music cause the sun just came up / Turn up the music if they try to turn us down / Turn up the music cause I'm trying to hear the speakers blow / Turn up the music, fill your cup and drink it down". It is then followed by repeated chants of "If you're sexy and you know it put your hands up in the air". Jason Lipshutz of Billboard noted that the chanting was a reference to LMFAO's "Sexy and I Know It" (2011). Andy Kellman of AllMusic likened the song to Baltimora's "Tarzan Boy" (1985). The song's hook resembles the hook in Toulouse by Nicky Romero. It is written in a key of C# major and composed with a tempo of 130 beats per minute.

== Music video ==
=== Background ===
We wanted to make sure that people, when they watch this, they feel like they're in this video ... We wanted to give it personality, we wanted to make it fun, we wanted everybody to see this and wish they were there.
—Godfrey Taberez on the video's development.

The accompanying music video for "Turn Up the Music" was directed by Godfrey Taberez and Brown, and filmed in Los Angeles, California on February 1–2, 2012. It was produced by Andrew Listermann of Riveting Entertainment. On February 2, 2012, Brown revealed details about the video via his official Twitter account, tweeting "I'll let you guys judge but this Turn Up the music video hands down is probably my best video by far!!!". Several images from the shoot were leaked online the same day, showing Brown in the passenger seat of a classic car, and standing shirtless on top of a vehicle with a group of people. Another image showed one of the dancer's face covered with a "wild mask". A behind-the-scenes video clip was posted online on February 14, 2012. The video showed Brown, dressed in a black suit, performing dance routines with several backup dancers in a club, surrounded by people wearing animal heads. Another scene showed Brown dancing in the rain and in the streets. The music video premiered online on February 17, 2012, and features a cameo appearance by hip hop trio The Rej3ctz.

=== Synopsis ===
A screenshot of Brown (pictured) hailing a futuristic hover-cab in the music video.

The video is set at night and opens with Brown, dressed in a black suit, drinking alcohol in the streets, before hailing a futuristic hover-cab. Brown asks the cab driver to take him to the best spot in town. He then asks the driver to turn up the air conditioner because he's hot, but the driver turns up the music instead, while wearing a horse mask on his head. As the song begins, Brown exits the cab and arrives at a street party filled with people wearing animal heads. He then enters a club, where he performs the first dance sequence in the video with his male backup dancers. During the first chorus, Brown arrives inside the main room of the club filled with flashing lights and people dancing while wearing animal heads. After a hat gets tossed to him by one of his dancers in the crowd, Brown and his backup dancers perform another dance sequence as the queen of the party watches them from her perch. These party scenes are intercut with scenes of Brown dancing alone in another room surrounded by flashing lights and speakers in the background.

During the second chorus, Brown enters another room surrounded by people in animal heads, and performs the third dance sequence in the video with his backup dancers. Towards the end of the chorus, Brown and his dancers appear back inside the main room and continue dancing. At one point, the video is slowed down as Brown and his dancers do flips. In other scenes, he is seen dancing alone with a cane in a rain-filled room, wearing white dress pants, a black tank top and a fedora. Brown then splits into three people, comes back together, takes off his shirt and throws it at the camera, causing its lens to crack.

=== Reception ===
The music video received positive reviews from critics. Rap-Up called the video "electrifying" and complimented the "slickly-choreographed routines" performed by Brown. Andrew Martin of Prefix magazine praised Brown's "killer dance moves". Katie Hasty of HitFix gave the video a positive review, writing "there is a serious series of sweeping dance shots that may impress the hating-est of haters". Jacob Moore of Complex magazine noted that the dance party scenes is what "you'd expect from a Breezy video". Meena Rupani of DesiHits felt that the video took her "into a whole different world" that reminded her of the films Eyes Wide Shut (1999) and Men in Black (1997). Rupani also described it as "extremely futuristic and looks like it belongs in the year 2030". Jocelyn Vena of MTV News called it an "eye-popping video" and noted that there were several outfits Brown wore that paid homage to Michael Jackson. A reviewer for Capital FM praised Brown's "impressive dance routines" and noted that it was "similar to that of a Michael Jackson show". This was echoed by Amy Sciarretto of PopCrush who wrote that Brown's dance routines were "quite reminiscent of Michael Jackson and his classic, dance-driven videos". Joey of WXRK found the video to "be a hybrid between Michael Jackson's 'Smooth Criminal', a party that Ke$ha would be at, and that scene from Fame when everyone is dancing in the streets on top of cabs and cars". The video earned Brown and Taberez a nomination for Video Director of the Year at the 2012 BET Awards. It won Best Male Video and Best Choreography at the 2012 MTV Video Music Awards. On September 19, 2012, the video received a nomination at the 2012 Soul Train Music Awards for Best Dance Performance.

== Live performances ==
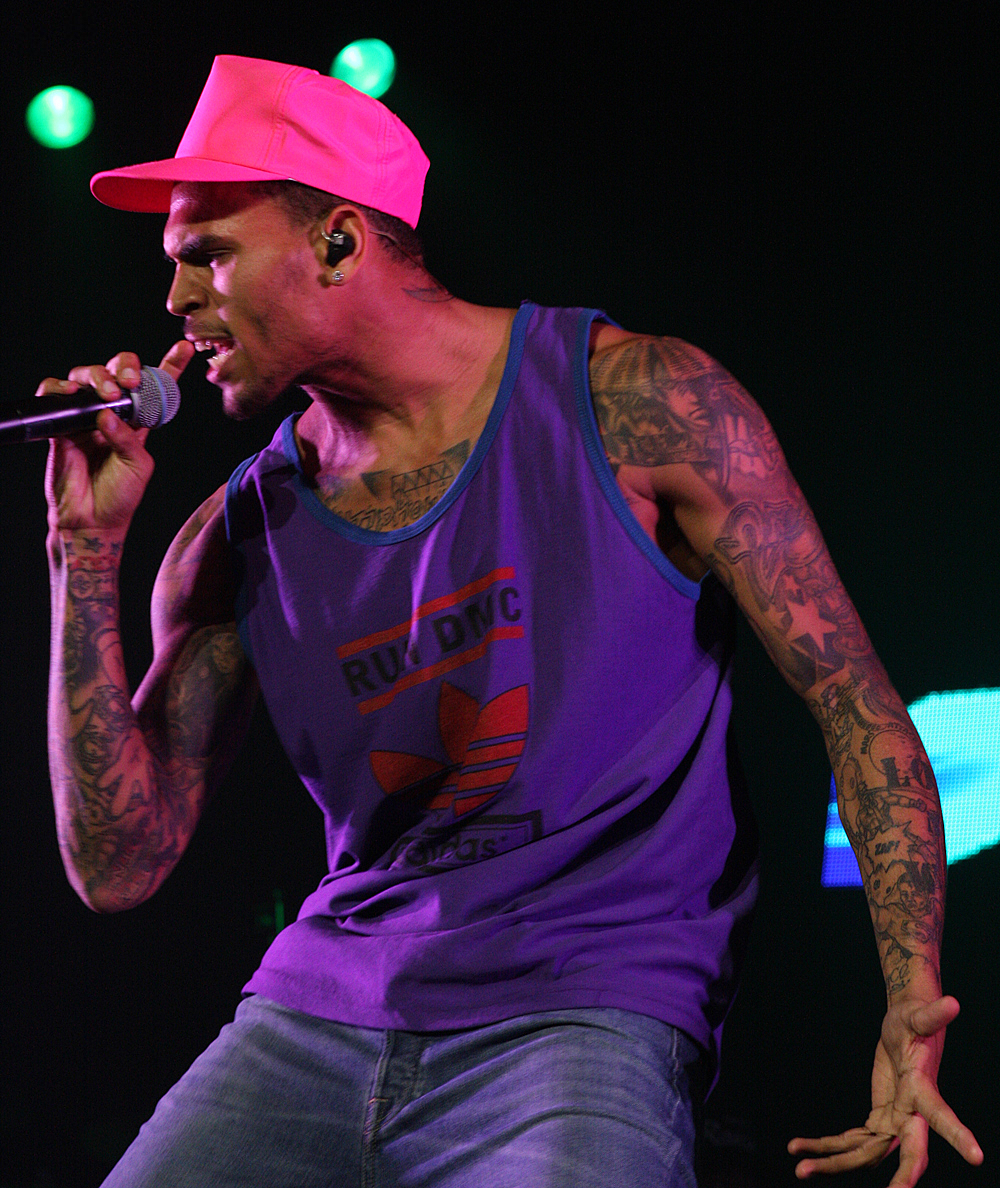
Brown performing at Supafest in Australia, April 2012.

"Turn Up the Music" was performed live for the first time at the 54th Grammy Awards ceremony, which took place at the Staples Center in Los Angeles, California on February 12, 2012. Brown performed the song as part of a medley with "Beautiful People" from F.A.M.E. (2011). He was dressed in a white and gray varsity jacket, white pants and sparkling sneakers. Brown and his backup dancers performed heavily choreographed routines to "Turn Up the Music" atop a collection of blocks, which changed from colors red to blue to yellow and green. He then sang "Beautiful People" as he jumped across the blocks, while the dancers followed in a high-flying routine. The performance ended when Brown saluted to the audience before he took a bow. Rob Markman of MTV News noted that the blocks "resembled the 1980s arcade game Q*bert", while Evelyn McDonnell of Los Angeles Times noted that Brown lip-synched his performance. Andrew Martin of Prefix magazine wrote that it was one of the worst performances at the Grammy Awards due to the fact that he lip-synched. The performance was made available for download via the iTunes Store in the United States on February 15, 2012.

Brown performed a shortened version of "Turn Up the Music" during the halftime show of the 2012 NBA All-Star Game in Orlando on February 26, 2012. In April 2012, Brown performed the song during his set at Supafest Australia, as part of a set list, which included "Run It!", "Yeah 3x", "Look at Me Now", "She Ain't You", "Wet the Bed", "Body 2 Body" and "Birthday Cake". Rap-Up wrote that "A tatted Chris Brown thrilled with his chart-topping hits". On May 8, 2012, Brown performed the song on Dancing with the Stars. He later performed "Turn Up the Music" at the 2012 Billboard Music Awards ceremony, which took place at the MGM Grand Garden Arena in Paradise, Nevada on May 20, 2012. Brown wore a leopard fur-lined jacket, waxed pants, Air Jordan sneakers and a bandana. The performance began when Brown entered the stage on a fluorescent bike and asked his astronaut doll to activate the fun zone. The fluorescent and graffitied-drawn backdrop then lit up as several dancers appeared onstage and performed with Brown, while "BMX bike riders performed several high-flying tricks" on bike ramps behind them. The performance received a mixed response from celebrities, most notably Joe Jonas, Pink and Carey Hart, who all criticized Brown for lip-synching.

On June 8, 2012, Brown performed "Turn Up the Music" on Today as part of its Summer Concert Series, for which he wore a New York Yankees cap, a multicolored Snow Beach Polo jacket, black jeans and white sneakers. The set list also included "Don't Wake Me Up", "Yeah 3x" and "Forever". Brown later performed a medley of "Turn Up the Music" and "Don't Wake Me Up" at the 2012 BET Awards ceremony on July 1, 2012, for which he appeared shirtless for the performance with half his body spray painted in grey. Brown performed acrobatic moves with six backup dancers "under triangle-shaped beams" as green and red flashing lights appeared throughout the stage. Georgette Cline of The Boombox wrote that Brown "put on an energetic show" and described his dance routines during the performance as "eye-catching".

== Critical reception ==
"Turn Up the Music" garnered positive reviews from music critics, who complimented its production. Christina Garibaldi of MTV News noted that the song is similar to "Yeah 3x", and that it "is destined to get people in the clubs and on the dance floor". Georgette Cline of The Boombox described it as a "dance-inspired track" that "will undeniably move partygoers to showcase their best moves". Liz Barker of MTV Buzzworthy described it as an "undeniably dance floor-ready" track that "deserves to be played at maximum decibels". Jim Farber of the Daily News viewed "Turn Up the Music" as one of the standout tracks on Fortune. A reviewer for Rap-Up described "Turn Up the Music" as a "party anthem" that "is bound to become the soundtrack for clubgoers everywhere". Bryan of radio station WNOW-FM wrote that the song sees Brown taking his "music to the next level!".

Mark Iraheta of Complex magazine called "Turn Up the Music" a "soon-to-be smash" that will see Brown making "substantial damage on the Top 100 charts". Robbie Daw of Idolator described the song as "energetic" and wrote that it follows in the footsteps of Brown's past hits "Forever" (2008) and "Yeah 3x", "but with more dancefloor urgency". Daw concluded by writing that the song "should please the same crowd" that listen to the music of LMFAO, Kesha and Lady Gaga. Melinda Newman of HitFix described "Turn Up the Music" as a cousin to LMFAO's "Party Rock Anthem" (2011), and called it "an absolute smash". Scott Shelter of PopCrush awarded the song three and a half stars out of four, and noted its similarities to the work of David Guetta and LMFAO. Shetler also commented that the production was lacking originality and the song "isn't going to blow anyone away from a lyrical perspective". Andrew Martin of Prefix magazine was critical of the song, writing that it sounds like a left over track from Guetta's album Nothing but the Beat (2011). At the 2012 BET Awards, "Turn Up the Music" was nominated for the Viewer's Choice Award.

== Chart performance ==
In Australia, "Turn Up the Music" debuted on the ARIA Singles Chart at number thirteen on February 20, 2012, becoming the highest new entry for that week. The song also entered the ARIA Urban Singles Chart at number six. The following week, "Turn Up the Music" ascended to number six on the ARIA Singles Chart and number four on the ARIA Urban Singles Chart. The song was certified double platinum by the Australian Recording Industry Association (ARIA), denoting shipments of 140,000 units. In New Zealand, "Turn Up the Music" debuted and peaked at number nine on February 20, 2012, and spent 11 weeks in the chart. The song was certified gold by the Recording Industry Association of New Zealand (RIANZ), denoting shipments of 7,500 copies.

In the United States, "Turn Up the Music" entered the Pop Songs chart at number 36 on the chart dated February 25, 2012, becoming the highest debut for that week. It also gained airplay and entered the Radio Songs chart at number 71. Following Brown's performance of the song at the 54th Grammy Awards, "Turn Up the Music" debuted on the Digital Songs chart at number nine on the chart dated March 3, 2012, with 180,000 copies sold. That same week, the song debuted and peaked at number ten on the Billboard Hot 100, giving Brown his eleventh top ten single on the chart. "Turn Up the Music" also saw a 27% increase in airplay to 21 million audience impressions, moving from number 71 to number 56 on the Radio Songs chart. On the chart dated March 24, 2012, the song peaked at number 24 on the Radio Songs chart. As of August 2012, "Turn Up the Music" has sold a million digital copies in the United States. In Canada, "Turn Up the Music" entered the Canadian Hot 100 at number 38 on the chart dated March 3, 2012. It peaked at number nineteen on April 14, 2012, and spent four weeks in the chart.

"Turn Up the Music" also reached the top twenty in some European countries. It peaked at number fifteen on the Hungarian Airplay Chart, and number 20 on the Slovak Airplay Chart. On the Irish Singles Chart, "Turn Up the Music" peaked at number 12 and spent 18 weeks in the chart. In the United Kingdom, the song first charted on March 10, 2012, in a cover version by Beautiful People, reaching the top 100. On April 7, 2012, the Chris Brown version, having sold 83,777 copies in its first week, became Brown's first UK number one single. That same week, it also debuted at number one on the Scottish Singles Chart. "Turn Up the Music" has sold 273,000 copies in the UK as of December 2012.

== Formats and track listing ==
- Digital download
1. "Turn Up the Music" – 3:49
- Digital download – Live at the 54th Grammy Awards
1. "Turn Up the Music" / "Beautiful People" – 4:07
2. "Turn Up the Music" / "Beautiful People" (Video) – 4:07
- German CD single
1. "Turn Up the Music" – 3:49
2. "Strip" (featuring Kevin McCall) – 2:49
- UK digital download
1. "Turn Up the Music" – 3:49
2. "Strip" (featuring Kevin McCall) – 2:49
3. "Yeah 3x" (Invaderz Remix) – 4:05

== Credits and personnel ==
- Chris Brown – lead vocals, songwriter
- Terence Cole – songwriter
- Iain Findley – assistant recorder
- Serban Ghenea – mixer
- John Hanes – mix engineer
- Andrew Hey – recorder
- Michael "Mike Jay" Jiminez – songwriter, background vocals
- Alexander "Fuego" Palmer – songwriter, producer
- Phil Seaford – assistant mix engineer
- Brian Springer – recorder
- The Underdogs – songwriter, producer
- Greg Bonnick, Leon Price and Hayden Chapman (Agent X) – songwriters

== Charts ==
=== Weekly charts ===
Weekly chart performance for "Turn Up the Music"
Chart (2012)	Peak position
Australia (ARIA)	6
Australia Urban (ARIA)	4
Austria (Ö3 Austria Top 40)	26
Belgium (Ultratop 50 Flanders)	28
Belgium (Ultratop 50 Wallonia)	31
Brazil (Billboard Brasil Hot 100)	65
Brazil Hot Pop Songs	27
Canada (Canadian Hot 100)	19
Croatia (Airplay Radio Chart)	74
Czech Republic (IFPI)	44
Denmark (Tracklisten)	21
France (SNEP)	39
Germany (GfK)	34
Hungary (Rádiós Top 40)	15
Ireland (IRMA)	12
Japan (Japan Hot 100)	8
Mexico (Monitor Latino)	27
Netherlands (Dutch Top 40)	24
Netherlands (Single Top 100)	30
New Zealand (Recorded Music NZ)	9
Romania (Airplay 100)	49
Scottish Singles Sales (Official Charts)	1
Slovakia (Rádio Top 100 Oficiálna)	20
South Korea International Singles (Gaon)	12
Sweden (Sverigetopplistan)	33
Switzerland (Schweizer Hitparade)	39
UK Hip Hop/R&B (Official Charts)	1
UK Singles (Official Charts)	1
US Billboard Hot 100	10
US Dance Airplay (Billboard)	7
US Dance Club Songs (Billboard)	19
US Hot R&B/Hip-Hop Songs (Billboard)	81
US Latin Pop Airplay (Billboard)	40
US Pop Airplay (Billboard)	18
US Rhythmic Airplay (Billboard)	7
US Tropical Airplay (Billboard)	36

=== Year-end charts ===
2012 year-end chart performance for "Turn Up the Music"
Chart (2012)	Position
Australia (ARIA)	70
Australia Urban (ARIA)	21
Belgium Dance (Ultratop Flanders)	23
Belgium Dance (Ultratop Wallonia)	41
Brazil (Crowley)	70
Canada (Canadian Hot 100)	68
France (SNEP)	142
Japan (Japan Hot 100)	88
Netherlands (Download Top 100)	98
Netherlands (Dutch Top 40)	124
UK Singles (Official Charts Company)	79
US Billboard Hot 100	84

== Certifications ==
Certifications for "Turn Up the Music"
Region	Certification	Certified units/sales
Australia (ARIA)	3× Platinum	210,000^{^}
Japan (RIAJ)	Gold	100,000^{*}
New Zealand (RMNZ)	Gold	7,500^{*}
Norway (IFPI Norway)	2× Platinum	20,000^{*}
Sweden (GLF)	Platinum	40,000^{‡}
United Kingdom (BPI)	Gold	400,000^{‡}
United States (RIAA)	2× Platinum	2,000,000^{‡}
Streaming
Denmark (IFPI Danmark)	Platinum	1,800,000^{†}
^{*} Sales figures based on certification alone.^{^} Shipments figures based on certification alone.^{‡} Sales+streaming figures based on certification alone.^{†} Streaming-only figures based on certification alone.

== Release history ==
Country	Date	Format	Version	Label
United States	February 7, 2012	Contemporary hit radio	Airplay	RCA Records
Australia	February 10, 2012	Digital download	Single version	RCA Records
Austria	February 10, 2012	Digital download	Single version	RCA Records
Belgium	February 10, 2012	Digital download	Single version	RCA Records
Canada	February 10, 2012	Digital download	Single version	RCA Records
Denmark	February 10, 2012	Digital download	Single version	RCA Records
Finland	February 10, 2012	Digital download	Single version	RCA Records
France	February 10, 2012	Digital download	Single version	RCA Records
Germany	February 10, 2012	Digital download	Single version	RCA Records
Ireland	February 10, 2012	Digital download	Single version	RCA Records
Italy	February 10, 2012	Digital download	Single version	RCA Records
Netherlands	February 10, 2012	Digital download	Single version	RCA Records
New Zealand	February 10, 2012	Digital download	Single version	RCA Records
Norway	February 10, 2012	Digital download	Single version	RCA Records
Portugal	February 10, 2012	Digital download	Single version	RCA Records
Spain	February 10, 2012	Digital download	Single version	RCA Records
Sweden	February 10, 2012	Digital download	Single version	RCA Records
Switzerland	February 10, 2012	Digital download	Single version	RCA Records
United States	February 14, 2012	Digital download	Single version	RCA Records
United States	February 15, 2012	Digital download	54th Grammy Awards performance	RCA Records
United Kingdom	March 25, 2012	Digital download	Single version	RCA Records
Germany	April 6, 2012	CD single	Single version	RCA Records

== See also ==
- List of number-one hits of 2012 (Scotland)
- List of number-one hits of 2012 (UK)
