= Supafest =

Music festival in Australia (2010–2012)

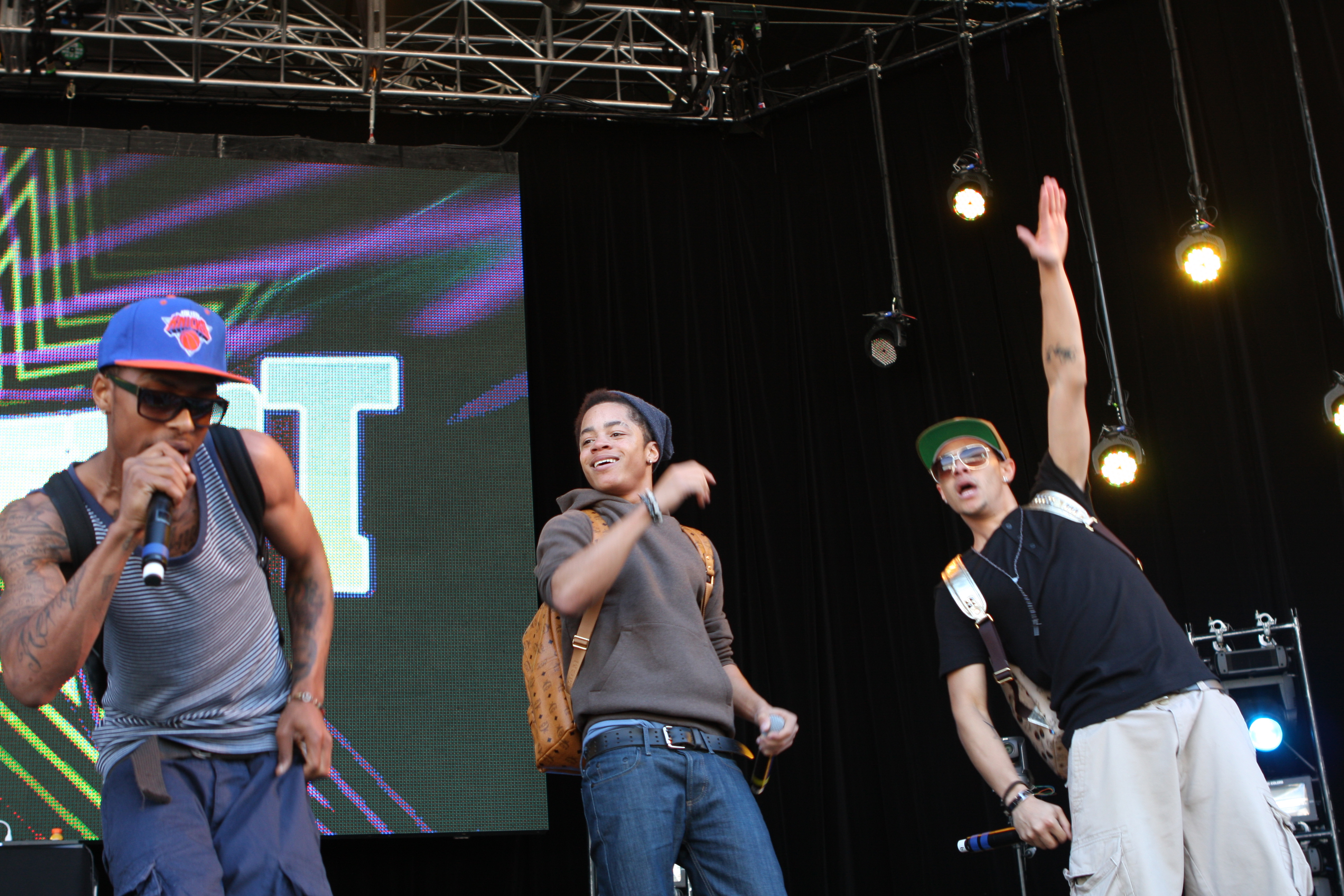
- Genre: Urban; R&B; hip-hop; rap; pop
- Dates: April
- Locations: Australia; Adelaide (2010); Brisbane (2010–2012); Melbourne (2010–2012); Perth (2010–2012); Sydney (2010–2012)
- Years active: 2010–2012
- Website: Official website

Supafest was an annual music festival held in Australia during April, created by Paper Chase Touring and Entertainment. It started in 2010, spreading out to in five major capital cities (Adelaide, Brisbane, Melbourne, Perth, Sydney), though in 2011 the festival was reduced to four shows with the Adelaide leg withdrawn as well as the second show in Sydney. Dubbed as Australia's largest urban music festival, the festival promises to deliver some of the most exciting and leading performers in the urban music world.

== History ==
The festival began in 2010 with an announcement in December 2009 introducing the "Ladies And Gentlemen Tour", scheduled for February 2010 with Ne-Yo, Pitbull, Kelly Rowland and Chris Sorbello. After this was announced the show was renamed into "Jamfest" in February 2010 and was rescheduled for April 2010. Due to a potential legal conflict, the promoters changed the name again to "Supafest".

Supafest Australia kicked off in Adelaide, 13 April 2010 and ended in Perth on 18 April 2010. The tours headlining acts were Akon, Kelly Rowland, Jay Sean, Sean Paul, Pitbull and Eve. Each city had separate opening acts. Tickets for the Sydney show on 15 April were quickly sold out. A second show in Sydney on 16 April had been scheduled due to ticket demands. The organisers of the festival expanded the Supafest to one show outside of Australia and tried to place it at Colombo, Sri Lanka, but was later cancelled. Akon didn't get a Visa for Sri Lanka.

Since 2010 the lineups have expanded and the structure and locations of the shows have changed to accommodate the crowd figures.

In 2013, the Supafest was postponed from April to November, and then ended up never happening at all without a trace.

In 2016, Paper Chase Touring was listed as deregistered on the Australian Securities & Investments Commission website.

== Tour dates and artist lineups ==
=== 2010 ===
- 13 April 2010 – Adelaide Showground, Adelaide
- 14 April 2010 – Melbourne Showgrounds, Melbourne
- 15 April 2010 – Sydney SuperDome, Sydney
- 16 April 2010 – Sydney SuperDome, Sydney
- 17 April 2010 – Brisbane Showgrounds, Brisbane
- 18 April 2010 – Perth Oval, Perth

Artist	Show				
Artist	Adelaide	Melbourne	Sydney	Brisbane	Perth
Kelly Rowland	Yes				
Pitbull	Yes				
Jay Sean	Yes				
Sean Paul	Yes				
Eve	Yes				
DJ Nino Brown	Yes				
Chris Sorbello	Yes				
Akon	Cancelled	Yes			

=== 2011 ===
- 9 April 2011 – Stadium Australia, Sydney
- 10 April 2011 – Arena Joondalup, Perth
- 16 April 2011 – Brisbane Showgrounds, Brisbane
- 17 April 2011 – Melbourne Showgrounds, Melbourne

Artist	Show			
Artist	Sydney	Perth	Brisbane	Melbourne
Snoop Dogg	Yes			
Nelly	Yes			
Taio Cruz	Yes			
Busta Rhymes	Yes			
T-Pain	Yes			
Game	Yes			
Ciara	Yes			
Keri Hilson	Yes			
Bow Wow	Yes			
Fat Joe	Yes			
New Boyz	Yes			
Benny D (Akon's DJ)	Yes			
DJ Nino Brown	Yes			
Israel Cruz	Yes			
Miracle	Yes			
Timbaland	Cancelled			

=== 2012 ===
- 14 April 2012 – Brisbane Showgrounds, Brisbane
- 15 April 2012 – Stadium Australia, Sydney
- 21 April 2012 – Melbourne Showgrounds, Melbourne
- 22 April 2012 – Arena Joondalup, Perth

Artist	Show			
Artist	Perth	Sydney	Melbourne	Brisbane
Chris Brown	Yes			
T-Pain	Yes			
Ice Cube	Yes			
Trey Songz	Yes			
Kelly Rowland	Yes			
Lupe Fiasco	Yes			
Big Sean	Yes			
Naughty by Nature	Yes			
DJ Scratch	Yes			
DJ Nino Brown	Yes			
Culture Crew	Yes			
JessLyn	Yes			
Ludacris	Yes		No	
P.Diddy	Cancelled			
Missy Elliott	Cancelled			
Rick Ross	Cancelled			

== See also ==
- List of hip hop music festivals
- Hip hop culture
