= Tank discography =

R&B recording artist discography

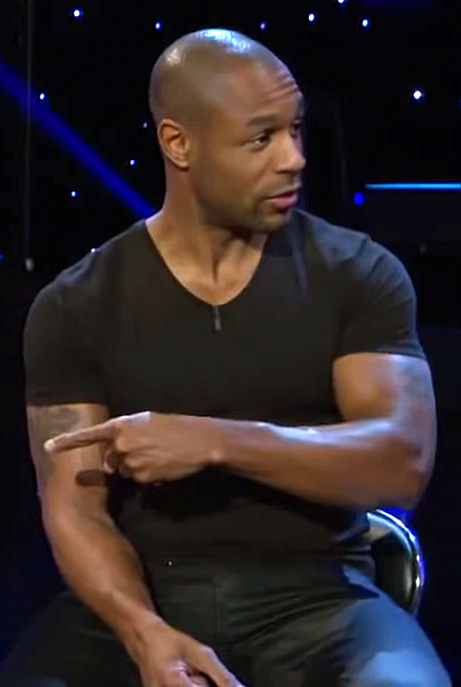
- Tank in 2014
- Studio albums: 11
- Extended plays: 1
- Singles: 44
- Mixtapes: 5

American singer Tank has released eleven studio albums, five extended play (EP), two mixtape and 44 singles. According to Billboard, Tank has sold 1.76 million albums in the U.S. as of 2013.

== Albums ==
=== Studio albums ===
List of studio albums, with selected chart positions, sales figures and certifications
Title	Album details	Peak chart positions		Certifications	Sales
Title	Album details	US	US R&B /HH	Certifications	Sales
Force of Nature	Released: March 13, 2001; Label: Blackground; Format: CD, digital download	7	1	RIAA: Gold	US: 775,000
One Man	Released: October 28, 2002; Label: Blackground, Universal; Format: CD, digital download	20	4		US: 246,000
Sex, Love & Pain	Released: May 15, 2007; Label: Blackground, Universal Motown; Format: CD, digital download	2	1		
Now or Never	Released: December 14, 2010; Label: Atlantic; Format: CD, digital download	35	10		
This Is How I Feel	Released: May 8, 2012; Label: Atlantic; Format: CD, digital download	9	1		
Stronger	Released: August 12, 2014; Label: Atlantic; Format: CD, digital download	13	1		
Sex Love & Pain II	Released: January 22, 2016; Label: R&B Money LLC, Atlantic; Format: CD, digital download	15	1		
Savage	Released: September 29, 2017; Label: R&B Money LLC, Atlantic; Format: CD, digital download	24	17		
Elevation	Released: October 25, 2019; Label: R&B Money LLC, Atlantic; Format: CD, digital download	160	—		
R&B Money	Released: August 19, 2022; Label: R&B Money LLC, Atlantic; Format: CD, digital download	—	—		
Experience	Released: September 25, 2026; Label: BMG/R&B Money; Format: Digital download, streaming	—	—		

=== Collaborative albums ===
List of collaborative albums, with selected chart positions
Title	Album details	Peak chart positions	
Title	Album details	US	US R&B /HH
Three Kings (with Ginuwine and Tyrese as TGT)	Released: August 20, 2013; Label: Atlantic; Format: CD, digital download	3	1

== Extended plays ==
Title	EP details
A Classic Christmas Night	Released: December 16, 2016; Label: R&B Money LLC; Format: Digital download
While You Wait	Released: March 27, 2020; Label: R&B Money LLC, Empire; Format: Digital download
Worth the Wait	Released: June 11, 2020; Label: R&B Money LLC, Empire; Format: Digital download

== Mixtapes ==
Title	Released
Diary of a Mad Man	November 25, 2011
If You Were Mine	February 10, 2015

== Singles ==
=== As lead artist ===
List of singles, with selected chart positions, showing year released and album name
Title	Year	Peak chart positions				Certifications	Album
Title	Year	US	US R&B /HH	US Adult R&B	US R&B Air	Certifications	Album
"Freaky" (featuring Do or Die)	2000	—	—	—	—		Non-album single
"Maybe I Deserve"	2001	38	7	5	—		Force of Nature
"Slowly"	2001	—	43	24	—		Force of Nature
"One Man"	2002	— (Note: "One Man" did not enter the US Billboard Hot 100, but peaked at number seven on the Bubbling Under Hot 100.)	25	15	—		One Man
"Let Me Live" (featuring Mannie Fresh and Jazze Pha)	2002	—	82	15	—		One Man
"I Love Them Girls"	2005	—	—	—	—		Sex, Love & Pain
"Please Don't Go"	2007	42	2	1	—		Sex, Love & Pain
"Heartbreaker"	2007	—	—	9	37		Sex, Love & Pain
"Sex Music"	2010	—	29	19	—		Now or Never
"I Can't Make You Love Me"	2010	—	—	19	64		Now or Never
"Emergency"	2010	— (Note: "Emergency" did not enter the Billboard Hot 100, but peaked at number 21 on the Bubbling Under Hot 100.)	23	4	—		Now or Never
"Celebration" (featuring Drake)	2011	—	—	30	73		Now or Never
"Compliments" (featuring Kris Stephens and T.I.)	2011	—	75	20	64		This Is How I Feel
"Next Breath"	2012	—	—	1	27		This Is How I Feel
"Sex Never Felt Better" (with Ginuwine and Tyrese as TGT)	2013	—	—	13	—		Three Kings
"Shots Fired" (featuring Chris Brown)	2013	—	—	—	—		Non-album single
"I Need" (with Ginuwine and Tyrese as TGT)	2013	—	—	5	—		Three Kings
"Next Time Around"	2014	—	—	—	—		Three Kings
"You're My Star"	2014	—	—	6	25		Stronger
"Stronger"	2014	—	—	13	40		Stronger
"You Don't Know" (featuring Wale)	2015	—	—	12	42		Sex, Love & Pain II
"#BDAY" (featuring Chris Brown, Siya and Sage the Gemini)	2016	—	—	—	—		Sex, Love & Pain II
"When We"	2017	78	35	1	5	RIAA: Platinum	Savage
"Dirty"	2019	—	—	1	20		Elevation
"I Don't Think You're Ready"	2019	—	—	3	22		Elevation
"Nasty" (with Lil Duval and Jacquees)	2020	—	—	—	—		Non-album single
"Can't Let It Show"	2021	—	—	1	10		R&B Money
"I Deserve"	2021	—	—	1	14		R&B Money
"Slow"	2022	—	—	1	17		R&B Money
"See Through Love" (featuring Chris Brown)	2023	—	—	1	12		R&B Money
"Before We Get Started" (featuring Fabolous)	2024	—	—	1	16		R&B Money
"Gone" (with Aaliyah)	2025	—	—	1	13		Non-album single
"Control"	2025	—	—	1	—		Experience
"Turtleneck"	2026	—	—	—	—		Non-album single
"Yes"	2026	—	—	1	—		Experience
"How I Need You" (with Kirk Franklin, Eric Dawkins & Zacardi Cortez)	2026	—	—	—	—		Experience
"Highlight" (with Charlie Wilson & MK)	2026	—	—	—	—		Experience

=== As featured artist ===
List of singles, with selected chart positions and certifications, showing year released and album name
Title	Year	Peak chart positions		Certifications	Album
Title	Year	US	US R&B /HH	Certifications	Album
"Tonite, I'm Yours" (Lil Zane featuring Tank)	2003	—	87		The Big Zane Theory
"She Don't Put It Down" (Joe Budden featuring Tank and Lil Wayne)	2011	96	32		No Love Lost
"Let Me In" (David Banner featuring Tank)	2012	—	—		Sex, Drugs & Video Games
"High" (Kevin McCall featuring Tank)	2013	—	—		Definition
"Love Like This (Remix)" (Olivia featuring Tank)	2013	—	—		Non-album single
"Back to Sleep (Legends Remix)" (Chris Brown featuring Tank, R. Kelly and Anthony Hamilton)	2016	—	—	RIAA: 4x Platinum	Royalty
"Work With Me / Old Girl" (DJ E-Feezy featuring Tank)	2016	—	—		The Wolf of South Beach
"If Heaven Had a Cellphone" (Bone Thugs featuring Tank)	2017	—	—		New Waves
"—" denotes a title that did not chart, or was not released in that territory.

== Guest appearances ==
List of non-single guest appearances, with other performing artists, showing year released and album name
Title	Year	Other artist(s)	Album
"Race Against Time II"	2001	Ja Rule	The Fast & The Furious
"Come Over"	2002	Aaliyah	I Care 4 U
"Good Enough"	2003	Brian McKnight, Joe, Carl Thomas, Tyrese	U-Turn
"Stronger Everyday"	2004	Jon B.	Stronger Everyday
"The Show"	2007	Kelly Rowland	Ms. Kelly
"If You Dream"	2009	Tyrese, Toni Braxton, Jordin Sparks, Omarion, Faith Evans, JoJo, Charlie Wilson, Tamar Braxton, Steve Russell	More than a Game
"Take My Time"	2009	Chris Brown	Graffiti
"On My Grind"	2010	Omarion	Ollusion
"Tonight Is The Night"	2010	—N/a	Preacher's Kid
"Take Good Care Of Your Heart"	2010	LeToya	Preacher's Kid
"Tired of Doing Me"	2010	Keyshia Cole	Calling All Hearts
"Special Occasion"	2012	Diggy Simmons	Unexpected Arrival
"Over"	2012	Willie Taylor	The Reintroduction Of Willie Taylor
"Admire"	2012	Omarion, Problem	Care Package
"See No Evil"	2012	Game, Kendrick Lamar	Jesus Piece
"High"	2013	Kevin McCall	Definition
"Let Go"	2013	Iamsu!	Kilt II
"We Aint The Same"	2013	Los, Twista	Becoming King
"Lay Your Head Back"	2013	Problem, Chris Brown, Terrace Martin	The Separation
"Pretty Gang 2"	2014	Red Cafe, Jeremih, Fabolous	In Us We Trust
"Prior to You"	2015	Tyrese	Black Rose
"Turn Down for You"	2015	Eric Bellinger, Aroc!	Cuffing Season
"Back to Sleep (Legends Remix)"	2016	Chris Brown, R. Kelly, Anthony Hamilton	—N/a
"Rock (Remix)"	2018	Plies, Jacquees, Jeremih	—N/a
"Early 2K"	2019	Chris Brown	Indigo
"Body Goals"	2026	Chris Brown	Brown

== Production discography ==
List of producer and songwriting credits (excluding guest appearances, interpolations, and samples)
Track(s)	Year	Credit	Artist(s)	Album
14. "Interlude (I'm Not Complete)"	2000	Producer (with Lil' Rick and Kevin "K-Jack" Jackson)	Dave Hollister	Chicago '85... The Movie
"Drop-Top Bentley" (featuring Dave Hollister)	2001	Producer (with Donnie Scantz)	Mowett	Non-album single
14. "Forever"	2001	Producer, backing vocals	Dave Hollister	Various artists – Music From The Motion Picture The Brothers
10. "Dun Put Up Too Long"	2002	Producer	Sharissa	No Half Steppin'
1. "Things In the Game Done Changed"	2002	Producer	Dave Hollister	Things in the Game Done Changed
8. "No Ordinary Love (Interlude)"	2002	Producer (with Dave Hollister)	Dave Hollister	Things in the Game Done Changed
9. "Love Hate Relationship"	2002	Producer	Dave Hollister	Things in the Game Done Changed
12. "I'm Wrong"	2002	Producer (with Donnie Scantz and Jamie Portee)	Dave Hollister	Things in the Game Done Changed
1. "Ain't Gon Beg You"	2004	Songwriter	Fantasia Barrino	Free Yourself
12. "This Is Me"	2004	Songwriter	Fantasia Barrino	Free Yourself
3. "O"	2004	Co-producer, additional vocals	Omarion	O
4. "I'm Tryna"	2005	Additional producer, additional vocals	Omarion	O
6. "Ya Man Ain't Me"	2005	Songwriter	Chris Brown	Chris Brown
2. "Sex with You"	2005	Co-producer	Marques Houston	Naked
5. "Naked"	2005	Songwriter	Marques Houston	Naked
4. "With You" (featuring the Game and Snoop Dogg)	2005	Producer (with Jamie Foxx)	Jamie Foxx	Unpredictable
10. "VIP"	2005	Songwriter, vocal arranger	Jamie Foxx	Unpredictable
11. "Do What It Do"	2005	Producer (with Charlie Bereal and Jamie Foxx)	Jamie Foxx	Unpredictable
15. "Wish U Were Here"	2005	Songwriter	Jamie Foxx	Unpredictable
8. "Ooh Na Na"	2006	Songwriter	Donell Jones	Journey of a Gemini
13. "Cuttin' Me Off"	2006	Co-producer (with the Underdogs)	Donell Jones	Journey of a Gemini
3. "Sideline Ho"	2006	Co-producer (with the Underdogs)	Monica	The Makings of Me
8. "My Everything"	2006	Songwriter	Monica	The Makings of Me
3. "Ghetto"; (featuring Snoop Dogg)	2007	Producer	Kelly Rowland	Ms. Kelly
7. "The Show" (featuring Tank)	2007	Producer	Kelly Rowland	Ms. Kelly
11. "I Wanna Be"	2007	Songwriter	Chris Brown	Exclusive
4 . "Under"	2009	Producer	Pleasure P	The Introduction of Marcus Cooper
6. "Gotta Have It"	2009	Producer	Pleasure P	The Introduction of Marcus Cooper
5. "Good to Me"	2009	Producer (with Jerry "Texx" Franklin)	LeToya Luckett	Lady Love
6. "Over"	2009	Producer	LeToya Luckett	Lady Love
7. "Regret"; (featuring Ludacris)	2009	Producer (with Jerry "Texx" Franklin)	LeToya Luckett	Lady Love
1. "I Get It In"; (featuring Gucci Mane)	2009	Producer (as part of Song Dynasty)	Omarion	Ollusion
12. "On My Grind"; (featuring Tank)	2010	Producer (as part of Song Dynasty)	Omarion	Ollusion
1. "My Life"	2013	Songwriter	K. Michelle	Rebellious Soul
13. "The Right One"	2013	Songwriter	K. Michelle	Rebellious Soul
12. "In Love By Now"	2015	Producer (with Catalyst, J Doe, Jamie Foxx and Travis Sayale)	Jamie Foxx	Hollywood: A Story of a Dozen Roses
13. "Jumping Out the Window"	2015	Songwriter	Jamie Foxx	Hollywood: A Story of a Dozen Roses
7. "Whatever"	2025	Songwriter	Keri Hilson	We Need to Talk: Love
7. "Tyrese"; Track 9 (Deluxe; featuring YG)	2025	Songwriter	Terrace Martin, Kenyon Dixon	Come As You Are
