= Supafriendz =

The Supafriendz was an informal collective of R&B and hip-hop artists centered around Aaliyah, active in the late 1990s and early 2000s. The group comprised Aaliyah, Tank, Missy Elliott, Ginuwine, Timbaland and Tweet. Emerging during a period of significant innovation in popular music, the Supafriends were known for their collaborative spirit and approach to production, blending elements of R&B, hip-hop, and electronic music. Timbaland’s distinctive production style, combined with the vocal talents of Aaliyah, Tank, Tweet, Ginuwine, and Missy Elliott as to which created a signature sound.

After the dissolution of Swing Mob, its former artists collaborated, with Missy Elliott, Timbaland, Magoo and Ginuwine forming the collective Supafriendz in 1996. The founding members would add a few more members to the new roster which included Nicole Wray, N.E.R.D., the Clipse, Shaunta Montgomery, Sebastian, Danja Mowf, DJ Lonnie B, Tweet, Tank and rising R&B artist Aaliyah. The collective began working with each other and collaborating on each other’s recordings, keeping the features within the group and often appearing in each other’s music videos.

The first collaboration under the Supafriendz name took place on Timbaland & Magoo’s 1997 single “Up Jumps da Boogie”, in which Missy Elliott and Ginuwine provided background vocals and made appearances in the music video. Also providing background vocals was Aaliyah, who had become affiliated with the former Swing Mob roster after Timbaland produced her 1996 album One in a Million. Missy Elliott, who had served as a writer and background vocalist on One in a Million went on to release her debut solo album, Supa Dupa Fly, in 1997. A critical and commercial success that featured production from both Missy Elliott and Timbaland, this album helped to raise the profile of the collective. While affiliated with the Supafriendz collective, Tank released the 2001 album Force of Nature. Tank also served as a songwriter for many other members of the collective contributing writing to Timbaland’s Tim’s Bio: Life from da Bassment album and Ginuwine’s songs and many of Aaliyah’s songs from this period, Tank also contributed to Aaliyah’s self titled by writing songs and being a background vocalist. Nicole Wray and Tweet also released music during the Supafriendz period of peak activity.

Aaliyah, who had become a core member of the Supafriendz due to her commercial success, passed away in 2001. This loss shook the collective, and its members gradually began to drift apart in the aftermath.

Supafriendz members

- Missy Elliott (artist, writer, producer, background vocals)
- Timbaland (producer, rapper, writer)
- Aaliyah (singer, background vocals)
- Tank (singer, writer, producer, background vocals)
- Ginuwine (singer, writer)
- Tweet (singer, writer)
- Magoo (rapper, writer)
- Chad Hugo (writer, producer, instrumentalists)
- Shaunta Montgomery (rapper, writer)
- Nicole Wray (singer, writer)
- Mad Skillz (rapper, ghostwriter)
- Pharrell (rapper, writer, singer, producer, instrumentalists)
- Danja Mowf (rapper, writer)
- Sebastian (rapper, writer)

Supafriendz collective singles

| Artist(s) | Song | Featured Artist |
|---|---|---|
| Aaliyah | One in a Million | Missy Elliott, Timbaland |
| Tank | Maybe I Deserve | Tank |
| Missy Elliott | Get Ur Freak On | Missy Elliott, Timbaland |
| Ginuwine | Pony | Ginuwine, Timbaland |
| Tweet | Oops (Oh my) | Missy Elliott |
| Aaliyah | Come Over | Tank |
| Timbaland & Magoo | All Y’all | Tweet |
| Tank | Slowly | J-Dub |
| Ginuwine | Tell Me Do U Wanna | Ginuwine, Timbaland, Jimmy Douglass, Robert Reives |
| Nicole Wray | Make It Hot | Missy Elliott |
| Aaliyah | I Care 4 U | Missy Elliott, Timbaland |
| Tank | One Man | Tank |
| Missy Elliott | Beep Me 911 | 702, Magoo |
| Tweet | Beautiful | Craig Brockman |
| Ginuwine | None of Ur Friends Business | Timbaland |
| Missy Elliott | Hot Boyz | Lil Mo |
| Aaliyah | I Can Be | Tank, Bud’da |
| Timbaland & Magoo | Up Jumps da Boogie | Aaliyah, Missy Elliott, Magoo and Timbaland |
| Ginuwine | Keep It Real | Tank, Timbaland |
| Tweet | Call Me | Missy Elliott, Timbaland |
| Missy Elliott | All N My Grill | Missy Elliott, Nicole Wray, Big Boi |
| Aaliyah | 4 Page Letter | Aaliyah |
| Ginuwine | Differences | Ginuwine, Troy Oliver |
| Tank | Kill 4 U | Tank, Keybeats |
| Missy Elliott | Work It | Missy Elliott, Timbaland |
| Nicole Wray | Bangin’ | Tank, Missy Elliott, Timbaland |
| Timbaland | Bounce | Missy Elliott |
| Aaliyah | What If | Tank, J-Dub |
| The Clipse | Grindin | N.E.R.D. |
| Tweet | Smoking Cigarettes | Tweet, Craig Brockman, Nisan Stewart |
| Ginuwine | Only When ur Lonley | Ginuwine, Timbaland, Robert Reives |
| The Clipse | Body Snatchers | N.E.R.D. |
