= This Is How I Feel =

Studio album by Tank
- Released: May 8, 2012
- Length: 39:55
- Label: Atlantic
- Producers: The Composer; Danja; Patrick Hayes; Eric Hudson; Invisible; J-Kits; Kevin McCall; Rex Rideout; T-Minus; Tank; Troy Taylor; Christopher Umana

Tank chronology
Now or Never (2010)	This Is How I Feel (2012)	Stronger (2014)

Singles from This Is How I Feel
- 1. "Compliments" Released: October 17, 2011; 2. "Next Breath" Released: January 3, 2012

This is How I Feel is the fifth studio album by American singer Tank. It was released by Atlantic Records on May 8, 2012. The album was created as a more personal and spontaneous project, with Tank focusing on expressing his emotions, life experiences, and artistic freedom rather than following a specific concept. The project allowed him to explore different sounds while remaining rooted in R&B, creating music without being limited by outside expectations. The album features contributions from producers and collaborators including Danja, Eric Hudson, Kevin McCall, T-Minus, and Troy Taylor.

The album received mixed reviews, with critics praising Tank’s vocals and polished production while criticizing its predictable themes and lack of originality. This is How I Feel debuted at number nine on the US Billboard 200 with 33,000 first-week sales and topped the Top R&B/Hip-Hop Albums chart, becoming Tank's third number-one R&B album after Force of Nature (2001) and Sex, Love & Pain (2007). The album was supported by two singles, including lead single "Compliments" featuring Kris Stephens and T.I., and follow-up "Next Breath," which topped the Adult R&B Songs chart.

== Background ==
Following the success of Now or Never (2010), Tank prepared his fifth studio album, This Is How I Feel, as a more personal and spontaneous project. In an interview with YouKnowIGotSou, Tank explained that the album was not built around a specific concept but instead focused on capturing his emotions and experiences in the moment. He described the project as an opportunity to create music without worrying about expectations, allowing him to explore different sounds while staying rooted in R&B.

== Singles ==
This Is How I Feel was preceded by two singles. The album’s lead single, "Compliments," was released on October 17, 2011, featuring Kris Stephens and a guest verse from T.I. on the album version. It peaked at number 75 on the US Billboard Hot 100 and reached number 20 on the Hot R&B/Hip-Hop Songs chart. The second single, "Next Breath," was released on January 3, 2012, and achieved greater success on R&B charts, reaching number one on the Adult R&B Songs chart and number 27 on the R&B/Hip-Hop Airplay chart, becoming his second chart topper on the adult contemporary chart.

== Critical reception ==
Professional ratings
Review scores
Source	Rating
AllMusic	3.5/5 stars
PopMatters	4/10 stars

David Jeffries of AllMusic wrote that "Long a cross between Brian McKnight and R. Kelly, R&B's smooth – but chiseled – operator Tank tips the scales toward the [Kelly] side on his 2012 release, filling the album with dreamy, lush productions and 'adults-only' lyrics that sometimes reach the level of 'shameful adults only'." PopMatters editor David Amidon found that This Is How I Feel "clocks in as Tank’s shortest project yet at just ten tracks and 40 minutes, but somehow it still manages to be something of a trial to get through [...] If you’re just an unabashed fan of male R&B vocals, or the sight of Tank’s pecs on the cover has some sort of brainwashing effect on you, This Is How I Feel might be worth a few cursory spins on Spotify or what have you, but otherwise this is a release that will come and go with very little fanfare." Writing for The Washington Post, Allison Stewart viewed the project as a technically polished but overly familiar R&B album. She praised Tank's vocal talent and ability as a ballad singer but criticized the record for lacking a unique artistic identity, relying too heavily on predictable relationship themes, and using excessive production effects.

== Commercial performance ==
This Is How I Feel debuted at number nine on the US Billboard 200 with first-week sales of 33,000 copies, becoming the second top-ten album of Tank's career. It also debuted at number one on the US Top R&B/Hip-Hop Albums chart, marking his third album to top the chart following Force of Nature (2001) and Sex, Love & Pain (2007).

== Track listing ==
This Is How I Feel – Physical edition
No.	Title	Writer(s)	Producer(s)	Length
1.	"Lonely" (featuring Chris Brown)	Durrell Babbs; Brown; Cedric Hailey; Donald DeGrate; Floyd Bentley; Lonny Bereal; James Smith; Kristina Stephens; Melvin Monroe; Vincent Watson	Invisible	4:54
2.	"Your One"	Babbs; Jerren "J-Kits" Spruill; Troy Taylor	J-Kits; Taylor	3:47
3.	"Compliments" (featuring Kris Stephens & T.I.)	Babbs; Clifford Harris; Stephens	T-Minus	4:12
4.	"Don't Give Up"	Babbs	Tank; The Composer	3:28
5.	"Nowhere" (featuring Busta Rhymes)	Babbs; Bentley; Bereal; Smith; Monroe	Tank	3:31
6.	"Off Your Hands"	Babbs; Kevin McCall	McCall	3:37
7.	"This Is How I Feel"	Babbs; Stephens; Luke Boyd; Marcella Araica; Nate Hills	Danja	4:16
8.	"Next Breath"	Babbs; Christopher Umana; McCall; Micah Powell; Sammie Bush	Tank; The Composer; Christopher "C4" Umana; Rex Rideout	3:30
9.	"Better Than Me"	Babbs; Eric Hudson	Tank; Hudson	3:53
10.	"Lost It All"	Babbs; Patrick Hayes; Taylor	Hayes; Taylor	4:42

This Is How I Feel – Digital edition
No.	Title	Writer(s)	Producer(s)	Length
1.	"How I Feel (Intro)"	Babbs	Tank	2:10
2.	"Lonely" (featuring Chris Brown)	Babbs; Brown; Hailey; DeGrate; Bentley; Bereal; Smith; Stephens; Monroe; Watson	Invisible	4:54
3.	"Your One"	Babbs; Spruill; Taylor	J-Kits; Taylor	3:47
4.	"Compliments (Interlude)"	Babbs	Tank	1:27
5.	"Compliments" (featuring Kris Stephens & T.I.)	Babbs; Harris; Stephens	T-Minus	4:12
6.	"Don't Give Up"	Babbs	Tank; The Composer	3:28
7.	"Nowhere" (featuring Busta Rhymes)	Babbs; Bentley; Bereal; Smith; Monroe	Tank	3:31
8.	"Off Your Hands"	Babbs; McCall	McCall	3:37
9.	"This Is How I Feel (Interlude)"	Babbs	Tank	2:03
10.	"This Is How I Feel"	Babbs; Stephens; Boyd; Araica; Hills	Danja	4:16
11.	"Next Breath"	Babbs; Umana; McCall; Powell; Bush	Tank; The Composer; Umana; Rideout	3:30
12.	"Better Than Me"	Babbs; Hudson	Tank; Hudson	3:53
13.	"Lost It All"	Babbs; Hayes; Taylor	Hayes; Taylor	4:42

iTunes Store deluxe version
No.	Title	Writer(s)	Producer(s)	Length
14.	"Underrated"	Babbs; Curtis Jackson; Andre Young; Michael Elizondo	Tank	3:56
15.	"Crazy" (featuring Kevin McCall)	Babbs; McCall	McCall	3:39
16.	"Underrated" (music video)			4:02

Samples

- "Lonely" contains elements of "My Heart Belongs to You" as performed by Jodeci.

== Personnel ==
Credits for This Is How I Feel adapted from Allmusic.

* Rebecca Alexis – stylist
- Marcella Araica – composer
- Marcella "Ms. Lago" Araica – engineer, mixing
- John Armstrong – engineer
- Durrell Babbs – composer, executive producer, producer
- Paul Bailey – engineer
- Aaron Bay–Schuck – A&R
- Floyd E. Bentley III Composer
- Britney Bereal – vocals (Background)
- Charlie Bereal – guitar
- Lonny Bereal – composer
- Josh Berg – engineer
- Luke Boyd – composer, vocals (Background)
- Chris Brown – composer, Featured Artist
- Sammie Bush – composer, vocals (Background)
- Clifford Harris – composer
- The Composer – producer
- Danja – producer
- Donald DeGrate – composer
- Dustin Douglass – engineer
- Lanre Gaba – A&R
- Doug Geikie – engineer
- Jimmy Gonzales – engineer
- Cedric Hailey – composer
- Trehy Harris – Assistant
- Nico Hartikainen – engineer
- Patrick "Guitarboy" Hayes Composer, Producer
- Nate Hills – composer
- Eric Hudson – composer, producer
- Jaycen Joshua – mixing
- David Kutch – Mastering
- Christian Lantry – Photography
- William Marshall – Hair Stylist, Make–Up
- Kevin McCall – composer, producer, vocals (Background)
- Peter Mokran – mixing
- Melvin R. Monroe III Composer
- Mark Obriski – Art Direction, Design
- Rhea Pasricha – A&R
- Micah Powell – composer, vocals (Background)
- Erik Reichers – engineer
- Rex Rideout – additional production
- Poet Ed Sanders – Assistant
- Phil Scott III – engineer
- James "J–Doe" Smith – composer
- Jerren Spruill – composer
- Jerren "J–Kits" Spruill – producer
- Marsha St. Hubert – Marketing
- Kris Stephens – Featured Artist
- Kristina Stephens – composer
- T.I. – Featured Artist
- Tank – Primary Artist, Producer
- Troy Taylor – composer, producer
- T–Minus – producer
- Alex Heme Toval – engineer
- Carolyn Tracey – Package Production
- Sergio "Sergical" Tsai – engineer
- Christopher Umana – composer, producer
- Vincent Watson – composer
- Vincent "Invincible" Watson – producer

== Charts ==
=== Weekly charts ===
Weekly chart performance for This Is How I Feel
Chart (2012)	Peak position
US Billboard 200	9
US Billboard Top R&B/Hip-Hop Albums	1

=== Year-end charts ===
Year-end chart performance for This Is How I Feel
Chart (2012)	Position
US Top R&B/Hip-Hop Albums (Billboard)	63

== Release history ==
This Is How I Feel release history
Region	Date	Format	Label	Ref(s)
Various	May 8, 2012	CD; Digital download; Streaming	Atlantic	
