= Control (Tank song) =

Single by Tank
- Released: November 18, 2025
- Genre: R&B
- Length: 3:43
- Label: R&B Money/BMG
- Songwriters: Tank; Travis Bruce; Lonny Bereal; Andre Robertson; Abishek Prakash; Nathaniel Hill Kim; Leoren Davis Jr.; Dylan Maurice Hyde; Jimmy Jam and Terry Lewis; Janet Jackson
- Producers: Bizness Boi; Abi; Crater; Oh Gosh Leotus; Dylan Hyde

Tank singles chronology
"Gone" (2025)	"Control" (2025)

"Control" is a song by American singer Tank. It was written by Tank along with Travis Bruce, Lonny Bereal, Andre Robertson, Abishek Prakash, and Nathaniel Hill Kim, Leoren Davis Jr., and Dylan Hyde for Tank's upcoming album "Experience" (2026), while production was helmed by Bizness Boi, Abi CRATER, Oh Gosh Leotus, and Dylan Hyde. It was released by R&B Money/BMG as the album's lead single on November 18, 2025, and peaked at number one on the US Adult R&B Airplay chart.

== Composition ==
On the silken ballad, which interpolates Janet Jackson's 1986 classic of the same name, Tank takes command in the bedroom to deliver a pleasurable experience to his lover. "Control / I know all of your spots, I'm in / Control / Take this ride, lose your mind when I'm inside," he sings on the chorus.

Speaking on his new single, Tank exclusively told Rated R&B, "'Control' is about control. Who really has it? The woman or man. Janet was fighting for control then and we are still fighting for control now. This song is your opportunity to seize Control."

== Music video ==
The video premiered on YouTube on December 17, 2025. It was directed by Daniil Demichev

== Track listing ==
Digital download

- "Control" – 2:45

== Credits and personnel ==
- Durrell "Tank" Babbs – writer
- Travis Bruce – writer
- Lonny Bereal – writer
- Andre Robertson – writer
- Abikesh Prakash – writer
- Leoren Davis Jr. – writer
- Nathaniel Hill Kim – writer
- James Harris III - writer
- Terry Lewis - writer
- Bizness Boi - producer
- Crater - producer
- Abi - producer
- Oh Gosh Leotus - producer
- Dylan Hyde – producer
- Jaycen Joshua – sound engineer/mixer
- BLANK – mastering assistant

== Charts ==
Chart performance for "Control"
Chart (2026)	Peak position
US Adult R&B Airplay (Billboard)	1

== Release history ==
Release history and formats for "Control"
Region	Date	Format(s)	Label	Ref.
United States	November 18, 2025	Streaming		
