= Elevation (Tank album) =

Studio album by Tank
- Released: October 25, 2019
- Genre: R&B
- Length: 48:00
- Labels: Atlantic; R&B Money

Tank chronology
Savage (2017)	Elevation (2019)	R&B Money (2022)

Singles from Elevation
- 1. "Dirty" Released: January 11, 2019; 2. "I Don't Think You're Ready" Released: July 25, 2019

Elevation is the ninth studio album by American R&B singer-songwriter Tank. It was released on October 25, 2019 via Atlantic Records and R&B Money

== Background ==
Released via R&B Money/Atlantic Records, Elevation stands out as a star-studded affair with appearances by Keith Sweat, JoJo, Luke James, Candice Boyd, Shawn Stockman, and Omari Hardwick, who is featured on two songs. Elevation follows behind two singles “Dirty” and “I Don’t Think You’re Ready,” which both have fared well on the urban adult contemporary radio chart.

“Even with all of the greatness that we’ve achieved, we can go further,” he told Billboard. “We can go higher. We can elevate. We wanted to use this album to prove that — push ourselves in terms of sound, imagery.”

== Singles ==
The album's first single, "Dirty", was released on January 11, 2019. It debuted at number one on Billboard's Adult R&B Songs chart. The video for "Dirty" premiered on YouTube on January 14, 2019. The second single, "I Don't Think You're Ready," was released on July 25, 2019.

== Chart performance ==
The album debuted at number 160 on the US Billboard 200 chart, with first-week sales of 1,800 copies.

== Track listing ==
Elevation track listing
No.	Title	Writer(s)	Producer(s)	Length
1.	"Overture (with Omari Harwick)"	Omari Hardwick		3:52
2.	"Elevation" (featuring Carvena Jones)	Tank; Carvena Jones; Lonny Bereal	Doh Boy	2:21
3.	"WWJD"	Tank; Varren Wade; Devell Moore; Ryan Toby; Shirley Murdock; Larry Troutman; Roger Troutman	Harmony Samuels	3:47
4.	"Champion"	Tank; Problem; Dwight Richardson	Doh Boy	3:42
5.	"No Cap" (featuring Dante, Dontay, Duntea)	Tank; Duntea Davis; J. Valentine	Bryant Troy	3:15
6.	"I Don't Think You're Ready"	Tank; Micah Powell; J. Valentine; Frank "Nitty Brims"; Jordan Pegee; Frederik Schariff	IDK	2:43
7.	"Dirty"	Tank; J. Valentine; Carl McCormick	Cardiak	3:44
8.	"Somebody Else" (featuring JoJo)	Tank; Clifford Harris; Shawn Carter; Kenneth Gamble; Thomas Bell; Roland Chambers; Kasseem Dean; Nicholas Humes	The Co-Captains	3:19
9.	"Do You" (featuring Keith Sweat and Candice Boyd)	Tank; Feather	Tank	3:49
10.	"I Promise"	Tank; Frank "Nitty" Brims; Micah Powell; Dwight Richardson	Doh Boy	3:40
11.	"You Mean More" (featuring Luke James and Major)	Tank; Jovan J. Dawkins; Jevon Hill; Stanley Green Jr.	The Co-Captains	3:35
12.	"This" (featuring Shawn Stockman and Omari Hardwick)	Tank; Omari Hardwick; La'Chaz Holloway	La'Chaz Holloway	4:32
13.	"Our Song"	Tank; Zena Foster	Tank; Zena Foster	3:28
14.	"Dirty (Remix)" (featuring Chris Brown, Feather, Rahky)	Tank; Chris Brown; J.Valentine; Rahky; Keith Sweat; Eric McCaine; Christian Ward; Samuel David Jimenez; Joshua Parker; Paul Cabbin; Terence Williams	Hitmaka; OG Parker; Paul Cabbin; Smash David	2:58

Sample credits

- "WWJD" contains an interpolation of "What About Us" as performed by Jodeci.
- "Somebody Else" contains an interpolation of "Bring Em Out" as performed by T.I..
- "Dirty (Remix)" contains an interpolation of "Twisted" as performed by Keith Sweat.

== Charts ==
Weekly chart performance for Elevation
Chart (2019)	Peak position
US Billboard 200	160
US Top R&B Albums (Billboard)	19

== Release history ==
Elevation release history
Region	Date	Format	Label
United States	October 25, 2019	CD; digital download	Atlantic Records
