= Three Kings (TGT album) =

Studio album by TGT
- Released: August 20, 2013
- Recorded: Mason Sound (North Hollywood, California); Voltron Recordz "Love Room" (Los Angeles, California); Platinum Sound (New York City, New York)
- Length: 63:32
- Label: Atlantic
- Producer: Fabbien Nahounou; Brandon "B.A.M." Alexander; Tank; Tim & Bob; The Underdogs; Dominique Logan; Darius Logan; B. Edwards, Jr.; Marcus Hodge; Carvin & Ivan

Singles from Three Kings
- 1. "Sex Never Felt Better" Released: February 14, 2013; 2. "I Need" Released: July 2, 2013; 3. "Next Time Around" Released: 2014

Three Kings is the only studio album by R&B supergroup TGT. It was released on August 20, 2013 on Atlantic Records.

== Critical reception ==
Professional ratings
Review scores
| Source | Rating |
|---|---|
| AllMusic | 3/5 stars |
| Independent Online | 2/5 stars |
| PopMatters | 6/10 |

AllMusic editor Andy Kellman called Three Kings an "hourlong affair that doesn't deviate much from any of the men's recent solo work [...] It's heavy on slow jams and ballads, drawing from elder leaders of the form, such as the Isley Brothers, Roger Troutman, and R. Kelly. Some of the songs are as strong as anything from the members' 2010s solo work, but not much truly stands out." Brent Faulkner from PopMatters called Three Kings a "good and enjoyable R&B album. "Great" might be a stretch given the exhaustive length and overplay on sex and the profane, but there are plenty of pros about this effort. The biggest triumph is how well Tyrese, Ginuwine, and Tank blend vocally. Even when the material could use a boost, TGT impress vocally." Independent Online's Munya Vomo found that the album "was worth the wait [...] The album has a number of baby-making songs which comes as no surprise since the singers’ individual projects were about that too."

== Commercial performance ==
Three Kings debuted at number three on the us Billboard 200 chart, with first-week sales of 76,000 copies in the United States. The album also opened at number one on the US Top R&B/Hip-Hop Albums chart, becoming Tank's fourth, Ginuwine's third and Tyrese first album to do so.

== Track listing ==
Three Kings track listing
| No. | Title | Writer(s) | Producer(s) | Length |
|---|---|---|---|---|
| 1. | "Take It Wrong" | Darius Logan; Dominique Logan; Tyrese Gibson | Fabbien Nahounou | 4:23 |
| 2. | "No Fun" (featuring Problem) | Brandon "B.A.M." Hodge; Harvey Mason, Jr.; Damon Thomas; Jason Martin; Johnnie Newt; Calvin Broadus; Ricardo Brown; Nathaniel Hale; Warren Griffin III; Andre Young | The Underdogs; B.A.M.^{[a]} | 4:00 |
| 3. | "Sex Never Felt Better" | Hodge; Gibson; Durrell Babbs; Lonny Bereal; James "J Doe" Smith | B.A.M.; Gibson^{[a]} | 4:13 |
| 4. | "I Need" | Hodge; Babbs; Elgin Lumpkin; Bereal; Smith; Mason; Thomas | B.A.M.; Gibson^{[a]} | 4:35 |
| 5. | "Next Time Around" | Babbs | Tank | 3:47 |
| 6. | "Interlude" | Gibson | Tim & Bob | 1:00 |
| 7. | "Hurry" | Steve Jordan; Tim Kelley; Bob Robinson; Asaleana Elliott; Michael Harris; Kenyon Dixon; Aaron Sledge | Tim & Bob | 3:19 |
| 8. | "Weekend Love" | Mason; Thomas; Andrew Hey | The Underdogs | 3:56 |
| 9. | "Lessons In Love" | Babbs; Lumpkin; Patrick "J. Que" Smith; Robert Newt; Don City; Thomas; Dominique Logan; Darius Logan | Thomas; Dominique Logan; Darius Logan | 3:53 |
| 10. | "Interlude" | Gibson | Focus... | 1:05 |
| 11. | "Explode" | Hodge; Babbs; Eric Dawkins; Newt; Mason; Thomas; Luther Campbell; Harry Wayne Casey; Richard Finch | B.A.M. | 3:52 |
| 12. | "FYH" | Hodge; Kenyon Dixon; Pollard | B.A.M. | 4:09 |
| 13. | "OMG" | Babbs; Marcus "Whit" James; Devin L. Resnover | B.A.M. | 3:57 |
| 14. | "Running Back" | Hodge; Babbs; Lumpkin; Gibson | B.A.M. | 4:44 |
| 15. | "Burn Out" | Kristal "Tytewriter" Oliver; Kristofer Murray; Ivan Barias; Javad Day | Carvin & Ivan; Day | 3:41 |
| 16. | "Tearing It Down" | Babbs; Lumpkin; Gibson | Tank | 4:23 |
| 17. | "Our House" | Mason; Thomas | The Underdogs | 4:34 |
| Total length: | | | | 63:32 |

Target edition bonus tracks
| No. | Title | Writer(s) | Producer(s) | Length |
|---|---|---|---|---|
| 18. | "All for You" | Adonis Shropshire; Mason; Thomas | The Underdogs | 3:21 |
| 19. | "Between the Lines" | Babbs; Mason; Thomas; Mike Daley; Dewain Whitmore Jr.; Brittany Burton | The Underdogs; Daley^{[a]} | 3:42 |
| Total length: | | | | 66:74 |

Notes

- ^{^[a]} denotes co-producer(s)

Sample credits

- "No Fun" contains a sample of "Ain't No Fun (If the Homies Can't Have None)", as performed by Snoop Dogg.
- "Explode" contains a sample of "I Wanna Rock", as performed by Luke.

== Personnel ==
Credits adapted from Allmusic.

- Andrew Hey – guitars, recording engineer
- Agape Jerry – guitars
- Javad Day – keyboards
- Mansur Zafr – drum programming
- Ivan "Orthodox" Barias – drum programming
- Michael "Mike Jay" Jimenez – background vocals
- Harvey Mason, Jr. – keyboards, vocal production, mixing
- David Boyd – assistant engineer
- Michael Daley – drum programming, assistant engineer
- Richard Furch – recording engineer, mixing, editing
- Tyrese Gibson – primary artist, mixing, executive producer
- Ginuwine – primary artist, executive producer
- Tank – primary artist, producer, executive producer
- Trina Bowman – production coordinator
- Dave Kutch – mastering
- Marc Baptiste – photography
- Mark Obriski – art direction, design
- Mitchell "M.O." Owens – additional production

== Charts ==
=== Weekly charts ===
Weekly chart performance for Three Kings
| Chart (2013) | Peak position |
|---|---|
| Dutch Albums (Album Top 100) | 96 |
| Korean International Albums (Gaon) | 76 |
| UK Albums (OCC) | 95 |
| UK R&B Albums (OCC) | 9 |
| US Billboard 200 | 3 |
| US Top R&B/Hip-Hop Albums (Billboard) | 1 |

=== Year-end charts ===
2013 year-end chart performance for Three Kings
| Chart (2013) | Position |
|---|---|
| US Billboard 200 | 143 |
| US Top R&B/Hip-Hop Albums (Billboard) | 33 |

2014 year-end chart performance for Three Kings
| Chart (2014) | Position |
|---|---|
| US Top R&B/Hip-Hop Albums (Billboard) | 54 |

== Release history ==
Three Kings release history
| Region | Date | Format(s) | Label | Ref. |
|---|---|---|---|---|
| United States | August 20, 2013 | CD; digital download | Atlantic | |
