= Sex Music (song) =

Single by Tank

from the album Now or Never
- Released: June 29, 2010
- Length: 3:43
- Label: Atlantic
- Songwriter(s): Durrell "Tank" Babbs; Jerry "Texx" Franklin; Harvey Mason, Jr.; Robert Newt; Kristina Stephens; J. Valentine
- Producer(s): Song Dynasty; Harvey Mason, Jr.

Tank singles chronology
"Heartbreaker" (2007)	"Sex Music" (2010)	"Emergency" (2010)

"Sex Music" is a song by American singer Tank. It was written by Tank along with Robert Newt, Jerry "Texx" Franklin, Harvey Mason, Jr., Kristina Stephens, and J. Valentine for his fourth album Now or Never (2010), while production was helmed by Mason and Song Dynasty. It was released by Atlantic Records as the album's lead single on June 29, 2010 and peaked number 29 on the US Billboard Hot R&B/Hip-Hop Songs chart.

== Music video ==
The video premiered on Vibe.com on August 5, 2010. It was directed by Colin Tilley.

== Track listing ==
Digital download

- "Sex Music" – 3:43

== Credits and personnel ==
Credits lifted from the liner notes of Now or Never.

- Durrell "Tank" Babbs – writer
- David Boyd – recording assistant
- Danny Cheung – recording engineer
- Michael Daley – recording assistant
- Jerry "Texx" Franklin – writer
- Jesus Garnica – mixing assistant
- Dabling Harward – recording assistant
- Andrew Hey – recording engineer
- Jaycen Joshua – mixing engineer
- Harvey Mason, Jr. – producer, writer
- Robert Newt – writer
- Song Dynasty – producer
- Kristina Stephens – writer
- J. Valentine – writer

== Charts ==
Chart performance for "Sex Music"
Chart (2010)	Peak position
US Hot R&B/Hip-Hop Songs (Billboard)	29

== Release history ==
Release history and formats for "Sex Music"
Region	Date	Format(s)	Label	Ref.
United States	June 29, 2010	Digital download	Atlantic	
