= Stronger (Tank album) =

Studio album by Tank
- Released: August 12, 2014
- Recorded: 2013–2014
- Genre: R&B
- Length: 52:35
- Label: Atlantic
- Producers: Tank, Don City, Derrick D. Beck, Jerry "Wonder" Duplessis, Shama "Sak Pase" Joseph, James "J-Doe" Smith, Eric "Bluetooth" Griggs, Young Fyre, Infinity, Da Internz

Tank chronology
This Is How I Feel (2012)	Stronger (2014)	Sex Love & Pain II (2016)

Singles from Stronger
- 1. "You're My Star" Released: March 11, 2014

Stronger is the sixth studio album by American R&B recording artist Tank. The album was released on August 12, 2014, by Atlantic Records. The album was supported by the single "You're My Star". The album debuted at number 13 on the Billboard 200 chart, selling 16,621 copies in its first week of release.

== Background ==
In June 2014, in an interview with Ebony, Tank explained the album title, saying: "Musically, it leans to my strengths as a musician; as a singer; as a songwriter; as the entertainer I’ve always wanted to be. This album is freedom to me. I’m not compromising being talented, [and] I’m not apologizing for the gifts God has given me. On the flip side, from a spiritual and mental standpoint I’ve had to go through a lot in the last few years to get to a space where I am this happy or this excited about my life and where it’s going."

He also spoke about the song "Hope This Makes You Love Me", saying: "I have a record on this album that’s extremely special. It’s called “I Hope This Makes You Love Me.” This record just speaks to the idea of how we try to barter for love. How we, in a sense, try to pay for it—like to love a person and to not get [love] in return, or the same love in return and how far we’re willing to go to have that love reciprocated the way we want it to be. It's like we do anything for it, and at the end of the day, it's just in hope of being loved in return. This song is an experience."

In August 2014, in an interview with Vibe, he spoke about what he did differently on the album, saying: "I added a lot more of the original retro sound of R&B to this album, all the way through and through. I really wanted to pay homage to that sound and what I do as a musician, as a true vocalist, as a songwriter and really let people experience that side of me 100 percent. Coming off the TGT album, I saw that there was still a need for real R&B music, and nobody’s really throwing that out there. This album is leaning towards my strengths and what I do well." He also spoke about why the album doesn't have any features, saying: "I’m not really a feature-heavy guy anyway. When I have a vision, I like to see it all the way through, you know? Sometimes I feel like if a feature is going to interrupt that vision and it's not going to really speak to the song the way I need it to, then I’d rather just be without it. I don’t do features just to do features that put hot people on one song. That’s a way of doing things, but it's not my way."

== Singles ==
On March 11, 2014, the album's first single, "You're My Star" was released. On June 10, 2014, the music video was released for "You're My Star". He spoke about the song, saying: "The song wasn’t written for anybody in particular, it was just [written] for all women period. I get so irritated with women being called b*tches and hoes on songs, and those songs climbing to number one—you know, those songs just being the barometer by which all records are measured. [It’s] disappointing that my record doesn’t have this disrespectful shock value that [makes] you [not] want to play it on your big station. You need something degrading and defiling to gain listeners. We gotta change that. For all the records that are calling [women] out of [their] name, this record is going to mention who you really are: you’re a star, [and] you’re appreciated."

== Critical response ==
Professional ratings
Review scores
Source	Rating
AllMusic	2.5/5 stars
Rated R&B	3.5/5 stars
Soul in Stereo	3/5 stars

Michael Howard from Rated R&B rated Stronger three and a half out of five stars and praised the album as "a nice return for the veteran singer," noting that Tank "didn't play it safe" and applauding his willingness to experiment with a more modern sound despite some weaker lyrics. Writing for SoulTracks, L. Michael Gipson praised the album as "easily one of his best in years," calling it a "grown man's anthem album" that blends traditional R&B with modern influences. He highlighted the album's commercial and artistic success, concluding that it "firmly illustrate[s] why it's Tank who's the real star." Edward Bowser of Soul in Stereo awarded Stronger three out of five stars, commending Tank for evolving beyond his signature ballads and experimenting with new sounds. While he felt the album's stylistic shift was uneven, Bowser praised the title track as "powerful, energetic and emotional," concluding that Tank's willingness to take creative risks was a positive step in his artistic evolution.

Andy Kellman of AllMusic observed that Tank was enjoying a successful period in his career following the top ten success of This Is How I Feel and TGT's Three Kings. While he considered Stronger an "adequate and sometimes brow-raising" effort, Kellman argued that the album's title reflected Tank's career resilience more than its content, citing several of its more desperate lyrical themes. Jonathan Landrum Jr. of the Associated Press described Stronger as an uneven effort, criticizing several of its upbeat tracks while praising its stronger second half. He highlighted title track "Stronger" as a standout, writing that the title track "sav[es] Tank's album from being a total disappointment."

== Commercial performance ==
The album debuted at number 13 on the Billboard 200, with first-week sales of 16,621 copies in the United States. In its second week, the album sold 6,151 more copies bringing its total album sales to 22,772.

== Controversy ==
Due to the album's low sales, Atlantic stopped all promotion for the album- including the release of what would have been the second single "Stronger". As a result, Tank went to Instagram in December 2014 to rant about his displeasure of the album's failure by blaming it on the fans. His rant included the statement “Maybe I should have been born white then all my music would go straight to mainstream" - referencing Sam Smith and Adele's success on urban radio. Tank also criticized the music industry, the lack of musicianship and whether he should continue doing rhythm and blues. He later concluded his rant by ending with the following statement:

What I do know is that i will not continue to be faithful to something or someone that is not being faithful to me. I love you but I have a family. I have a mom and dad just like you. I have goals and dreams just like you. I refuse to work hard for nothing. I look better, sing better, produce better, write better, and perform better than dam near everybody and this is the thanks I get?.. Again I’m not angry I’m just tired.. Please enjoy my last real R&B album “Stronger” cause you’ll never get another one!

== Track listing ==
Stronger track listing
No.	Title	Writer(s)	Producer(s)	Length
1.	"You're My Star"	Durrell "Tank" Babbs; Joseph "Lonny" Bereal; Donameche Jackson; Bobby Newt	Tank	5:04
2.	"Nobody Better"	Babbs; Derrick D. Beck; Bereal; Jackson; James "J-Doe" Smith	Don City; Beck	4:20
3.	"Dance With Me"	Arden Altino; Babbs; Olivier Castelli; Jerry "Wonda" Duplessis	Duplessis	6:20
4.	"I Gotta Have It"	Altino; Babbs; Duplessis	Duplessis	3:06
5.	"Missing You"	Altino; Babbs; Duplessis; Scott "Kasper" Gaddy	Duplessis	5:30
6.	"Same Way"	Babbs; Bereal; Eric "Bluetooth" Griggs; Smith	Griggs; Smith	5:16
7.	"Hope This Makes You Love Me"	Babbs; Bereal; Tramaine Winfrey; Smith	Young Fyre	5:41
8.	"Stronger"	Babbs; Antario Holmes; Chris "CJ" Jackson; Smith; Jordan Suecof	Infinity	5:31
9.	"Thanking You"	Altino; Babbs; Duplessis; Shama Joseph	Duplessis; Shama "Sak Pase" Joseph	6:11
10.	"If That's What It Takes"	Babbs; Ernest Clark; Uforo Ebong; Marcos Palacios; Kevin Randolph; Tony Russell	Da Internz	5:37

Target bonus tracks
No.	Title	Writer(s)	Producer(s)	Length
11.	"Incredible"	Babbs; Newt	Tank	3:59
12.	"Without You"	Babbs; Idhiambo	Odhi Beats	4:11

== Charts ==
=== Weekly charts ===
Weekly chart performance for Stronger
Chart (2014)	Peak position
US Billboard 200	13
US Top R&B/Hip-Hop Albums (Billboard)	1

=== Year-end charts ===
Year-end chart performance for Stronger
Chart (2014)	Position
US Top R&B/Hip-Hop Albums (Billboard)	71
