= Kris Stephens =

American singer and songwriter (born 1987)

- Born: Kristina Marie Stephens; January 21, 1987 (age 39); Temple Hills, Maryland, U.S.
- Genres: R&B, pop
- Occupation: Singer-songwriter
- Years active: 2009–present
- Labels: Primary Wave, RoccAge, Grand Hustle Records

Kristina Marie Stephens (born January 21, 1987) is an American singer and songwriter. She is best known for her guest performance alongside Kendrick Lamar and B.o.B on rapper T.I.'s 2013 single "Memories Back Then", which entered the Billboard Hot 100. Shortly after, she signed with T.I.'s record label, Grand Hustle Records, an imprint of Epic Records to begin work on her debut studio album for the label, which remains unreleased. Prior to this, she was credited with songwriting work for American singer Tank on his albums Now or Never (2010) and This Is How I Feel (2012).

== Life and career ==
Stephens began writing poetry when she was nine, singing solos in church and school. She attended Towson University, where she studied business management until she realized she'd been writing songs in class instead of paying attention, leading her to drop out so she could focus on music.

Stephens moved to Atlanta and joined a girl group, and although her time with the group was limited, R&B singer Tank took notice and the two formed a long-term writing partnership and eventually moved in together for a brief period of time. Tank featured her on his song "Compliments" along with rapper T.I., and on set for the music video, Stephens built a rapport with T.I.; he heard her music and decided to go into business with Tank on her behalf.

In 2013, Stephens was featured on T.I.'s single "Memories Back Then", which also featured B.o.B and Kendrick Lamar, as well as "Chasing Me," alongside Iggy Azalea and Young Dro. That same year, she released a cover of Aaliyah's "One in a Million" and signed a major publishing deal with Primary Wave Music through super producer RoccStar.

== Discography ==
=== As a featured artist ===
| Year | Artist | Title | Label |
|---|---|---|---|
| 2013 | T.I. and Hustle Gang feat. Iggy Azalea, Kris Stephens and Young Dro | "Chasing Me" | Grand Hustle Records |
| 2013 | Hustle Gang feat. B.o.B, Kendrick Lamar and Kris Stephens | "Memories Back Then" | MTC Records |
| 2012 | Tank feat. T.I. and Kris Stephens | "Compliments" | Atlantic Records |

=== Songwriting discography ===
| Year | Artist | Title | Label |
|---|---|---|---|
| 2015 | Prince Royce | "With You" | RCA Records |
| 2014 | J.Lo feat. T.I. | "A.K.A." | Capitol Records |
| 2014 | J.Lo feat. Iggy Azalea | "Acting Like That" | Capitol Records |
| 2014 | J.Lo | "So Good" | Capitol Records |
| 2014 | J.Lo | "Charades" | Capitol Records |
| 2012 | Pitbull feat. Shakira | "Get It Started" | Bad Boy Entertainment |
| 2012 | Tank feat. Chris Brown | "Lonely" | Atlantic Records |
| 2010 | Keyshia Cole | "Tired of Doin Me" | Geffen Records |
| 2010 | Ron Isley | "Supposed to Do" | Island/Def Jam |
| 2010 | Ginuwine | "Heaven" | Notifi Music |
| 2010 | Tank | "Celebration" | Atlantic Records |
| 2010 | Tank | "You Mean That Much" | Atlantic Records |
| 2010 | Tank | "Let Me Know" | Atlantic Records |
| 2010 | Tank | "Sex Music" | Atlantic Records |
| 2010 | Tank | "On My Way" | Atlantic Records |
| 2009 | Tank feat. Tyrese, Toni Braxton, Jordin Sparks, Omarion, Faith Evans, JoJo, Charlie Wilson, Tamar Braxton & Steve Russell | "If You Dream" (More than a Game soundtrack) | |
| 2009 | Day 26 | "Girlfriend" | Bad Boy Entertainment |
| 2009 | LeToya | "Over" | Capitol Records |
| 2009 | LeToya | "Regret" | Capitol Records |
| 2009 | LeToya | "Good to Me" | Capitol Records |
| 2009 | Pleasure P | "Under" | Atlantic Records |
