= Savage (Tank album) =

Studio album by Tank
- Released: September 29, 2017
- Genres: R&B; trap
- Length: 42:23
- Labels: R&B Money; Atlantic

Tank chronology
Sex Love & Pain II (2016)	Savage (2017)	Elevation (2019)

Singles from Savage
- 1. "When We" Released: June 16, 2017

Savage is the eighth studio album by American R&B singer-songwriter Tank. It was released on September 29, 2017, by Atlantic Records and his synergetic label R&B Money. The album debuted and peaked at number 24 on US Billboard 200 and at number 17 on Billboard's Top R&B/Hip-Hop Albums. The album's leading single "When We" became his first US Billboard Hot 100 entry as a solo artist in over a decade and peaked at number one on the Adult R&B Songs chart.

== Critical reception ==
Professional ratings
Review scores
Source	Rating
AllMusic	2.5/5 stars

Andy Kellman of AllMusic rated Savage two and a half out of five stars. He wrote that "this isn't quite as jarring as hearing a new jack swing album by an artist who debuted in the early '70s — Babbs is genuinely plugged into the material with a voice at full, commanding power — but the quality of the material is ultimately unexceptional."

== Track listing ==
Savage track listing
No.	Title	Writer(s)	Producer(s)	Length
1.	"Savage"	Durrell "Tank" Babbs; Jovan J. Dawkins; Stanley Green Jr.; Jevon Hill; Jean Gardy Semexant	Stanley Green Jr.; Jevon Hill; Jovan J. Dawkins; Bangerz	2:59
2.	"Everything" (featuring Trey Songz & Ludacris)			4:04
3.	"Do for Me"			3:55
4.	"Only One"			2:57
5.	"You Belong to Me"			3:29
6.	"Good Thing" (featuring Candice Boyd)			3:36
7.	"Sexy"			4:32
8.	"When We"			5:09
9.	"F It Up"			4:23
10.	"Nothing On"			5:20
11.	"Stay Where You Are" (featuring J. Valentine)			3:34

== Charts ==
Chart performance for Savage
Chart (2017)	Peak position
US Billboard 200	24
US Top R&B/Hip-Hop Albums (Billboard)	17

== Release history ==
Savage release history
Region	Date	Format	Label	Ref(s)
Various	September 29, 2017	CD; Digital download; Streaming	R&B Money; Atlantic	
