= Emergency (Tank song) =

Single by Tank

from the album Now or Never
- Released: October 5, 2010
- Length: 4:14
- Label: Atlantic
- Songwriters: Robert Newt; Durrell "Tank" Babbs; J. Valentine; Jerry "Texx" Franklin
- Producer: Song Dynasty

Tank singles chronology
"Sex Music" (2010)	"Emergency" (2010)	"Compliments" (2011)

"Emergency" is a song by R&B singer Tank. It was written by Tank along with Robert Newt, J. Valentine, and Jerry "Texx" Franklin for his fourth album, Now or Never (2010), while production was helmed by duo Song Dynasty. The song was released as the album's second single and reached number four on the US Adult R&B Songs and number 23 on the Hot R&B/Hip-Hop Songs chart.

== Track listing ==
Digital download

- "Emergency" – 4:13

== Credits and personnel ==
Credits lifted from the liner notes of Now or Never.

- Durrell "Tank" Babbs – writer
- Danny Cheung – mastering engineer
- Jerry "Texx" Franklin – writer
- Jesus Garnica – mixing assistant
- Jaycen Joshua – mixing engineer
- Robert Newt – writer
- Song Dynasty – producer
- J. Valentine – writer

== Charts ==
=== Weekly charts ===
Weekly chart performance for "Emergency"
Chart (2010–11)	Peak position
US Bubbling Under Hot 100 (Billboard)	21
US Adult R&B Songs (Billboard)	4
US Hot R&B/Hip-Hop Songs (Billboard)	23

=== Year-end charts ===
Year-end chart performance for "Emergency"
Chart (2011)	Position
US Adult R&B Songs (Billboard)	21
US Hot R&B/Hip-Hop Songs (Billboard)	91

== Release history ==
Release history and formats for "Emergency"
Region	Date	Format(s)	Label	Ref.
United States	October 5, 2010	Digital download	Atlantic	
