= R&B Money =

Studio album by Tank
- Released: August 19, 2022
- Genre: R&B
- Length: 56:12
- Labels: R&B Money; Atlantic

Tank chronology
Elevation (2019)	R&B Money (2022)	Experience (2026)

Singles from R&B Money
- 1. "Can't Let It Show" Released: February 26, 2021; 2. "I Deserve" Released: October 29, 2021; 3. "Slow" Released: June 10, 2022; 4. "See Through Love" Released: January 29, 2023

R&B Money is the tenth studio album by American R&B singer Tank. It was released on August 19, 2022, by Atlantic Records and his synergetic label R&B Money after which the album was titled. Prior to the release, Tank announced that R&B Money would be his final studio album, triggered in part by loss of hearing in his right ear in 2021. He released a deluxe edition of the album titled R&B Money: The Vault on April, 26 2024, containing five new songs.

== Chart performance ==
R&B Money debuted and peaked at number 36 on the US Billboard Top Current Album Sales in the week of September 3, 2022. The same week, it also reached number 60 on the US Top Album Sales chart. The album became Tank's first project to reach neither the Billboard 200 nor the Top R&B/Hip-Hop Albums chart. However, the album had two singles reach number 1 on the R&B charts: "Slow" featuring J. Valentine in fall 2022 and "See Through Love" featuring Chris Brown in spring 2023.

== Track listing ==
R&B Money track listing
No.	Title	Writer(s)	Producer(s)	Length
1.	"R&B Money"	Durrell Babbs; La'Chaz Holloway; Travis Bruce	Holloway	1:29
2.	"When You Dance"	Babbs; Holloway; Tshiswaka Kayembe, Jr.	Holloway; Kayembe	3:09
3.	"Home"	Babbs; Brandon Henson; Ellery "E Mack" McKinney; Michael Jiminez; Phillip "Nes" Coleman, Jr.	Coleman	3:42
4.	"No Limit" (featuring Alex Isley)	Babbs; Alexandra Isley; Carl McCormick	Cardiak; Dylan Graham; Justin Zim	3:36
5.	"Slow" (featuring J. Valentine)	Babbs; Andrew Castleberry; Arnold Dudley, Jr.; Graham; Kyle Gruenig; Leauxfi; Nicole Neely; William Gittens	Graham; Moe The Natural; Leauxfi^{[a]}; Neely^{[a]}	3:20
6.	"Morning" (featuring Vedo)	Babbs; Dwight Richardson; Wilbart McCoy	Doh Boy	2:57
7.	"Can't Let It Show"	Babbs; Kate Bush	Tank	3:37
8.	"See Through Love" (featuring Chris Brown)	Babbs; Travis Bruce	Tank	3:50
9.	"Spoil Her Alert"	Babbs; Shawn Holmes	Holmes	3:26
10.	"I Deserve"	Babbs	Tank	3:49
11.	"Too Late"	Babbs; Richardson	Doh Boy	3:45
12.	"Make Sure" (featuring Feather)	Babbs; Jesenia "Feather" Howell; Shawn Holmes	Holmes	3:27
13.	"Let's Take a Ride" (featuring Rotimi and Tverse)	Babbs; Olurotimi Akinosho; Ronald "Yonny" Ferebee, Jr.; Bruce	Ferebee	4:13
14.	"It's Nothing"	Babbs; Richardson; Bruce	Doh Boy	3:10
15.	"Awesome" (featuring Blaq Tuxedo)	Babbs; Darius Logan; Dominique Logan; Bruce	Blaq Tuxedo	3:11
16.	"Regular"	Babbs; Darius Logan; Dominique Logan; Bruce	Blaq Tuxedo	3:30
17.	"Summer Killa"	Babbs; Darius Logan; Dominique Logan; Bruce	Blaq Tuxedo	2:27
Total length:				56:12

R&B Money : THE VAULT (Bonus Tracks)
No.	Title	Writer(s)	Producer(s)	Length
2.	"Before We Get Started" (featuring Fabolous)	Derelle Rideout; Andre Robertson; Dirk Pate; Fabolous	Bizness Boi	2:55
5.	"Come Inside"	Tank	Cardiak	3:21
9.	"Lonely"	Tank; Bizness Boi; Lonny Bereal; Vanessa Wood	Bizness Boi	2:54
14.	"War"	Tank; The Co-Captains	The Co-Captains	3:13
17.	"Wanna Love You"	Tank; J. Valentine; Dirk Pate	Tank	2:22

Notes

- ^{^[a]} signifies co-producer(s)

== Charts ==
Chart performance for R&B Money
Chart (2022)	Peak position
US Top Current Album Sales (Billboard)	36

== Release history ==
R&B Money release history
Region	Date	Edition(s)	Format	Label	Ref(s)
Various	August 19, 2022	Standard	CD; digital download; streaming	R&B Money; Atlantic	
Various	April, 26 2024	Deluxe (R&B Money: The Vault)	CD; digital download; streaming	R&B Money; Atlantic	
