= TGT (group) =

American supergroup

- Origin: U.S.
- Genre: R&B
- Years active: 2007–2015
- Label: Atlantic
- Past members: Tyrese; Ginuwine; Tank

TGT was an American supergroup that consisted of R&B singers Tyrese (Tyrese Gibson), Ginuwine (Elgin Baylor Lumpkin) and Tank (Durrell Babbs). TGT is named after the first letter of each of the trio's stage names (T for Tyrese, G for Ginuwine, and the other T for Tank). The three are close friends and Tyrese was best man at Ginuwine's wedding, but TGT represented their first collaboration. Despite being together as a super group since its formation in 2007, it released its only album that debuted in August 2013 titled Three Kings on Atlantic Records.

== Beginnings ==
Their first song in 2007 was a remix of Tank's "Please Don't Go" released as "Please Don't Go (The TGT Remix)". The trio also appeared on Slim Thug's single "Let Me Grind".

In an interview, Tyrese said the group would be the "ultimate R&B fan experience. Me, Tank and Ginuwine have been talking about this forever. The reason why this makes sense is that besides all of us being R&B singers, we're all good friends. Every time I see Tank, every time I see Ginuwine, we always have good energy regardless."

The trio planned the Shirts Off Tour for late 2007, with Avant as an opening act. As part of the tour, they planned to hold auditions for a fourth member of the group. The tour faced delays, however, and was anticipated for early 2008.

The group faced difficulties given that each member of the trio was signed to a different record label, and on August 21, 2008, Ginuwine announced on his MySpace blog that due to label and legal issues they will not be able to release an official TGT album at the moment.

== Comeback ==
On September 22, 2012, Tyrese revealed on his Twitter page that the group has been officially signed to Atlantic Records. Although together on and off for many years, TGT released their debut album Three Kings on August 20, 2013, under Atlantic Records.

== Discography ==
=== Studio albums ===
List of albums, with selected chart positions
Title	Album details	Peak chart positions						Sales
Title	Album details	US	US R&B	NLD	KOR Int.	UK	UK R&B	Sales
Three Kings	Released: August 20, 2013; Label: Atlantic; Format: CD, LP	3	1	96	76	95	9	US: 76,000 (Note: As of August 2013)

=== Singles ===
List of singles, with selected chart positions, showing year released and album name
Title	Year	Peak chart positions			Album
Title	Year	US	US R&B	US Adult R&B	Album
"Please Don't Go (The TGT Remix)"	2007	42	2	1	Non-album single
"Sex Never Felt Better"	2013	—	38	13	Three Kings
"I Need"	2013	—	29	5	Three Kings
"Next Time Around"	2014	—	—	6	Three Kings

== Awards/nominations ==
- Grammy Awards
  - 2014, Best R&B Album: "Three Kings" (Nominated)
- Soul Train Awards
  - 2013, New Artist of the Year: "TGT" (Nominated)
- BET Awards
  - 2014, Best Group: "TGT" (Nominated)
