= Sex Love & Pain II =

Studio album by Tank
- Released: January 22, 2016
- Length: 51:20
- Labels: R&B Money; Atlantic

Tank chronology
Stronger (2014)	Sex Love & Pain II (2016)	Savage (2017)

Singles from Sex Love & Pain II
- 1. "You Don't Know" Released: August 19, 2015; 2. "#BDAY" Released: January 08, 2016

Sex Love & Pain II is the seventh studio album by American R&B singer-songwriter Tank. It was released on January 22, 2016, by Atlantic Records and his synergetic label R&B Money. Sex Love & Pain II debuted at number 15 on the US Billboard 200 with 20,000 equivalent album units; it sold 17,000 copies in its first week. The album boasted over 2.1 million streams. It was the nine best-selling album of the week. Sex Love & Pain II was Tank's fifth solo album to debut at number one on the Top R&B/Hip-Hop Albums.

== Critical response ==
Professional ratings
Review scores
Source	Rating
AllMusic	2.5/5 stars

AllMusic editor Andy Kellman found that Sex Love & Pain II was "no nostalgia trip. While there are some instances where Tank is either longing for his woman or seeking repentance, the bulk of the album regards its title's first word. Tank's armed with another bunch of sleek slow-jam productions to complement his libidinous verses and, more than ever, his name is representative of his lyrical subtlety as much as his build [...] Tank's voice is as strong as ever. The repetition of the largely unimaginative lyrics and number of indistinct productions, however, make the album verge on monotony. This is not among his better, more imaginative releases."

== Track listing ==
Sex Love & Pain II track listing
No.	Title	Writer(s)	Length
1.	"SLP2"	Durrell Babbs	4:46
2.	"You Don't Know" (featuring Wale)	Babbs; Alvin Isaacs; Bryan Nelson; Olubowale Akintimehin; Eric Bellinger; Cynthia Biggs; Kenneth Gamble; Dexter Wansel	4:07
3.	"She With the Shit" (featuring Rich Homie Quan)	Babbs; Johnny Stokes; Brandon "B.A.M" Hodge; J. Valentine	3:38
4.	"#BDAY" (featuring Chris Brown, Siya & Sage the Gemini)	Babbs; Chris Brown; Trevor Jackson; Michelle Sherman; Valentine	5:13
5.	"F***in Wit Me"	Babbs; Darrell "Delite" Allamby; Lincoln Browder; Kenneth Dickerson; Bryan Harrison; Mele Moore; Rickey "Slikk" Offord; Micah Powell; Antoinette Roberson; Valentine	4:04
6.	"Relationship Goals"	Chopovski Beats & Hooks; Valentine	4:42
7.	"I Love Ya" (featuring Yo Gotti)	Babbs; Hodge; Gotti; Valentine	5:19
8.	"So Cold"	Babbs; Hodge; Valentine	4:02
9.	"Better for You"	Babbs; Zena Foster	3:42
10.	"Already in Love" (featuring Shawn Stockman)	Babbs; Hodge; Gotti; Nicholas Baker; Shawn Stockman; Chopovski Beats & Hooks	4:09
11.	"Him Her Them"	Babbs; Hodge; Valentine	5:12
12.	"Bishop Cognac (Skit)"	Babbs; Valentine	2:23

Target bonus tracks
No.	Title	Writer(s)	Producer(s)	Length
13.	"Hold Up"	Tank; Trevor Jackson; J. Valentine	Tank
14.	"Don't Let Go"	Tank; Trevor Jackson; J. Valentine	Tank

== Charts ==
=== Weekly charts ===
Weekly chart performance for Sex Love & Pain II
Chart (2016)	Peak position
US Billboard 200	15
US Top R&B/Hip-Hop Albums (Billboard)	1

=== Year-end charts ===
Year-end chart performance for Sex Love & Pain II
Chart (2016)	Position
US Top R&B/Hip-Hop Albums (Billboard)	55

== Release history ==
Sex Love & Pain II release history
Region	Date	Format	Label	Ref(s)
Various	September 29, 2017	CD; Digital download; Streaming	R&B Money; Atlantic	
