= When We =

Single by Tank

from the album Savage
- Released: June 16, 2017
- Length: 5:09: 4:40 (remix); 3:49 (remix radio edit)
- Label: Atlantic
- Songwriters: Durrell Babbs; Carl McCormick; Johnnie Newt
- Producer: Cardiak

Tank singles chronology
"#BDAY" (2016)	"When We" (2017)	"Dream About You" (2017)

Music video
- "When We" on YouTube

"When We" is a song by American singer Tank. It was released on June 16, 2017, as the first single from his eighth studio album, Savage (2017). Tank co-wrote the track with J. Valentine and Cardiak, the latter also produced it. The music video premiered in August 2017.

Tank performed "When We" at the Soul Train Music Awards in November 2017. The official remix of the song featuring American singers Trey Songz and Ty Dolla Sign was released in February 2018, with the music video premiered in the next month.

== Background ==
While talking about the inspiration behind the song in an interview with Genius, Tank said;

"The track really did it for me. I met Cardiak at Rooftop at a party in LA. He’s like, "I got that fire." I said, "You got the fire?" He said, "I got that fire." He’s talking about, "I’ll be on your album." I said, "Hm, interesting." Let me hear your work. He sent me a load of maybe five or six tracks, and this was one of ‘em. I went to the studio, Jerry Wonda Studio Platinum Sound. I just turned the track on. I said, "This sounds like the soundtrack to when some fucking starts happening." You don’t necessarily wanna play trap music if you trying to have a sexy moment, but you do wanna get mildly aggressive. You know what I’m saying?."

== Critical reception ==
Sydney Scott from Essence wrote that the song "feels like a sexy return to pure R&B, a soundtrack to a romantic evening that ends in the bedroom". Courtney Bryant of Parle gave a positive review to the song saying it "has a sensual vibe to it" and "definitely delivers just as much as his past work, if not better".

== Promotion ==
The music video for "When We" premiered via Tank's YouTube channel on August 16, 2017. While talking about the video in an interview with Billboard, Tank said: "Well, I wanted the song to sound literal. But, I also wanted people to explore their horizons, in terms of their sexuality. I think sometimes people can be basic in these moments. And, it is not because they are trying to be basic. Sometimes, you just get accustomed to doing a certain thing all the time. And it works for you. Sometimes we forget to be creative [in bed]. We forget to use our imagination. So, even though the song has a very literal word, that word can go so many different ways. That is what I wanted to show. How deep, and how dark this word can be. And, how beautiful at the same time."

Tank performed the song live at the Soul Train Music Awards in November 2017. On February 2, 2018, in an Instagram livestream Tank teased the remix of "When We" featuring American singers Trey Songz and Ty Dolla Sign. He released it on February 13, 2018. The music video for the remix, directed by J Valentine and BenMarc, premiered on March 16, 2018.

== Charts ==
=== Weekly charts ===
Weekly chart performance for "When We"
Chart (2017)	Peak position
US Billboard Hot 100	78
US Hot R&B/Hip-Hop Songs (Billboard)	35
US Adult R&B Songs (Billboard)	1

=== Year-end charts ===
Year-end chart performance for "When We"
Chart (2017)	Position
US Adult R&B Songs (Billboard)	18
Chart (2018)	Position
US Adult R&B Songs (Billboard)	1

== Certifications ==
Certifications of "When We"
Region	Certification	Certified units/sales
United States (RIAA)	Platinum	1,000,000^{‡}
^{‡} Sales+streaming figures based on certification alone.

== Release history ==
Release history and formats for "When We"
Region	Date	Format(s)	Label	Ref.
United States	June 16, 2017 February 14, 2018	Digital download Remix	Atlantic	
