= Please Don't Go (Tank song) =

Single by Tank

from the album Sex, Love & Pain
- Released: December 19, 2006
- Genre: R&B
- Length: 4:34 (main edit); 3:53 (radio edit)
- Label: Blackground
- Songwriters: Durrell "Tank" Babbs; Lonny Bereal
- Producer: Tank

Tank singles chronology
"One Man" (2002)	"Please Don't Go" (2006)	"Heartbreaker" (2007)

"Please Don't Go" is a song by American singer Tank. It was written and produced along with Lonny Bereal for his third studio album Sex, Love & Pain (2007). It was released by Blackground Records as the album's first single. The single remained at number one on the US Billboard Adult R&B Songs chart for over six weeks.

== Music video ==
On December 31, 2007, the music video for "Please Don't Go" appeared at number 94 on BET's Notarized: Top 100 Videos of 2007 countdown.

== Remix ==
The official remix is called "Please Don't Go (The TGT Remix)", and features TGT bandmates Ginuwine and Tyrese Gibson, this is TGT's first single as a group. The other remix features rapper Yung Joc.

== Charts ==
=== Weekly charts ===
Weekly chart performance for "Please Don't Go"
Chart (2007)	Peak position
US Billboard Hot 100	42
US Hot R&B/Hip-Hop Songs (Billboard)	2

=== Year-end charts ===
Year-end chart performance for "Please Don't Go"
Chart (2007)	Position
US Hot R&B/Hip-Hop Songs (Billboard)	3
