= One Man (Tank album) =

Studio album by Tank
- Released: October 28, 2002
- Genre: R&B
- Length: 70:37
- Label: Blackground; Universal
- Producer: Big Tank; Bud'da; Caviar & Overdose; Mannie Fresh; Kevin Jackson; Jazze Pha; Dennis Ross III; Tank; Bob "Big Bob" Terry; Rick White; Curtis L. Williams

Tank chronology
Force of Nature (2001)	One Man (2002)	Sex, Love & Pain (2007)

Singles from One Man
- 1. "One Man" Released: 2002; 2. "Let Me Live" Released: 2002

One Man is the second studio album by American recording artist Tank. It was released on October 28, 2002, by Blackground Records and Universal Records.

== Critical reception ==
Professional ratings
Review scores
Source	Rating
AllMusic	2.5/5 stars

Dan LeRoy of AllMusic rated One Man two and a half out of five stars. He wrote that "ever the sensitive guy, R&B loverman Tank thoughtfully divides his sophomore disc in two, front-loading it with tender, sexed-up balladry and saving the up-tempo stuff for the second half. On the surface, it's an especially welcome gesture because, in the reverse of how this formula usually works, Tank is much more likely to lose listeners when he aims for the dancefloor than the bedroom." Billboard wrote about the album: "Preferring the simpler things in life, the singer is more than willing to give it all up for his woman – and they say chivalry is dead! One Man should be a perfect fit for both mainstream and adult R&B radio."

== Commercial performance ==
One Man debuted and peaked at number 20 on the US Billboard 200 and number five on the Top R&B/Hip-Hop Albums chart. By 2007, the album had sold 246,000 units, according to Nielsen Soundscan.

== Track listing ==
One Man track listing
No.	Title	Writer(s)	Producer(s)	Length
1.	"Interlude" (featuring Adimu Colon)	Durrell Babbs	Tank	1:00
2.	"One Man (Intro)"	Babbs	Tank	0:59
3.	"One Man"	Babbs	Tank	4:25
4.	"Supa Sexy"	Babbs; David Ritz; Marvin Gaye; Odell Brown	Tank	4:19
5.	"My Place"	Babbs; Kannon Cross; William Moore	Caviar & Overdose	5:38
6.	"Unpredictable"	Babbs; Static Major	Tank	3:41
7.	"Cake & Ice Cream" (featuring Heat)	Babbs; Cris Jones; Jarrod Whitaker; Thai Jones; Yvette Williams	Tank	4:21
8.	"Close" (featuring Mowett)	Babbs; Brandon Springfield; Christian Dudley; Jerry Franklin; Mikka Harvey	Tank	3:48
9.	"I'm the Reason"	Babbs; Curtis L. Williams; Bob "Big Bob" Terry	Tank; Williams; Terry	5:01
10.	"Make Me Wanna Sing" (featuring Sparkle)	Babbs; Minnie Riperton; Richard J. Rudolph	Tank	3:46
11.	"Let Me Live" (featuring Mannie Fresh & Jazze Pha)	Babbs; Andy Morris; Byron Thomas; Ian Devaney; Lisa Stansfield; Phalon Alexander	Fresh; Pha	4:03
12.	"Party Like a Thug" (featuring Baby Da #1 Stunna)	Babbs; Bryan Williams; Thomas	Fresh	4:05
13.	"I Wanna Be That" (featuring Jazze Pha)	Johnta Austin; Alexander	Pha	3:49
14.	"No, Why?"	Babbs; Rick White; Kevin Jackson	Tank; White; Jackson	3:46
15.	"Club" (featuring Cavie)	Babbs; Cross	Tank	4:18
16.	"So Many Times"	Derryck Thornton; Major	Big Tank	4:26
17.	"Better Man"	Babbs; Cross	Bud'da	3:56
18.	"I Still Believe"	Adrianne Ross; Dennis Ross III	Dennis Ross III	5:01
Total length:				70:37

Sample credits

- "Supa Sexy" contains an interpolation from "Sexual Healing" as performed by Marvin Gaye.
- "Make Me Wanna Sing" contains a sample "Lovin' You" as performed by Minnie Riperton.
- "Let Me Live" contains melody and lyrics of "All Around the World" as performed by Lisa Stansfield.

== Charts ==
Chart performance for One Man
Chart (2002)	Peak position
US Billboard 200	20
US Top R&B/Hip-Hop Albums (Billboard)	4
