= Now or Never (Tank album) =

Studio album by Tank
- Released: December 14, 2010
- Genre: R&B
- Length: 43:19
- Label: Atlantic
- Producers: Song Dynasty (exec.); Kevin Barnes; Brandon Hodge; Jim Jonsin; Rico Love; Harvey Mason, Jr.; Stereotypes

Tank chronology
Sex, Love & Pain (2007)	Now or Never (2010)	This Is How I Feel (2012)

Singles from Now or Never
- 1. "Sex Music" Released: June 29, 2010; 2. "Emergency" Released: October 5, 2010; 3. "Celebration" Released: January 25, 2011; 4. "I Can't Make You Love Me" Released: May 10, 2011

Now or Never is the fourth studio album by American R&B singer-songwriter Tank. It was released on December 14, 2010 via Atlantic Records following his departure from longtime label Blackground Records.

== Background ==
The album was originally to be released in Fall 2009, but was delayed due to Tank leaving Blackground Records in September 2009. Since late 2008, many songs have leaked that many believed were to be on the new album, but most, if not all, of the songs are unlikely to make the final track list. In May 2010, Tank signed a new deal with Atlantic Records and aggressively began to work on the album. June 29, 2010 saw the release of the album's first single, Sex Music. The original title for the album was Sex Love & Pain II: The All Night Experience (which would be released six years later), then was changed to simply All Night before finally settling on Now or Never The original release date of the album was to be September 21, 2010, then was pushed to November 2, 2010 and now the final release date is December 14, 2010. The album is set to feature guest artists such as Drake & Chris Brown. Production is to come from the likes of Jim Jonsin, The Stereotypes, Brandon Alexander, Rico Love, Harvey Mason, Jr., plus Tank and his production team, Song Dynasty. "It's a happier album, I'm appreciating more, I'm celebrating more," he admits in an interview with TheBoomBox.com. "The sexual experiences on the album are deep but they're not dark. It's a great moment on the album where I think everyone can ride and have a smile on their face."

== Singles ==
The album's first single, Sex Music, was released on June 8, 2010. It debuted at number 74 on Billboard's Hot R&B/Hip-Hop Songs chart. The video for "Sex Music" premiered on Vibe.com on August 5, 2010. The second single, "Emergency", was released on October 5, 2010.

== Critical reception ==
Professional ratings
Review scores
Source	Rating
About.com	3/5 stars
AllMusic	3/5 stars

Andy Kellman of AllMusic rated Now or Never two and a half out of five stars. He wrote that "for most of this disc's duration, Tank sticks to his solo-artist strength, providing a steady stream of low-key songs for the bedroom. Most of it simmers. The remainder boils. It’s not bound to make him much more popular, but those who dig beneath the surface of mainstream R&B will be rewarded." Jon Caramanica, writing for The New York Times, commented that Now or Never “continues his unlikely streak of beautiful, largely throwback-minded albums that have made him something of a cult favorite among the R&B cognoscenti.”

== Chart performance ==
The album debuted at number thirty five on the US Billboard 200 chart, with first-week sales of 44,000 copies. Since then, the album has sold a total of 215,000 copies in the United States.

== Track listing ==
Now or Never track listing
No.	Title	Writer(s)	Producer(s)	Length
1.	"Showtime (Intro)"	Babbs	Song Dynasty	1:30
2.	"Sex Music"	Durrell Babbs; Robert Newt; Harvey Mason, Jr.; Johnnie Valentine; Jerry Franklin; Kristina Stephens	Song Dynasty; Mason	3:40
3.	"Celebration" (featuring Drake)	Babbs; Aubrey Graham; Newt; Valentine; Franklin; Stephens	Stereotypes	4:12
4.	"Emergency (Intro)"	Babbs	Song Dynasty	0:47
5.	"Emergency"	Durrell Babbs; Newt; Valentine; Franklin; Stephens	Song Dynasty	4:14
6.	"Scream"	Jim Jonsin; Danny Morris; Rico Love	Jonsin; Love	4:03
7.	"Keep It 100"	Babbs; Newt; Valentine; Franklin	Song Dynasty	4:06
8.	"Foreplay" (featuring Chris Brown)	Brown; Kevin Barnes	Barnes	4:03
9.	"Can I (Intro)"	Babbs	Song Dynasty	1:32
10.	"Can I"	Babbs; Newt; Valentine; Franklin	Song Dynasty	3:34
11.	"Amazing"	Aaron Sledge; Brandon Hodge	Hodge; Song Dynasty	4:01
12.	"You Mean That Much"	Babbs; Newt; Mason; Valentine; Russell; Franklin; Stephens	Song Dynasty; Mason	3:39
13.	"I Can't Make You Love Me"	James Allen Shamlin; Mike Barry Reid	Song Dynasty	3:57

Best Buy bonus tracks
No.	Title	Writer(s)	Producer(s)	Length
14.	"Let Me Know"	Babbs; Newt; Valentine; Franklin	Song Dynasty	3:44
15.	"Sex Nights" (Remix of "Sex Music")	Babbs; Newt; Mason; Valentine; Franklin; Stephens	Song Dynasty	3:59

Now or Never – Deluxe edition
No.	Title	Writer(s)	Producer(s)	Length
14.	"On My Way" (featuring J. Valentine)	Babbs; Newt; Valentine; Franklin	Song Dynasty	4:17
15.	"I Can't Make You Love Me" (Acoustic version)	Shamlin; Reid	Song Dynasty	4:33

== Charts ==
=== Weekly charts ===
Weekly chart performance for Now or Never
Chart (2010)	Peak position
US Billboard 200	35
US Top R&B/Hip-Hop Albums (Billboard)	10

=== Year-end charts ===
Year-end chart performance for Now or Never
Chart (2011)	Position
US Top R&B/Hip-Hop Albums (Billboard)	42

== Release history ==
Now or Never release history
Region	Date	Format	Label
United States	December 14, 2010	CD; digital download	Atlantic Records
