= Maybe I Deserve =

2001 single by Tank

Single by Tank

from the album Force of Nature
- Released: February 10, 2001
- Genre: R&B
- Length: 5:00 (album version); 4:09 (single edit)
- Label: Blackground
- Songwriter(s): Durrell Babbs
- Producer(s): Durrell Babbs

Tank singles chronology
"Freaky" (2000)	"Maybe I Deserve" (2001)	"Slowly" (2001)

Music video
- "Maybe I Deserve" on VH1.com

"Maybe I Deserve" is a song written, produced and performed by American R&B singer Tank, issued as the first single from his debut studio album Force of Nature (2001). The song is his biggest hit to date on the US Billboard Hot 100, peaking at number 38 in 2001.

== Critical reception ==
In a retrospective review, Jon Caramanica, writing for The New York Times, commented that the track “remains his best song. It’s a vicious self-flagellation in which he concedes that his woman has earned the right to torture him by flirting (or more) with another man, a punishment for his own misdeeds”.

== Music video ==
The official music video for the song was directed by Jeremy Rall.

== Track listings ==
CD single
No.	Title	Producer(s)	Length
1.	"Maybe I Deserve" (Album Version)	Durrell "Tank" Babbs	5:01
2.	"Maybe I Deserve" (Budda Remix)	Tank; Bud'da^{[a]}	5:09
3.	"Maybe I Deserve" (Budda Remix Instrumental)	Tank; Bud'da^{[a]}	5:10

Notes

- ^{^a} denotes additional producer(s)

== Charts ==
=== Weekly charts ===
Weekly chart performance for "Maybe I Deserve"
Chart (2001)	Peak position
US Billboard Hot 100	38
US Hot R&B/Hip-Hop Songs (Billboard)	7

=== Year-end charts ===
Year-end chart performance for "Maybe I Deserve"
Chart (2001)	Position
US Hot R&B/Hip-Hop Songs (Billboard)	27
