= Sex, Love & Pain =

Sex, Love, & Pain

Studio album by Tank
- Released: May 15, 2007
- Genre: R&B
- Length: 56:24
- Label: Blackground; Universal Motown
- Producer: Antonio Dixon; Eric Jackson; St. Nick; Steven Russell; Timbaland; the Underdogs

Tank chronology
One Man (2002)	Sex, Love, & Pain (2007)	Now or Never (2010)

Singles from Sex Love & Pain
- 1. "Please Don't Go" Released: December 19, 2006; 2. "Heartbreaker" Released: August 10, 2007

Sex, Love & Pain is the third studio album by American R&B singer-songwriter Tank. It was released on May 15, 2007, by Blackground Records and Universal Motown Records. The album debuted at number 2 on the Billboard 200, selling 103,000 copies in its first week, while reaching number 1 on Billboard's Top R&B/Hip-Hop Albums. Tank's first album to have a Parental Advisory sticker, Sex, Love & Pain was nominated for a Grammy Award for Best R&B Album at the 50th Grammy Awards.

The album's lead single was "Please Don't Go", which topped the US Billboard Adult R&B Songs chart for six weeks.

== Critical reception ==
Professional ratings
Review scores
Source	Rating
About	3/5 stars
AllMusic	4/5 stars
Entertainment Weekly	B−
USA Today	2.5/4 stars

AllMusic praised Sex, Love & Pain for its smooth urban contemporary production and Tank's "impassioned, gospel-infused delivery," highlighting his "pleading, flexible tenor" and intimate approach to themes of romance and sensuality. The website noted that the album's style would appeal to fans of artists such as Ginuwine, Omarion, and R. Kelly. Steve Jones of USA Today described Sex, Love & Pain as a solid return for Tank, praising his soulful delivery and ability to explore the emotional highs and lows of relationships. He noted that the album effectively balanced themes of regret, betrayal, and intimacy, though some songs were held back by uninspired sentiments.

Mark Edward Nero of About.com praised Tank's songwriting and emotional depth, describing Sex, Love & Pain as a "drama-filled roller coaster of ballads" that explores "love, lust, hate, pain, betrayal and more." He highlighted Tank's ability to create vivid narratives but felt that his vocal style lacked distinctiveness, noting that while his voice was "strong and can be powerful," it did not yet set him apart from other R&B singers. Similarly, Entertainment Weekly's Simon Vozick-Levinson gave the album a B− rating, praising Tank's "limber tenor" and songwriting abilities while noting that he lacked a "distinct identity." He found the album's slow jams and emotional ballads competent but felt Tank struggled to "break free from commercial R&B conventions."

== Commercial performance ==
Sex, Love & Pain became Tank's highest-charting album to date. The album debuted at number two on the US Billboard 200, surpassing the peak positions of his previous releases, and reached number one on the Top R&B/Hip-Hop Albums chart. On the 2007 year-end charts, it ranked at number 36 on the Top R&B/Hip-Hop Albums chart.

== Track listing ==
Sex, Love & Pain track listing
No.	Title	Writer(s)	Producer(s)	Length
1.	"Coldest"	Durrell Babbs; Thai Olivia Jones	Tank	6:52
2.	"I'm Coming Home"	Babbs; Tom Brocker; Robert Nelson Relf; Melvin Curtis Coleman; Keri Hilson	St. Nick	3:05
3.	"My Body"	Babbs; Harvey Mason Jr.; Steven Russell; Damon Thomas; Antonio Dixon	The Underdogs; Tank	3:51
4.	"Please Don't Go"	Babbs; Charles Bereal	Tank	5:53
5.	"I Hate U"	Babbs; Luke Boyd; Nazerine Vera Henderson	Tank	5:15
6.	"Heartbreaker"	Babbs; Mason; Thomas; Dawkins; Dixon	Dixon; Eric Jackson	4:30
7.	"Who Dat"	Babbs; Mason; Russell; Thomas; Dixon	The Underdogs; Russell; Tank	3:49
8.	"When"	Babbs; Mason; Russell; Thomas	The Underdogs; Tank	6:22
9.	"Wedding Song"	Babbs; Mason; Thomas	The Underdogs	4:38
10.	"My Heart"	Babbs; Mason; Russell; Thomas; Dixon	The Underdogs	4:14
11.	"I Love U"	Babbs; Coleman; Michael Stokes; Emanuel Johnson; Hilson	The St. Nick	4:03
12.	"I Love Them Girls" (Timbaland Remix)	Babbs; Mason; Thomas; Dixon	Timbaland	3:57
Total length:				56:24

== Personnel ==
Credits for Sex, Love & Pain adapted from Allmusic.

- Flent Coleman – Executive Producer
- Jimmy Douglas – Mixing
- Sean Garrett – Composer
- Barry Handerson – Executive Producer
- Dawn Haynes – Wardrobe
- Keri Hilson – Composer
- Eric D. Jackson – Producer
- Harvey Mason, Jr. – Mixing
- Aaron Renner – Assistant Engineer, Mixing
- Steve Russell – Producer
- Dexter Simmons – Mixing
- Tank – Composer, Primary Artist
- Timbaland – Composer, Guest Artist, Producer
- Eric Williams – Photography

== Charts ==
=== Weekly charts ===
Weekly chart performance for Sex, Love & Pain
Chart (2007)	Peak position
US Billboard 200	2
US Top R&B/Hip-Hop Albums (Billboard)	1

=== Year-end charts ===
Year-end chart performance for Sex, Love & Pain
Chart (2007)	Position
US Billboard 200	169
US Top R&B/Hip-Hop Albums (Billboard)	36
