= Gone (Aaliyah and Tank song) =

2025 single by Aaliyah and Tank

Single by Aaliyah with Tank

from the album Unstoppable
- Released: May 2, 2025
- Genre: R&B
- Length: 4:02
- Label: Blackground 2.0
- Songwriters: Stephen Garrett; Durrell Babbs
- Producers: Sean Garrett; Azul Wynter

Aaliyah singles chronology
"Poison" (2021)	"Gone" (2025)

Tank singles chronology
"Before We Get Started" (2024)	"Gone" (2025)	"Control" (2025)

2D video
- "Gone" on YouTube

"Gone" is a song by American singer Aaliyah with singer and previous collaborator Tank. It was released on May 2, 2025, through Blackground Records 2.0, exclusively on the label's BLKStream music app, but saw a worldwide release on streaming and digital download sites on August 1, 2025. "Gone" is expected to be taken from Aaliyah's upcoming posthumous album, Unstoppable. It was written by Static Major and Tank. Production was overseen by Sean Garrett and Azul Wynter.

== Background and release ==
In the late 1990s, Tank worked as a backing singer for Aaliyah. In 1999, when Aaliyah was recording songs for her then upcoming third studio album, she asked Tank to provide adlibs on the song "Come Over", which went on to be released as a posthumous single in 2003. Tank also went on to write two songs for Aaliyah: "I Can Be" and "What If". On August 25, 2021, Barry Hankerson revealed in an interview with Big Tigger for WVEE that a posthumous album titled Unstoppable would be released in "a matter of weeks". The album was said to feature Drake, Snoop Dogg, Ne-Yo, Chris Brown, Future and use previously unreleased vocals recorded before Aaliyah's August 2001 death. In January 2024, Blackground Records hinted in an Instagram post that the release was "coming"; however, as of April 2026, no album has been released.

On May 2, 2025, Blackground Records 2.0 released the single "Gone", by Aaliyah, with former collaborator Tank. The single was released exclusively to the record label's streaming app, BLKStream, but saw a wider release to streaming and digital download sites on August 1, 2025.

Producer Sean Garrett opined, "Growing up admiring Aaliyah, who is such an icon, has completely been an inspiration for all of us [...] I could not have been more blessed to have made a record with her and Tank. Amazing voices and talent."

== Music video ==
A 2D music video was released on August 1, 2025, along with the announcement of a "3D holographic experience" provided by the Meta Quest app Soapbox

== Reaction ==
Like the previous Aaliyah single, "Poison", the release of "Gone" faced strong criticism from fans, who expressed distaste at the poor quality of Aaliyah's vocals, with some questioning the authenticity.

Tank made a statement following the release. He wrote, "[The song] featuring myself was supposed to be something good to preserve and continue the legacy of the amazing Aaliyah… This is not it. I’m out [...] The Aaliyah song you are hearing featuring myself, I did out of love for her. I had concerns and I expressed them. From the track to the vocals to the mix and to the visual [...] I still went forward knowing I would at least be able to approve the final products. I haven’t approved one thing you’ve heard or seen [...] Me thinking people had changed was my mistake and I own it [...] Aaliyah deserves better".

== Chart performance ==
Due to the lack of promotion by Blackground Records, "Gone" has only appeared on American airplay charts and failed to appear on the Billboard Hot 100. The single debuted at number 20 on the Adult R&B Airplay Chart, peaking at number one for two weeks in September 2025, becoming Aaliyah's first number one on that chart. It debuted at number 43 on the R&B/Hip Hop Airplay chart, peaking at number 13, and spent 20 weeks on that chart.

== Charts ==
Chart performance for "Gone"
Chart (2025)	Peak position
US Adult R&B Airplay (Billboard)	1
US R&B/Hip-Hop Airplay (Billboard)	13

== Release history ==
Release history and formats for "Gone"
Region	Date	Format	Label	Ref
Various	May 2, 2025	Exclusive to BLKStream app	Blackground Records 2.0 & Empire	
Various	August 1, 2025	Streaming, digital download	Blackground Records 2.0 & Empire	
