= Tank (entertainer) =

American singer (born 1976)

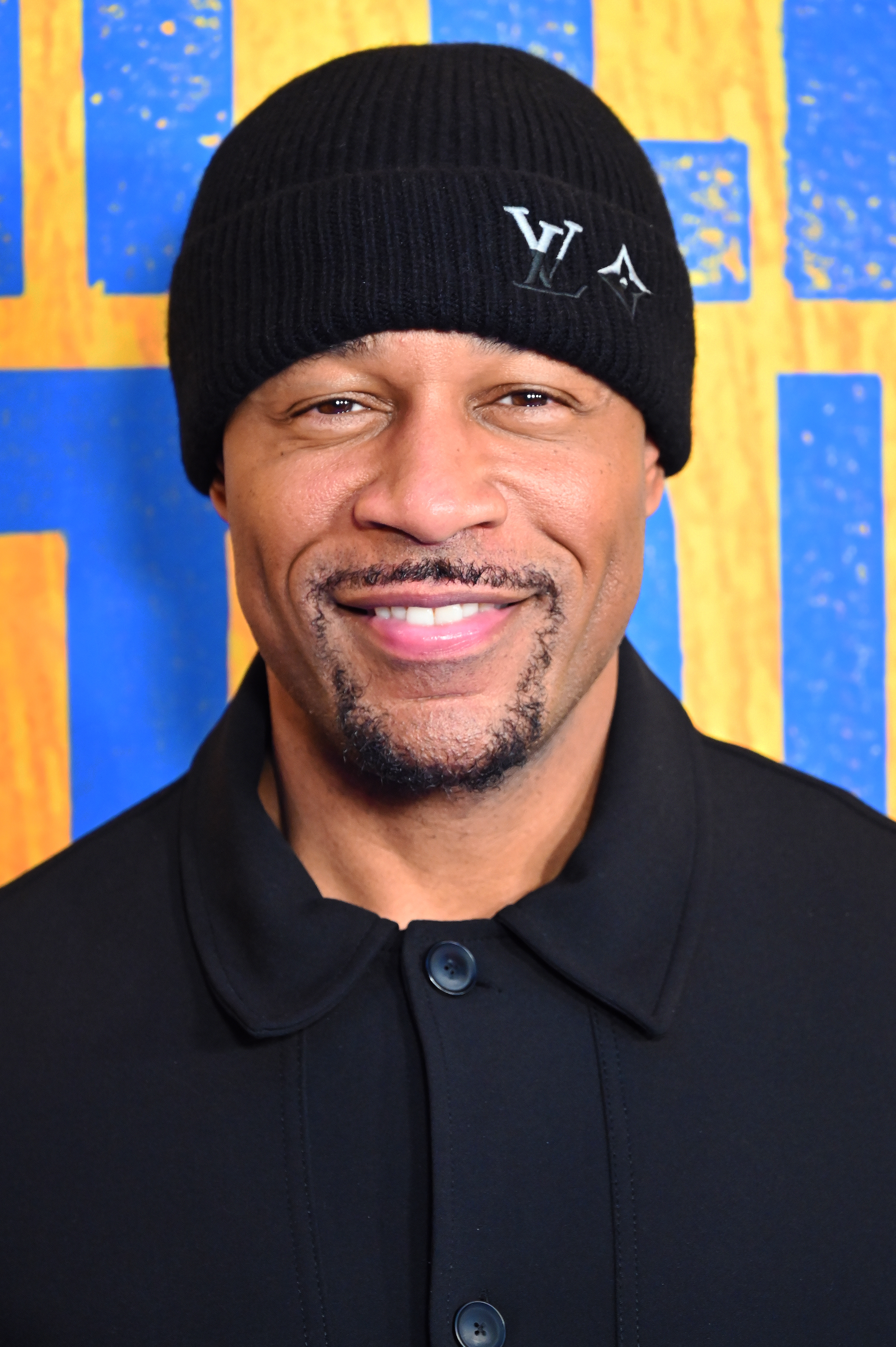
- Tank in 2025

Background information
- Born: January 1, 1976 (age 50); Milwaukee, Wisconsin, U.S.
- Origin: Clinton, Maryland, U.S.
- Genres: R&B; soul
- Occupations: Singer; songwriter; record producer; actor; podcaster
- Instruments: Vocals; piano
- Works: Discography; production
- Years active: 1996–present
- Labels: R&B Money; Empire; Atlantic; Blackground; Virgin; Universal
- Formerly of: TGT
- Spouse: Zena Foster (m. 2018)
- Children: 5

Durrell Artaze Babbs (born January 1, 1976), better known by his stage name Tank, is an American singer, songwriter, actor, record producer, and podcaster. He began his career as a backing vocalist for Aaliyah and Ginuwine, and signed a recording contract with the former's record label, Blackground Records as a performing act in 1998. His 2001 single, "Maybe I Deserve" peaked within the top 40 of the Billboard Hot 100 and led his debut studio album, Force of Nature (2001). It peaked within the top ten of the Billboard 200, while his second album, One Man (2002), peaked within the top 20 and was met with mixed critical reception.

After a five-year hiatus, he entered a joint venture with Motown to release his third album, Sex, Love & Pain (2007). Yielding his furthest commercial success, it peaked at number two on the Billboard 200 and was preceded by the Billboard Hot 100-top 50 single, "Please Don't Go". He parted ways with the labels in favor of Atlantic Records to release his following albums: Now or Never (2010), This Is How I Feel (2012), Stronger (2014), Sex, Love & Pain II (2014), and Savage (2017), the latter of which spawned the platinum-certified single "When We". Following his ninth album Elevation (2019), his tenth album, R&B Money (2022), was his final release with Atlantic.

In 2007, he formed the R&B trio TGT with contemporaries Ginuwine and Tyrese, with whom he released one studio album (2013). Along with recording, Tank has been credited with songwriting and production work for other artists, including Kelly Rowland, Chris Brown, Monica, Jamie Foxx, Aaliyah, Omarion, LeToya Luckett, NLT, and KeKe Wyatt. His record label, R&B Money, has signed frequent collaborator J. Valentine; the two began hosting a podcast of the same name in 2022, in which they interview noteworthy figures in the R&B scene. Tank has been nominated for four Grammy Awards, a Soul Train Music Award, and his podcast was nominated for Best Work of Music Journalism - Multimedia at the 2023 International Music Journalism Awards.

== Early life ==
Babbs was born in Milwaukee, Wisconsin, then he moved with his family as a child to Clinton, Maryland. He was a multisport athlete in high school and was offered the opportunity to play college football. However, Tank decided to focus on music, with his vocal talent being recognized to the point where R&B singer Ginuwine gave him an opportunity to sing background vocals for him during one of the latter's tours. Tank also became a backing singer for Aaliyah, whom he had met through Ginuwine in 1997.

Tank later signed as an artist with Aaliyah's record label Blackground Records.

== Music career ==
=== 2001–2007: Force of Nature, One Man and Sex, Love & Pain ===
In 2001, Tank released his debut album Force of Nature which spawned the moderate hit Maybe I Deserve". Also in 2001, Aaliyah released two songs that Tank had written for her, "I Can Be" and "What If", on her album Aaliyah.

In 2002, Tank released his second album One Man and a single of the same name. Tank provided vocals for I Care 4 U, Aaliyah's posthumous compilation album, featuring on the album's final single, "Come Over".

Tank released his third solo album, Sex, Love & Pain, in May 2007. The lead single of the album was the minor hit "Please Don't Go", which peaked at number 21 on the US Billboard Hot 100 chart. Later that year, Tank, alongside Ginuwine and Tyrese Gibson, formed the group TGT. The group was put on hold due to contractual issues, but signed with Atlantic Records in September 2012 to release their debut collaborative album, Three Kings the following year.

=== 2010–2014: Now or Never, This Is How I Feel and Stronger ===
Tank released his fourth studio album, Now or Never, in December 2010. Tank collaborated with artists who included Chris Brown, Drake, on this project. The singles were "Sex Music", "I Can't Make You Love Me", and "Emergency".

Tank released his fifth studio album, This Is How I Feel, in May 2012. Tank collaborated with the artists Chris Brown, Busta Rhymes, T.I. and Kris Stephens on the album. The song "Compliments", featuring Kris Stephens and T.I., was released as the lead single in October 2011.

On September 14, 2013, Tank sang the U.S. national anthem before the Floyd Mayweather Jr. vs. Canelo Álvarez fight in Las Vegas, Nevada.

His sixth studio album Stronger was released in August 2014. It featured the singles "You're My Star" and the title track. They did not make the US Hot 100 but both peaked in the Top 20 of the US Urban AC chart. The album marked a slight departure from his previous releases, focusing on a "retro R&B sound" for the album. Following disappointing sales of the release, Tank had claimed the album would be his last.

=== 2015–2020: Sex Love & Pain II and Savage ===
In February 2015, a mixtape album, If You Were Mine, was released. Later that year, Tank premiered a new single, "You Don't Know", featuring Wale. It served as the lead single for his seventh studio album Sex Love & Pain II, released in January 2016. The album debuted at #1 on the Billboard R&B chart (marking his 5th album to do so) and #15 on the US Top 200 Albums chart. A second single "#BDAY" followed later that year, in addition to a holiday EP A Classic Christmas Night in December, released independently.

In May 2017, Tank performed at Washington DC's Black Gay Pride event, garnering both praise and criticism and setting off a debate concerning the rare instances male R&B artists perform at LGBT events. In September 2017, Tank released his eighth studio album, Savage. The album's lead single "When We", has peaked at number 86 on the Billboard Hot 100. In October 2019, Tank released his ninth studio album ELEVATION. He then released a piano-laced EP titled While You Wait on March 27, 2020.

=== 2021-present: R&B Money and Experience ===
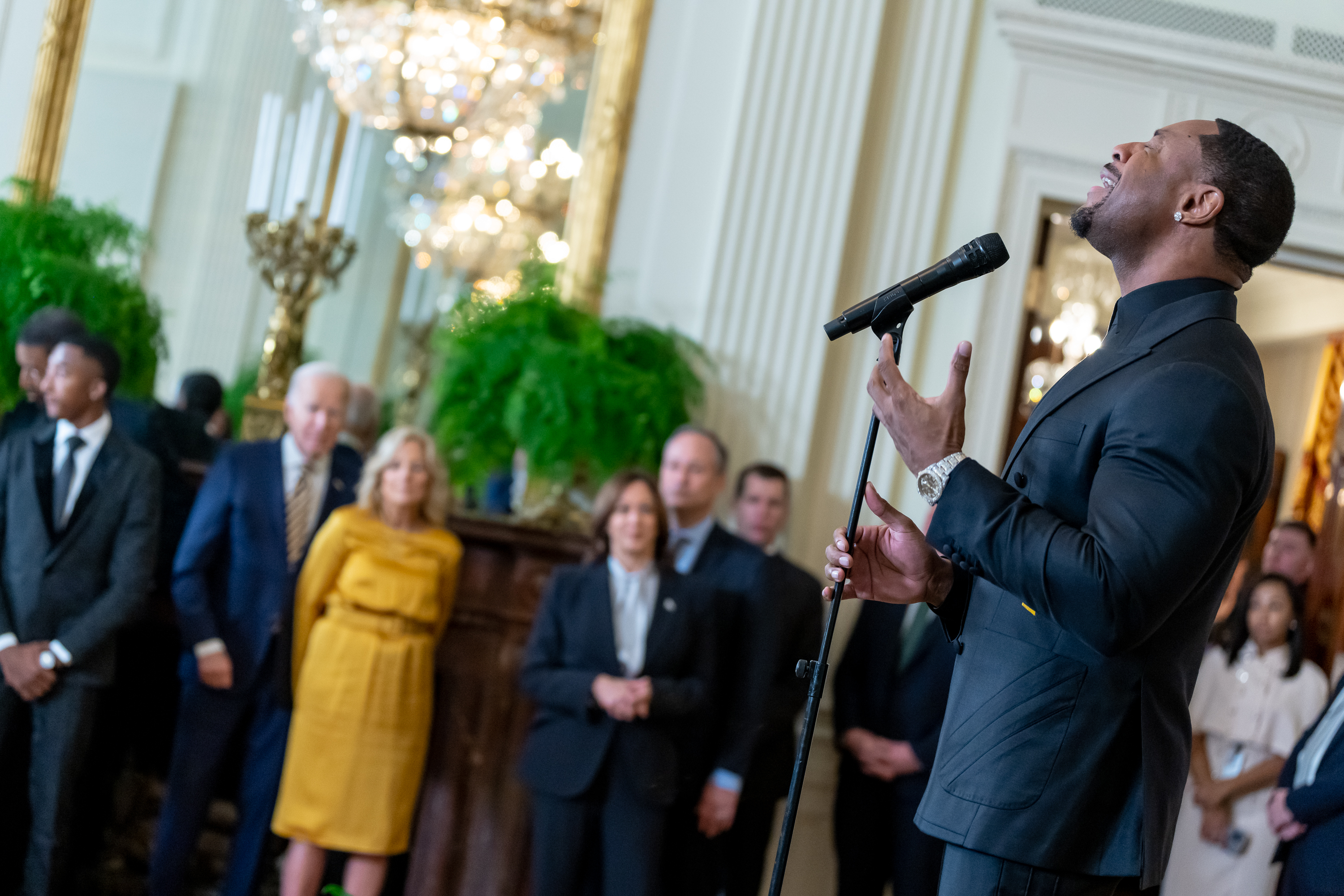
Tank performing at the White House in 2024

On February 26, 2021, Tank released the single "Can't Let It Show" of which the chorus interpolates the 1989 Kate Bush single "This Woman's Work". Kate Bush is credited for the song alongside Tank. In August 2021, it was announced that Blackground Records would be rereleasing discographies of artists including Tank, Aaliyah, Toni Braxton and Timbaland & Magoo. Tank's first three studio albums were reissued on CD, cassette, vinyl, digital download and for the first time, streaming, on September 17, 2021. On October 29, 2021, Tank released "I Deserve" from his upcoming tenth and final album R&B Money. The single reached the top 10 on the R&B Radio chart. Tank was nominated, for the first time, for an American Music Award for Favorite Soul/R&B Male Artist, held on November 21, 2021. He lost to The Weeknd. Prior to the release of R&B Money, Tank announced that it would be his final studio album, triggered in part by loss of hearing in his right ear in 2021.

On May 2, 2025, Blackground Records 2.0 released the single "Gone", by Aaliyah, with Tank co-writing the song and adding co-lead vocals. The single was released exclusively to the record label's streaming app, BLKStream, but saw a wider release to streaming and digital download sites on August 1, 2025. "Gone" peaked at number one on the Adult R&B Airplay Chart, and at number 13 on the R&B/Hip Hop Airplay chart. Following widespread criticism from Aaliyah fans regarding the quality of the single, Tank released a statement, writing,

"[The song] featuring myself was supposed to be something good to preserve and continue the legacy of the amazing Aaliyah… This is not it. I’m out [...] The Aaliyah song you are hearing featuring myself, I did out of love for her. I had concerns and I expressed them. From the track to the vocals to the mix and to the visual [...] I still went forward knowing I would at least be able to approve the final products. I haven’t approved one thing you’ve heard or seen [...] Me thinking people had changed was my mistake and I own it [...] Aaliyah deserves better".

On November 18, 2025, Tank released the single "Control". which is set to appear on his upcoming eleventh studio album, Experience, slated for a September 25, 2026 release. An official music video, directed by Daniil Demechev, was released on December 17, 2025.

On April 2, 2026, Tank released the single "Turtleneck"; the single is not expected to be included on the Experience studio album. On July 10, 2026, he released "Yes". The single interpolates Floetry's 2023 single "Say Yes". An official music video, also directed by Denechev, premiered on the same day. On August 28, 2026, he released the third and fourth singles from Experience: "Highlight", which features Charlie Wilson and MK; and "How I Need You", which features Kirk Franklin, Eric Dawkins and Zacardi Cortez.

== Artistry ==
Tank's music is typically soul-rooted R&B. Following his 2012 album This Is How I Feel, his music started to incorporate a more hip-hop sound. His lyrics mostly explore themes of love, relationships, sexuality and emotional expression, often delving into the complexities of romantic relationships. He mentioned Marvin Gaye, Stevie Wonder, Boyz II Men and R. Kelly as his musical inspirations.

=== Writing and producing ===
Tank's songwriting and production credits include working with Aaliyah, Chris Brown, Dave Hollister, Fantasia Barrino, Kelly Rowland, Marques Houston, Omarion, Jamie Foxx, Pitbull, Donell Jones and Monica as a frequent collaborator of the production team the Underdogs and member of his own production team, Song Dynasty.

== Other ventures ==
=== Acting ===
He was a contributor to the score of the film adaptation of the musical Dreamgirls, in which he had a cameo. He was also featured in the movie Preacher's Kid. Tank played Donovan in Born Again Virgin (2015–2016). He also played recording company executive Jheryl Busby in the BET miniseries The New Edition Story (2017), The Bobby Brown Story (2018), and appeared in T.I. & Tiny: Friends & Family Hustle (2018).

In March of 2025, Babbs made his Broadway debut in Hell's Kitchen assuming the role of Davis, previously portrayed by Brandon Victor Dixon. He serves as a limited replacement and featured performer in the production for an 11-week engagement.

Tank is set to play Eric Cropper, an R&B singer and music mogul, in the fourth season of Reasonable Doubt which debuted on October 6, 2026.

=== Podcast ===
Tank and his manager, J. Valentine, are the hosts of their own streaming podcast, R&B Money Podcast, where they interview popular R&B recording artists, songwriters, producers, and other legends of the genre, discussing industry topics with R&B music at its center. The podcast is most popular on the YouTube platform.

== Personal life ==
Tank got engaged to his longtime girlfriend Zena Foster on January 16, 2017. The couple have two children. They were married in Los Angeles, California, on July 22, 2018. Foster is Tank's second wife. He has three more children from previous relationships.

== Discography ==
Studio albums

- Force of Nature (2001)
- One Man (2002)
- Sex, Love & Pain (2007)
- Now or Never (2010)
- This Is How I Feel (2012)
- Stronger (2014)
- Sex Love & Pain II (2016)
- Savage (2017)
- Elevation (2019)
- R&B Money (2022)
- Experience (2026)

Collaborative albums

- Three Kings (with Tyrese and Ginuwine, as TGT) (2013)

== Filmography ==
=== Film ===
Year	Title	Role	Notes
2006	It Ain't Easy	Maggette	Video
2008	KeAnthony: A Hustlaz Story	Jay	Short
2010	Preacher's Kid	Devlin Mitchell	
2014	Second Chance Christmas	Daron Richard	TV movie
2015	November Rule	Paul	
2017	Illicit	Perry	
2018	Me, Myself, & Them	Mr. Jones	Short
2021	Seven Deadly Sins: Lust	Trey Taylor	TV movie
2021	Big 50 - The Delrhonda Hood Story	Slim	
2023	Favorite Son Christmas	Blaine	TV movie
2026	The Gospel of Christmas	Isaac Jefferson	

=== Television ===
Year	Title	Role	Notes
2002	Soul Train	Himself	Episode: "Episode #32.7"
2007	Lyric Cafe	Himself/Celebrity Poet	Episode: "Episode #1.5"
2011	The Protector	Frankie Benson	Episode: "Spoon" & "Affairs"
2012	Single Ladies	Joe Mason	Episode: "No Ordinary Love"
2014	According to Him + Her	Himself	Recurring Guest
2015	Togetherness	Officer	Recurring Cast: Season 1
2015–16	Born Again Virgin	Donovan	Recurring Cast
2017	Unsung	Himself	Episode: "Dave Hollister"
2017	Lip Sync Battle	Himself/Competitor	Episode: "Soul Train Special"
2017	The New Edition Story	Jheryl Busby	Episode: "Part 1-3"
2017	Saints & Sinners	Himself	Recurring Cast: Season 2
2017	Grown Folks	Quincy	Recurring Cast
2018	Hit the Floor	Warren Matthews	Recurring Cast: Season 4
2018	The Bobby Brown Story	Jheryl Busby	Episode: "Part 1 & 2"
2019	Ridiculousness	Himself	Episode: "Tank"
2021	Black Love	Himself	Episode: "How Love Begins"
2022	Real Husbands of Hollywood	Himself	Episode: "Wedding Gone-A-Rye"
2022	Celebrity Game Face	Himself	Episode: "Kevin's BFFs"
2023	A Black Lady Sketch Show	Balthasar	Episode: "I'm Clapping From My Puss"
2023	Urban One Honors	Himself/Host	Main Host
2023	Black Pop: Celebrating the Power of Black Culture	Himself	Episode: "Music"
2026	Reasonable Doubt	Eric Cropper	Main Cast: Season 4

== Stage ==
=== Broadway ===
Year	Title	Role	Notes
2025	Hell's Kitchen	Davis	Replacement / featured performer

== Awards and nominations ==
=== Grammy Awards ===
Year	Recipient	Category	Result	Ref.
2008	Sex, Love & Pain	Best R&B Album	Nominated	
2008	"Please Don't Go"	Best Male R&B Vocal Performance	Nominated	
2011	Take My Time (with Chris Brown)	Best R&B Performance by a Duo or Group with Vocals	Nominated	
2014	Three Kings (with TGT)	Best R&B Album	Nominated	

=== Soul Train Music Awards ===
Year	Recipient	Category	Result	Ref.
2014	Himself	Best R&B/Soul Male Artist	Nominated	

=== International Music Journalism Award ===
Year	Recipient	Category	Result	Ref.
2023	R&B Money Podcast	Best Work of Music Journalism - Multimedia	Nominated	
