= Force of Nature (Tank album) =

Studio album by Tank
- Released: March 13, 2001
- Genre: R&B
- Length: 62:03
- Labels: Blackground; Virgin
- Producers: Barry Hankerson (exec.); Jomo Hankerson (exec.); Bud'da; Jeffrey "J. Dub" Walker; Rapture Stewart; Eric Seats; Caviar & Overdose

Tank chronology
Force of Nature (2001)	One Man (2002)

Singles from Force of Nature
- 1. "Maybe I Deserve" Released: February 10, 2001; 2. "Slowly" Released: May 24, 2001

Force of Nature is the debut studio album by American R&B recording artist Tank. It was released on March 13, 2001 by Blackground Records and Virgin Records. The album debuted atop the US Billboard Top R&B/Hip-Hop Albums chart and debuted at number seven on the US Billboard 200.

== Critical reception ==
Professional ratings
Review scores
Source	Rating
AllMusic	3/5 stars
Entertainment Weekly	C+

Steve Huey of AllMusic rated Force of Nature three out of five stars. He found that "there doesn't seem to be much here that will truly separate Tank from the rest of an already crowded R&B pack, but Force of Nature is well-crafted enough for its Top Ten status to make sense." Entertainment Weekly's Evan Serpick compared Tank's music on Force of Nature with singer D'Angelo: "But while D'Angelo — with his jazz riffs and vocal subtlety — oozes sexy cool, Tank steamrolls listeners with his leaden beats and showy Mariah-esque gyrations."

== Commercial performance ==
Force of Nature debuted and peaked at number 7 on the US Billboard 200 in the week of March 31, 2001, selling 97,000 copies in its first week. It also became Tank's first album to debut at number one on the Top R&B/Hip-Hop Albums chart. Force of Nature has been certified gold by the Recording Industry Association of America (RIAA). By February 2016, it had sold 775,000 copies in United States.

== Track listing ==
Force of Nature track listing
No.	Title	Writer(s)	Producer(s)	Length
1.	"Throw Your Hands Up"	Durrell Babbs; Stephen William Anderson	Bud'da	3:10
2.	"My Freak"	Babbs; Kannon Cross; Elton William Moore	Caviar & Overdose	4:03
3.	"Maybe I Deserve"	Babbs	Tank	5:01
4.	"Can't Get Down"	Rapture Stewart; Durrell Babbs; Eric Seats	Stewart; Seats	5:12
5.	"Designated Driver"	Mosley; Moore; Cross; Babbs	Caviar & Overdose	4:14
6.	"What, What, What"	Babbs; Mosley; Stephen Anderson; Benjamin Bush	Bud'da	3:15
7.	"Lady on My Block"	Babbs; Anderson	Bud'da	4:46
8.	"Street Life"	Babbs; Cross; Moore	Caviar & Overdose	3:41
9.	"Slowly"	Babbs; Jeffrey Walker	J. Dub	6:07
10.	"Kill 4 You"	Rapture Stewart; Babbs; Eric Seats	Stewart; Seats	4:30
11.	"Let It Go"	Babbs; Anderson	Bud'da	3:48
12.	"Bounce & Grind"	Babbs; Walker	J. Dub	5:12
13.	"I Don't Wanna Be Lovin' You"	Babbs; Anderson	Bud'da	4:31
14.	"Maybe I Deserve (Remix)"	Babbs	Bud'da	4:45
Total length:				62:03

== Personnel ==
Credits for Force of Nature adapted from liner notes.

- Tank – Primary Artist, Vocals
- Tank – Track Performer
- Stevie Blacke – Guitar, Strings
- Lorenzo Pryer – Keyboards
- J. Dub – Multi Instruments
- Caviar – Producer, Percussion, Keyboards
- Budda – Keyboards
- Digital Black – Vocals
- Eric Seats – Multi Instruments
- Overdose – Producer
- Paul Riser – Engineer, String Arrangements
- Scott Wolfe – Engineer
- Stewart – Producer
- Bob Tucker – Engineer
- Carlos Warlick – Engineer
- Barry Hankerson – Executive Producer
- Jomo Hankerson – Executive Producer
- Joe Yannece – Mastering
- Storm Jefferson – Engineer
- J. Dub – Programming, Producer
- Michael Conrader – Engineer
- Scotty Beats – Engineer
- Eric Pitts – Engineer
- Budda – Producer, Engineer, Remixing, Keyboards, Mixing
- Wayne Allison – Engineer
- S.A. Anderson – Composer
- Gabe Chiesa – Mixing
- K. Cross – Composer
- Peter DiRado – Assistant Engineer
- Kevin Jackson – Mixing
- Acar S. Key – Mixing
- W. Prince Moore – Composer
- Durrell Babbs – Composer
- Jonathan Mannion – Photography

== Charts ==
=== Weekly charts ===
Weekly chart performance for Force of Nature
Chart (2001)	Peak position
US Billboard 200	7
US Top R&B/Hip-Hop Albums (Billboard)	1

=== Year-end charts ===
Year-end chart performance for Force of Nature
Chart (2001)	Position
US Billboard 200	125
US Top R&B/Hip-Hop Albums (Billboard)	31

== Certifications and sales ==
Certifications of Force of Nature
Region	Certification	Certified units/sales
United States (RIAA)	Gold	775,000

== Release history ==
Release history for Force of Nature
Region	Date	Label	Format(s)	Ref.
United States	March 13, 2001	Blackground Records	CD; cassette; digital download	
Germany	April 27, 2001	Blackground Records	CD; cassette; digital download	
United Kingdom	April 30, 2001	Virgin Records	CD; cassette	
