= Lonny Bereal =

American singer

- Born: Joseph Alonzo Bereal Jr. May 19, 1980 (age 46); Fresno County, California, U.S.
- Genres: R&B, pop, hip hop
- Occupations: Singer; songwriter; record producer
- Years active: 2006–present
- Label: Notifi Music Group
- Formerly of: Flipmode Squad
- Website: lonnybereal.com

Joseph Alonzo "Lonny" Bereal Jr. is an American singer, songwriter, and record producer. His 2011 debut single, "Favor" was a duet with singer Kelly Rowland, for whom he was originally a backing vocalist. Despite the song's commercial underperformance, Bereal shifted focus onto songwriting work for other R&B acts including Ariana Grande, Keri Hilson, Tank, Omarion, Jamie Foxx and Chris Brown—the latter of whom most extensively since 2007. In 2018, he executive produced Snoop Dogg's gospel album Bible of Love, released in March of that year. He was also a member of Busta Rhymes' Flipmode Squad.

== Career ==
Bereal is the cousin of songwriter and producers Charles and Kenneth Bereal. Having started off as a drummer, Bereal got his first break as a background vocalist for John P. Kee, K-Ci & JoJo and Kelly Rowland. He began collaborating as a songwriter with singer Tank on the latter's works, then starting to work as a songwriter and vocal producer with several artists like Chris Brown, Jamie Foxx, Snoop Dogg, Keri Hilson, and Keyshia Cole. In 2007, his credit on Tank's single "Please Don't Go" earned Bereal an ASCAP Award and a Grammy Award nomination. In 2010, he was nominated again for a Grammy Award for Best R&B Song for his contribution on Pleasure P's single "Under".

Bereal became part of the Notifi Music Group, a St. Louis based independent label, in early 2011. His debut album The Love Train includes contributions by Busta Rhymes, Trey Songz, Tank, Chris Brown, and Johnta Austin. The album's first single "Favor", a collaboration with singer Kelly Rowland, was released in May 2011.

== Discography ==
=== Studio albums ===
Title	Album details
The Love Train	Released: March 27, 2012; Label: Notifi Music Group

=== Singles ===
Title	Year	Peak chart positions		Album
Title	Year	US	U.S. R&B	Album
"Favor" (featuring Kelly Rowland)	2011	–	83	The Love Train
