= J. Valentine =

American singer-songwriter

- Born: Johnnie Valentine Newt; July 9, 1979 (age 46); San Francisco, California, U.S.
- Occupations: Singer; songwriter; record producer; podcaster
- Years active: 1990–present
- Label: CityBoyz
- Website: www.jvalentine.com

Johnnie Valentine Newt (born July 9, 1979) is an American R&B singer, songwriter and podcaster from San Francisco, California. He is known for his work with R&B singer Tank, and served as a member of his production group Song Dynasty.

Newt was credited with songwriting work on Tank's singles "When We" and "Emergency", while his credits for other artists include Tyrese's "I Like Them Girls", the title track of NSYNC's album Celebrity (2001), Mario's "How Could You," and Omarion's "I'm Tryna". He guest performed on Tupac Shakur's posthumous albums, Still I Rise (1999) and Until the End of Time (2001).

He began hosting the "R&B Money" podcast in 2022 alongside frequent collaborator Tank. The podcast was nominated for Best Work of Music Journalism - Multimedia at the 2023 International Music Journalism Awards.

== Early life ==
Valentine was born in The Fillmore District of San Francisco, California. As a kid, J. and his brothers would go down to Fisherman's Wharf where they were street performers. J. attended Balboa High School, where he played varsity basketball all four years of high school and AAU along with the likes of NBA players Drew Gooden and Deshawn Stevenson. J. was also seen in Keyshia Cole's debut video "I Changed My Mind" as her love interest. He also worked on her 2010 album Calling All Hearts as a producer and songwriter. Valentine is of African-American and Chinese ancestry. His father was African-American and his mother was Chinese-American.

== Musical career ==
When Valentine was 9 years old, he and his brothers formed the band The Newtrons. In 2009, he founded the CityBoyZ Muzik label and signed hip-hop artist Bailey, and subsequently released the song “Go Dumb” which was originally a record from his Hide Ya Breezy mixtape.

Valentine's 2011 album The Testimony featured artists Keri Hilson, Twista, Gucci Mane and LeToya Luckett. The album accumulated over 17 thousand records sold and reached the iTunes top 10 for R&B/Soul. Valentine recorded “My Girl” with Chris Brown for In My Zone 2.

Valentine's production company, Song Dynasty, includes his brother Bobby Newt, his friend Texx and R&B singer Tank. The team has written and produced songs for artists such as Jamie Foxx, Keyshia Cole, and Ron Isley. In 2010, they produced Now or Never, Tank's first Atlantic Records project. The album's second single, “Emergency,” held the number 5 spot on the Billboard music charts. They wrote the song “Regret” for R&B singer LeToya Luckett featuring Ludacris, which also peaked at #78 on the U.S. Billboard Hot 100 chart and #8 on the Billboard Hot R&B/Hip-Hop Songs chart.

Valentine scored his first #1 single on the R&B charts with Tank in 2022, with the successful single "Slow". The duet song is from Tank's tenth album release, R&B Money.

Valentine and Tank are the hosts of a weekly podcast called R&B Money Podcast, where the two discuss R&B music and other topics with some of the genre's current stars and its greatest legends.

Additionally, Valentine also works as Tank's manager.

== Discography ==
=== Albums ===
Title	Album details
The Testimony	Released: Feb 15, 2011; Label: CityBoyz Muzik; Format: Digital download

=== Mixtape ===
List of mixtapes, with year released
Title	Mixtape details
Hide Ya Breezy	Released: Jan 11, 2006; Label: P.A.I.D.; Format: Digital download
Love & Other Drugs	Released: 14 Feb 2012; Label: CityBoyz Muzik; Format: Digital download
