= Lay It on Me (Kelly Rowland song) =

Single by Kelly Rowland featuring Big Sean

from the album Here I Am
- Released: August 16, 2011
- Recorded: 2010
- Studio: Eyeknowasecret (Brentwood); West Lake (Los Angeles); Studio A (Dearborn Heights); KMA Studios (Paris, France)
- Genre: Hi-NRG; R&B
- Length: 4:03
- Label: Universal Motown
- Songwriters: Ester Dean; Chauncey Hollis; Sean Anderson
- Producer: Hit-Boy

Kelly Rowland singles chronology
| "Favor" (2011) | "Lay It on Me" (2011) | "Down for Whatever" (2011) |

Big Sean singles chronology
| "Marvin & Chardonnay" (2011) | "Lay It on Me" (2011) | "Dance (Ass)" (2011) |

"Lay It on Me" is a song by American singer Kelly Rowland featuring two rap verses from American rapper Big Sean, taken from Rowland's third studio album Here I Am (2011). The contemporary R&B and Hi-NRG song was written by Sean, Ester Dean and Chauncy "Hit-Boy" Hollis who also produced the song. "Lay It On Me" has a piano-driven melody and is laced with 808s and high NRG beats; the lyrics centre on Rowland describing sexual encounters with a lover.

The song was serviced to US rhythmic radio on August 16, 2011 by Universal Motown as the album's second (and last) single in the United States, and later in 2012 as the album's fourth international single. An accompanying music video features interactions with Sean, as well as scenes including Rowland stroking an elephant and dancing with a troupe of black dancers against a white backdrop. It was shot back-to-back with the video for Rowland's third international single, "Down for Whatever", with director Sarah Chatfield and choreographer Frank Gatson, Jr.

Rowland and Sean performed the song live for the first time on Jimmy Kimmel Live! on September 26, 2011. "Lay It On Me" was met with a positive response from music critics who generally praised the sex appeal of the song, progressive production and suggestive lyrics. It has peaked at number 43 one US Hot R&B/Hip-Hop Songs chart and although it did not chart on the Billboard Hot 100, it appeared on the Bubbling Under Hot 100 Singles chart at number 9. Internationally, "Lay It On Me" peaked at both 69 in the UK and Japan.

== Background and composition ==
"First of all, she's amazing. Her energy, she's just so bright. She's just happy. I love making music with people who love what they do… I can tell she really wants this shit too. It was perfect. I love that song too. And she sexy too."

— Big Sean talking to Billboard's column "The Juice" about the collaboration.

Following the success of her previous single "Motivation" (featuring Lil Wayne)," which peaked and remained at number-one on the US Hot R&B/Hip-Hop Songs chart for multiple weeks, Rowland opted to follow up the song with another R&B song titled "Lay It on Me". It features rapper Big Sean and an up-"tempo" melody with a 808s and high NRG-led production that features a "tinkling piano" melody and light R&B beat. Written by Ester Dean, Big Sean and produced by Chauncey "Hit-Boy" Hollis, the lyrics of the song see Rowland tells her man exactly what she wants with lines such as "I wanna just kiss you now, I wanna just touch you now, I wanna just give you all my love tonight." Big Sean follows with equally sexual lines like "The king of California kings/ You gotta call me sire/ Watch me lay it down/ And I ain't even tired." "Lay It on Me" debuted on June 14, 2011, through various online media and websites. The song's producer Hitboy tweeted that the version that had appeared online was an unfinished version. The finished version appeared online on July 17, 2011 featuring an additional verse from Sean. The artwork for the single is taken from the album artwork photoshoot, which was photographed by Derek Blanks with make-up by Latasha Wright and hairstyling by Kimberly Kimble.

== Critical reception ==
"Lay it on Me" received mixed to positive reviews from music critics. A reviewer from the Sydney Star Observer described the song as a "slinky club banger," which was catchy and had the potential to be "another winner" for Rowland. Contessa Gayles was also positive of the song commenting that it had some of the same sentiments as Rowland's 2010 single "Commander", describing "Lay It on Me" as Rowland "coming on strong and telling her man just what she wants in this up-tempo, feelgood love song with just the right amount of sexy." MTV Buzzworthy's Jenna Hally Rubenstein praised the song's "dopeness," stating that Rowland uses "Lay It on Me" to show "how she likes to uhhhh, get down." Rubenstein added that Big Sean's appearance "adds street cred to an otherwise straightforward pop/R&B record." Sputnikmusic's review was favorable, writing that "it's a sleekly produced, midtempo jam that’s just oozing with come-ons and sing-songy moments."

However, not all reception was positive. Ken Capobianco from The Boston Globe felt that "Lay it on Me" was amongst other generic songs on the album. In his review Capobianco said the song did nothing to help Rowland "establish her singularity" as the "diagramed arrangements" were "new iterations of the formula set out for many other female pop and R&B artists." Entertainment Weekly's Adam Markowitz somewhat agreed, calling much of the album "unambitious" but noting "Lay it on Me" as a "cocky comeon." Alison Stewart from The Washington Post said "Lay it on Me" was typical of the "low octane songs" favored on Here I Am. Stewart describes Big Sean's guest appearance as lazy, noting that "nobody seems to be trying particularly hard, especially Big Sean, who sounds like he’s spitting his verse with one eye on the door."

== Music video ==
The music video for "Lay It On Me" was filmed in early September 2011 with British fashion photographer and director Sarah Chatfield. It is the third time that Rowland has worked with Chatfield following the videos for "Forever and a Day" (2010) and "Motivation" (2011). The video for Rowland's next single ("Down for Whatever" featuring The WAV.s) will also be filmed back to back with "Lay it on Me." It was co-directed and choreographed by Frank Gatson, Jr. who also worked with Rowland on "Motivation."

=== Concept ===
Rap-Up.com revealed the first images from the video on September 9, 2011, depicting Rowland in a gold leotard and rapper Big Sean (who is featured on the song) sat in on some gold steps while Rowland lies on the next step up. In another scene, Rowland "commands shirtless male dancers" while dressed in a "skin-bearing leotard" and metal bra. Other scenes include Rowland posing with a foil cape and interacting with an elephant. Entertainment website Idolator described Rowland as getting up close and personal with the hunky male dancers as well as playing with Suzy the baby elephant. Hip Hollywood unveiled some behind the scenes footage on September 8, 2011. Rap-Up magazine revealed further behind the scenes footage from the shoot on September 14, 2011. Rowland's official website posted a sneak peek of the video on September 29, 2011. The full video was released on October 12, 2011.

=== Reception ===
Idolator's Robbie Daw wrote a positive reception, commenting: "There’s plenty of not-so-subtle imagery, such as when Kelly stretches out a Slinky and rubs it all over her body (kids, really don’t try this at home), and her co-star Susie The Elephant takes its trunk and, er, lays it on Rowland. Perfect visual for a sexy song that picks up right where Kelly’s steamy summer hit “Motivation” left off." MTV News's Jocelyn Vena wrote that "Rowland puts her sexuality on full display, wearing several skin-baring bodysuits. The R&B singer shows some sexual swagger as she grinds, rubs and sizes up a bevy of men." A publication of Rap-Up wrote that "the R&B diva piles on more sex as she gets intimate with her half-naked male co-stars (woah der), fondles a slinky, cozies up to an elephant, and flirts with Big Sean."

== Live performances ==
Rowland and Big Sean performed the song on "Jimmy Kimmel Live!" on September 26, 2011. Rowland also performed the song as an opening act for the North American leg of Chris Brown's the F.A.M.E. Tour.

== Credits and personnel ==
Recording information

- Recorded in California at Eyeknowasecret Studio, Brentwood and Westlake Studios, Los Angeles.
- Big Sean's verses were recorded at KMA STUDIOS in New York City.
- Additional vocals were recorded at Studio A Recording Inc, Dearborn Heights, Michigan.

Personnel

- "Big Sean" Anderson – guest rap vocals, songwriter
- Ester Dean – songwriter and vocal production
- Aubry "Big Juice" Delaine – recording and vocal recording engineer
- Jesus Garnica – assistant audio mixer
- Chris Gehringer – audio mastering engineer
- Chauncey "Hit-Boy" Hollis – songwriter, producer, programming
- Jaycen Joshua – audio mixer

== Charts ==
Weekly chart performance for "Lay It on Me"
| Chart (2011) | Peak position |
|---|---|
| Japan (Japan Hot 100) | 69 |
| Netherlands (Urban Top 100) | 37 |
| Romania (Romanian Top 100) | 59 |
| UK Singles (OCC) | 69 |
| UK Hip Hop/R&B (OCC) | 19 |
| US Bubbling Under Hot 100 Singles (Billboard) | 9 |
| US Hot R&B/Hip-Hop Songs (Billboard) | 43 |

== Release history ==
Release dates and formats for "Lay It on Me"
| Region | Date | Format(s) | Label(s) | Ref. |
|---|---|---|---|---|
| United States | August 16, 2011 | Rhythmic contemporary radio | Universal Motown | |
| United States | September 6, 2011 | Urban contemporary radio | Universal Motown | |
| United Kingdom | January 4, 2012 | Contemporary hit radio | Universal Island | |
