= Rose Colored Glasses (Kelly Rowland song) =

Single by Kelly Rowland

from the album Here I Am
- Released: June 28, 2010
- Studio: Conway Recording (Los Angeles, CA); Dr. Luke's Studio (Los Angeles, CA)
- Genre: Electropop
- Length: 4:01
- Label: Universal Motown
- Songwriters: Ester Dean; Lukasz Gottwald
- Producers: Dr. Luke; Emily Wright (vocals)

Kelly Rowland singles chronology
"Commander" (2010)	"Rose Colored Glasses" (2010)	"Grown Woman" (2010)

"Rose Colored Glasses" is a song by American singer Kelly Rowland, recorded for her third studio album, Here I Am (2011). It was written by Ester Dean and Lukasz "Dr. Luke" Gottwald, with lyrics reflecting the different perspectives on relationships and how one can perceive a relationship different from the outside. It opens with an electro-crescendo followed by Rowland's vocals which were produced by Emily Wright; the song's production is based upon layered synths and drums, programmed by Dr. Luke. Dean helped Rowland to record the song, which Rowland said made her cry as it reminded her of her own experiences in past relationships. "Rose Colored Glasses" also had an effect on Rowland's vocals, causing them to swell. The song was serviced to rhythmic and contemporary hit radio on June 29, 2010. Critics praised "Rose Colored Glasses" as one of Rowland's strongest vocal and emotional performances to date.

The arrangement and delivery were praised as being classy, while the critics felt that the overall emotion of the song gave Rowland the best chance of achieving US chart success. "Rose Colored Glasses" was released on June 28, 2010, across some parts of Europe, and a day later in the United States and Canada, where it was intended to be one of the album's two lead singles. An accompanying 3-D concept music video, directed by British fashion photographer John "Rankin" Wadell was released, featuring atmospheric visuals and mood-lit scenes including streamers, doves, and rose petals. Reception for the video was positive, praising its simplicity and noting the stunning visuals and variety of outfits worn by Rowland. The single had limited chart success, entering the top-forty radio airplay charts in Slovakia and the United States, but failing to chart on the US Billboard Hot 100. It is only included on international versions of Here I Am, which was released later in the year than the domestic (US) version of the album.

== Background ==
At the 2010 Winter Music Conference, Rowland confirmed she was ready to release the lead single from her third studio album. On March 29, 2010, during the conference, she debuted the David Guetta-helmed song, "Commander" with her live performance of the song. However, just prior to its release, Rowland's label (Universal Motown) confirmed that the song would only be fully released as a single in international markets. Prior to its release, "Shake Them Haters Off" was replaced by two new songs, one for urban radio and one for contemporary hit radio. "Rose Colored Glasses" was unveiled as the pop lead single, and serviced to both contemporary and rhythmic radio on June 29, 2010. It was also released for digital download on June 29, 2010, in Canada and the United States. The urban single, "Grown Woman", was also serviced to urban, urban adult contemporary and rhythmic radio on June 29, 2010. The album was pushed back into 2011, in which time two other singles to preceded the album – "Forever and a Day" (2010) and "Motivation" (2011).

== Music and recording ==
Kelly Rowland – "Rose Colored Glasses"
A 20-second sample of "Rose Colored
Glass" 's "emotionally-charged" chorus.

“Rose Colored Glasses” is a mid-tempo electro ballad written by Ester Dean and Lukasz "Dr. Luke" Gottwald. The song, which opens with an electro-crescendo followed by Rowland's vocals, has a layered synth production, courtesy of Dr. Luke. In the lyrics, Rowland "explores the subtle ways that perspective can truly change everything...[telling] a story of a relationship that, on the outside, seems troubled." Lizzie Goodwin, from entertainment website Gather.com, called the song an "addition to your break-up/female empowerment playlist." Dean accompanied Rowland in the recording studios when she recorded the song.

During an interview for Rowland's segment in the iHeartRadio concert series, it was revealed that "Rose Colored Glasses" had made Rowland cry. She said “the first time I heard the song it made me think of all of the relationships where I had to wear rose colored glasses,” in particular noting her past “toxic relationships” and “situations where I needed to leave” as the causes of her Rowland's tears. Later it was revealed that the song had made Rowland's vocals swell. During an interview for The Belfast Telegraph, Rowland spoke of the songs she had recorded for her third studio album. When speaking of "Rose Colored Glasses", she said that it had taken its toll on her, “It brought back a few memories, and when I recorded it I cried so much my vocal chords got swollen." She also expressed her pleasure at being able to sing about her experiences.

"It's just so nice to express that emotion and get it all out there because everyone out there, I'm sure you guys can relate to the pain of feeling like a complete idiot when everybody's laughing at you when you're getting played by the person in your life at the time. And you just need to take off your rose colored glasses."

== Critical reception ==
The song was praised by critics who agreed that it was Rowland's best chance of reaching the US Billboard Hot 100 again. They praised both production and vocal delivery of the song. Robbie Daw of Idolator said that, although he "liked the dancability of the Kelly's upbeat tunes," it was "as nice to hear her take on a ballad again." He called the single her best chance of "finally crack[ing] the upper reaches of the Hot 100 once again." Following the video's premier, Daw said that, alongside "Kelly looking stunning in the video," the song had "hit" potential. "Surely the timing is right—especially with all the other singles Dr. Luke has had a hand in dominating the charts—for Rowland to be allowed into the spotlight once more." Lizzie Goodwin of Gather.com agreed that the song, though different from her previous singles, stands on its own as a catchy tune. "Though it’s no 'When Love Takes Over', Kelly Rowland’s latest single and music video 'Rose Colored Glasses' isn’t half-bad. It might not be a dance hit, but her new single is pretty catchy and is a great addition to include in a breakup/girl empowerment playlist." Mack from Sound-Savvy said, "Kelly always makes those love songs that make you re-examine things...While I don’t think Rose Colored Glasses will impact as hard as Commander, it's a formidable single in its own right and I kinda like it." Despite accepting that Rowland has had her moments with the club songs, Melinda Newman of HitFix praised Dr. Luke's production work, stating that "the song is a show stopper (a nice production by him - we often find him too slick)." Jeremy Helligar of True/Slant said that Rowland had done a smart thing by not releasing "Commander" in the United States. He said, "[Rowland's] edgier preference of dance music is very different to the dance-pop that Lady Gaga often tops the charts with." He later added that the song was "still to the left of what normally passes for modern R&B." PopinStereo said that the electro ballad "sounds fresh and breathtaking" thanks to an "amazing production" and "great vocal delivery."

== Release and commercial performance ==
When the single's cover was revealed, it divided opinions. Becky Bain of Idolator liked "simplicity of the black and white cover," though she felt it strange that the image "didn't have color or glasses." Rap-Up magazine thought the opposite to Bain, saying that "Rowland's eyes do the talking with the black-and-white artwork." On June 28, 2010, the single was released as a digital download in Belgium, Norway, and Sweden. A day later, it was sent to American pop and rhythmic radio, as well as released for digital download. On July 23, 2010, it was also released in other parts of Europe, including Italy and the Netherlands. Media Base's seven-day airplay report showed that in the last week of August, "Rose Colored Glasses" managed to peak at number thirty-nine on the US Top 40 Airplay chart, a component of the Mainstream Top 40 chart published by Billboard. However, by the week ending September 11, 2010, it had received no adds to official playlists, despite being played 585 times across thirty-four stations. The only other territory where the song charted was Slovakia. It debuted on the Slovak Airplay Chart at number sixty-eight before peaking at number twenty-five three weeks later.

== Music video ==
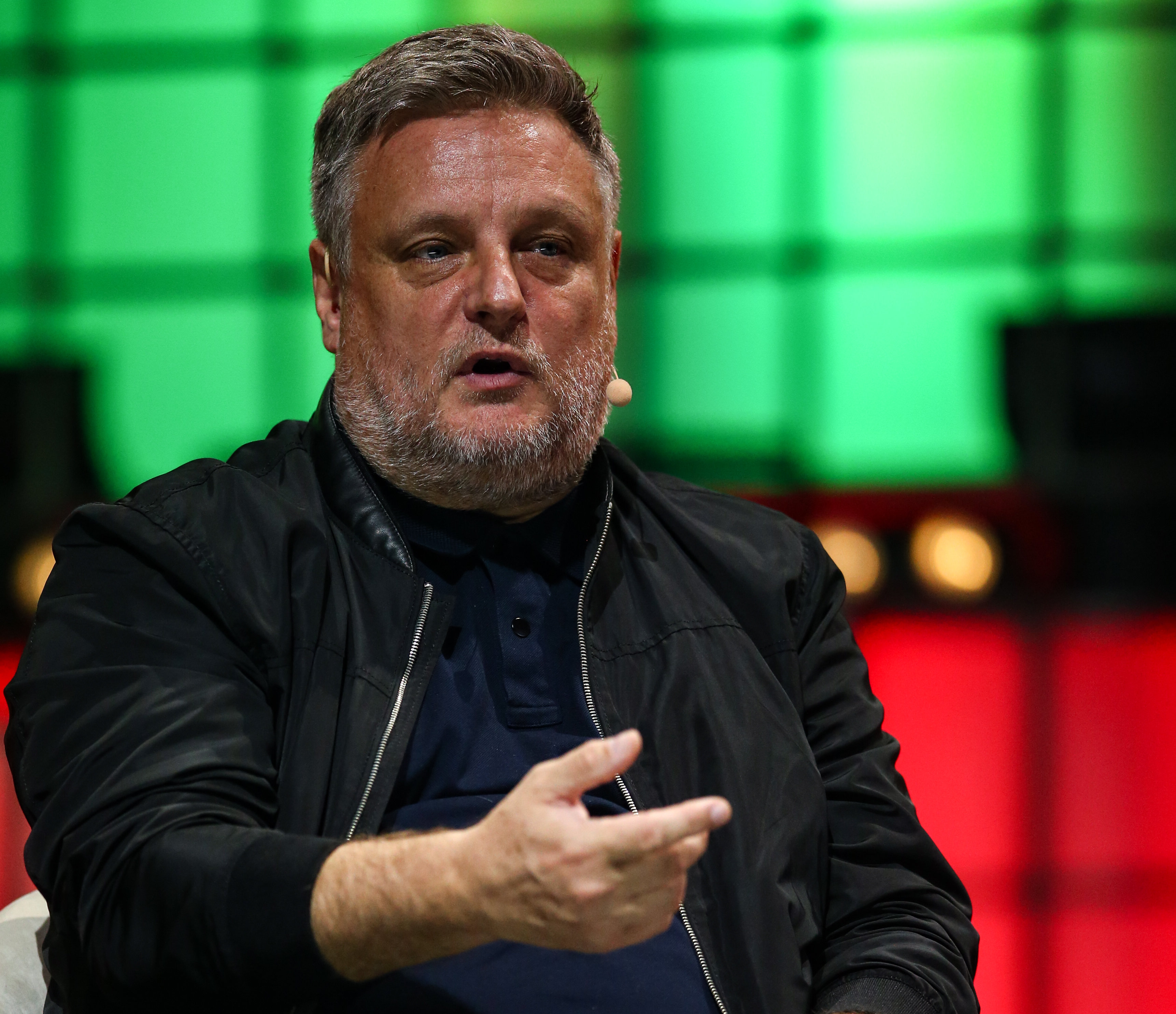
British fashion photographer John "Rankin" Wadell (pictured) directed the music video

=== Background and concept ===
Rowland first revealed on New York's 103.5 KTU FM that the video was due to be filmed in the last week of July 2010. The video shoot began on July 31, 2010. The clip was filmed using 3-D technology and was directed by British fashion photographer John "Rankin" Wadell, whose previous credits include "Say it Right" by Nelly Furtado and "Acapella" by Kelis. Behind-the-scenes footage on Rap-Up TV revealed that the video focuses on the pain of leaving a relationship.

Scenes in the video include vivid colors, unique visuals, and mood-responsive lighting. During the shoot, Rowland said, "This video has been one of the best video experiences I’ve ever had. I’ve shot a lot of videos, but this one is probably the most intriguing because of how it’s shot, the lighting—everything is so detailed." Rankin said that "the concept for the video was 3D" to best portray how "the people look at your relationships with an optimism that can't be seen from the inside." The scenes feature the use of circular trap and turntables so that Rowland "could be seen from every angle." "Rose Colored Glasses" was set to premier on the Vevo network on September 20, 2010; however, it was uploaded to her Vevo account on September 15, 2010, five days earlier than expected.

=== Synopsis ===
At the beginning of the video, Rowland is seen dressed in waist-high trousers, a white blouse, and a black tie. The first scene of the video features Rowland and her love interest, played by Alvino Lewis, arguing. During the song's build-up, she is dressed in a black-and-white netted catsuit, standing in front of pink and red streamers. Just before the chorus, she appears in a low cut corset against a dark backdrop with her hair tied in a tight bun. In the chorus, she appears in a gold dress on a turntable surrounded by smoke, spliced with scenes of the argument and a blue-tinged image of Rowland. As she sings the hook of the song, the camera flicks to a scene where she is surrounded by windswept rose petals (top frame). During the second verse, the blue tinged image of Rowland is seen again, as is a new scene where she is on the turntable again dressed in a black ball gown with frills around the neck and shoulder. This is spliced with more scenes of Rowland in her gold dress. As the chorus builds for a second time, Rowland is seen wearing a tube dress before switching to the dark corset scene where it begins to rain. Rowland is then seen surrounded by white doves (bottom frame) which fly around her while she spins on the circular trap. The bridge of the song focuses on the dark corset scenes where the rain increases and Rowland's facial expressions display deep sadness. Billboard commented on the last scenes: "In the end, Rowland finally takes those 'Rose Colored Glasses' off – the ones that have prevented her from seeing how truly damaging her relationship is – punching through a glass wall before pastel-colored butterflies appear in representation of her breakthrough." The video ends with blue-tinged images, where she sheds a single tear.

=== Reception ===
Critics generally praised the clip's simplicity, the visuals, and the choice of outfits. A reviewer from Rap-Up said, "Kelly Rowland turns her tears into art in the eye-popping video for 'Rose Colored Glasses'..." They focused on the choice of visuals, saying that "the clip shows the Destiny's Child alum struggling with a relationship, while numerous wardrobe changes, vivid colors, doves, and stunning shots of Kelly burst onto the screen." Liz Goodwin of Gather.com agreed with the visuals, saying, "In the music video, Kelly Rowland's body is looking fantastic. (Though she could switch up the weave for another hairstyle.) The outfits are hot – she’s looking fit! Kudos to Kelly for pulling off the very, very low-cut corset without falling out of it! She can be grateful to gravity for still being on her side...and for double-sided tape." Robbie Daw of Idolator said, "We hope two things happen now that Kelly Rowland’s Rankin-directed 'Rose Colored Glasses' music video has premiered: 1.) you like it and show Miss Kelly some love on iTunes, and 2.) radio programmers in this fine country open their ears and show Miss Kelly major love on the airwaves...Kelly looks truly stunning in this video, from the opening shot of her wearing a dress shirt and tie to the couture dresses she vamps in expertly."

Mariel Concepcion of Billboard was also positive of the video, saying that "not only does she walk away from an unhealthy situation in the clip - she looks completely stunning while doing so." A reviewer from Kayrhythm.com said, "The clip is fairly successful, despite its simplicity and sobriety, which probably result from a lack of budget. In the song, Kelly is very beautiful and very emotional because it gives way to sadness created by the decline of a relationship with her boyfriend. In the absence of a spectacular clip, Kelly still focused on her wardrobe, perfect for the occasion." The reviewer pointed out that the video works because of Rowland having a good team behind her. "Kelly's team is really good. Imagine the damage that Kelly could have done with the team of Rihanna!..." Julia Guez of Ados.fr was also critical of the clip, saying, "The aesthetic is the rendezvous, the Destiny's Child alum appears sexier than ever, but why has it increased the costumes? Something is missing...coherence, an imprint? We do not yet see the real Kelly..."

== Promotion ==
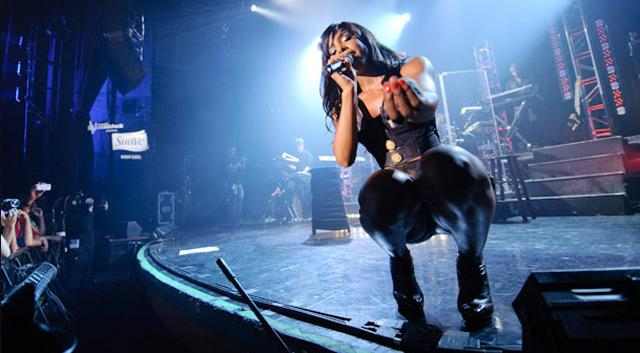
Rowland performing "Rose Colored Glasses" at the Walmart Soundcheck mini-concert

Rowland performed the single live for the first time during the set list of her iHeartRadio concert at P.C. Richard and Son Theater in New York City on August 25, 2010. Entertainment Weekly said that Rowland had recorded "Rose Colored Glasses" in Simlish for The Sims 3: Late Night expansion pack. She reprised her performance of the single at her Walmart-Soundcheck mini-concert.

== Credits and personnel ==
Recording

- Recorded in Los Angeles, California; at Conway Recording Studios and Dr. Luke's.
- Mixed at MixStar Studios in Virginia Beach, Virginia.
- Mastered at Sterling Sound in New York City, New York.

Personnel

- Joshua "Ammo" Coleman – programming
- Ester Dean – songwriter, additional vocals
- Megan Dennis – production coordination
- Serban Ghenea – mixing engineer
- Lukasz "Dr. Luke" Gottwald – songwriter, producer, drums, keyboard, programming
- Tatiana Gottwald – CA assistant
- John Hanes – engineer
- Irene Richter – production coordination
- Tim Roberts – assistant engineer
- Sam Holland – music engineer
- Kelly Rowland – lead vocals
- Eric Weaver – CA assistant
- Emily Wright – vocal producer, music engineer

== Charts ==
Weekly chart performance for "Rose Colored Glasses"
Chart (2010)	Peak position
Slovakia Airplay (ČNS IFPI)	25
South Korea International (Gaon)	28
US Top 40 Airplay (Mediabase)	39 (Note: Mediabase monitors airplay in 180 markets in Canada and the United States. Their US Top 40 Airplay chart is compiled by monitoring weekly rotations on pop, contemporary hit and mainstream radio stations in the US. This is not to be confused with the official Mainstream Top 40 published by Billboard, which tracks rotations through Nielsen BDS.)

== Release history ==
Release dates and formats for "Rose Colored Glasses"
Region	Date	Format(s)	Label(s)	Ref.
Belgium	June 28, 2010	Digital download	Universal Music	
Netherlands	June 28, 2010	Digital download	Universal Music	
Norway	June 28, 2010	Digital download	Universal Music	
Canada	June 29, 2010	Digital download	Universal Music	
United States	June 29, 2010	Contemporary hit radio; digital download; rhythmic contemporary radio	Universal Motown	
Italy	July 26, 2010	Digital download	Universal Music	
