= Motivation (Kelly Rowland song) =

2011 single by Kelly Rowland

Single by Kelly Rowland featuring Lil Wayne

from the album Here I Am
- Released: March 4, 2011
- Recorded: 2010
- Studio: Circle House (Miami)
- Genre: R&B; electropop
- Length: 3:51
- Label: Universal Motown
- Songwriters: Dwayne Carter; James Scheffer; Danny Morris; Rico Love
- Producers: Jim Jonsin; Rico Love

Kelly Rowland singles chronology
"Gone" (2011)	"Motivation" (2011)	"What a Feeling" (2011)

Lil Wayne singles chronology
"I'm Into You" (2011)	"Motivation" (2011)	"Red Nation" (2011)

"Motivation" is a song recorded by American recording artist Kelly Rowland for her third studio album Here I Am (2011). The song was written by Jim Jonsin, Rico Love, Daniel Morris and Lil Wayne, with Jonsin producing the song and Lil Wayne having featured vocals. The R&B slow jam was released as the fourth single from Here I Am on March 4, 2011, by Universal Motown Records.

Upon release, "Motivation" received favorable reviews from critics generally praising the sexiness of the song. Official remixes were produced for the song, including a dubstep-inspired electronic mix by Diplo and a rap remix by Busta Rhymes, Trey Songz and Fabolous.

In the United States, the song has peaked at number one on the Hot R&B/Hip-Hop Songs chart where it stayed seven weeks in a row, and number seventeen on the Billboard Hot 100, becoming Rowland's second US top 20 hit (fourth top 30 overall) and her second highest performing single to date as a solo artist, behind "Dilemma". It was certified double platinum by the RIAA in May 2013.

An accompanying music video was directed by Sarah Chatfield, the director behind Rowland's previous video "Forever and a Day" (2010). It follows a number of sultry scenes where Rowland dances seductively amongst partially dressed dancers in a dimly-lit warehouse, with the entire video tinged in blue light. "Motivation" was nominated for the Grammy Award for Best Rap/Sung Collaboration at the 54th Grammy Awards. Rowland sang the song with Trey Songz at the 2011 BET Awards ceremony.

== Background and release ==
Here I Am was originally scheduled for release in 2010, but was pushed back numerous times. Initially the dance-influenced "Commander" served as the album's lead single for international territories while two separate singles were serviced in the United States. "Rose Colored Glasses" for the pop format and "Grown Woman" for the urban format. Rowland decided in September 2010 to re-enter the recording studios to work on new material for the album. This, coupled with creative issues such as naming the album, led to multiple pushbacks. "Motivation" was announced as the title for the album's new lead single during New York Fashion Week. It debuted online via Rap-Up magazine's website on March 2, 2011.

Speaking of how the record came about, Rowland said "Motivation came about when I was in the studio with [producers] Jim Jonsin and Rico Love, and we kind of were just vibing. I told Rico I wanted something really sexy ... and he came up with 'Motivation' along with Jim. It turned into this amazing record... I played [ 'Motivation' for Lil Wayne ] and he got on it, and it was just as simple as that." Along with the single announcement, Rap-Up said fans could expect the video and a remix produced by Diplo to premiere in April 2011. However, the electronic remix, produced by Diplo, premiered via Rap-Up on March 8, 2011.

== Composition ==
"Motivation" (2011)
A 23-second sample of "Motivation", backed by slow R&B beats. The lyrics of the song, described as "racy" sees Rowland asking her partner to move his hands over her body.

"Motivation" is an R&B slow jam and electropop song written by Richard Butler (Rico Love), Jim Jonsin, Dwayne Carter and Danny Morris. The racy lyrics center around Rowland asking her man to use his hands all over her body, and are accompanied by a "synth-saturated beat" produced by Jonsin. In terms of instruments, "Motivation" uses sparse keyboard notes, programmed beats and pulsing synths in the chorus. The song has a medium tempo of 140 beats per minute. Wayne adds a rap verse complementing Rowland's seductive suggestions, using the kitchen and a car as metaphors for sex. According to Scott Shetler from AOL Music, Rowland uses the lyrics to promise "to be her lover's motivation."

Rowland called the record a mixture between dance and mash-up. When asked by MTV what Rowland thought of the song, she said,"It has that personality and characteristic to it that I don't think anybody can deny. That's why when Wayne dropped that insane verse on there ... I was like, 'You really brought that up even more.' He went into the studio and just did it. I don't think it takes much for Wayne to think. He just does it. He's so admirable."

== Critical reception ==
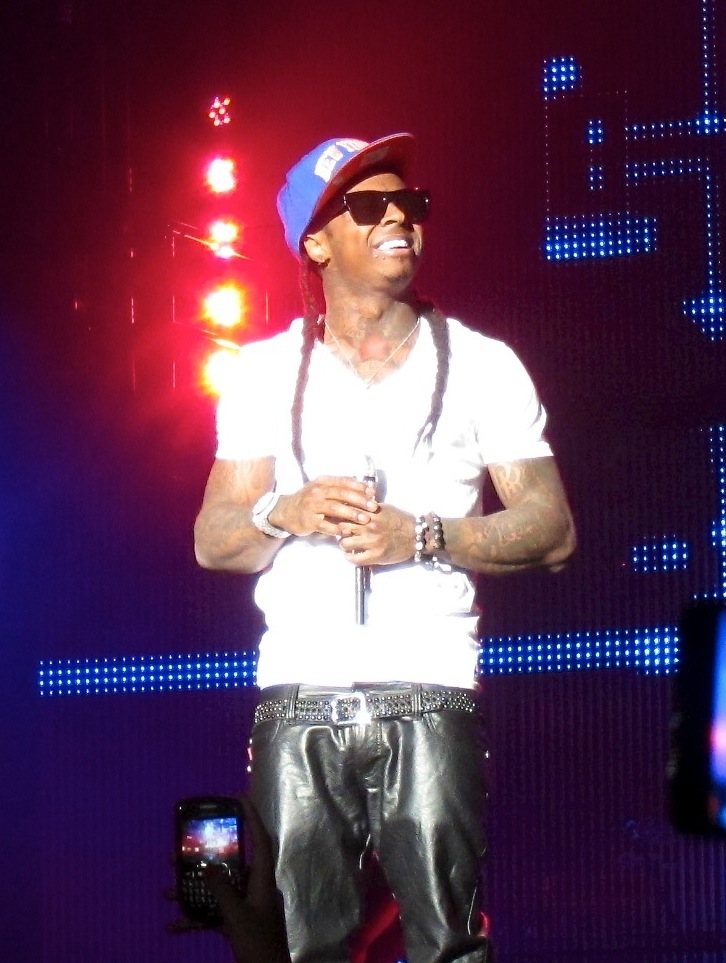
Lil Wayne (pictured) is featured on the single, and his verse received positive reviews.

Ryan Brockington, from the New York Post, was amongst the first to review "Motivation." In his review, he said "The single is a big leap from the dance club synth pop that Kelly has been releasing the past year and it seems like she might be trying to shimmy her way back into the hip-hop world by teaming up with the Midas touch vocals of Lil Wayne." Both Rap-Up and AOL Music's Scott Shetler called the song "sexy." Becky Bain from Idolator disliked the song for not being memorable. The short review was summed up with the closing phrase, "she's going to need another hit to help promote her album when it finally is ready to drop."

Mikey Fresh of Vibe said that Rowland readies the song with "just a touch of sensuality". Wesley Case from The Baltimore Sun complimented the song's sexy quality. "If this isn't the year's hands-down sexiest song thus far, it has to be in the discussion. Rowland, whose sultry voice could get a priest hot, weaving in and out of the minimal beat, and setting the table for Lil Wayne's stuttering, after-hours guest-verse. Stack the pieces together and it's an understated knockout that gets sexier with each spin."

Shahryar Rizvi of Dallas Observer felt that the song was a "female-fronted counterpart" to the smooth, slow-tempo R&B vibe that R. Kelly and Trey Songz usually proffer. Nathan Slavik of Billboard ranked it number five on their "Critics' Picks: 20 Best Songs of 2011". Rap-Up ranked "Motivation" number 6 on their year-end best songs list for 2011.

"Motivation" was nominated for two awards at the 2011 Soul Train Music Awards including Best Dance Performance and Song of the Year. It won the award for Song of the Year and was also nominated for the Grammy Award for Best Rap/Sung Collaboration at the 54th Grammy Awards, which was held on February 12, 2012.

In 2019, The Associated Press named the song number 2 out of 25 songs listed as a part of its "Top songs of the decade".

=== Accolades ===
Publication	Accolade	Rank
Slate	Best Songs of 2011	2
Esquire	Best Pop Songs of 2011	4
Billboard	20 Best Songs of 2011	5
NPR	NPR Music's 100 Favorite Songs Of 2011	6
Rap-Up	Best Songs of 2011	6
Soul Bounce	Hot 16: Best Songs Of 2011	8
LiveAbout	Top 100 Best Pop Songs Of 2011	30
Pitchfork	The Top 100 Tracks of 2011	79

== Chart performance ==
Despite not being released for digital download until April 13, 2011, "Motivation" made its US chart debuted on April 2, debuting at number fifty-five on the Hot R&B/Hip-Hop Songs chart. In the weeks following it continued to rise thanks to urban airplay, eventually reaching number one in its tenth week on the chart, chart dated May 23, 2011. "Motivation" is Rowland's first solo number one as lead artist on a US Billboard composite chart (one combining airplay and sales), although she previously peaked at number one with Nelly on his 2002 single "Dilemma." It stayed at the top spot of the chart for six more weeks. In the same week that "Motivation" hit number one on the Hot R&B/Hip-Hop Songs chart, Lil Wayne, who is featured on the single, had a total of twelve songs on the chart.

Following its release, "Motivation" debuted on the Billboard Hot 100 at number fifty-five, Rowland's highest Hot 100 debut as a solo artist. It reached number seventeen, Rowland's highest Hot 100 peak as a solo artist, and best chart position since "Dilemma" (by Nelly featuring Kelly Rowland −2002), which reached number one. The song also peaked at number twenty-five on the Digital Song Sales chart and spent twenty-six weeks on there. Additionally, it is the first single from Rowland to chart on the Hot 100 since her 2009 feature on David Guetta's "When Love Takes Over", which reached number seventy-six. The previous two lead singles, "Grown Woman" (2010) and "Rose Colored Glasses" (2010), from Here I Am, failed to enter the Hot 100, though the latter peaked at number fifty-one on the Hot R&B/Hip-Hop Songs chart. The producer of "Motivation", Jim Jonsin, said he was proud and confident of the song's success. "I'm really happy that things are going well for her on this record. A real concern for us was to get that smash for her... She's a friend of ours as well, so to see her win is huge." Furthermore, "Motivation" reached the top ten in other Billboard component charts, peaking at number three on the Hot Ringtones chart, number ten on the Radio Songs chart and number one on the Hot 100 Recurrents chart.

== Music video ==
One of the blue light-shaded scenes from the video, where Kelly Rowland sings seductively, while other people get romantic in the background.

The music video for "Motivation" was directed by Sarah Chatfield, at the end of March 2011. Frank Gatson served as the video's choreographer.

Speaking during Roberto Cavalli's fashion show, Rowland said she was on the look out for "womanly, sexy designs" for a "feminine sexy video." She elaborated on the development of the video during an interview when MTV News' Jocelyn Vena. She told Vena, "We came up with the energy, and with Frank [Gatson] — and I don't know how he sees something, but he got it... I'm so thankful I have a great team that's thinking 10 steps ahead of me. With Sarah she understood; she got the concept. It was great the way everything came together." The video made its world premiere on BET's 106 & Park on April 4, 2011.

The video opens in a blue-colored hue lit warehouse, with Rowland standing in the passageway before it cuts to her walking through the building checking out the ladies and men mingling. Rowland can then be seen in a purple swimsuit & coat, doing different sexual choreography routines with her many half-dressed male backup dancers. The clip then shows Lil Wayne in his own scene rapping his verse to the song. He can then be seen leaning against a wall and standing on a bed with the lights flashing while Rowland is simultaneously being entertained by a male dancer as she sits upon a chair.

The video then continues with the crowd entwining with each other; full make out sections between females and their male counterparts, as well as half-dressed males feeling on each other's bodies, while the females also interact with each other. After more dancing from Rowland and her dancers, the video then ends with Rowland singing her last lines, surrounded by the sexually charged crowd. Jocelyn Vena of MTV commented that the video "plays to the song's sexy themes."

== Remixes ==
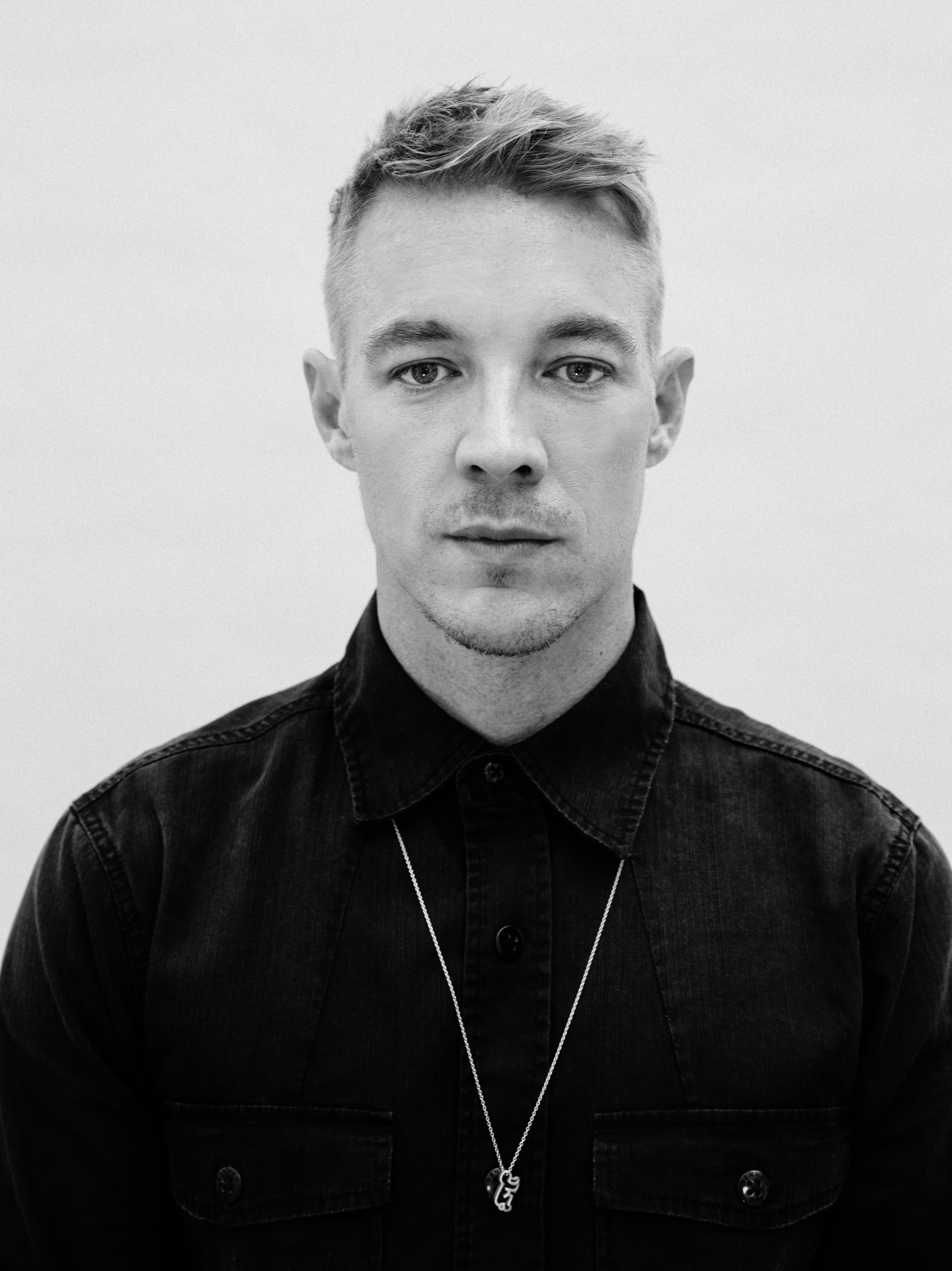
EDM DJ/producer Diplo produced one of the song's official remixes, featured on the international version of the album

"Motivation" has been remixed several times, mainly by Rowland's fellow R&B contemporaries who have each put their own angle on the song. The first remix, the song's official remix, was helmed by electronic music producer Diplo. It replaces some of the song's original instruments with electronic ones, as well as adding "rapid hi-hats". Diplo also modifies Rowland's vocals, by "chopping and reconfiguring" them "over the dubstep-inspired instrumental."

A So So Def remix of the song features female American rapper Da Brat. The unofficial remix, features a new introduction from Da Brat, and was released online to Rap-Up. R&B singers The-Dream and Jeremih also made remixes of the song, adding their own verses and "male perspective" to complement Rowland and Lil Wayne's verses.Tyga also released a remix for his Mixtape "Well Done 2" entitled "Pussy Talkin'.

In May 2011, R. Kelly joined the list of singers to create their own remix for "Motivation". In his version, R. Kelly adds additional verses and references his own songs such as "Pregnant". R. Kelly's remix of the song was praised by Rowland. Using her official Twitter account, Rowland said, "R. Kelly Motivation Remix is CRAAAZZZZZY!!!" R&B singer Mario also added his vocals to a remix of the song. On June 6, 2011, a second official remix for the song was uploaded. It replaces Lil Wayne with new verses from rappers Busta Rhymes, Trey Songz and Fabolous. Rhymes has a rapid-fire "bedroom"-themed verse, while Songz sings in his falsetto and Fabolous' verse is cut short by the re-introduction of Rowland's vocals. A third officially produced remix, the "Rebel Rock Remix", features on the deluxe edition of Here I Am.

== Live performances ==
On June 26, 2011, Rowland took to the stage of the 2011 BET Awards to perform "Motivation" for the first time in public. The performance was part of the evening's entertainment; the song was not nominated for an award. Hollywood News reported that Rowland was among the most anticipated performers of the evening. Appearing in the middle of Trey Songz performance of "Love Faces," Rowland ascended on stage where she was joined by several shirtless male dancers. The performance was met with a positive reception from industry critics and fellow music entertainers, most of whom noted it as a highlight of the ceremony. Ed Masley from The Arizona Republic said that Rowland's performance was "the night's most soulful vocal [performance]." Roger Catlin said that Rowland offered "a live performance with Trey Songz trumping that of her more famous 'sister' from Destiny's Child, Beyoncé." The Los Angeles Times' Gerrick D. Kennedy praised Rowland's sex appeal, noting that her "steamy performance sent tongues wagging" and was widely anticipated thanks to the serial delays with her album Here I Am (2011). MTV Rob Markman pointed out that following her performance, the hashtag "#kelly" began trending on Twitter. Additionally Markman said Rowland "received one of the loudest ovations of the night."

Rowland performed the song on Jimmy Kimmel Live! on September 27, 2011. Rap-Up described Rowland's performance on the show as a "sizzling performance". Robbie Daw of Idolator praised Rowland's performance and said that the "black-clad diva rocked out two sexy jams from Here I Am" and later described her performance as "sultry". Rowland performed the song during her guest appearance on The Wendy Williams Show on June 24, 2013 along with "Kisses Down Low" and "Street Life".

== Track listings and formats ==
- Digital download
1. "Motivation" (featuring Lil Wayne) – 3:51
- Digital download (remix)
1. "Motivation" (Diplo Remix) – 3:56
- Streaming (rap remix)
1. "Motivation" (featuring Busta Rhymes, Fabolous and Trey Songz) – 4:34
- Rebel Rock Remix (album only)

13. "Motivation" (Rebel Rock Remix) (featuring Lil Wayne) – 3:41

- Digital EP
1. "Motivation" (featuring Lil Wayne) – 3:51
2. "Motivation" (Diplo Remix) – 3:57
3. "Motivation" (music video) – 4:22

== Credits and personnel ==
Recording

- Recorded and mixed at Circle House Recording Studios in Miami, Florida
- Mastered at Sterling Sound in New York City, New York

Personnel

- Jim Jonsin – songwriter, producer, programming, keyboards
- Rico Love – songwriter
- Daniel Morris – songwriter, keyboards
- Dwayne Carter – songwriter, featured rap vocals
- Thurston McCrea – recording
- Sean McCoy – recording assistant, mixing assistant
- Robert Marks – additional recording, mixing
- Matt Huber – mixing assistant
- Chris Gehringer – mastering

== Awards and nominations ==
Year	Awards ceremony	Award	Results	Ref
2011	MP3 Music Awards	Music Industry Choice Award	Nominated	
2011	Soul Train Music Awards	Best Dance Performance	Nominated	
2011	Soul Train Music Awards	Song of the Year	Won	
2012	Billboard Music Awards	Top R&B Song	Won	
2012	Grammy Awards	Best Rap/Sung Collaboration	Nominated	

== Charts ==
=== Weekly charts ===
Chart (2011–12)	Peak position
Australia Urban (ARIA)	36
Belgium (Ultratip Bubbling Under Wallonia)	33
Canada Hot 100 (Billboard)	99
Hungary (Single Top 40)	10
Netherlands Urban (MegaCharts)	20
South Korea International (Gaon)	65
UK Singles (OCC)	166
UK Hip Hop/R&B (Official Charts)	38
US Billboard Hot 100	17
US Dance Airplay (Billboard)	21
US Hot R&B/Hip-Hop Songs (Billboard)	1
US Adult R&B Songs (Billboard)	6
US Pop Airplay (Billboard)	24
US Rhythmic Airplay (Billboard)	4

=== Year-end charts ===
Chart (2011)	Position
US Billboard Hot 100	53
US Hot R&B/Hip-Hop Songs (Billboard)	2
US Rhythmic (Billboard)	16

=== Decade-end charts ===
Chart (2010–2019)	Position
US Hot R&B/Hip-Hop Songs (Billboard)	12

== Certifications and sales ==
Region	Certification	Certified units/sales
Brazil (Pro-Música Brasil)	Gold	30,000^{‡}
New Zealand (RMNZ)	Platinum	30,000^{‡}
South Korea	—	21,660
United Kingdom (BPI)	Silver	200,000^{‡}
United States (RIAA)	2× Platinum	2,000,000^{‡}
^{‡} Sales+streaming figures based on certification alone.

== Release history ==
Release dates and formats for "Motivation"
Region	Date	Version(s)	Format(s)	Label(s)	Ref.
United States	March 2, 2011	Original	Streaming	Universal Motown	
United States	March 8, 2011	Diplo remix	Streaming	Universal Motown	
Switzerland	April 8, 2011	Original; Diplo remix	Digital download	Universal Music	
United States	April 9, 2011	Original	Urban contemporary radio	Universal Motown	
Belgium	April 11, 2011	Original; Diplo remix	Digital download	Universal Music	
Finland	April 11, 2011	Original; Diplo remix	Digital download	Universal Music	
France	April 11, 2011	Original; Diplo remix	Digital download	Barclay	
Sweden	April 11, 2011	Original; Diplo remix	Digital download	Universal Music	
Canada	April 12, 2011	Original; Diplo remix	Digital download	Universal Music	
United States	April 12, 2011	Original; Diplo remix	Digital download	Universal Motown	
Netherlands	April 15, 2011	Original; Diplo remix	Digital download	Universal Music	
Norway	April 15, 2011	Original; Diplo remix	Digital download; digital download (EP)	Universal Music	
Italy	April 18, 2011	Original; Diplo remix	Digital download	Universal Music	
Austria	April 19, 2011	Original; Diplo remix	Digital download	Universal Music	
Germany	April 19, 2011	Original; Diplo remix	Digital download	Universal Music	
Netherlands	April 22, 2011	Original; Diplo remix	Digital download (EP)	Universal Music	
Switzerland	April 22, 2011	Original; Diplo remix	Digital download (EP)	Universal Music	
Italy	April 26, 2011	Original; Diplo remix	Digital download (EP)	Universal Music	
Ireland	May 13, 2011	Original; Diplo remix	Digital download	Universal Music	
United Kingdom	May 15, 2011	Original; Diplo remix	Digital download	Universal Island	
United States	July 19, 2011	Original	Contemporary hit radio	Universal Motown	

== See also ==
- List of number-one R&B singles of 2011 (U.S.)
