= Grown Woman =

Grown Woman may refer to:

- Adult females
- "Grown Woman" (Kelly Rowland song), 2010
- "Grown Woman" (Beyoncé song), 2013
