= Down for Whatever =

Single by Kelly Rowland featuring The WAV.s

from the album Here I Am
- Released: October 26, 2011
- Studio: Henson Studios (Los Angeles, California)
- Genre: Dance-pop; eurodance
- Length: 3:55
- Label: Universal Motown
- Songwriters: Nadir Khayat; Teddy Sky; Jimmy Joker; Bilal Hajji
- Producers: RedOne; Jimmy Joker; The WAV.s

Kelly Rowland singles chronology
"Lay It on Me" (2011)	"Down for Whatever" (2011)	"Summer Dreaming 2012" (2012)

The WAV.s singles chronology
"I Like How It Feels" (2011)	"Down for Whatever" (2011)

"Down for Whatever" is a song by American recording artist Kelly Rowland featuring production collective The WAV.s, taken from Rowland's third studio album Here I Am (2011). The song was released on October 26, 2011. The Eurodance driven up-tempo song is the album's third international single and sixth overall and final single, released from October 26, 2011, by Universal Motown and Universal Music. "Down for Whatever" was written by Teddy Sky and Bilal Hajji and co-written and produced by RedOne, Jimmy Joker and The WAV.s. The song has been described as a Eurodance and Electro music. The song received mostly positive reviews from music critics, who say that the song is as catchy as Rowland's previous dance hits, "When Love Takes Over" and "Commander". It was also described as a "Radio friendly song".

"Down for Whatever" charted at number-six in the UK singles chart and number-three on the UK Dance Chart. With the release of the single, an accompanying music video was directed by Sarah Chatfield, which features Rowland dancing and a number of different club lights, as the song is a club-dance song and was released on October 19, 2011. To promote the song, Rowland performed the song on The Graham Norton Show, The X Factor on which Rowland served as a judge and the German version of the show.

== Background and composition ==
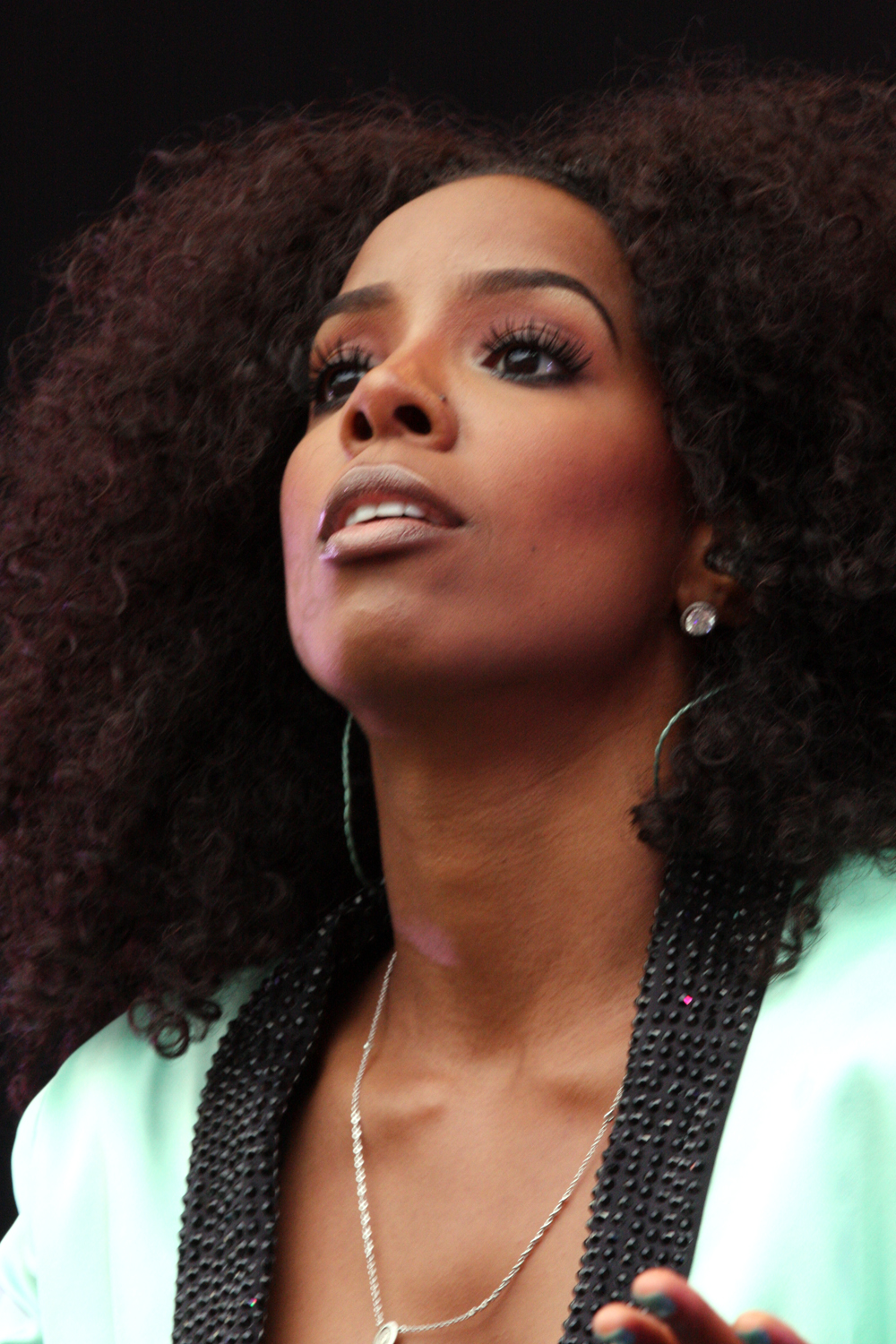
Kelly Rowland performing in Sydney, Australia in 2012.

"Down for Whatever" was written by Nadir Khayat, Teddy Sky, Jimmy Joker, Bilal Hajji. Production was handled by RedOne, Joker, and The WAV.s. The song is a eurodance song with electro music influences. Built on a thumping beat and a pounding groove, Rowland later visited Henson Recording Studios in Los Angeles, California where "Down For Whatever" was recorded and the production was created. the song's instrumentation includes vigorous synthesizers. Before recording the song, Rowland said she wanted the whole album to be a distinctly different sound to both her previous albums; Simply Deep (2002) followed a rock–dance sound, while Ms. Kelly (2007) featured an urban sound. Rowland stated there was going to be a lot more up-tempo tracks, which guided her towards recording "Down for Whatever".

When recording the album, Rowland specifically noted that US and international audiences would appreciate a different sound from her album. The more up-tempo and dancier tracks were reserved for the international markets. "Down for Whatever" was only released to countries outside of North America. It was later announced that Rowland would join the judging panel of the eighth series of The X Factor.

On many occasions, Rowland has always expressed her love for dance music, however she said that the music would not be the type of music she would record. In 2008, she met David Guetta, and the pair became friends and later in 2009, and Rowland released her first dance single, "When Love Takes Over". When Rowland began recording her third album, Here I Am, her record label, Columbia Records was not very enthusiastic about dance music, although Rowland was very keen to record dance genre. This made Rowland depart from her record label and she later joined Universal Motown Records in 2009. After the successful release of "Commander" Rowland decided to continue creating dance music for her upcoming third studio album. In February 2011, during New York Fashion Week, Rowland confirmed that she also had sessions arranged with RedOne, which led to the conception of the album's tenth song, a Eurodance song called "Down for Whatever," co-produced by The WAV.s and Jimmy Joker.

== Release ==
"Down for Whatever" was picked by Universal Mowton Records as the third international single from the album, following the success of dance song "Commander". The single's release date was decided with Rowland's role as a judge on The X Factor with an increase of sales in Rowland's music, her record label thought it would be a good promotional stunt for the single if Rowland performed the song live on the eighth series. The single was released on October 26, 2011, and Rowland did not perform the song the day the song was performed, which sparked speculation that producers of the shows had refused Rowland to perform the song, however, she performed it the week after the release." Rowland stated the song was considered as the first single from her debut album, Here I Am. However, she decided to release "Commander" first. The song was not released as a single in the United States, however it was in the original track listing for the US version of the album. "Down for Whatever" was released in New Zealand and Australia on October 26, 2011, in Germany on November 4, 2011, and was released as a digital download in the UK on November 20, 2011.

== Critical reception ==
Andy Kellman from AllMusic wrote that "Down for Whatever" is a more frictional Eurodance number than "Commander", concluding that the former deserves the same commercial performance as the latter, which topped the club charts in the UK and US. Elyssa Garnder from USA Today noted on "Down for Whatever", Rowland parties like she did in 2009 on the collaboration with French producer David Guetta, "When Love Takes Over". Nathan S. of DJ Booth described "Down for Whatever" as a "club-focused leaning", adding that though it is not exactly groundbreaking, it delivers exactly what the genre demands. Nick Levine BBC Music wrote that "Down for Whatever" suggests that Rowland's future could lie as "a kind of dance diva with street". Sputnikmusic's was positive, but ultimately complaining that the album has less of the dance diva persona, reducing the club-centric tracks to only two songs, the Guetta-produced 'Commander' and the quite underwhelming 'Down For Whatever'."

Ken Capobianco from The Boston Globe stated the sentiment behind the groove of the song should have been taken more seriously. Michaelangelo Matos from the Los Angeles Times added that by the time Here I Am ends with "the stomping Euro-cheese 'Down for Whatever', with lyrics as shrugged-off as the title, it's hard not to want to find Rowland a life coach". Slant Magazine's Jesse Cataldo wrote that the song "masks the falseness of the forced sexuality" by burying Rowland's voice in the song's instrumentation. Hermione Hoby of The Guardian viewed "Down for Whatever" as generic and "abjectly titled". Andy Gill of The Independent wrote that the lack of inspiration on Here I Am is nowhere better conveyed than on "Down for Whatever".

== Chart performance ==
"Down for Whatever" debuted at number six on the UK singles chart, making it her eighth song to appear in the top ten in the UK. The following week, Rowland performed on The X Factor which she served as a judge on. The following week, the single fell to number nine on the UK singles chart. The song also charted at number-three on the UK Dance Chart. Following the performance on The X Factor the song also charted at number 16 on the Irish Singles Chart. Before completing her role as a judge on UK version of The X Factor, Rowland flew to Germany to perform at the final of the German version of the program with finalist, Raffaela Wais, where the pair performed "When Love Takes Over" she later performed as a celebrity guest performing "Down for Whatever" and the song charted at number 31 on the German Singles Chart.

== Music video ==
Rowland in the music video for "Down for Whatever" while laying on a platform.

The music video was directed by Sarah Chatfield and was filmed back-to-back with single, "Lay It on Me" in early September 2011. A music video to accompany the release of "Down for Whatever" was first released on October 18, 2011. It was uploaded to YouTube on October 19, 2011, at a total length of four minutes and four seconds. It has drawn in over 8 million viewers on YouTube since its release. The music video starts with club lights flashing and the camera focused on Rowland's heels, before following Rowland's hands up her legs to her body. Standing on a big platform in the middle of an empty room, while on the platform, Rowland poses in many different dance moves, before the song's verse begins. Then there is shots of chains around her face and body and then back-up dances are seen dancing in front of a screen, and later Rowland is seen dancing with the back-up dancers. Rowland is then seen again, with a top hat on, singing into the camera, while wearing a swimsuit.

== Track listing ==
- CD single
1. "Down for Whatever" (Album Version) – 3:55
2. "Down for Whatever" (Max Sanna & Steve Pitron Remix – Edit) – 4:00
- Digital download
1. "Down for Whatever" (Album Version) – 3:53
2. "Down for Whatever" (True Tiger Remix) – 3:56
3. "Down for Whatever" (Max Sanna & Steve Pitron Remix – Edit) – 3:59
4. "Down for Whatever" (DJ Chuckie Remix) – 3:50

== Credits and personnel ==
Recording

- Recorded at Henson Recording Studios in Los Angeles, California.
- Mixed at 2101 Studios in Los Angeles, California.
- Mastered at Sterling Sound, New York City, New York.

Personnel

- RedOne – songwriter, producer, recording, engineering, instrumentation, programming and vocal arrangement
- Teddy Sky – songwriter
- Jimmy Joker – songwriter, producer, instrumentation and programming
- Bilal "The Chef" – songwriter
- The WAV.s – producer, instrumentation, programming and spoken vocals
- AJ Junior – recording, engineering
- Trevor Muzzy – recording, engineering and mixing
- Chris Gehringer – mastering

== Charts ==
=== Weekly charts ===
Chart (2011)	Peak position
Belgium (Ultratip Bubbling Under Flanders)	60
Germany (GfK)	31
Ireland (IRMA)	16
Romania (Romanian Top 100)	64
Scottish Singles Sales (Official Charts)	5
Slovakia Airplay (ČNS IFPI)	20
Switzerland (Schweizer Hitparade)	62
UK Singles (Official Charts)	6
UK Dance (Official Charts)	3

=== Year-end charts ===
Chart (2011)	Position
UK Singles (OCC)	159

== Certifications ==
Certifications and sales for "Down for Whatever"
Region	Certification	Certified units/sales
United Kingdom	—	177,000

== Release history ==
Release dates and formats for "Down for Whatever"
Region	Date	Format(s)	Label(s)	Ref.
United Kingdom	September 12, 2011	Contemporary hit radio	Universal Island	
Australia	October 31, 2011	Contemporary hit radio	Universal Music	
Austria	November 4, 2011	Digital download (EP)	Universal Music	
Germany	November 4, 2011	Digital download (EP)	Universal Music	
Ireland	November 18, 2011	Digital download (EP)	Universal Music	
Norway	November 18, 2011	Digital download (EP)	Universal Music	
Switzerland	November 18, 2011	Digital download (EP)	Universal Music	
Belgium	November 20, 2011	Digital download (EP)	Universal Music	
Finland	November 20, 2011	Digital download (EP)	Universal Music	
Italy	November 20, 2011	Digital download (EP)	Universal Music	
Luxembourg	November 20, 2011	Digital download (EP)	Universal Music	
Portugal	November 20, 2011	Digital download (EP)	Universal Music	
Spain	November 21, 2011	Digital download (EP)	Universal Music	
Singapore	November 21, 2011	Digital download (EP)	Universal Music	
Germany	December 2, 2011	CD	Universal Music	

== See also ==
- List of UK top-ten singles in 2011
