= Here I Am (Kelly Rowland album) =

Album by American recording artist Kelly Rowland

- Standard edition cover artwork; versions include a variation of this image in the artwork

Studio album by Kelly Rowland
- Released: July 22, 2011
- Recorded: 2008–2011
- Studios: Eyeknowasecret Studio (Brentwood, CA); 2nd Floor Studios (Hollywood, CA); 2101 Studios (Los Angeles, CA); Foxxhole Studios (Los Angeles, CA); Hand of God Studios (Los Angeles, CA); Henson Recording Studios (Los Angeles, CA); Larrabee Sound Studios (Los Angeles, CA); Westlake Recording Studios (Los Angeles, CA); Midnight Blue Studios (Miami, FL); Circle House Recording Studios (Miami, FL); Studio A Recording (Dearborn Heights, MI); KMA Studios (New York City, NY); Gum Studios (Paris, France)
- Genres: Pop; dance-pop; R&B
- Length: 39:08
- Label: Universal Motown
- Producers: LaShawn Daniels; Darkchild; Diplo; Earl & E; Alex Gaudino; David Guetta; Hit-Boy; Kuk Harrell; Jonas Jeberg; Jimmy Joker; Jim Jonsin; Rico Love; Ne-Yo; Frédéric Riesterer; RedOne; Jason Rooney; The Runners; StarGate; Tricky Stewart; Souldiggaz; Christopher "c4" Umana; Sandy Vee; The WAV.s; Emily Wright

Kelly Rowland chronology
| Ms. Kelly: Diva Deluxe (2008) | Here I Am (2011) | Talk a Good Game (2013) |

Singles from Here I Am
- 1. "Commander" Released: May 17, 2010; 2. "Rose Colored Glasses" Released: June 28, 2010; 3. "Forever and a Day" Released: September 20, 2010; 4. "Motivation" Released: March 2, 2011; 5. "Lay It on Me" Released: August 16, 2011; 6. "Down for Whatever" Released: October 26, 2011

Here I Am is the third studio album by American singer Kelly Rowland, released through Universal Motown and Universal Music Group on July 22, 2011. The album is Rowland's first release since parting ways with her manager Mathew Knowles and longtime Sony Music record label Columbia Records (through Knowles' Music World Entertainment). Here I Am is predominately a pop, R&B and dance album. It follows Rowland's assertion that "no one puts her in a box" with common themes around womanhood, sexual intimacy and love. Originally scheduled for release in 2010, the album was pushed back after the first round of singles were released to mixed critical and commercial reception.

"Commander" (2010) produced by and featuring David Guetta topped the US Hot Dance Club Songs chart and became a top-ten hit in the United Kingdom and some other European territories. Three other singles: "Forever and a Day", "Rose Colored Glasses" and "Grown Woman", all had limited commercial success and are subsequently included on selected editions of the album or excluded altogether. The international version of the album features seventeen songs including ones excluded from the US editions and some remixes. Here I Am also features guest performances from Lil Wayne, Nelly, Rico Love, Lil Playy, The WAV.s and Big Sean. Production of the album was handled by the likes of Rodney Jerkins, Guetta, Jim Jonsin, Hit-Boy, RedOne and The Runners. Love wrote half of the songs on the album, while Rowland co-wrote three songs on the album.

After re-recording the majority of the album, a new single featuring Lil Wayne titled "Motivation", preceded the album in the United States. It was greeted with a positive reception from critics and topped the US Hot R&B/Hip-Hop Songs chart as well as peaking in the top-twenty of the Billboard Hot 100, becoming Rowland's second most successful single as a lead artist in the United States. Here I Am was received well by critics, many of whom praised the strong productions and vocal performances but questioned some of the guests and a lack of the up-tempo dance sound Rowland had spoken of. Here I Am debuted at number one on the US Top R&B/Hip-Hop Albums chart and number three on the US Billboard 200 albums chart, selling 77,000 copies. To date, it's Rowland's highest-charting album in the United States.

== Background ==
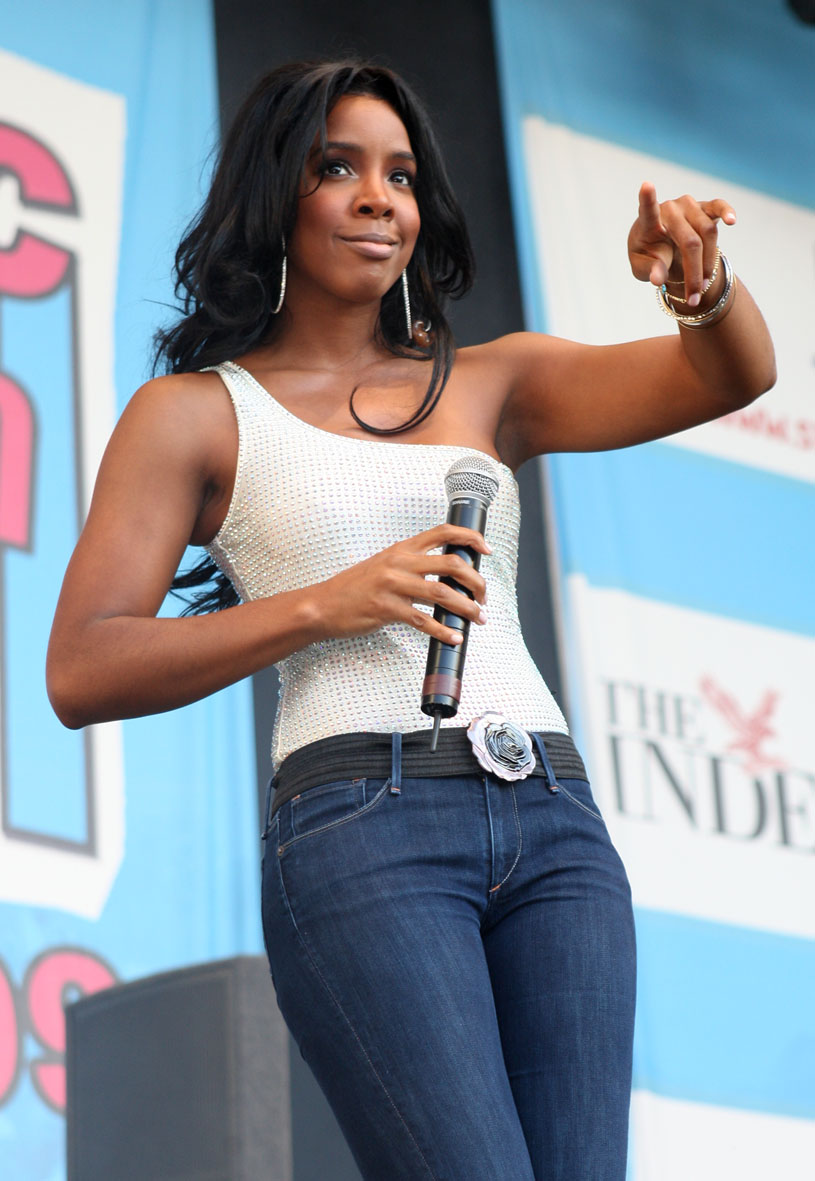
Kelly Rowland at the Love Music Hate Racism Festival in 2009

During her 2008 performances at T4 on the Beach in Weston-Super-Mare, United Kingdom, Rowland was exposed to British bands and live festival music. It inspired her to pursue a new sound for her then untitled third album. She then travelled the South of France for vacation in Summer 2008 where she was exposed to dance music. It was here that she met French disc jockey (DJ) David Guetta and heard the foundations of "When Love Takes Over", a song that would leave a lasting impression on the singer. After falling in love with the song, Rowland would take it back to London to write and record the vocals with Australian songwriters, The Nervo Twins. However Columbia Records were not impressed with the new sound and the record was left unfinished until it was rediscovered by Guetta, when compiling his One Love album.

In March 2009, it was revealed that the singer was parting ways with Columbia Records. Speaking of her decision to leave, Rowland said, "as a solo artist, I felt the need to explore new directions, new challenges, and new freedoms outside my comfort zone and my friends and family at Columbia have been incredibly understanding about my evolution. I want to thank everyone at Columbia for the love and support they've shown and I will never forget how many good times we've had over the years." It was also announced in March that Guetta was releasing "When Love Takes Over", his collaboration with Rowland. The song went on to be a worldwide success for the duo. Jason Lipshutz of Billboard said "the success comes at an intriguing time in Rowland's career", having noted that she had landed a hosting job on Bravo's The Fashion Show and was in between labels.

In October 2009 it was suggested that the success of the single had made Rowland consider signing a new record deal with EMI Music. Despite earlier claims, Rowland told Entertainment Weekly in 2010 that she didn't leave Columbia Records of her own accord. She was dropped because her previous album, Ms. Kelly (2007), was not commercially successful. Then in May 2010, speculation of Rowland's new record ended when an official press release revealed that she had signed to Universal Motown Records. It was whilst recording within the studios with Guetta that Rowland caught the attention of the head of Universal Motown, Sylvia Rhone, which led to the new deal. On the decision to go with Rhone's label, Rowland said "they have really embraced me and have set me up to succeed. I decided, after careful thought, to sign with Universal Motown not only because of their track record of success, but also because they truly put their artists first". Here I Am has a distinctly different sound to Rowland's previous albums. Simply Deep (2002) followed a rock–dance sound, while Ms. Kelly featured an urban sound. However, on her third album, there are a lot of up-tempo tracks. The album is tailored specifically towards individual markets, with the US version of the album featuring more traditional R&B and pop records, while the international version of the album features more of an "up-tempo dancey" sound.

== Musical style ==
"I remember hearing Janet Jackson saying once 'With every album we grow, and we can't be afraid of it. Because we never know everything, and we learn something new every day.' "

— Kelly Rowland

In an interview with The Independent, Rowland admitted that with her first two records she struggled to find her sound. "I was in a stage with the first two records where I was searching and I was like, let me try a rock-dance approach, the label [and management] wanted me to try it and I did it... And then after that came a more urban approach with Ms. Kelly in 2007." She further described the songs on her previous albums as sounding very much the same, which led her to the realisation that she "needed refreshing". She told Entertainment Focus that meeting French DJ David Guetta "changed her perspective and helped to inspire the new sound". She then spent more time in Europe in 2009, something which she said had influenced her. "It's different being over here in Europe and just being able to look at different magazines and fashion shows and things like that. And just thinking about the look and working with different stylists as well. I wanted to make sure it was a look that was all me, you know?." She noted that seeing people's reactions to dance music made her feel "completely intoxicated!." In July 2010, Rowland said during an interview with Alex Catarinella of Paper magazine that "I spent about a year of my life in Europe really listening to a whole bunch of European DJs and hearing dance music a lot on the radio and really loving it. 'When Love Takes Over' was my first introduction to dance music [and] it was a whole other monster. It's really a culture and I love it."

I'm trying to take a page from the amazing books of Donna Summer and Diana Ross. They were so powerful and glam on stage and such a voice for women. I looked at them to take inspiration from and then thought of a way to make it my own."

— Kelly Rowland

When she was interviewed for Blues & Soul in 2010, Rowland explained that the album would blend her urban roots with a strong dance music influence. "I'd say the main difference between this new album and my previous albums, is that this time I wasn't afraid to take a risk. I didn't care whether it was urban, dance, hip-hop, WHATEVER... I just wanted a great track that I could sing and that people would enjoy." Part of the inspiration for the new sound on the album was wanting to do something different. In her interview with The Independent, she said "For me, it was being kind of at a flat line with urban music and wanting something different ... when I did 'When Love Takes Over', it was easy to do it – it was almost like it happened before me in spirit and I walked right into it. ...so I knew I couldn't be afraid of this direction, and I wasn't going to let the thoughts and opinions of others make me afraid to go in this direction." Then in response to criticisms that her long-standing fans would not have their expectations met, she said "I did not forget about my urban roots, nor will I ever ... That is one of the reasons I am here period ... I thank everyone for being so wonderful and so open to me trying something new. I won't let you down this record, I promise you."

She expressed frustrations with the constant comparisons to Beyoncé and opinions that urban artists should only produce urban records. Defending her decision to widen the range of genres on the new album, she said "Nobody puts me in a box!." Alex Cantaranella of Paper magazine described her position on the album as "an unassuming, poised woman who isn't fazed by the 'bullshit that comes with the territory'." Rowland would go on to say that the album was "a mixture of different sounds that express me and where I'm at right now in my career", and promised that the album would be a "defining moment" in her career.

Upon completion of the album, Rowland said:

"I'm so excited for everyone to hear the rest of the album. For a long time, I thought about, 'Should it be dance or should it be urban or should it be this or should it be that?' And I was like, 'Why am I allowing people to make me think like that?" She added, "It's just about artistry, it's just about freedom," she continued. "It's just about music. It's about being alive and being happy and living life and being a woman, just feeling amazing..."

== Writing and composition ==
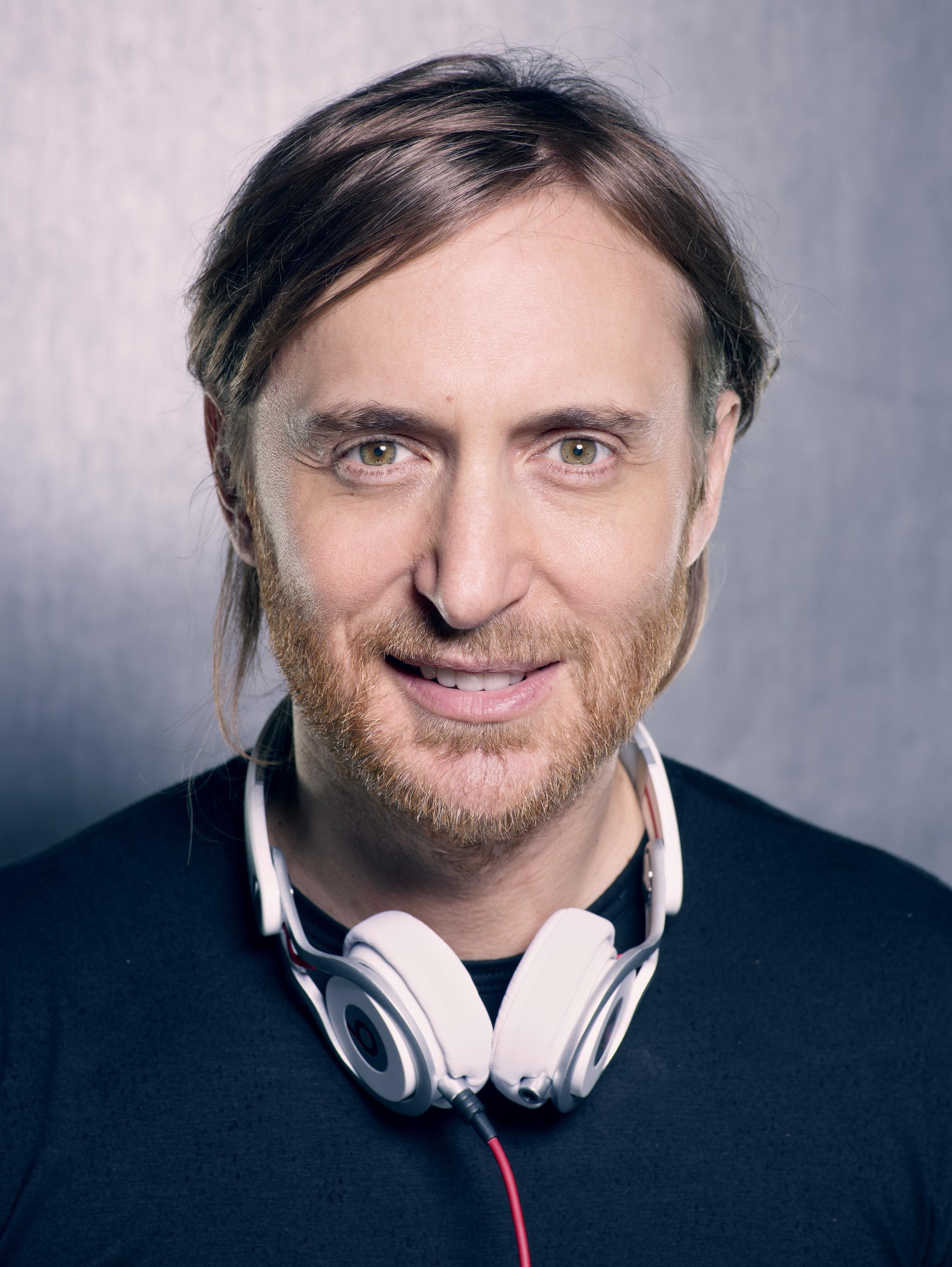
The David Guetta-produced single "Commander" helped Rowland to sign a new record deal.

Sessions took place in Los Angeles, New York City and Miami with Rowland specifically wanting a wide range of songs to choose from.

One of the first people she actually entered the studios with was David Guetta. He co-wrote and produced the song, "Commander", a song with themes of taking control and being sexy. Rowland said of the song, "I hope to see women singing the song like they're in charge. It's important to know that we are commanders who have the power to shape our own destiny." Rico Love wrote the song and, according to Rowland, had credits on around half of the album. "Commander" features on the album as track number nine, while its urban remix featuring Nelly features on the deluxe edition as track fourteen. Guetta also had a hand in co-producing "Forever and a Day" with Danish producer Jonas Jeberg. The song was written by Sam Watters, Andre Merrit, Jeberg and Rowland. During the album's New York listening party in June 2010, "Forever and Day" was described by Honey Mag as a display of Rowland's "vocals" with "long-winded riffs and sky-high notes." It was released as a single in some international markets in September 2010. Aside from Guetta, Rowland was reunited with The Nervo Twins who previously helped Rowland to write "When Love Takes Over".

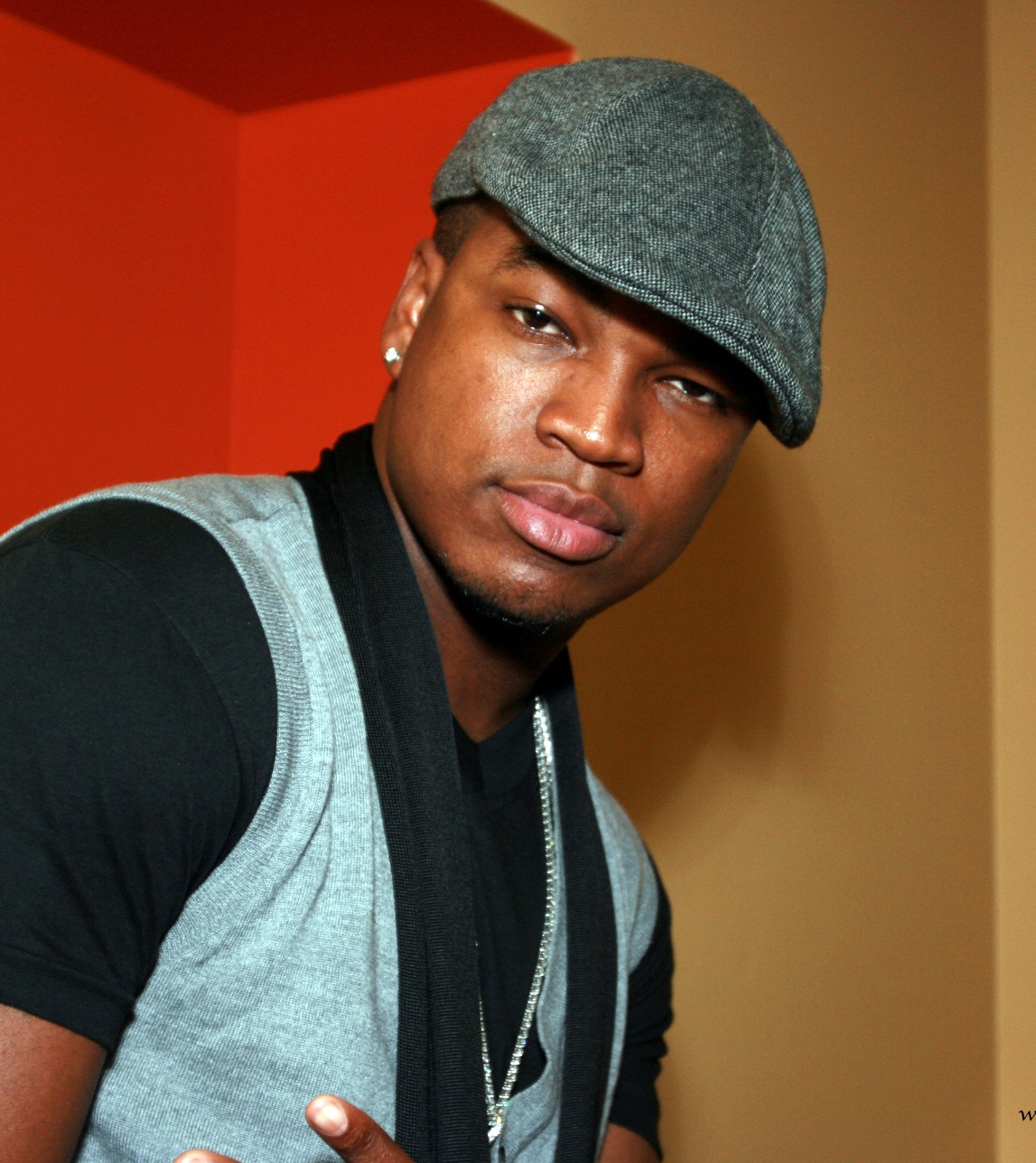
Ne-Yo-penned the non-album single "Grown Woman" as well as "Heaven n Earth".

American R&B singer-songwriter Ne-Yo was also involved in the album and wrote three songs which were produced by StarGate. "Shake Them Haters Off" is an "up-tempo" and fun record with lyrics such as "Its like a job I that I never get a break from/because haters never take a vacation." Another collaboration titled "Grown Ass Woman" (later changed to "Grown Woman") was described by Rowland as her favorite song on the album. Ne-Yo conceptualized the song in a three-minute conversation with Rowland, where she told him she wanted a record where she could claim "I'm grown!". According to Janine Simon from Honey Mag, on "Grown [Ass] Woman" Rowland digs "through old pictures from the Destiny's Child days reflecting on how far she has come yet how 'Grown and silly' she still is." It would later be released as one of the album's two US lead singles. The pair collaborated on a third song, "Heaven n Earth", described by Simon as a ballad using imagery to demonstrate a "sonic portrait, painted with flecks of sentiment; a picture of what the singer believes is what 'we deserve as a people'." According to Rowland, one of these three records was also recorded as a duet featuring Ne-Yo's vocals. None of these songs made the album apart from "Heaven n Earth", which features as song number eleven on the deluxe edition.

Ester Dean and Dr. Luke also worked on the album, respectively writing and producing the other US lead single "Rose Colored Glasses". The song's lyrics portray "the issues that arise when one plays the fool in a relationship." During Rowland's concert series for iHeartRadio, the singer took time out to reflect on the song. She recalled, "The first time I heard the song it made me think of all of the relationships where I had to wear rose-colored glasses." It was also revealed that, during the studio recording session with Dean, she began to cry at the thought of all the "toxic relationships" she had been in "where she needed to leave." Later in an interview with The Belfast Telegraph, Rowland said that the song had taken its toll on her. She said "It brought back a few memories, and when I recorded it I cried so much my vocal chords got swollen." Dean also worked alongside Rowland during last minute studio sessions with producer Tricky Stewart, which spawned a female empowerment song called "I'm Dat Chick". Although "Rose Colored Glasses" was omitted from the US track listing, Dean's song "I'm Dat Chick" made the album appearing as the opening song. Written as a "confidence-boosting" anthem, "I'm Dat Chick" is built around an urban-electro club beat designed to get "even shy women to come out of their shells" according to Rap-Up magazine. Meanwhile, Dean's third contribution, "Lay It on Me", features rapper Big Sean and centers on an up-tempo R&B melody with 808s and high NRG-led production. It features a "tinkling piano" melody and light R&B beat.

"Take Everything", another song recorded for the album, is one of several songs written by Love and produced by Jim Jonsin and was the first record that Rowland recorded with the duo. Jonsin praised his studio sessions with Rowland, describing the new sound as Donna Summer-esque. During an interview with 103.5 KTU FM, she accidentally revealed she had collaborated with Pitbull, but it was not until August 15, 2010, during an interview with 97.9 The Box FM, that it was revealed that he features on "Take Everything". Another song written and produced by the duo is titled "Motivation" featuring Lil Wayne. It was released as the album's lead single in April 2011. Speaking of how the record came about, Rowland said "'Motivation' came about when I was in the studio with [producers] Jim Jonsin and Rico Love, and we kind of were just vibing. I told Rico I wanted something really sexy ... and he came up with 'Motivation' along with Jim. It turned into this amazing record... I played [ 'Motivation' for Lil Wayne ] and he got on it, and it was just as simple as that." The racy lyrics center around Rowland asking her man to use his hands all over her body, and are accompanied by a "synth-saturated beat" produced by Jonsin. In terms of instruments, "Motivation" uses sparse keyboard notes, programmed beats and pulsing synths in the chorus. Wayne adds a rap verse complementing Rowland's seductive suggestions, using the kitchen and a car as metaphors for sex.

A press release also revealed she had worked with Salaam Remi, something which Love confirmed when he said he had worked on a song with Remi called "Love Is the Greatest" that he hoped would make the album. Of these recordings, only "Motivation" made the album appearing as song number three, while its Rebel Rock Remix appears on the deluxe edition as track thirteen. Shondrae 'Bangladesh' Crawford who is best known for producing "Diva" and "Video Phone" by Rowland's ex-bandmate and close friend Beyoncé, revealed to Rap-Up that he had also been in the studio with Rowland. Of the collaborations, Bangladesh said, "the music that we've done is just hard, it's edgy, but it's still sexy, and it's not raunchy ... What I like to do when I go in with artists, I like to recreate and reinvent 'em, even if they didn't need that." Another song recorded for the album was the Brian Kennedy-produced dance song "On and On" which was written by Kennedy, Merritt, Rowland and Robert Allen. "On and On" was used in episode fifteen of the MTV reality TV series The Hills. Both Bangladesh and Kennedy productions are omitted from the album.

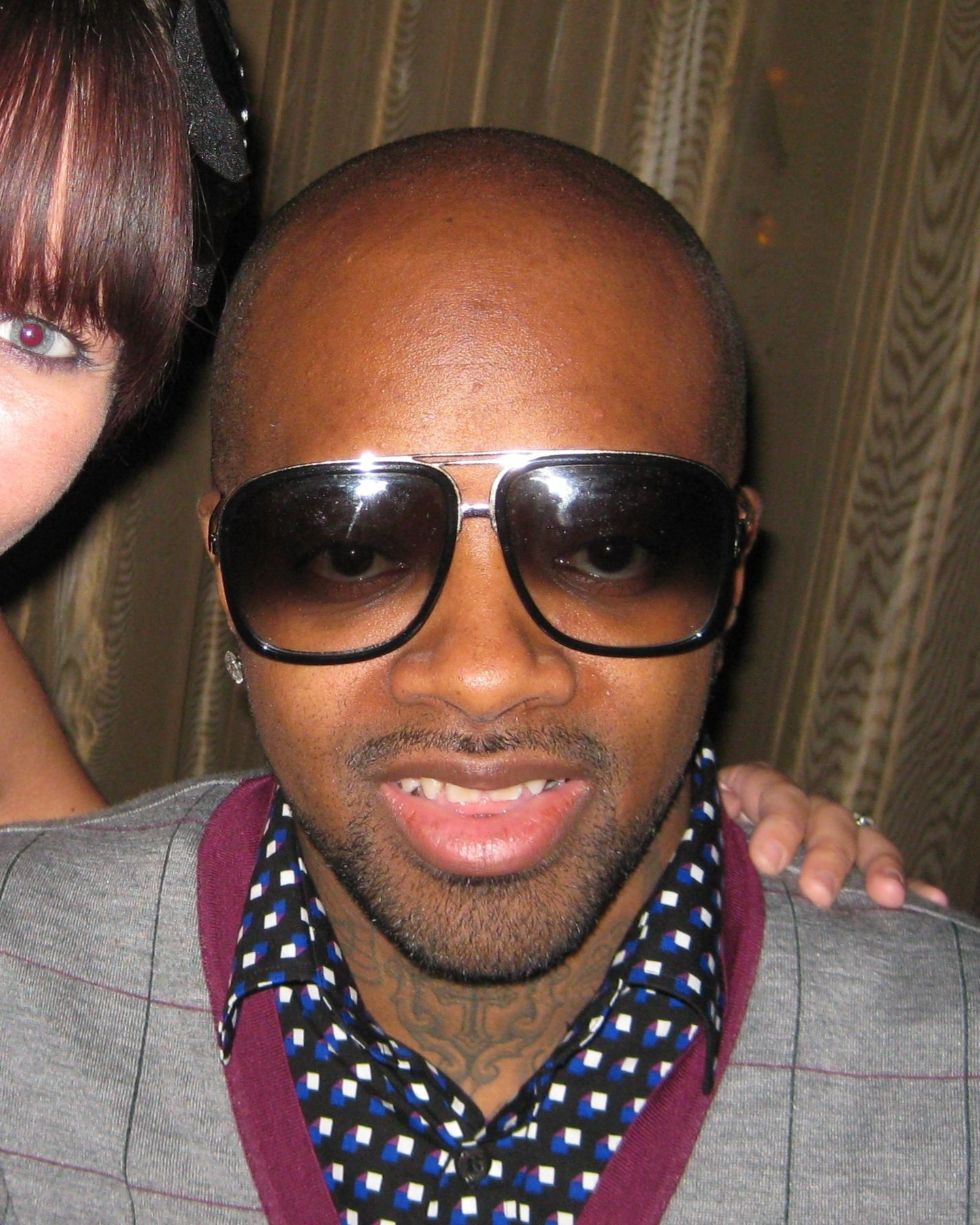
Rowland pushed the album back to work with Jermaine Dupri (pictured) and his writing partner Bryan-Michael Cox.

Other studio sessions took place with Akon, while new writing sessions were planned with season eight American Idol runner-up Adam Lambert. No songs from either Akon or Lambert appear on the US track listing. In September 2010 it was also confirmed that Stewart's fellow songwriting and production partner, The-Dream, had joined his studio sessions with Rowland. Rap-Up reported that The-Dream had been staying in New York City where he was penning songs for Rowland to record. Then on September 5, 2010, songwriter and producer Jermaine Dupri, revealed in his Living the Life series that he was in the studio with Rowland recording material for the album. In the second of these videos, songwriter Bryan-Michael Cox was also present during sessions with Rowland and Dupri. It was later revealed that the opportunity and desire to schedule more recording sessions with the duo led to the album's pushback into 2011. None of the tracks with Dupri, Cox or The-Dream made the album. In January 2011, during a trip to London, it was revealed that Gucci Mane, Lil Wayne and Rick Ross would all appear on the album. Although by the time the track listing was revealed, only Wayne's song features while rappers Mane and Ross were replaced with new songs, respectively featuring Big Sean, Lil Playy and Love.

Love features on the 2 Live Crew-sampling "All of the Night". Using elements of "One and One", the steamy duet sees "Rowland comparing her bedroom activities to music." Love also co-wrote and co-produced another R&B midtempo for the album titled "Feeling Me Right Now", where the lyrics describe what it is like to find "self-love" in the club. The final Love-penned song which appears on the album is titled "Each Other" and was co-written/co-produced by Souldiggaz. Rodney "Darkchild" Jerkins scores two songs on the album, including the Lil Playy-assisted "Work It Man". Beginning with a strong piano riff, the song picks up its tempo resulting in a "speaker-banger." The lyrics see Rowland telling listeners what kind of man she wants. "Turn It Up", another Darkchild production, features a synth-heavy production with lyrics about having a good time and allowing karma to deal with a cheating partner. Joseph "Lonny" Bereal helped Rowland and two others to co-write "Keep It Between Us", a song that appears as the eighth song on the album. In February 2011, during New York Fashion Week, Rowland confirmed that she also had sessions arranged with RedOne, which led to the conception of the album's tenth song, a Eurodance song called "Down for Whatever", co-produced by The WAV.s and Jimmy Joker.

Rowland revealed in August 2010 that she would be releasing a different, "more up-tempo dancey" version of the album in international territories after she experienced more success with dance music internationally. With the album beginning production from as early as late 2008, Rowland completed a number of songs with a wide range of producers, some of which did not make the US version of the album. Rowland confirmed in July 2011 that the European track listing would consist of leftover songs from the album's recording sessions as well as songs from the US version and some newly recorded songs. The international version of the album features the original ten songs from the standard edition plus: "Heaven n Earth" and "Each Other" from the deluxe edition, as well as "When Love Takes Over" (with Guetta), "Rose Colored Glasses", "Motivation (Diplo Remix)", "Forever and a Day" and "What a Feeling" (with Alex Gaudino), all excluded from the US edition of the album.

== Artwork ==
On June 27, 2011, just under a month away from its US release, Rowland revealed the two versions of the album cover: one for the standard edition of the album and the other for the deluxe edition. The shoot took place with fashion photographer Derek Blanks. Photos from the shoot and a series of promotional/press photos were released on June 13, 2011. The shoot included various scenes including Rowland pinned against a bamboo fence and numerous semi-naked shots. Some of the images were tinted blue, and images shot include those used for the album cover and single cover for "Lay It on Me". Make-up for the shoot was done by Latasha Wright while Kim Kimble handled the hairstyling.

== Title and release ==
On June 17, 2010, Rowland held an album listening party at Hudson Hall in New York City where she revealed that her third studio album would be eponymously titled. Subsequently, during an interview with Paper magazine the following month, Rowland announced that the self-titled album would "introduce Kelly Rowland being Kelly Rowland," with a wide range of records. She said, "I'm the most confident I've been on a record ever. And it's by myself. I love it." Kelly Rowland was due to arrive in stores on September 14, 2010. However, just days after the interview, the singer said she was having second thoughts about the name. A facility was set up whereby fans could suggest new names through Rowland's official website. The album was also pushed back a week, though no reason was given. This would be swiftly followed by another announcement that Rowland had seized the opportunity for new studio sessions with Akon and Christopher "Tricky" Stewart (respectively) and hence the album would now come out on October 26, 2010 The album was pushed back a fourth time, by one week with no reason give.

In an interview with JLB Mornings on WJLB Radio, Rowland would go to explain that part of the reasons for the constant pushbacks were her desires to perfect the album. This was followed by another pushback to November 9, 2010, and an announcement on The Today Show that despite numerous false reports and rumors, the album was still missing a title. She said "I saw one blog saying that the album was called One Woman Show, [and] that's totally never been the case." Expanding further she said that "the title has to work with the tracks that make the record, and that's why even though there have been some good suggestions from fans I can't decide on one that fits". Then on September 11, 2010, during New York Fashion Week, Rowland broke the news that the album was incomplete and would be released in 2011 so that she could work with R&B songwriting and production duo Jermaine Dupri and Bryan-Michael Cox.

Also in mid-late September it was revealed that three new names had been shortlisted for the album, including one suggested by a fan. Then some eight months after revealing that three names had been shortlisted for the album, Rowland gave an exclusive interview with Billboard, where she revealed that the album would be called Here I Am. In the interview she said:

"I was talking to my product manager,... I said I wanted people to know that this is the record, the sound I've been working toward... that here I am. And she said, that's the title. It just connected with my heart and the music as well. It stands for everything I've gone through and thought about for this record as a woman. It's very strong."

After receiving a release date of Fall 2011, the album was moved up to July 26, 2011, following the success of the album's lead single "Motivation". Rowland had previously said that she had intended to release two alternative versions of the album, one for the US and a more up-tempo dance version for international markets. A new version of the album was released in the United Kingdom on November 28, 2011, coinciding with Rowland's new job as a judge on series eight of The X Factor UK. Rowland released Here I Am in the UK with a performance on the show.

== Marketing and promotion ==
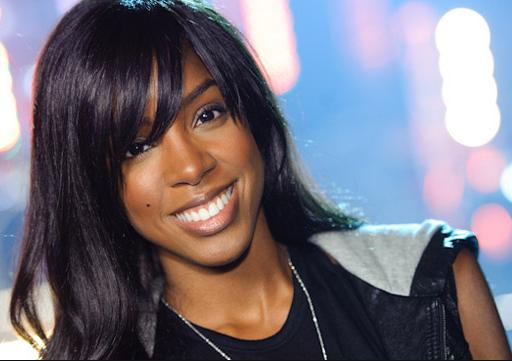
Rowland appearing at her 2010 Walmart Soundcheck mini-concert for her third studio album.

The promotional trail for the project began in March 2010 when Rowland performed at Cathy Guetta's Fuck Me I'm Famous party at the Winter Music Conference in Miami. Following this, Rowland held an album listening party at Hudson Hall in New York City on June 17, 2010. During the party, Rowland was interviewed by Gayle King while introducing songs from the album. Among those played were, "Rose Colored Glasses", "Shake Them Haters Off", "Grown [Ass] Woman", "Forever and a Day" and "Heaven n Earth". From as far back as January 12, 2010, Rowland gave magazine interviews about the album including spreads with New!, Take 5, and Musicology magazine. In June 2010, she appeared in the United Kingdom giving interviews with various radio stations, including Gaydar. Rowland also performed at a second Fuck Me I'm Famous party, this time in Paris on June 25 and 26. She was interviewed for UK entertainment site 'Entertainment Focus' during her promotional tour in London, UK, before returning to the US on July 3, 2010, to host the Independence Day (July 4) celebrations at the Pure nightclub in Las Vegas. These performances were reprised at 103.5 KTU's Beatstock 2010 in New York on July 8 and 9. Then for a week beginning on July 26, 2010, Rowland flew to Australia to help the Optus mobile network to launch the iPhone 4. Part of the promotion included her performing a mini-concert for the network's customers. She also performed at the 2010 FlavaMen Blatino Awards afterparty.

Rowland performed for an exclusive audience of fans at the Gramercy Theatre, New York City on August 26, 2010, where she played a mini-set of new and old songs, as well as performing at the 'Ladies Night' during the Atlanta Black Gay Pride weekend on September 3 to 5, 2010. However, not all of the promotion went as planned; the New York Post reported that Rowland had lip-synced during her performances at the P.C. Richard and Son Theatre for the iHeartRadio concert season. On June 26, 2011, Rowland took to the stage of the 2011 BET Awards to perform "Motivation" for the first time. Rowland promoted the album with live performances on televised shows, including The Tonight Show with Jay Leno on July 29, 2011 and on Jimmy Kimmel Live! on September 26, 2011. Throughout September and October 2011, she was a supporting act for Chris Brown's North American leg of his F.A.M.E. Tour. A music video for the song, "Keep It Between Us", was released on January 25, 2012, and shows actor Lance Gross playing Rowland's love interest. In April 2012, Rowland travelled to Australia as one of the performing acts at its largest urban music festival, Supafest.

== Singles ==
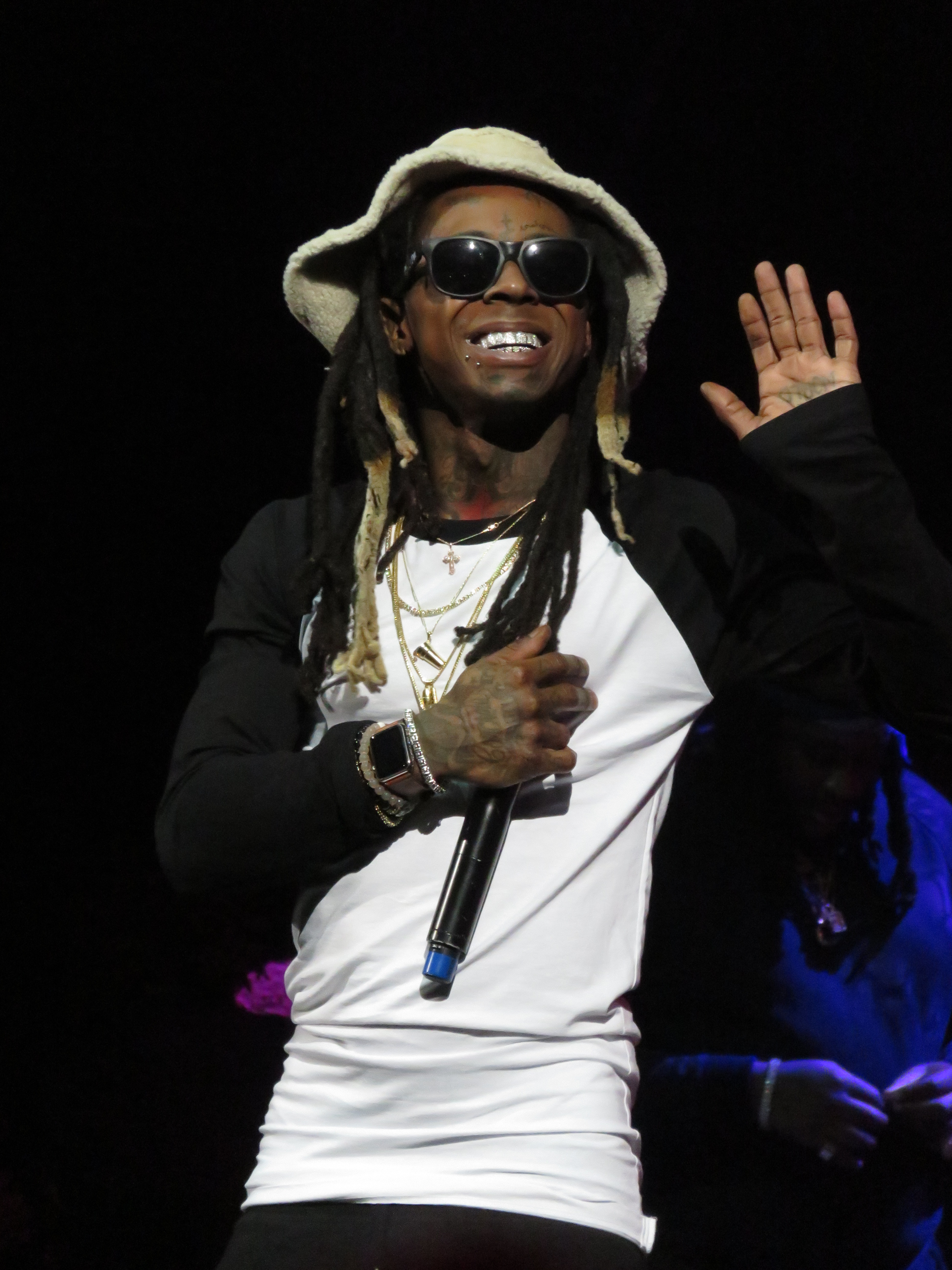
Lil Wayne appears on the US lead single "Motivation" with a guest rap verse.

"Commander" was unveiled as Here I Am's first single during the 2010 Winter Music Conference on March 27, 2010. It features and was produced by French disc jockey (DJ) David Guetta, and was released from May 17, 2010, to iTunes Stores around the world for digital download. Upon release the single was met with positive reception from music critics who praised the dance sound of the song. In the United Kingdom, "Commander" topped the UK Dance Chart and became a top-ten hit on the UK Singles Chart, and Rowland's best chart position since 2008. Despite not being serviced as a single in the United States, it managed to top the Hot Dance Club Songs chart.

Initially in the United States, separate pop and R&B singles were planned to be serviced to radio in a dual release strategy. The first of these singles, the Dr. Luke-produced "Rose Colored Glasses" was serviced to contemporary hit radio and released for digital download on June 29, 2010. It received praise for showcasing a "trademark classy, controlled delivery" from Rowland, and "real strength is in its story and theme, that carries an emotional weight that Commander's talk of 'dance floor loving' could never reach." Despite this, the single only managed to peak at number thirty-nine on the US Top 40 Airplay chart, as compiled by Media Base. The second of the aforementioned dual singles for the US market, the R&B single "Grown Woman", (produced by StarGate) was serviced to urban, rhythmic and urban adult contemporary radios on June 29, 2010, with a digital release coming later on. It was slightly more successful than "Rose Colored Glasses", managing to peak at number fifty-one in its third week on the Hot R&B/Hip-Hop Songs chart. While "Rose Colored Glasses" was featured on the international edition of the album, "Grown Woman" was excluded from both versions. International markets were serviced with a second single, "Forever and a Day", that was produced by Jonas Jeberg and co-produced by Guetta. It premiered via BBC Radio 1 on August 18, 2010, and was released from September 20, 2010. Despite receiving praise of Rowland's strong vocals, the single failed to match the success of "Commander", peaking at number forty-nine on the UK Singles Chart.

After the failed attempt to launch the album with the dual US releases of "Rose Colored Glasses" and "Grown Woman", Rowland announced that the album would be rebooted with a brand new lead single for the US market. In March 2011, Rowland released the new lead single "Motivation" featuring Lil Wayne, replacing the previous lead singles. It was produced by Jim Jonsin with a synth-saturated beat. The single was praised for its sex appeal, and upon release peaked at number seventeen on the Billboard Hot 100 as well as peaking at number one on Hot R&B/Hip-Hop Songs. "Motivation" became Rowland's highest-charting single on the R&B format as a solo lead artist, and achieved the highest Hot 100 debut of her career. Ultimately it became Rowland's second-highest-charting single, and the only single from Here I Am to chart on the Hot 100.

The next US single was "Lay It on Me" featuring rapper Big Sean. Billboard described "Lay It on Me" is an uptempo song, led by an 808 and a hi-NRG piano introduction with production by Hitboy. The single received positive praise from critics, who felt it was catchy and sexy. "Lay It on Me" was sent to rhythmic radio on August 16, 2011, and to urban radio on September 6, 2011. The video for "Lay It on Me" was filmed in early September 2011, and was directed by British fashion photographer/director Sarah Chatfield and choreographer Frank Gatson Jr., both of whom had worked with Rowland on the video for "Motivation". The music video was released on October 12, 2011. The next international single was the RedOne-produced "Down for Whatever" featuring The WAV.s. The music video for "Down for Whatever" was also filmed in early September 2011 and directed by Chatfield and Gatson Jr. "Down for Whatever" impacted UK radio on September 16, 2011 and the music video was released on October 18, 2011. "Down for Whatever" was released in New Zealand and Australia on October 26, 2011, in Germany on November 4, 2011, and in the UK on November 20, 2011. The music video for the single "Keep It Between Us" was filmed in November 2011 in Paris; actor Lance Gross plays Rowland's love interest in the video.

== Critical reception ==
Professional ratings
Aggregate scores
| Source | Rating |
|---|---|
| AnyDecentMusic? | 5.5/10 |
| Metacritic | 64/100 |
Review scores
| Source | Rating |
| AllMusic | 4/5 stars |
| The A.V. Club | B |
| Entertainment Weekly | B |
| The Guardian | 4/5 stars |
| Los Angeles Times | 1/4 stars |
| MusicOMH | 3/5 stars |
| The Observer | 3/5 stars |
| Rolling Stone | 3/5 stars |
| Slant Magazine | 2.5/5 stars |
| USA Today | 2.5/4 stars |

Here I Am received mixed reviews from music critics. At Metacritic, which assigns a normalized rating out of 100 to reviews from mainstream critics, the album received an average score of 64, based on sixteen reviews, indicating "generally favourable reviews." AllMusic editor Andy Kellman gave Here I Am four out of five stars and complimented its appeal to "hip-hop and R&B" radio, adding that "Although very eclectic taste is required to appreciate in full, this is clearly Rowland's brightest, most confident album yet." Entertainment Weekly's Adam Markovitz gave Here I Am a B rating and called it "a solid if unambitious set of medium-hot finger snappers." Simon Gage from the Daily Express called Here I Am a "jumping" collection of up-tempo songs comparable to Donna Summer, but "broadly much tougher and maybe just a tad over-processed." Gage added that Rowland could include Here I Am amongst her other career highlights such as her singles "Work" (2008) and "When Love Takes Over," as well as her judging role on series 8 of The X Factor UK.

The A.V. Club's Evan Rytlewski called Here I Am a declaration of Rowland's liberation. Rytlewski attributed the album's appeal to the producers, who he felt "drove forward the sound" and prevented Rowland from taking "songs too seriously" as done on Simply Deep. He concluded his review by also praising Rowland's choice to include elements of dance music. Elyssa Garnder from USA Today gave the album a mixed review, stating that "Rowland traverses the gamut of predictable romantic scenarios prettily enough... alas, Here I Am proves a lot more cautious than that dare suggests." Jon Caramanica from The New York Times called the album both smart and surprising. "Here I Am is something much more confident and more surprising [than expected]. It's a chewy and moody R&B album on which Ms. Rowland sounds assured and vital. Or, at minimum, is made to sound that way... Her vocals are stacked thick and placed loud in the mix, but while they're noticeable, they're not particularly notable apart from their arrangements."

Despite finding some of its material unoriginal, Ken Capobianco of The Boston Globe commented that "Rowland makes up for her limited range with expressiveness throughout," while noting that the songs are centered around "self-affirmation and confidence." He ended his review by stating that the album's closing track "Down for Whatever" had a "pounding groove" which should have been the sentiment for the rest of the album. Allison Stewart from The Washington Post commented that Here I Am would not establish a personality for Rowland, but it did not matter as she was in a place in her career where she did not need one. Described as a "perfectly likeable club-centric R&B" offering, Stewart said Rowland makes the most of the "killer beats and a flat affect" trends in the industry. Comments echoed by Michaelangelo Matos from the Los Angeles Times' whose scathing review criticised the "bland material," particularly noting "secondhand beats" and awkward lyrics. Slant Magazine's Jesse Cataldo also called the album mediocre. Cataldo said "the skimpy roster [of rappers] makes Here I Am sound distressingly bare, and depressingly short on surprises and diversion. Rowland makes up for this by pushing the sex angle, but this pose never seems entirely natural." Now″s Jason Richards described Here I Am as an "unsurprising pop effort that fails to find a distinctive voice for the singer."

== Commercial performance ==
In the United States, Here I Am debuted on the Billboard 200 at number three, having sold 77,000 copies; it became Rowland's highest debuting and charting album. Here I Am also debuted at number one on the Top R&B/Hip-Hop Albums. As of March 2013, the album has sold 241,692 copies in the US. Here I Am debuted at number forty-five on the Canadian Albums Chart and number nine on the Canadian R&B Albums Chart.

The US version of Here I Am was made available for purchase in some international territories. The US version debuted at number sixty-one on the Australian Albums Chart and number fifteen on the Australian Urban Albums Chart. It performed better in the United Kingdom where it debuted at number thirty-eight on the UK Digital Albums Chart but slightly lower on the UK R&B Albums Chart at number sixteen. Upon release of the international version of the album, Here I Am debuted at number fifty-six on the UK Albums Chart and number ten on the UK R&B Albums Chart, with first week sales of 8,704. The following week, the album climbed to numbers forty-three and eight, respectively. Here I Am was first certified silver by the British Phonographic Industry (BPI) for sales of 60,000 units in 2013 and in 2025 was certified Gold for sales of 100,000 units.

== Track listing ==
Here I Am – Standard edition
| No. | Title | Writer(s) | Producer(s) | Length |
|---|---|---|---|---|
| 1. | "I'm Dat Chick" | Christopher "Tricky" Stewart; Ester Dean; Lamont Neuble | Stewart; Kuk Harrell^{[a]} | 4:04 |
| 2. | "Work It Man" (featuring Lil Playy) | Rodney "Darkchild" Jerkins; Priscilla Renea Hamilton; LaShawn "Big Shiz" Daniels; Kelly Rowland; Darrell Davidson | Jerkins; Daniels^{[a]} | 4:10 |
| 3. | "Motivation" (featuring Lil Wayne) | James Scheffer; Rico Love; Daniel Morris; Dwayne Carter | Jim Jonsin; Love | 3:50 |
| 4. | "Lay It on Me" (featuring Big Sean) | Dean; Chauncey Hollis; Sean Anderson | Hit-Boy | 4:03 |
| 5. | "Feelin' Me Right Now" | Love; Earl Hood; Eric Goudy II | Love; Earl & E | 3:57 |
| 6. | "Turn It Up" | Jerkins; Hamilton; Thomas Lumpkins; John J. Conte, Jr. | Jerkins^{[b]}; Daniels^{[a]} | 3:36 |
| 7. | "All of the Night" (featuring Rico Love) | Luther R. Campbell; David P. Hobbs; Mark D. Ross; Christopher Wongwon; Love; Jermaine Jackson; Andrew Harr; David L. Anderson II; Jon-David Anderson | The Runners; Love^{[b]} | 3:51 |
| 8. | "Keep It Between Us" | J. J-Doe Smith; Joseph "Lonny" Bereal; Amber "Sevyn" Streeter; Rowland; Christopher "C4" Umana | Umana | 4:10 |
| 9. | "Commander" (featuring David Guetta) | Rowland; Love; David Guetta; Sandy Vee | Guetta; Vee; Love^{[a]} | 3:39 |
| 10. | "Down for Whatever" (featuring The WAV.s) | RedOne; Teddy Sky; Jimmy Joker; Bilal "The Chef" | RedOne; Jimmy Joker; The WAV.s | 3:55 |
| Total length: | | | | 39:25 |

Here I Am – Deluxe edition bonus tracks
| No. | Title | Writer(s) | Producer(s) | Length |
|---|---|---|---|---|
| 11. | "Heaven & Earth" | Shaffer Smith; Mikkel Eriksen; Tor Hermansen | StarGate; Ne-Yo^{[c]} | 3:37 |
| 12. | "Each Other" | Karriem Mack; Sean Owens; Maurice Wade; Nigel Talley; Love | Souldiggaz | 3:48 |
| 13. | "Motivation" (Rebel Rock Remix) (featuring Lil Wayne) | Scheffer; Love; Morris; Carter | Jonsin; Love | 3:41 |
| 14. | "Commander" (Urban Remix) (featuring Nelly) | Love; Hood; Goudy II; Rowland; Guetta; Wilhelm; Cornell Haynes | Earl & E; Love^{[b]} | 4:09 |
| Total length: | | | | 54:29 |

Here I Am – Japanese deluxe edition bonus tracks
| No. | Title | Writer(s) | Producer(s) | Length |
|---|---|---|---|---|
| 15. | "Motivation" (DJ Mike D Pop Remix) (featuring Lil Wayne) | Scheffer; Love; Morris; Carter | Jonsin; Love; DJ Mike D^{[d]} | 3:43 |
| 16. | "Commander" (David Guetta Remix) | Rowland; Love; Guetta; Wilhelm | Guetta; Vee; Love^{[a]} | 5:47 |
| Total length: | | | | 63:59 |

Here I Am – International edition (bonus tracks)
| No. | Title | Writer(s) | Producer(s) | Length |
|---|---|---|---|---|
| 11. | "Heaven & Earth" | Smith; Eriksen; Hermansen | StarGate; Ne-Yo^{[c]} | 3:37 |
| 12. | "Each Other" | Love; Mack; Owens; Talley; Wade | Souldiggaz | 3:48 |
| 13. | "When Love Takes Over" (David Guetta featuring Kelly Rowland) | Guetta; Rowland; Frédéric Riesterer; Miriam Nervo; Olivia Nervo | Guetta; Riesterer | 3:09 |
| 14. | "Rose Colored Glasses" | Lukasz Gottwald; Dean | Dr. Luke; Emily Wright^{[a]} | 4:00 |
| 15. | "Motivation" (Diplo Remix) (featuring Lil Wayne) | Scheffer; Love; Morris; Carter | Jonsin; Love; Diplo^{[d]} | 3:56 |
| 16. | "Forever and a Day" | Jonas Jeberg; Rowland; Samuel Watters; Merritt | Jonas Jeberg | 3:34 |
| 17. | "What a Feeling" (Alex Gaudino featuring Kelly Rowland) | Fortunato Gaudino; Giuseppe D'Albenzio; Emmanuel Mijares; Jenson Vaughan; Rowland; Bereal | Alex Gaudino; Jason Rooney | 2:58 |
| Total length: | | | | 64:24 |

Notes

- ^[a] denotes vocal producer.
- ^[b] denotes record producer, who also produced vocals on that song.
- ^[c] denotes co-producer.
- ^[d] denotes remix producer.
- "All of the Night", contains an interpolation of the 2 Live Crew song "One and One", written by Luther Campbell, David Hobbs, Mark Ross and Christopher Wongwon.

== Credits and personnel ==
Credits for Here I Am adapted from Barnes & Noble.

=== Recording locations ===
- Brentwood, California – Eyeknowasecret Studio
- Hollywood, California – 2nd Floor Studios
- Los Angeles, California – 2101 Studios; Foxxhole Studios; Hand of God Studios; Henson Recording; Larrabee Sound Studios; Westlake Recording Studios
- Miami, Florida – Midnight Blue Studios; Circle House Recording Studios
- Dearborn Heights, Michigan – Studio A Recording
- New York City – KMA STUDIOS
- Paris – Gum Studios

=== Performers ===
- Kelly Rowland – lead vocals
- Lil Playy – guest vocal performance (track 2)
- Lil Wayne – guest vocal performance (tracks 3 and 13)
- Big Sean – guest vocal performance (track 4)
- Joseph "Lonny" Bereal – background vocals
- Rico Love – guest vocal performance (track 7)
- David Guetta – credited performers (track 9)
- The WAV.s – credited performers (track 10)
- Nelly – guest vocal performance (track 14)
- Amber Streeter – background vocals

=== Technical staff and musicians ===
- Diego Avendaño – engineer
- Marshall Bryant – engineer
- Richard Butler (Rico Love) – vocal producer, producer, remixer
- Cary Clark – engineer
- LaShawn "The Big Shiz" Daniels – vocal producer
- Ester Dean – vocal producer
- Priscilla Renea Hamilton – songwriter
- Aubry "Big Juice" Delaine – engineer, vocal engineer
- Mike "Handz" Donaldson – engineer
- Robert "LB" Dorsey – vocal engineer
- Earl Hood – producer, programming
- Eric "E2" Goudy II – producer, programming
- Seth Foster – mastering engineer
- Chris Gehringer – mastering
- David Guetta – producer, recording engineer, audio mixer, programming
- Chauncey "Hit-Boy" Hollis – producer, programming
- Kuk Harrell – engineer, vocal producer
- Sam "The Engineer" Jaquet – engineer
- Rodney "Darkchild" Jerkins – producer, vocal producer, instrumentation
- Jimmy Joker – programming, producer, instrumentation
- AJ Junior – engineer
- Nadir "RedOne" Khayat – producer, programming, producer, engineer, vocal arrangements, instrumentation
- Kevin "DJ Rebel" Leyers – producer (track 13)
- Robert Marks – engineer
- Thurston McCrea – assistant recording engineer
- R.E.A.L. Music – keyboard arrangements
- Trevor Muzzy – engineer, vocal editing
- Chris "Tek" O'Ryan – engineer
- Christopher Richardson – engineer
- The Runners (Jermaine Jackson & Andrew Harr) – producer
- James Scheffer (Jim Jonsin) – producer, programming
- Shaffer "Ne-Yo" Smith – producer, vocal producer
- StarGate (Mikkel Eriksen & Tor Hermansen) – producer, engineer
- Christopher "Tricky" Stewart – producer
- Souldiggaz (Karriem Mack & Shaun Owens) – producer
- Latif Tayour – engineer
- Brian "B-Luv" Thomas – engineer
- Christopher "c4" Umana – producer, programming
- Orlando Vitto – engineer
- The WAV.s – programming, producer, instrumentation
- Sandy Wilhem (Sandy Vee) – recording engineer, audio mixer, programming
- Andrew Wuepper – engineer

== Charts ==
=== Weekly charts ===
Weekly chart performance for Here I Am
| Chart (2011) | Peak position |
|---|---|
| Australian Albums (ARIA) | 61 |
| Australian Urban Albums (ARIA) | 15 |
| Canadian Albums (Nielsen SoundScan) | 45 |
| Canadian R&B Albums (Nielsen SoundScan) | 9 |
| Irish Albums (IRMA) | 87 |
| Japanese Albums (Oricon) | 126 |
| Scottish Albums (Official Charts) | 41 |
| South Korean International Albums (Gaon) | 28 |
| Swiss Albums (Schweizer Hitparade) | 69 |
| UK Albums (Official Charts) | 43 |
| UK R&B Albums (Official Charts) | 8 |
| US Billboard 200 | 3 |
| US Top R&B/Hip-Hop Albums (Billboard) | 1 |

=== Year-end charts ===
Year-end chart performance for Here I Am
| Chart (2011) | Peak position |
|---|---|
| US Billboard 200 | 171 |
| US Top R&B/Hip-Hop Albums (Billboard) | 44 |

== Certifications ==
Certifications for Here I Am
| Region | Certification | Certified units/sales |
|---|---|---|
| United Kingdom (BPI) | Gold | 100,000^{‡} |
^{‡} Sales+streaming figures based on certification alone.

== Release history ==
Here I Am release history
| Region | Date | Version(s) | Format(s) | Label(s) | Ref. |
|---|---|---|---|---|---|
| Germany | July 22, 2011 | Standard | Digital download | Universal Music | |
| Italy | July 22, 2011 | Deluxe | Digital download | Universal Music | |
| United Kingdom | July 25, 2011 | Deluxe | Digital download | Universal Island | |
| Canada | July 26, 2011 | Standard; deluxe | CD | Universal Music | |
| United States | July 26, 2011 | Standard; deluxe | CD; digital download | Universal Motown | |
| Australia | July 29, 2011 | Deluxe | CD | Universal Music | |
| United Kingdom | August 8, 2011 | Standard | CD | Universal Island | |
| Japan | September 21, 2011 | Deluxe | CD | Universal Music | |
| United Kingdom | November 28, 2011 | International edition | CD; digital download | Universal Island | |
| Austria | December 2, 2011 | International edition | CD; digital download | Universal Music | |
| Germany | December 2, 2011 | International edition | CD; digital download | Universal Music | |
| Poland | December 2, 2011 | International edition | CD; digital download | Universal Music | |
| Switzerland | December 2, 2011 | International edition | CD; digital download | Universal Music | |
| Australia | December 9, 2011 | International edition | CD; digital download | Universal Music | |
| New Zealand | January 16, 2012 | International edition | CD; digital download | Universal Music | |
