= Erik Reece =

Erik Reece is an American writer. He is the author of six books of nonfiction – Lost Mountain: A Year in the Vanishing Wilderness: Radical Strip Mining and the Devastation of Appalachia (New York: Riverhead Books, 2006) and An American Gospel: On Family, History, and The Kingdom of God (New York: Riverhead Books, 2009), The Embattled Wilderness (Atlanta, University of Georgia Press, 2013), Utopia Drive: A Road Trip Through America's Most Radical Idea (New York: Farrar Straus and Giroux, 2017), Practice Resurrection (Berkeley: Counterpoint Press, 2017), Clear Creek: Toward a Natural Philosophy (Charleston: West Virginia University Press, 2023), one book of poetry,Kingfisher Blues (Lexington: Fireside Industries Press, 2024), and numerous essays and magazine articles, published in Harper's Magazine, The Nation, and Orion magazine. He also maintains a blog The Future We Want for True/Slant.

He is writer-in-residence at the University of Kentucky in Lexington, where he teaches environmental journalism, writing, and literature.

== Life ==
Reece was born and raised in Louisville, Kentucky. He received two degrees from the University of Kentucky, where he studied with Guy Davenport.

== Work ==
=== Prose ===
Reece's first book-length prose was a companion essay to Guy Davenport's collection of his drawings and paintings, A Balance of Quinces.

Reece's 2006 book Lost Mountain: A Year in the Vanishing Wilderness (New York: Riverhead Books, 2006), with photos by John J. Cox and a foreword by Wendell Berry, chronicles the devastating effects of mountaintop removal mining in Appalachia from October 2003 through November 2004. The book grew out of an essay for Harper's Magazine entitled "Death of a Mountain: Radical Strip Mining and the Leveling of Appalachia," which was published in the April 2005 edition and which would win the John B. Oakes Award for Distinguished Environmental Journalism from the Columbia University Graduate School of Journalism.

In 2009, Reece published An American Gospel: On Family, History, and The Kingdom of God (New York: Riverhead Books, 2009), a book about Reece's upbringing as the son and grandson of Baptist preachers, his father's suicide, and his own subsequent struggle to find a form of Christianity with which he would feel comfortable—and the guidance he received from the writings of Thomas Jefferson, Walt Whitman and other American geniuses. This book, too, grew out of an essay for Harper's Magazine, "Jesus Without the Miracles: Thomas Jefferson's Bible and the Gospel of Thomas".

=== Poetry ===
Reece's first published book was a chapbook of poems, My Muse Was Supposed to Meet Me Here, published in 1992.

He edited the 2007 anthology Field Work: Modern Poems from Eastern Forests (Lexington, KY: The University of Press of Kentucky, 2007), an anthology of poems about the landscape and ecology of the eastern United States. It includes the work of modern American poets (among them, Robert Frost, Wendell Berry, Hayden Carruth, Charles Wright) plus that of four classical Chinese poets, who wandered and wrote about an area of southeastern China that is similar in landscape and ecology to the eastern woodlands of the United States.

In 2024 he published Kingfisher Blues through Fireside Industries, an imprint run by author Silas House of the University Press of Kentucky. The book is a revealing and lyrical look at Reece's alcoholism and recovery.

== Awards ==
In addition to the John B. Oakes Award for Distinguished Environmental Journalism from the Columbia University Graduate School of Journalism, in 2006 Erik Reece received the Sierra Club's David R. Brower Award for Environmental Journalism.
