= Jessica Faye Carter =

American businesswoman

Jessica F. Carter
- Citizenship: American
- Education: Spelman College; Duke University; Princeton Theological Seminary
- Occupations: Lawyer, IT entrepreneur, author
- Employer(s): Nette Media, founder and CEO
- Known for: Cultural diversity, gender studies and social media

Jessica Faye Carter is an American lawyer, author, minister, and businesswoman. She is the founder and chief executive officer of Nette Media, a company specializing in social media technologies for women. She also ministers to the congregation of Bethany Covenant Church in Berlin, Connecticut, since 2013, and is the founder of Hear Wisdom Ministries. Carter is a nationally recognized expert on cultural and gender diversity in the workplace and advises corporations, organizations and educational institutions.

== Education ==
Carter earned a Juris Doctor from the Duke University School of Law and Master of Business Administration from The Fuqua School of Business, a Master of Divinity from Princeton Theological Seminary and a Bachelor of Arts from Spelman College. At Duke Law, she was also editor-in-chief of the Duke Journal of Gender Law & Policy.

== Writer ==
Her first book, Double Outsiders, was published in 2007 by JIST Works and was recognized by an Axiom Business Book Award the following year.

She blogs on Mashable, contributed to True/Slant and was a columnist for Examiner.com. She has frequently appeared as a conference speaker. She has underlined the advent of globalization as making social media into a valuable tool for women to break through barriers and influence change.

== Works ==
- Double Outsiders; JIST Works (2007) ISBN 1-59357-386-3
- Troubling Her: A Biblical Defense of Women in Ministry; JFC Publishing (2010) ISBN 9780578034546
