= Grown Woman (Kelly Rowland song) =

Single by Kelly Rowland
- Released: July 26, 2010
- Genre: R&B
- Length: 3:45
- Label: Universal Motown
- Songwriters: Mikkel S. Eriksen; Tor E. Hermansen; Magnus Beite; Bernt Stray; Shaffer Smith
- Producer: StarGate

Kelly Rowland singles chronology
"Rose Colored Glasses" (2010)	"Grown Woman" (2010)	"Forever and a Day" (2010)

"Grown Woman" is a song by American singer Kelly Rowland, recorded during the recording sessions for her third studio album Here I Am (2011). It was written by singer-songwriter Ne-Yo as well as Magnus Beite and Bernt Stray, and co-written and produced by Norwegian duo StarGate. The mid-tempo R&B song's lyrics revolve around Rowland "assert[ing] her maturity and clue[ing] her suitors in on what won’t fly when it comes to relationships." It was conceived after Rowland approached Ne-Yo to work on her third album, and asked for a record which would declare she's grown. "Grown Woman" was described by critics as different from what is normally called R&B.

It was serviced to Rhythmic, Urban, and Urban AC stations in the United States on June 29, 2010 as one of two lead singles for Here I Am It was also released for digital download in some parts of Europe, Canada, and the United States on July 26, 2010. It was moderately successful across the airplay formats as it debuted on the US Hot R&B/Hip-Hop Chart at number eighty-seven, just two days after being serviced to radio. In subsequent weeks, the single peaked at number fifty-one. An accompanying music video for "Grown Woman" was reported to have been filmed in mid-late August 2010, but has not yet been released. Despite being moderately successful, "Grown Woman" was later excluded from Here I Am.

== Background ==
Following the announcement that Rowland's international lead single, "Commander", would not be released in the United States, a new single, penned by Ne-Yo, was announced as the new American lead single. Titled "Shake Them Haters Off", the up-tempo song sees Rowland "flexing her muscles." However, those plans were changed once again when, on June 11, 2010, "Shake Them Haters Off" was replaced with two new lead singles. On June 29, 2010, "Rose Colored Glasses" was sent to Top 40/Mainstream radio stations as a pop single, and also released for digital download on the same day. "Grown Woman" was also sent to radio on June 29, but to Rhythmic, Urban, and Urban AC radio stations. The single cover was revealed on June 17, 2010 via Rowland's official website. Rap Up called the cover "grown and sexy." It was released for download on July 27, 2010 in the United States.

== Lyrics and composition ==
Kelly Rowland "Grown Woman" (2010)
A 23 second sample the chorus where Rowland declares "I'm such a grown ass woman..."

"Grown Woman" is an urban R&B song written by Ne-Yo, Magnus Beite, Bernt Stray, and Norwegian production team StarGate (who also produced the song). Jeremy Helligar of True/Slant commented the song was "still to the left of what normally passes for modern R&B." Originally revealed as "Grown Ass Woman" and later changed to "Grown Woman," the lyrics and theme of the song are based on a woman who "asserts her maturity and clues her suitors in on what won’t fly when it comes to relationships." The song is one of three records which Ne-Yo co-wrote for Rowland after the singer specifically approached him to pen records for her album. Its concept was devised in a brief conversation between the pair. Rowland said, "'Ne-Yo asked me what I wanted to talk about,' and I replied 'I'm in a different space. Change is very comfortable for me, and I'm happy where I am'. [I] want a record that declared that I'm Grown!"

== Radio and chart performance ==
The single was officially available for airplay on June 29, 2010. Two days later, it made its US chart debut on the Hot R&B/Hip-Hop Songs chart at number eighty-seven. Additionally, during the first week of radio adds, "Grown Woman" became the number one added song to Urban adult contemporary stations. As a result, the song made its debut on the US Hot Urban AC Airplay Chart at number thirty-three and rose nineteen places on the Hot R&B/Hip-Hop Songs chart to number sixty-eight. Since then, it has gone on to peak at number twenty-two on the Urban AC Airplay chart, having amassed about 920,000+ audience impressions. It has also peaked on the Urban Contemporary Airplay chart at number thirty-two.

== Music video and promotion ==
Rowland told New York station 103.5 KTU FM that the music video for "Grown Woman" was due to be filmed in the last week of July 2010. The filming of the video was rescheduled to the weekend beginning August 21, 2010 in Los Angeles. It is currently unknown if the clip was filmed or if it will be released. Rowland did, however, perform the song live for the first time at Ne-Yo's post-American Music Awards Vevo party on November 21, 2010.

== Charts ==
Chart (2010)	Peak position
US Hot R&B/Hip-Hop Songs (Billboard)	51

== Release history ==
Release dates and formats for "Grown Woman"
Region	Date	Format(s)	Label(s)	Ref.
United States	June 29, 2010	Rhythmic contemporary radio; urban adult contemporary radio; urban contemporary radio	Universal Motown	
Belgium	July 26, 2010	Digital download	Universal Music	
Italy	July 26, 2010	Digital download	Universal Music	
Sweden	July 26, 2010	Digital download	Universal Music	
Canada	July 27, 2010	Digital download	Universal Music	
United States	July 27, 2010	Digital download	Universal Motown	
Norway	August 2, 2010	Digital download	Universal Music	
Netherlands	August 13, 2010	Digital download	Universal Music	
