= True/Slant =

Defunct American online newspaper

- Website type: Online newspaper
- Available in: English
- Founded: April 2009; 17 years ago
- Dissolved: July 31, 2010; 16 years ago
- Headquarters: New York City, New York, U.S.
- Founder: Lewis Dvorkin
- Key people: Lewis Dvorkin, CEO
- Services: Content Creation & Content Publishing
- Employees: 5
- Launched: April 2009; 17 years ago
- Current status: Defunct

True/Slant (T/S) was an original content news network. It was based in a loft in SoHo in New York City funded with $3 million in capital by Forbes Media and Fuse Capital. It was acquired by Forbes in May 2010.

It launched its alpha in April 2009, and its beta in June 2009. It had a new approach to journalistic entrepreneurship and advertising, and blended journalism with social networking.

After operating for slightly more than 12 months, True/Slant ceased operations on July 31, 2010.

== Management ==
Lewis Dvorkin was its founder & Chief Executive Officer. He picked its name off a list of compound names generated by a web developer. He was previously a Senior Vice President, Programming, at AOL, responsible for News, Sports, and Network Programming, as well as an Executive Editor at Forbes magazine, Page One Editor of The Wall Street Journal, a Senior Editor at Newsweek, and an editor at The New York Times. Andrea Spiegel served as Chief Product Officer for True/Slant. Prior to T/S she was a Vice President at AOL focusing on programming, product, social media and mobile, and also a Show Producer for the Fox Television tabloid newsmagazine A Current Affair. Coates Bateman was True/Slant's Executive Director, Content & Programming. He was previously an Executive Producer at AOL News, and an editor at Random House.

== Contributors ==
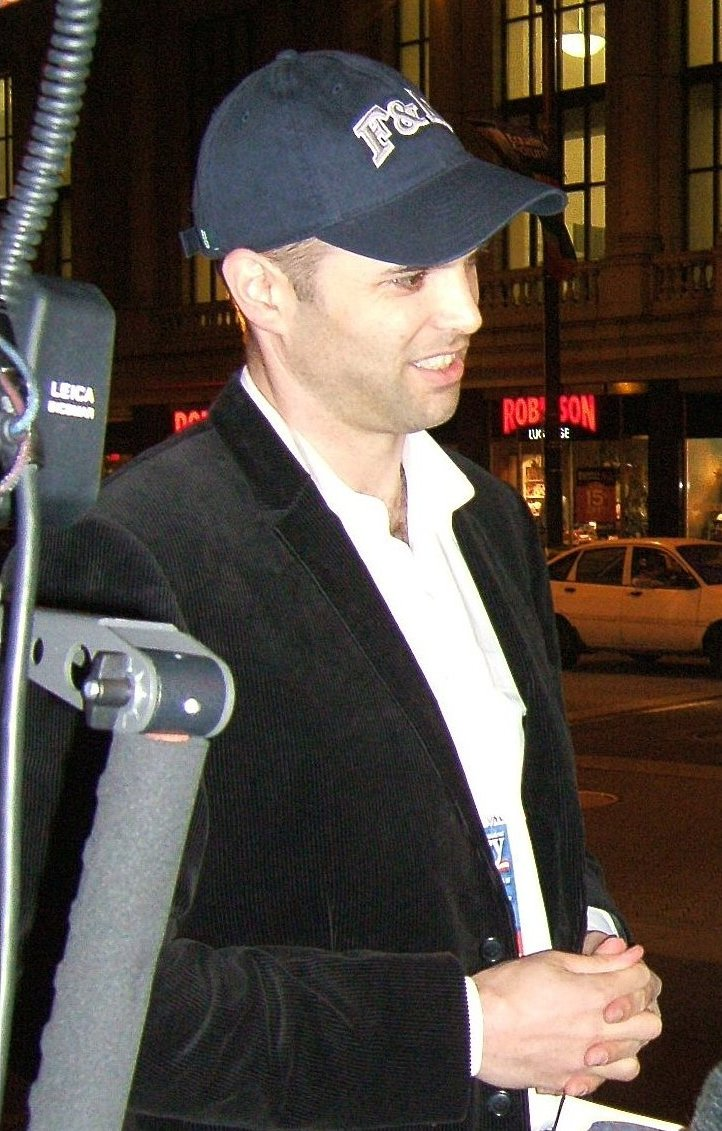
Contributor Matt Taibbi

Among its contributors were Matt Taibbi, Susannah Breslin, Jessica Faye Carter, Katty Kay, Dawn Reiss, Lou Carlozo, Jeff Hoard, Caitlin Kelly, Allison Kilkenny, Brendan Coffey, Miles O'Brien, Erik Reece, Jeffrey L. Seglin, and Claire Shipman. Its initial group of contributors included current or former writers for The New York Times, Time, Financial Times, Rolling Stone, and The Boston Globe.

Contributors were paid, but also offered a share of the advertising and sponsorship revenues their individual pages generate and, in some cases, equity in the publication. They are also permitted to keep writing other material elsewhere, and even to promote those outside efforts through True/Slant.

Contributors were required to engage with readers by posting a minimum number of comments in reader discussions about their articles and curate the comments. This was an effort to capture some of the excitement of a social network.

True/Slant promoted not only the most popular contributors, but also the most active ones. High rankings could lead to higher traffic on a contributor's page, and therefore to higher income.

== History ==
True/Slant launched with 65 journalists, assigned to specific topics, and six full-time staffers. Each contributor received a page to house their journalism. Each page featured headlines of stories elsewhere on the web selected by the journalists, which linked back to the originating outside site. In May 2009 it had 260,000 visitors. By April 2010, it had four times that number of visitors per month, roughly the same as The Village Voice or The Charlotte Observer (it was up to 1.5 million by May 2010), and more than 300 part-time contributors. It was generating more than 125 pieces of content a day.

In May 2010, Forbes bought T/S. PaidContent estimated that the deal was in the "low single digit millions." In June 2010, Dvorkin announced his intention to open up its web site to thousands of unpaid contributors. On July 29, 2010, writer Neal Ungerleider announced in a post on the site that True/Slant is "winding down operations at the end of July."

== Select coverage ==
- Blogger Kashmir Hill from T/S discovered a change to the status of Mark Zuckerberg's Facebook page, which allowed friends of his friends to see about 300 of his previously private photos. Facebook spokesperson Barry Schnitt told T/S that Zuckerberg changed his photo privacy based on site recommendations.
- Lisa Todorovich wrote on T/S that if Warren Beatty's claims to have slept with 13,000 women is true, "Beatty would have had to have been with one woman every 2.06 days since birth." But not counting his first 14 years and his years of marriage: "That leaves us with one woman every 1.17 days from age 14 to age 55."
- When Carlos "Omar" Almonte, arrested on terrorism charges in June 2010, was found to have been caught in a photo demonstrating with a sign that said "DEATH TO ALL JUICE", True/Slant featured the photo in an article entitled "Meet America's Dumbest Jihadis", with the caption: "Carlos Almonte: The only thing he hates more than Jews is English class".

== See also ==
- "Mossberg: True/Slant Revolutionizes Reporting", The Wall Street Journal, April 9, 2009
- "Journalister blir merkevare", June 9, 2009
- "Sitio lanza a periodistas como ´marcas´", CNN Expansion, June 8, 2009
