= Forever and a Day (Kelly Rowland song) =

Single by Kelly Rowland

from the album Here I Am
- Released: September 20, 2010
- Recorded: 2010
- Studio: Jeberg Studios (Copenhagen, Denmark)
- Genre: Europop; dance-pop
- Length: 3:34
- Label: Universal Motown
- Songwriters: Jonas Jeberg; Andre Merritt; Kelly Rowland; Samuel Watters
- Producer: Jonas Jeberg

Kelly Rowland singles chronology
"Grown Woman" (2010)	"Forever and a Day" (2010)	"Invincible" (2010)

"Forever and a Day" is a song by American recording artist Kelly Rowland. Written by Rowland, Andre Merritt, Samual Watters, and Jonas Jeberg, the uptempo Europop song is the second international single (fourth overall) taken from her third studio album, Here I Am (2011). It was produced and record by Jeberg at his personal recording studios in Copenhagen, Denmark.

"Forever and a Day" received its world premiere on BBC Radio 1's Live Lounge on August 18, 2010, and was released for digital download on September 20, 2010. Critics mainly praised the song for Rowland's vocals, as well as an infectious and refreshing production which uses Europop melodies, guitar riffs, and Glee-like handclaps. An accompanying music video, directed by Sarah Chatfield, features the iPad interface and scenes of Rowland partying with friends in Los Angeles. The single was considerably less successful than its predecessor, "Commander", only managing to peak in the UK at number forty-nine.

== Background and composition ==
In an interview with the German editor of her official website, Rowland has said that "On and On" (produced by Brian Kennedy) or the Pitbull-assisted "Take Everything", written by Jim Jonsin, were considered for release as second international singles. However, on August 18, 2010, UK station BBC Radio 1 announced that "Forever and a Day" was the name of Rowland's new single and subsequently played the record for the first time.

Kelly Rowland "Forever and a Day" (2010)
A sample of the chorus, where Kelly Rowland's vocals soar amongst the subtle guitar riffs and Glee-like handclaps.

"Forever and a Day" is an up-tempo Europop song which makes use of a "subtle guitar riff" and "Glee-like handclaps." The song was written by Rowland, Jonas Jeberg, Andre Merrit, and Sam Watters. Jeberg produced the song at his personal recording studios in Copenhagen, Denmark. Rowland uses auto-tuning on some of her vocals in the song.

== Critical reception ==
Becky Bain of Idolator praised the song, saying, "Kelly totally rips it wide open on the chorus with her shrieking-but-not-shrill 'DAAAAY!' Once again, David Guetta + Kelly Rowland = musical gold. If we're lucky, this will also be a US single, but we know how infrequently mass American [sic] takes a liking to Europop tunes." Robert Copsey of Digital Spy agreed, saying that the song was "nothing less than was expected." He awarded the song four out of five stars, saying that the song could not top "Commander" but "comes pretty close." It "[uses] beats that bounce faster than a chesty lady on a high-powered jetski. It all makes for another infectious club-pop number on which Kel is refreshingly direct with her fella." Not all reviews were positive. Rick Fullton of the Daily Record was much less impressed with the song, saying it could have "been a session singer" instead of the "dance diva" Rowland is intending on becoming. A reviewer from StarObserver praised the dance remix of the song. The review said, "French DJ Antoine Clamaran has turned K Row’s mid-tempo jam into the perfect summer anthem – with killer beats, an uplifting chorus and suitably cheesy video (below)."

== Release and promotion ==
Following its premiere, "Forever and a Day" was added to the A-playlist on UK urban music radio on September 10, 2010. On September 15, 2010, "Forever and a Day" was added to B-playlist on the UK's mainstream radio station, BBC Radio 1. It was due to be released in the UK on September 27, 2010, but for unspecified reasons the release was delayed by a week to October 4, 2010. Rowland performed "Forever and a Day" for the first time on The Alan Titchmarsh Show on October 7, 2010. Following its release, the single debuted on the UK Singles Chart at number forty-nine, but then fell to number sixty-one the following week. On October 23, 2010, the single debuted on the Belgium Flanders Tip chart at number forty-nine before peaking at number forty-two weeks later. The single also peaked at number seventy-three on the Slovak Airplay Chart. At the end of October 2010, Rowland performed the new Antoine Clamaran dance remix of the song at the Starfloor 2010 music festival in Paris, France.

== Music video ==
=== Background and concept ===
The opening scene of the video, showing the use of the iPad interface which is present throughout the clip

The music video was filmed from August 20 to 22, 2010, and was directed by British pop-culture and video director Sarah Chatfield. The full completed video debuted on the Vevo network, and was added to UK music channels on September 15, 2010. It was released in other territories on September 25, 2010. The scenes were put together with superimposed images of the workings and interface of the iPad. It was released through the US iTunes Store on September 21, 2010. Video Static's Steven Gottlieb provided clarity on how the interface is integrated into the video. He said, "Logos get tapped to trigger various edits; pinching makes things zoom in and out, etc, etc." A video set to the Antoine Clamaran dance remix of the song premiered on Clamaran's official YouTube page on December 8, 2010.

=== Synopsis ===
The video begins with a still photo of Rowland and a "slide-lock" function from the iPad in the foreground. A single finger appears and unlocks the image by sliding the slider from left to right. The music begins and four small images appear on screen. The finger reappears and clicks on the third image, resulting in that image zooming to fit the whole screen. In this scene, Rowland wears an orange knee-length skirt, T-shirt, and a blue cropped denim jacket. She walks around on a rooftop in Los Angeles. The video then flicks between this scene and another where she is seen partying with her friends. As the chorus begins, Rowland and her friends are seen riding in a convertible car. Then they are seen sitting on some concrete stairs as some skate-boarders ride past them. When the bridge kicks in, the images flicker to a party scene on a rooftop with lots of people enjoying themselves. The finger then re-appears and clicks on the scroll bar, which appears on screen as if to rewind the clip and the original scene of Rowland alone on the rooftop plays as the music fades.

=== Reception ===
A review from Idolator said that the futuristic theme to the video might have been better suited to the previous international single, "Commander". It also said, "The pop diva continues her ascent to grown woman in this sun-soaked video, making good use of palm trees, a convertible, and the Los Angeles skyline," commenting that she takes "a breezy approach so casual it almost does look like a camera crew just happened to stumble upon a typical day out with the girls." The reviewer concluded that "it's hard to imagine better uses for a touch screen than getting as close as possible to the carefree fun on display here." Steven Gottlieb of Video Static said, "['Forever and a Day' is] a casual and sunny pop video gets a bit of a twist, or a flick, via an interface that's swiped from your iPhone...It's possibly not the kind of finger manipulation some Kelly Rowland fans have been dreaming about, but even they should admit it's a clever conceit."

== Track listing ==
- Digital download
1. "Forever and a Day" – 3:34
- Official Remix Single
1. "Forever and a Day" (Antoine Clamaran Remix Edit) – 3:38
- Digital Remixes EP
1. "Forever and a Day" (Mantronix Remix) – 5:39
2. "Forever and a Day" (Donaeo Dub Remix) – 7:14
3. "Forever and a Day" (Donaeo Remix) – 7:14

== Credits and personnel ==
Credits are adapted from the liner notes of Here I Am.

- Kelly Rowland – lead vocals, backing vocals, songwriting
- Andre Merritt – backing vocals, songwriting
- Victoria Akintola – backing vocals
- Tim Roberts – engineering assistance
- John Hanes – engineering
- Serban Ghenea – mixing
- Jonas Jeberg – production, songwriting, recording, instrumentation, programming
- Sam Watters – songwriting

== Charts ==
Weekly chart performance for "Forever and a Day"
Chart (2010)	Peak position
Belgium (Ultratip Bubbling Under Flanders)	40
Scottish Singles Sales (Official Charts)	43
Slovakia Airplay (ČNS IFPI)	64
South Korea International (Gaon)	98
UK Singles (Official Charts)	49

== Release history ==
Release dates and formats for "Forever and a Day"
Region	Date	Version(s)	Format(s)	Label(s)	Ref.
United Kingdom	August 18, 2010	Original	Streaming	Universal Island	
United Kingdom	September 10, 2010	Original	Urban contemporary radio	Universal Island	
United Kingdom	September 15, 2010	Original	Contemporary hit radio	Universal Island	
Belgium	September 17, 2010	Original	Digital download	Universal Music	
Denmark	September 17, 2010	Original	Digital download	Universal Music	
Sweden	September 20, 2010	Original	Digital download	Universal Music	
Ireland	September 24, 2010	Original	Digital download	Universal Music	
Australia	October 8, 2010	Original	Digital download	Universal Music	
Switzerland	October 8, 2010	Original	Digital download	Universal Music	
Italy	October 11, 2010	Original	Digital download	Universal Music	
Ireland	October 24, 2010	Remixes	Digital download (EP)	Universal Music	
United Kingdom	October 24, 2010	Remixes	Digital download (EP)	Universal Island	
France	November 15, 2010	Antoine Clamaran remix	Digital download	Barclay	
France	November 18, 2010	Antoine Clamaran remix	Contemporary hit radio	Barclay	
