= Sarah Chatfield =

English music video director

Sarah Chatfield is an English music video director, based in London and Los Angeles. She is represented by UK production company Outsider. Her video for Lily Allen's single Alfie, earned her Best New Director and Best Pop video at the CAD awards. Music videos directed by Chatfield include Lykke Li ("Breaking It Up"), Lenka ("Heart Skips a Beat"), and Kelly Rowland ("Motivation").

In 2008, she created a fashion film with fellow Colonel Blimp director Chris Sweeney for Yves Saint Laurent, which replaced their traditional menswear presentation. The team collaborated again with YSL the following year to create seven short film pieces to replace the Spring/Summer catwalk show. The films were displayed on giant screens at the Musée de l'Homme as part of fashion week. She is also currently represented by the LA-based production company Station.
