= List of songs recorded by Kelly Rowland =

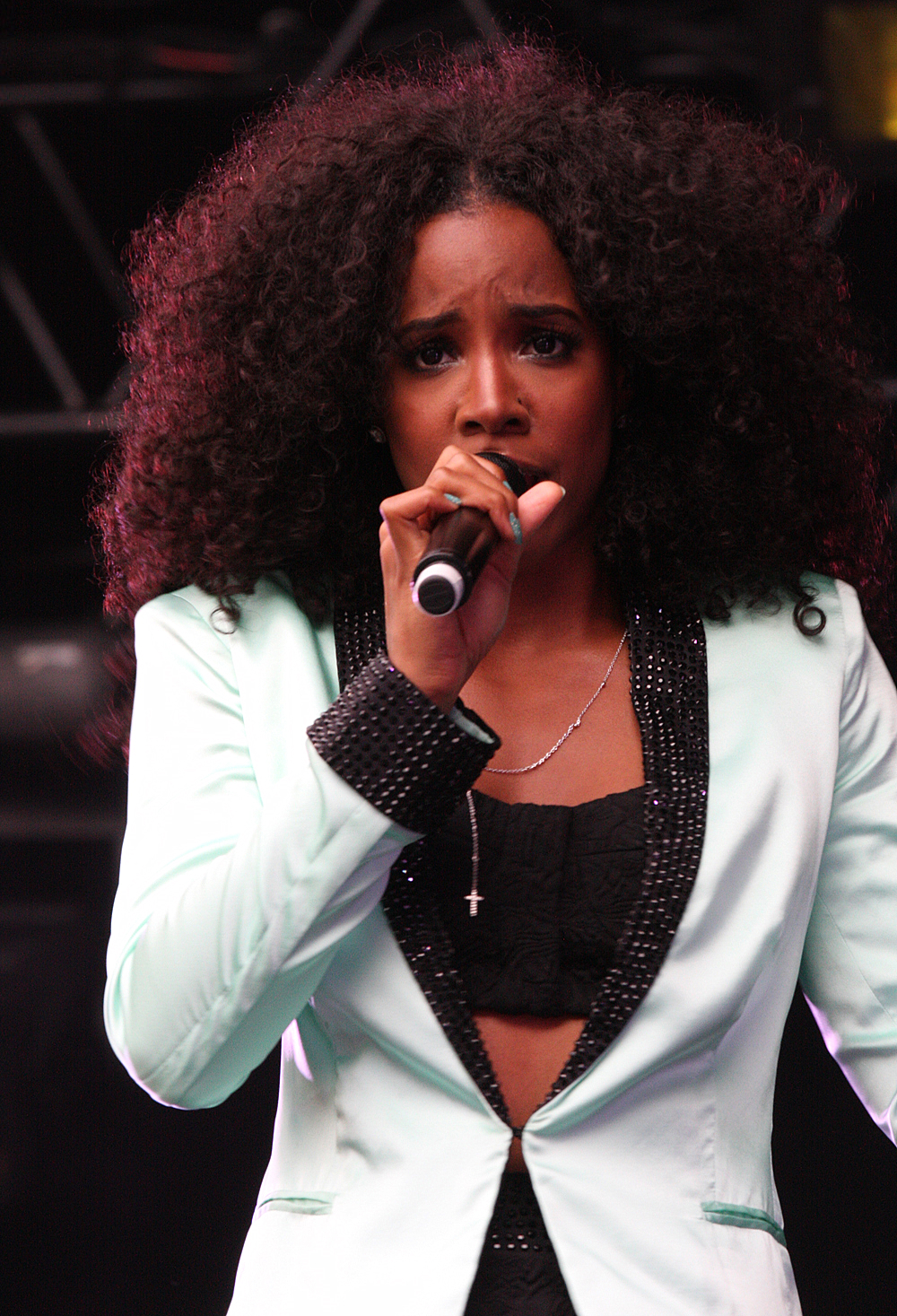
Rowland performing in 2012

American singer Kelly Rowland has recorded songs for her four studio albums and has collaborated with other artists for duets and featured songs on their respective albums and charity singles. Her discography as a solo artist began in 2000 on the remix of R&B recording artist Avant's single "Separated". It also includes three studio albums (and an upcoming fourth album), two compilation albums, one box set, two extended plays, thirty-seven singles, including thirteen as a featured artist and five promotional singles, and two charted songs.

During the hiatus of Destiny's Child, Rowland released her debut solo album Simply Deep in 2002, which contained influences of alternative-R&B and rock music. It included her joint worldwide number-one single "Dilemma" with rapper Nelly, as well as the singles "Stole", "Can't Nobody" and "Train on a Track". Following Destiny's Child's disbandment, Rowland prepared her next studio album initially under the title My Story. However this was revamped and finally released in 2007 as Ms. Kelly. It featured the lead single, "Like This" with Eve, and the international hit single "Work". A third single "Ghetto", with Snoop Dogg, was also released, while the re-release spawned another single, "Daylight", with Travis McCoy.

In 2009, Columbia Records ended their contract with Rowland. Since then, Rowland worked on a number of collaborations with European singers; most notably French singer Nâdiya, Italian singer Tiziano Ferro, and French DJ David Guetta. Rowland collaborated with Guetta for several songs on his One Love album. This included Rowland's feature on the worldwide dance hit "When Love Takes Over". In 2010, Rowland released "Everywhere You Go" (with Rhythm of Africa) for the 2010 FIFA World Cup, recorded a version of "Wonderful Christmastime" for the album Now That's What I Call Christmas! 4, and featured on UK grime artist Tinie Tempah's single "Invincible", taken from his debut album Disc-Overy.

== Released songs ==
List of songs recorded by Kelly Rowland
Song	Artist(s)	Writer(s)	Album(s)	Year	Ref.
"#1"	Kelly Rowland	Marquel Middlebrooks; Kelly Rowland; Michael L. Williams II	Talk a Good Game	2013	
"Ain't No Mountain High Enough"	Michael Bolton featuring Kelly Rowland	Nickolas Ashford; Valerie Simpson	Ain't No Mountain High Enough: A Tribute to Hitsville U.S.A.	2013	
"All of the Night"	Kelly Rowland featuring Rico Love	Luther Campbell; David Hobbs; Rico Love; Mark D. Ross; Christopher Wongwon; Jermaine Jackson; Andrew Harr; David Anderson II; Jon-David Anderson	Here I Am	2011	
"All That I'm Lookin For"	Kitten Sera featuring Kelly Rowland & Beyoncé Knowles	—N/a	The Katrina CD	2005	
"All the Way"	R. Kelly featuring Kelly Rowland	Robert Kelly; Sly Jordan	Black Panties	2013	
"Angel"	Kelly Rowland	Beyoncé Knowles; Rob Fusari	Down to Earth	2001	
"Better"	Kelly Rowland	Monique Lawrence; Moelogo Motrakz; Kelly Rowland	K	2021	
"Better Without You"	Kelly Rowland	Charles Bereal; Kenneth Bereal; Lonny Bereal; Charmelle Cofield	Ms. Kelly	2007	
"Beyond Imagination"	Kelly Rowland	Solange Knowles; Damon Elliott; Romeo Antonio	Simply Deep	2002	
"Black Magic"	Kelly Rowland	Sak Pase; Kelly Rowland; Ebo Taylor	K	2021	
"Boo Thang"	Verse Simmonds featuring Kelly Rowland	Shama E. Joseph; Ashlee Chanel Ross; Maurice Simmonds	non-album release	2011	
"Breathe Gentle"	Tiziano Ferro featuring Kelly Rowland	Tiziano Ferro; Billy Mann; Ivano Fossati	Alla mia età	2008	
"Broken"	Kelly Rowland	Joseph Bereal; Tim Blacksmith; Mikkel S. Eriksen; Tor Erik Hermansen; Tariano Jackson; Kelly Rowland	Ms. Kelly: Diva Deluxe	2008	
"Can't Nobody"	Kelly Rowland	Rich Harrison; Robert Reed; Tony Fisher	Simply Deep	2002	
"Castle Made of Sand"	Pitbull featuring Kelly Rowland and Jamie Drastik	Armando C. Perez; Justin Franks; Jacob Luttrell; Julie Frost; Kelly Rowland; James Huy	Planet Pit	2011	
"Choose"	David Guetta featuring Ne-Yo & Kelly Rowland	Frédéric Riesterer; Shaffer Smith	One Love	2009	
"Coffee"	Kelly Rowland	Nick Green; Marcos Palacious; Kelly Rowland; Syd the Kid	non-album release	2020	
"Comeback"	Kelly Rowland	Jason Boyd; Lyndrea Price; Kelly Rowland; Scott Storch	Ms. Kelly	2007	
"Commander"	Kelly Rowland and Method Man	David Guetta; Rico Love; Kelly Rowland; Sandy Wilhelm	Here I Am	2011	
"Complicated"	Kelly Rowland and Method Man	Jack Dine; Kelly Rowland; Jessie Reyez; Clifford Smith, Jr. Algernod Washington	non-album release	2026	
"Conceited"	Kelly Rowland	—N/a	non-album release	2016	
"Crazy"	Kelly Rowland	Ricky Reed; Kelly Rowland; Toby Wincorn; Theron Thomas	K	2020	
"Crown"	Kelly Rowland	Kyle Coleman; Edgar Etienne; Colby O'Donis; Kelly Rowland; Varren Wade	non-album release	2019	
"Daylight"	Kelly Rowland featuring Travis McCoy	Bobby Womack; Harold Payne	Ms. Kelly: Diva Deluxe	2008	
"Diamonds"	Kelly Rowland	Fabian Mazur; Jeffrey Ampofo Nuamah; Kelly Rowland; Alexandra Grace Saad; Wayne Wright	The Kelly Rowland Edition	2019	
"Dilemma"	Nelly featuring Kelly Rowland	Cornell Iral Haynes Jr. Bunny Sigler; Kenny Gamble	Simply Deep	2002	
"Dirty Laundry"	Kelly Rowland	Carlos McKinney; Terius Nash; Kelly Rowland	Talk a Good Game	2013	
"Do Like That (Remix)"	Korede Bello featuring Kelly Rowland	—N/a	non-album release	2017	
"Don't You Worry"	Kelly Rowland	Brittany Dickinson; Fabian Mazur; Jeffrey Ampofo Nuamah; Kelly Rowland; Alexandra Grace Saad; Wayne Wright	The Kelly Rowland Edition	2019	
"Down for Whatever"	Kelly Rowland featuring The WAV.s	Nadir Khayat; Teddy Sky; Jimmy Joker; Bilal Hajji	Here I Am	2011	
"Down On Love"	Kelly Rowland featuring Kevin Cossom	David Anderson; Jon-David Anderson; Kevin Cossom; Andrew Harr; Jermaine Jackson; Kelly Rowland	Talk a Good Game	2013	
"Dumb"	Kelly Rowland	PointGuard; Kelly Rowland	non-album release	2015	
"Each Other"	Kelly Rowland	Rico Love; Karriem Mack; Shaun Owens; Nigel Talley; Maurice Wade	Here I Am	2011	
"Every Thought Is You"	Kelly Rowland	Lonny Bereal; Shalondra Buckines; Loren Dawson; Billy Mann; Huy Nguyen; Kelly Rowland; Dana Stinson	Ms. Kelly	2007	
"Everytime You Walk Out That Door"	Kelly Rowland	Mark J. Feist; Damon Sharpe	Simply Deep	2002	
"Everywhere You Go"	Kelly Rowland featuring Rhythm of Africa United	Stacy Barthe	non-album release	2010	
"Favor"	Lonny Bereal featuring Kelly Rowland	Ester Dean; Rickey Deleon; Dee1; Lonny Bereal	The Love Train	2011	
"Feelin' Me Right Now"	Kelly Rowland	Rico Love; Earl Hood; Eric Goudy II	Here I Am	2011	
"Feet to the Fire"	Kelly Rowland featuring Pharrell	Kelly Rowland; Pharrell Williams	Talk a Good Game	2013	
"Finally (Cannot Hide It)"	Amorphous featuring Kelly Rowland & CeCe Peniston	Uzoechi Emenike; CeCe Peniston; Elbert Lee Linnea; Felipe Delgado; Jahaan Sweet; Jimir Reece Davis; Kelly Rowland	non-album release	2021	
"Flashback"	Kelly Rowland	Charles Bereal; Kenneth Bereal; Lonny Bereal; Huy Nguyen; Britney Jackson; Kelly Rowland	Ms. Kelly	2007	
"Flowers"	Kelly Rowland	Sam Dew; Kelly Rowland; Nesbitt Wesonga	K	2021	
"Follow Your Destiny"	Kelly Rowland	Courtney Harrell; Cookie Lewis; Rob Lewis	The Seat Filler	2004	
"Forever and a Day"	Kelly Rowland	Jonas Jeberg; Andre Merritt; Kelly Rowland; Samual Watters	Here I Am	2011	
"Freak"	Kelly Rowland	Marcella Araica; Nathaniel Hills; Rico Love	Talk a Good Game	2013	
"Get It"	Busta Rhymes featuring Missy Elliott & Kelly Rowland	Trevor Smith Jr. Shondrae Crawford; Melissa Elliott; Karin Briscoe	non-album release	2018	
"Ghetto"	Kelly Rowland featuring Snoop Dogg	Durrell Babbs; Lonny Bereal; Calvin Broadus	Ms. Kelly	2007	
"Gimme Love"	Kelly Rowland	Melvin Hough; Kelly Rowland; Maurice Simmonds; Theron Thomas	non-album release	2016	
"Girl Gang"	Ciara featuring Kelly Rowland	Ciara Harris; Pierre Medor; Tricky Stewart; Colby Green	Beauty Marks	2019	
"Gone"	Kelly Rowland featuring Wiz Khalifa	Courtney Harrell; Joni Mitchell; Kelly Rowland; Harmony Samuels; Amber Streeter; Cameron Thomaz	Talk a Good Game	2013	
"Gone"	Nelly featuring Kelly Rowland	Cornell Haynes Jr. Richard Butler; James Scheffer; Earl Hood; Eric Goody II	5.0	2011	
"Gotsta Go (Part I)"	Kelly Rowland featuring Da Brat	Charles Bereal; Kenneth Bereal; Lonny Bereal; Angela Beyince; S. Harris; Kelly Rowland	Ms. Kelly	2007	
"Grown Woman"	Kelly Rowland	Magnus Beite; Mikkel S. Eriksen; Tor Erik Hermansen; Shaffer Smith; Bernt Stray	non-album release	2010	
"Gutter"	The Game featuring Kelly Rowland	—N/a	Murda Game Chronicles	2007	
"Haters"	Kelly Rowland	Charles Harmon; Shaffer Smith	—N/a	2010	
"H'bibi I Love You"	Amine featuring Kelly Rowland	—N/a	Ms. Kelly	2007	
"Have Your Way"	Kelly Rowland featuring Beyoncé Knowles	Fred Jenkins III; Beyoncé Knowles; Kelendria Rowland	His Woman His Wife	2000	
"Haven't Told You"	Kelly Rowland	Anders Barrén; Jany Schella; Jeanette Olsson	Simply Deep	2002	
"Heaven"	Kelly Rowland	Taura Jackson; Alonzo Jackson; Todd Mushaw; Kelly Rowland	Simply Deep	2002	
"Heaven & Earth"	Kelly Rowland	Mikkel S. Eriksen; Tor Erik Hermansen; Shaffer Smith	Here I Am	2011	
"Here We Go"	Trina featuring Kelly Rowland	Katrina Taylor; Derrick Baker; Josh Burke; Jimmy Jam; Terry Lewis; Theodore Lucas; Teedra Moses; James Scheffer; Steven Scipio	Glamorest Life	2005	
"Hitman"	Kelly Rowland	Sam Dew; Warren Felder; Fela Kuti; Alex Niceforo; Kelly Rowland; Keith Sorrells	K	2021	
"Honey"	Adrian Marcel featuring Kelly Rowland	Shawn Carter; LaDamon Douglas; Barry Gibb; Maurice Gibb; Robin Gibb; Robert Kelly	non-album release	2014	
"How Deep Is Your Love"	Sean Paul featuring Kelly Rowland	Mikkel S. Eriksen; Jason Henriques; Ester Dean; Sean Paul Henriques	Tomahawk Technique	2012	
"I Get It"	Kelly Rowland	Kris Bowers; Justin Simien	Bad Hair	2020	
"I Know What You Did Last Summer"	Jacob Whitesides featuring Kelly Rowland	Sash Banks; Melody Federer	non-album release	2015	
"I Need a Love"	Kelly Rowland	Courtney Harrell; Cookie Lewis; Rob Lewis	The Seat Filler	2004	
"I Remember"	Kelly Rowland	Ben Diehl; Kevin Cossom; Andrew Harr; Jermaine Jackson; Kelly Rowland	Talk a Good Game	2013	
"I'm Beginning to See the Light"	Kelly Rowland	Duke Ellington; Don George; Johnny Hodges; Harry James	Mona Lisa Smile	2004	
"I'm Dat Chick"	Kelly Rowland	Christopher Stewart; Ester Dean; Lamont Neuble	Here I Am	2011	
"Ice"	Kelly Rowland featuring Lil Wayne	Dwayne Carter; Sean Garrett; Kelly Rowland; Noel "Detail" Fisher	non-album release	2012	
"Interlude"	Kelly Rowland	Lonny Bereal; Kenneth Karlin; Billy Mann; Lyndrea Price; Kelly Rowland; Carsten Schack	Ms. Kelly	2007	
"Interlude: I Got So Much Magic, You Can Have It"	Solange featuring Kelly Rowland and Nia Andrews	Solange Knowles	A Seat at the Table	2016	
"Invincible"	Tinie Tempah featuring Kelly Rowland	Eshraque "iSHi" Mughal; Patrick Okogwu; Phillipe-Marc Anquetil	Disc-Overy	2010	
"It's the Way You Love Me"	David Guetta featuring Kelly Rowland	Miriam Nervo; Olivia Nervo; Frédéric Riesterer	One Love	2009	
"Keep It Between Us"	Kelly Rowland	J. J-Doe Smith; Lonny Bereal; Sevyn Streeter; Kelly Rowland; Christopher Umana	Here I Am	2011	
"Kelly"	Kelly Rowland	Denisia Andrews; Brittany Coney; Kelly Rowland	non-album release	2018	
"Kisses Down Low"	Kelly Rowland	Marquel Middlebrooks; Timothy Thomas; Theron Thomas; Kelly Rowland; Michael Williams	Talk a Good Game	2013	
"Lay It on Me"	Kelly Rowland featuring Big Sean	Sean Anderson; Ester Dean; Chauncey Hollis	Here I Am	2011	
"Let Me Love You"	Pusha T featuring Kelly Rowland	J. Glass; Nick Johnsen; Terius Nash; Terrence Thornton; Jeppe Thybo	My Name Is My Name	2013	
"Like This"	Kelly Rowland featuring Eve	Sean Garrett; Eve Jeffers; Jamal Jones; Jason Perry; Kelly Rowland; Elvis Williams	Ms. Kelly	2007	
"(Love Lives in) Strange Places"	Kelly Rowland	Billy Mann; Damon Elliott; Kelly Rowland	Simply Deep	2002	
"Love"	Kelly Rowland	Slav Vynnytsky; Marc Joseph; Solange Knowles	Ms. Kelly	2007	
"Love & Sex Part 2"	Joe featuring Kelly Rowland	Gerald Issac; Derek Allen; Alvin Garrett	Doubleback: Evolution of R&B	2014	
"Love Again"	Kelly Rowland	Charlie Bereal; Lonny Bereal; Charmelle Cofield; P. Thornton; Roy Battle; Cheyenne Jones	Ms. Kelly: Diva Deluxe	2008	
"Love Me Til I Die"	Kelly Rowland	Kelly Rowland; Mathew Samuels; Joshua Scruggs; Nikhil Seetharam; R. J. Thomas	Talk a Good Game	2013	
"Love Stand Still"	Beau Vallis featuring Kelly Rowland	—N/a	non-album release	2014	
"Love You More at Christmas Time"	Kelly Rowland	Angela Beyince; Nash Overstreet; Kelly Rowland; Shane Stevens	non-album release	2019	
"Love/Hate"	Kelly Rowland	Brandy Norwood; Blake English; Robert Smith	Simply Deep	2002	
"Make U Wanna Stay"	Kelly Rowland featuring Joe Budden	Kelly Rowland; Jovonn Alexander; Mathew Knowles; Chad Elliott; Joe Budden; Winsome Mello Singh; Adeka Stupat	Simply Deep	2002	
"Mama Told Me"	Big Boi featuring Kelly Rowland	Erik Bodin; Chris Carmouche; Ricardo Lewis, Yukimi Nagano; Shelton Oliver; Antwan Patton; Ricky Walker; Fredrik Wallin; Jeron Ward; Håkan Wirenstrand	Vicious Lies and Dangerous Rumors	2012	
"Mine Games"	Rick Ross featuring Kelly Rowland	—N/a	Rich Forever	2012	
"Mommy's Little Baby"	Kelly Rowland	—N/a	non-album release	2014	
"Mona Lisa"	Kelly Rowland	Ray Evans; Jay Livingston	Empire: Music from "Be True"	2015	
"Motivation"	Kelly Rowland featuring Lil Wayne	James Scheffer; Richard Butler Jr. Daniel Morris; Dwayne Carter	Here I Am	2011	
"Need a Reason"	Kelly Rowland featuring Future & Bei Maejor	Lonny Bereal; Kelly Rowland	Think Like a Man	2012	
"Neva End (Remix)"	Future featuring Kelly Rowland	Nayvadius Wilburn; Kelly Rowland; Michael Williams; Pierre Ramon	Pluto 3D	2012	
"No Coincidence"	Kelly Rowland	Rob Fusari; Balewa Muhammad; Sylvester Jordan	Simply Deep	2002	
"No Future in the Past"	Nâdiya featuring Kelly Rowland	Gilles Luka; Laura Mayne	Électron Libre	2008	
"No Man No Cry"	Kelly Rowland	Lauren Evans; Mark J. Feist; Damon Sharpe	Ms. Kelly: Diva Deluxe	2008	
"Obsession"	Kelly Rowland	Tory Johnson; Solange Knowles	Simply Deep	2002	
"One Life"	Madcon featuring Kelly Rowland	Tshawe Baqwa; Katerina Bramley; TJ Oosterhuis; Kelly Rowland; Yosef Wolde-Mariam	Icon	2013	
"One Night"	Kelly Rowland	—N/a	Bad Hair	2020	
"Past 12"	Kelly Rowland	Rob Fusari; Mary Brown; Falonte Moore; Balewa Muhammad; Teron Beal; Eritza Laues	Simply Deep	2002	
"Put a Little Love in Your Heart"	Gap Holiday	Jackie DeShannon; Jimmy Holiday; Randy Myers	non-album release	2003	
"Put Your Name on It"	Kelly Rowland	Courtney Harrell; Kelly Rowland; Harmony Samuels; Amber Streeter	Talk a Good Game	2013	
"Red Wine"	Kelly Rowland	Matthew Burnett; Kevin Cossom; Matthew Samuels; Kelly Rowland	Talk a Good Game	2013	
"Representin"	Ludacris featuring Kelly Rowland	Christopher Bridges; Richard Butler; James Scheffer; Frank Romano; Michael Mule; Issac De Bonni	Ludaversal	2012	
"Rose Colored Glasses"	Kelly Rowland	Ester Dean; Lukasz Gottwald	Here I Am	2011	
"Say Yes"	Michelle Williams featuring Beyoncé & Kelly Rowland	Michelle Williams; Carmen Reece; Al Sherrod Lambert; Harmony Samuels	Journey to Freedom	2014	
"See Me"	Kelly Rowland	Brittany Dickinson; Tim Moore; Jeffrey Ampofo Nuamah; Che Michael Olson; Marcus Anthony Williams; Wayne Wright	The Kelly Rowland Edition	2019	
"Separated (Remix)"	Avant featuring Kelly Rowland	Isaac Hayes; Steve Huff	non-album release	2000	
"Shady Life"	Jeezy featuring Kelly Rowland	Paul Dawson; Jay Jenkins; Kelly Rowland	Seen It All: The Autobiography	2014	
"Simply Deep"	Kelly Rowland featuring Solange Knowles	Troy Johnson; Solange Knowles	Simply Deep	2002	
"Sky Walker"	Kelly Rowland featuring The-Dream	Carlos McKinney; Terius Nash; Jamal Rashid; Kelly Rowland	Talk a Good Game	2013	
"Slow Motion"	Travis Porter featuring Kelly Rowland	—N/a	Differenter 3 (Road Trips & Big Tits)	2011	
"Stand in Front of Me"	Kelly Rowland featuring Pusha T	Kelly Rowland; Pharrell Williams	Talk a Good Game	2013	
"Still in Love with My Ex"	Kelly Rowland	Lonny Bereal; Kenneth Karlin; Billy Mann; Lyndrea Price; Kelly Rowland; Carsten Schack	Ms. Kelly	2007	
"So You Know"	Kelly Rowland featuring Justin Simien	—N/a	Bad Hair	2020	
"Speed of Love"	Kelly Rowland	Nasri Atweh; Jeff Gitelman; Kelly Rowland	K	2021	
"Stole"	Kelly Rowland	Steve Kipner; Dane Deviller; Sean Hosein	Simply Deep	2002	
"Street Life"	Kelly Rowland featuring Pusha T	Kelly Rowland; Terrence Thorton; Pharrell Williams	Talk a Good Game	2013	
"Summer Dreaming 2012"	Project B featuring Kelly Rowland	Oliver Bloch-Lainé; Kate Markowitz; Joe Hammer; Christina Trulio	non-album release	2012	
"Talk a Good Game"	Kelly Rowland featuring Kevin Cossom	Kelly Rowland; Kevin Cossom; Tyler Williams	Talk a Good Game	2013	
"The Game"	Kelly Rowland	Jake Troth; Kirby Dockery; Ellen Healy	Beats of the Beautiful Game	2014	
"That High"	Pitbull featuring Kelly Rowland	Tor Erik Hermansen; Karl Johan Schuster; Benny Blaco; Ester Dean; Armando Perez; Mikkel Storleer Eriksen	Global Warming: Meltdown	2013	
"The Show"	Kelly Rowland featuring Tank	Durrell Babbs; Lonny Bereal; Kelly Rowland	Ms. Kelly	2007	
"This Is for My Girls"	Kelly Clarkson; Chloe & Halle; Missy Elliott; Jadagrace; Lea Michele; Janelle Monáe; Kelly Rowland; Zendaya	Diane Warren	non-album release	2016	
"This Is How I Feel"	Earth, Wind & Fire featuring Kelly Rowland & Sleepy Brown	Pat Brown; Marqueze Etheridge; Ray Murray; Rico Wade	Hitch	2005	
"This Is Love"	Kelly Rowland	Billy Mann	Ms. Kelly	2007	
"This Is Love"	Kelly Rowland	Jeremy McArthur; Thabiso Nkhereanye; Myariah "Jane Handcock" Summers; Kelly Rowland	Talk a Good Game	2013	
"Train on a Track"	Kelly Rowland	Rob Fusari; Tiaa Wells; Balewa Muhammad; Sylvester Jordan	Simply Deep	2002	
"Turn It Up"	Kelly Rowland	Rodney Jerkins; Priscilla Hamilton; Thomas Lumpkins; John Conte Jr.	Here I Am	2011	
"Une femme en prison"	Stomy Bugsy featuring Kelly Rowland	Boukhit Djamel; Gilles Duarte; Isabelle Nesmon; Dimitri Jamois	4ème Round; Simply Deep	2003	
"Unity"	Kelly Rowland	Mike James; Jordan Thorsteinson; Troy Samson	Ms. Kelly: Diva Deluxe	2008	
"What Would You Do"	Kelly Rowland	—N/a	Simply Deep	2002	
"What a Feeling"	Alex Gaudino featuring Kelly Rowland	Alfonso Fortunato Gaudino; Giuseppe D'Albenzio; Emmanuel Mijares; Jenson Vaughan; Kelly Rowland; Lonny Bereal	Magnificent	2011	
"When Love Takes Over"	David Guetta featuring Kelly Rowland	Miriam Nervo; Olivia Nervo; Kelly Rowland; David Guetta; Frédéric Riesterer	One Love	2009	
"Where Have You Been"	The-Dream featuring Kelly Rowland	Terius Nash; Kelly Rowland	IV Play	2013	
"Without Me"	Fantasia featuring Kelly Rowland & Missy Elliott	Fantasia Barrino; Harmony Samuels; Al Sherrod Lambert; Missy Elliott; Kyle Stewart	Side Effects of You	2013	
"Wonderful Christmastime"	Kelly Rowland	Paul McCartney	Now That's What I Call Christmas! 4	2010	
"Wonderful Time"	Kelly Rowland and Nova Wav	Stephanie Marks	non-album release	2021	
"Work"	Kelly Rowland	Jason Boyd; Kelly Rowland; Scott Storch	Ms. Kelly	2007	
"Work It Man"	Kelly Rowland featuring Lil Playy	Rodney Jerkins; Priscilla Hamilton; LaShawn Daniels; Kelly Rowland; Darrell Davidson	Here I Am	2011	
"You Changed"	Kelly Rowland featuring Beyoncé & Michelle Williams	Courtney Harrell; Kelly Rowland; Harmony Samuels	Talk a Good Game	2013	
"You Will Win"	Kelly Rowland	Shelea Frazier; Michelle Williams; Damion Washington; James Quenton Wright	Spirit Rising Vols. 1 & 2	2006	
"Your Love (So Crazy)"	Bone Thugs-n-Harmony featuring Kelly Rowland	—N/a	Uni-5 The Prequel CD	2007	

== Unreleased songs ==
Song	Artist(s)	Writer(s)	Intended album	Ref.
"All on You"	Kelly Rowland featuring Lil Wayne	M. Linney	Ms. Kelly	
"Baby Honey Sugar"	Kelly Rowland	Angela Beyince; Kelly Rowland; Nash Overstreet; Shane Pittman; Shane Stevens	—	
"Back On"	Kelly Rowland	—	Ms. Kelly	
"Bad Habit (Part II)"	Kelly Rowland	Bryan Michael Cox; Kendrick Dean; Solange Knowles	Ms. Kelly	
"Better"	Kelly Rowland	Keri Hilson; Kenneth Karlin; Carsten Schack; Patrick Smith	—	
"Blaze"	Kelly Rowland	—	Ms. Kelly	
"Can't Do It Again"	Kelly Rowland	—	Ms. Kelly	
"Carry On"	Kygo & Kelly Rowland	Josh Cumbee; Natalie Dunn; Kyrre Gørvell-Dahll; Ilan Kidron; Afshin Salmani	—	
"Champagne & Cigars"	Kelly Rowland	M. Simmonds	—	
"Forever Is Just a Minute Away"	Kelly Rowland	Olivia Waithe; Kelly Rowland; Toby Gad	Here I Am	
"Free Fall"	Rune RK featuring Kelly Rowland	—	—	
Geranimo	Kelly Rowland	Lonny Bereal; Chris Brown; Kevin McCall; Kelly Rowland	Here I Am	
"Get Back"	Kelly Rowland	Bryan-Michael Cox; Adonis Shropshire; Kendrick Dean	Ms. Kelly	
"Hangover"	Kelly Rowland	Andre Merritt	Here I Am	
"How Deep Is Your Love"	Michael Bublé & Kelly Rowland	Barry Gibb; Robin Gibb; Maurice Gibb	—	
"Just Me"	Kelly Rowland	—	Ms. Kelly	
"Just Whisper"	Kelly Rowland	—	Here I Am	
"King of Kings"	Kelly Rowland	Miriam Nervo; Olivia Nervo; David Guetta	Here I Am	
"Last Time"	Kelly Rowland	Ezekiel Lewis; Patrick Smith	Ms. Kelly	
"Love Is the Greatest"	Kelly Rowland	Richard Butler Jr. Salaam Remi	Here I Am	
"Make Believe"	Kelly Rowland	Kenneth C. Coby	Here I Am	
"Mr. Postman"	Kelly Rowland	Big Tank	Ms. Kelly	
"Never Mine"	Kelly Rowland	Amanda Ghost; David McCracken; Kelly Rowland	—	
"On and On"	Kelly Rowland	Robert Allen; Brian Kennedy Seals; Andre Merrit; Kelly Rowland	Here I Am	
"Save Something Real"	Kelly Rowland	Eric Michael Aguirre; Adam Argyle; Martin Brammer; James Doman; Sinéad Harnett; Henry Olortegui; Kelly Rowland	—	
"Show and Tell"	Kelly Rowland	Brian Garcia; Anderson Hernández; Allen Ritter; Kelly Rowland; Mathew Samuels	—	
"Smooches"	Kelly Rowland	Nikesha Briscoe; Candice Pillay; Justin Ellington; Shondrae Crawford	Here I Am	
"Take Everything"	Kelly Rowland featuring Pitbull	Jim Jonsin; Rico Love; Armando Perez; Daniel Morris	Here I Am	
"Tell Me"	Kelly Rowland	Kenneth Bereal; Lonny Bereal; Lyndrea Price; Kelly Rowland; Francisco Santa Cruz; Lisa Simmons	Ms. Kelly	
"Tender Love"	Kelly Rowland	Jimmy Jam; Terry Lewis	—	
"Time by Myself"	Kelly Rowland	Garrett Hamler; Kelly Rowland; Warren Felder	—	
"Watcha Do"	Kelly Rowland	Garrett Hamler; Kelly Rowland; Warren Felder	Ms. Kelly	
"What It Do"	Kelly Rowland	Patrick "J. Que" Smith	Ms. Kelly	
"Work Her Man"	Kelly Rowland	Big Tank; Les	Ms. Kelly	
