= Kelly Rowland discography =

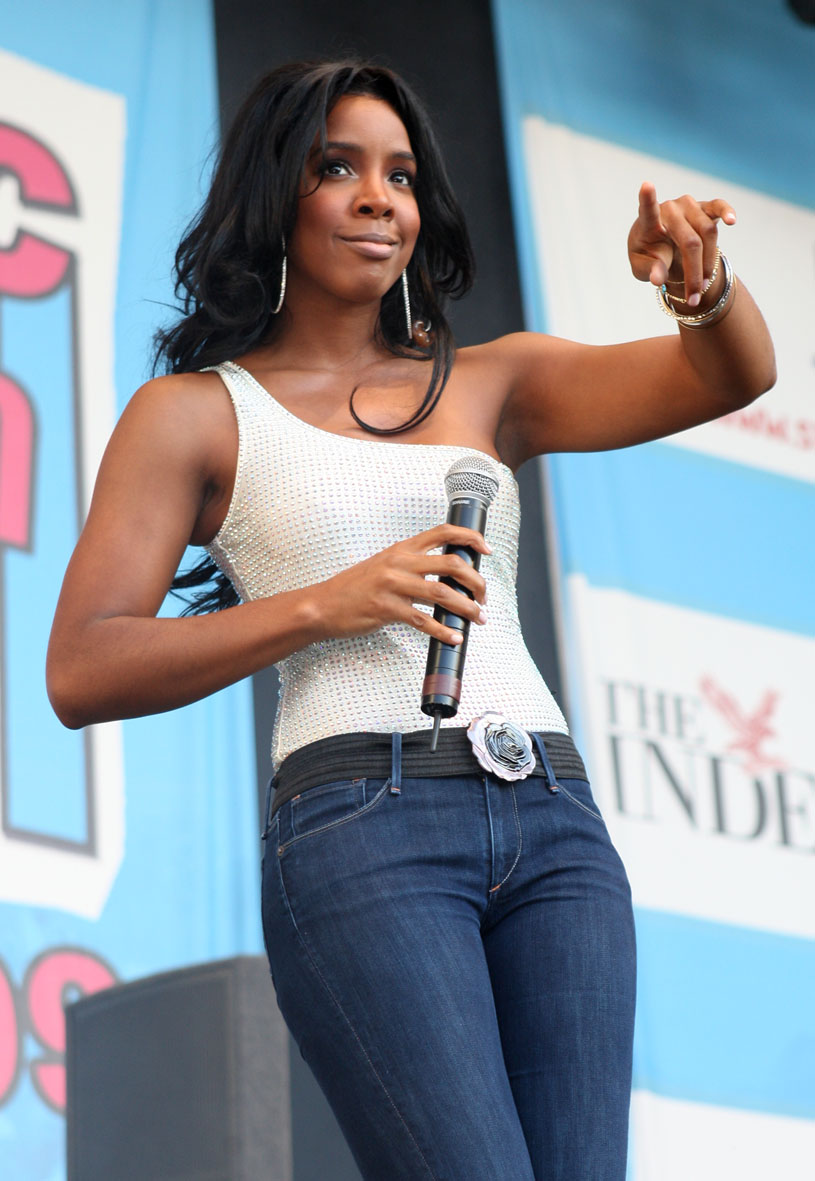
- Rowland in 2009
- Studio albums: 4
- Extended plays: 4
- Compilation albums: 3
- Video albums: 3
- Singles: 46
- Promotional singles: 8
- Music videos: 56

American singer Kelly Rowland has released four studio albums, two compilation albums and a box set, four extended plays, three video albums and DVDs, 45 official, featuring, charity and promotional singles, and 55 music videos. She began her career in 1997 with one of the best-selling girl groups, Destiny's Child, who have sold around 60 million records worldwide.

During the hiatus of Destiny's Child, Rowland released her debut solo album, Simply Deep (2002), on Columbia Records. It included her worldwide number-one single "Dilemma" with rapper Nelly, which spent ten consecutive weeks atop the US Billboard Hot 100. The album's other singles include "Stole", "Can't Nobody" and "Train on a Track". "Stole" peaked in the top 30 of the Billboard Hot 100, and the top five in most other regions, including the United Kingdom, where it reached number two. More than 2.5 million copies of the album were sold worldwide. It was subsequently certified platinum in the UK and gold in Australia, Ireland, New Zealand and the United States.

After the disbandment of Destiny's Child in 2006, Rowland was featured on Trina's top-twenty single, "Here We Go". Her second studio album, Ms. Kelly, was released in 2007 and debuted at number six on the US Billboard 200. It featured the singles "Like This", "Work", "Ghetto" and "Daylight". "Like This" peaked in the top thirty of the Billboard Hot 100 and top five in Ireland and the UK. "Work" reached the top ten in several countries including Australia, Italy, New Zealand, Switzerland and the UK. Ms. Kelly was considerably less successful than its predecessor, failing to earn any chart certificates, and Columbia subsequently ended their contract with Rowland.

Between 2009 and 2011, Rowland was featured on a number of commercially successful singles by European artists Tiziano Ferro, David Guetta, Tinie Tempah and Alex Gaudino. Her collaboration with Guetta, "When Love Takes Over", became a worldwide number-one hit. She later signed a new record deal with Universal Motown Records, and released her third studio album, Here I Am (2011). It debuted at number three on the Billboard 200 and produced the singles "Commander", "Rose Colored Glasses", "Forever and a Day", "Motivation", "Lay It on Me" and "Down for Whatever". "Commander" reached the top ten in several charts worldwide, and "Motivation" topped the US Hot R&B/Hip-Hop Songs chart for seven weeks and was certified 2× Platinum by the RIAA. Rowland's fourth studio album, Talk a Good Game, was released in 2013 through Republic Records. It debuted at number four on the Billboard 200 and included the singles "Kisses Down Low", which was certified gold in the US, and "Dirty Laundry".

== Albums ==
=== Studio albums ===
List of albums, with selected chart positions, sales figures and certifications
Title	Album details	Peak chart positions										Sales	Certifications
Title	Album details	US	US R&B/ HH	AUS	GER	IRL	ITA	NLD	NZ	SWI	UK	Sales	Certifications
Simply Deep	Released: October 22, 2002; Formats: CD, digital download; Label: Columbia	12	3	5	14	2	50	16	7	17	1	World: 2,500,000 (Note: Worldwide sales figure for Simply Deep, as of 2011.); US: 602,000 (Note: United States sales figure for Simply Deep, as of 2007.); UK: 315,000 (Note: United Kingdom sales figure for Ms. Kelly, as of 2003.)	RIAA: Gold; ARIA: Gold; BPI: Platinum; IRMA: Gold; RMNZ: Gold
Ms. Kelly	Released: June 22, 2007; Formats: CD, digital download; Label: Columbia	6	2	44	80	46	41	61	—	38	23	World: 1,200,000 (Note: Worldwide sales figure for Ms. Kelly, as of 2012.); US: 222,000 (Note: United States sales figure for Ms. Kelly, as of 2011.); UK: 24,424 (Note: United Kingdom sales figure for Ms. Kelly, as of 2008.)	
Here I Am	Released: July 22, 2011; Formats: CD, digital download; Label: Universal Motown	3	1	61	—	87	—	—	—	69	43	US: 241,692 (Note: United States sales figure for Here I Am, as of 2013)	BPI: Gold
Talk a Good Game	Released: June 14, 2013; Formats: CD, digital download; Label: Republic	4	4	— (Note: Talk a Good Game did not enter the Australian ARIA Albums chart but peaked at position 16 on the ARIA Urban Albums chart.)	—	—	—	—	—	74	80	US: 176,864 (Note: United States sales figure for Talk a Good Game, as of 2013)	
"—" denotes items which were not released in that country or failed to chart.

=== Box sets and compilations ===
List of albums, with selected details
Title	Album details
Simply Deep / Ms. Kelly: Deluxe Edition	Released: September 27, 2010; Format: Double CD; Label: Columbia, Sony Music (88697779682)
Work: The Best of Kelly Rowland	Released: October 25, 2010; Formats: CD, digital download; Label: Camden, Sony Music (88697780762)
Playlist: The Very Best of Kelly Rowland	Released: October 18, 2011; Formats: CD, digital download; Label: Sony Legacy

== Extended plays ==
List of EPs, with selected details
Title	Details	Peak chart positions
Title	Details	UK Digital
Ms. Kelly: Diva Deluxe	Released: May 25, 2008; Format: Digital download; Label: Music World, Columbia	—
Ms. Kelly Deluxe Digital EP	Released: June 27, 2008; Format: Digital download; Label: Columbia, Sony Music	—
The Kelly Rowland Edition	Released: May 18, 2019; Format: Digital download, streaming; Label: Self-released	—
K	Released: February 19, 2021; Format: Digital download, streaming; Label: KTR	81

== Singles ==
=== As a lead artist ===
List of singles, with selected chart positions and certifications, showing year released and album name
Title	Year	Peak chart positions										Certifications	Album
Title	Year	US	US R&B /HH	AUS	GER	IRL	ITA	NLD	NZ	SWI	UK	Certifications	Album
"Stole"	2002	27	54	2	15	3	12	10	3	9	2	ARIA: Platinum; BPI: Gold; RMNZ: Gold	Simply Deep
"Can't Nobody"	2003	97	72	13	66	15	—	24	38	37	5	ARIA: Gold	Simply Deep
"Train on a Track" (Note: Not released in the United States and Canada, but released elsewhere.)	2003	—	—	61	93	44	—	83	—	67	20		Simply Deep
"Like This" (featuring Eve)	2007	30	7	13	—	5	—	85	11	77	4	RIAA: Gold; BPI: Silver; RMNZ: Gold	Ms. Kelly
"Ghetto" (Note: Only released in the United States and Canada.) (featuring Snoop Dogg)	2007	—	— (Note: "Ghetto" did not enter the Hot R&B/Hip-Hop Songs, but peaked at number 9 on the Bubbling Under R&B/Hip-Hop Songs chart.)	—	—	—	—	—	—	—	—		Ms. Kelly
"Work"	2008	—	—	6	25	12	6	14	10	8	4	ARIA: Platinum; BPI: Gold; RMNZ: Gold	Ms. Kelly
"Daylight" (featuring Travis McCoy)	2008	— (Note: "Daylight" did not enter the Billboard Hot 100, but peaked at number 4 on the Dance Club Songs chart.)	—	43	—	43	—	—	—	—	14		Ms. Kelly: Diva Deluxe
"Commander" (featuring David Guetta)	2010	— (Note: "Commander" did not enter the Billboard Hot 100, but peaked at number 1 on the Dance Club Songs chart.)	—	61	16	13	—	66	16	46	9	BPI: Platinum; RMNZ: Gold	Here I Am
"Rose Colored Glasses"	2010	—	— (Note: Although "Rose Colored Glasses" did not chart on the Billboard Hot 100 or Hot R&B/Hip-Hop Songs charts, it peaked at number 39 on the Mediabase US Top 40 Airplay chart.)	—	—	—	—	—	—	—	—		Here I Am
"Grown Woman"	2010	—	51	—	—	—	—	—	—	—	—		Non-album single
"Forever and a Day"	2010	—	—	—	—	—	—	—	—	—	49		Here I Am
"Motivation" (featuring Lil Wayne)	2011	17	1	—	—	—	—	—	—	—	166	RIAA: 2× Platinum; BPI: Silver; RMNZ: Platinum	Here I Am
"Lay It on Me" (featuring Big Sean)	2011	— (Note: Although "Lay It on Me" did not chart on the Billboard Hot 100, it peaked at number nine on the US Bubbling Under Hot 100 Singles chart.)	43	—	—	—	—	—	—	—	69		Here I Am
"Down for Whatever" (featuring The WAV.s)	2011	—	—	—	31	16	—	—	—	62	6		Here I Am
"Ice" (featuring Lil Wayne)	2012	88	24	—	—	—	—	—	—	—	—		Non-album single
"Kisses Down Low"	2013	72	25	—	—	—	—	—	—	—	—	RIAA: Gold; RMNZ: Gold	Talk a Good Game
"Dirty Laundry"	2013	— (Note: Although "Dirty Laundry" did not chart on the Billboard Hot 100, it peaked at number 13 on the US Bubbling Under Hot 100 Singles chart.)	47	—	—	—	—	—	—	—	—		Talk a Good Game
"Love You More at Christmas Time"	2019	—	—	—	—	—	—	—	—	—	—		Non-album singles
"Coffee"	2020	— (Note: "Coffee" did not enter the Billboard Hot 100, but peaked at number 27 on the Digital Song Sales chart.)	—	—	—	—	—	—	— (Note: "Coffee" did not enter the NZ Top 40 Singles chart, but peaked at number 34 on the NZ Hot Singles chart.)	—	—		Non-album singles
"Crazy"	2020	—	—	—	—	—	—	—	—	—	—		K
"Hitman"	2020	—	—	—	—	—	—	—	—	—	—		K
"Black Magic"	2021	—	—	—	—	—	—	—	—	—	—		K
"—" denotes items which were not released in that country or failed to chart.

=== As a featured artist ===
List of featured singles, with selected chart positions and certifications, showing year released and album name
Title	Year	Peak chart positions										Certifications	Album
Title	Year	US	US R&B/ HH	AUS	GER	IRL	ITA	NLD	NZ	SWI	UK	Certifications	Album
"Dilemma" (Nelly featuring Kelly Rowland)	2002	1	1	1	1	1	3	1	2	1	1	ARIA: 3× Platinum; BPI: 4× Platinum; BVMI: Gold; FIMI: Gold; NVPI: Gold; RMNZ: 5× Platinum; IFPI SWI: Platinum	Nellyville and Simply Deep
"Une femme en prison" (Stomy Bugsy featuring Kelly Rowland)	2003	—	—	—	—	—	—	—	—	—	—		4ème Round
"Here We Go" (Trina featuring Kelly Rowland)	2005	17	8	—	—	—	—	—	17	—	15	RIAA: Gold	Glamorest Life
"No Future in the Past" (Nâdiya featuring Kelly Rowland)	2008	—	—	—	—	—	—	—	—	—	—		Électron Libre
"Breathe Gentle" (Tiziano Ferro featuring Kelly Rowland)	2009	—	—	—	—	—	2	7	—	—	—	FIMI: Platinum	Alla Mia Età
"When Love Takes Over" (David Guetta featuring Kelly Rowland)	2009	76	—	6	2	1	1	5	7	1	1	ARIA: 2× Platinum; BPI: 2× Platinum; BVMI: Platinum; FIMI: Platinum; RMNZ: 2× Platinum; IFPI SWI: Platinum	One Love
"Invincible" (Tinie Tempah featuring Kelly Rowland)	2010	—	—	38	39	13	33	—	5	33	11	BPI: Silver; RMNZ: Gold	Disc-Overy
"What a Feeling" (Alex Gaudino featuring Kelly Rowland)	2011	—	—	153	84	38	47	66	—	—	6		Doctor Love
"Gone" (Nelly featuring Kelly Rowland)	2011	— (Note: Although "Gone" did not chart on the Billboard Hot 100, it peaked at number 13 on the US Bubbling Under Hot 100 Singles chart.)	59	55	—	—	—	—	—	—	58		5.0
"Favor" (Lonny Bereal featuring Kelly Rowland)	2011	—	83	—	—	—	—	—	—	—	—		The Love Train
"Boo Thang" (Verse Simmonds featuring Kelly Rowland)	2011	—	44	—	—	—	—	—	—	—	—		Sextape Chronicles 2
"How Deep Is Your Love" (Sean Paul featuring Kelly Rowland)	2012	—	—	—	—	—	—	—	—	72	—		Tomahawk Technique
"Representin" (Ludacris featuring Kelly Rowland)	2012	97	28	—	—	—	—	—	—	—	—		Non-album single
"Mama Told Me" (Big Boi featuring Kelly Rowland)	2012	—	—	—	—	—	—	—	—	—	—		Vicious Lies and Dangerous Rumors
"Neva End (Remix)" (Future featuring Kelly Rowland)	2012	52	14	—	—	—	—	—	—	—	—	RIAA: Platinum	Pluto 3D
"Without Me" (Fantasia featuring Kelly Rowland and Missy Elliott)	2013	74	26	—	—	—	—	—	—	—	—		Side Effects of You
"One Life" (Madcon featuring Kelly Rowland)	2013	—	—	—	6	—	—	—	—	37	—	BVMI: Gold	Icon
"Let Me Love You" (Pusha T featuring Kelly Rowland)	2013	—	—	—	—	—	—	—	—	—	—		My Name Is My Name
"Love & Sex, Pt. 2" (Joe featuring Kelly Rowland)	2014	—	— (Note: "Love & Sex, Pt. 2" did not enter the Hot R&B/Hip-Hop Songs, but peaked at number 33 on the R&B/Hip-Hop Airplay chart.)	—	—	—	—	—	—	—	—		Bridges
"Say Yes" (Michelle Williams featuring Beyoncé and Kelly Rowland)	2014	— (Note: Although "Say Yes" did not chart on the Billboard Hot 100, it peaked at number nine on the US Bubbling Under Hot 100 Singles chart.)	—	—	—	—	—	—	—	—	—		Journey to Freedom
"I Know What You Did Last Summer" (Jacob Whitesides featuring Kelly Rowland)	2015	—	—	—	—	—	—	—	—	—	—		Non-album singles
"Get It" (Busta Rhymes featuring Missy Elliott and Kelly Rowland)	2018	—	—	—	—	—	—	—	—	—	—		Non-album singles
"Finally (Cannot Hide It)" (Amorphous featuring Kelly Rowland and CeCe Peniston)	2021	—	—	—	—	—	—	—	—	—	—		Things Take Shape
“Bloody Samaritan (Remix)" (Ayra Starr featuring Kelly Rowland)	2022	—	—	—	—	—	—	—	—	—	—		19 & Dangerous Deluxe
"—" denotes items which were not released in that country or failed to chart.

=== Charity single ===
List of charity singles, with selected chart positions, showing year released and album name
Title	Year	Peak chart positions	Notes
Title	Year	US Dance	Notes
"This Is for My Girls" (among Artists for Let Girls Learn)	2016	5	To raise funds for Peace Corps Let Girls Learn Fund.

=== Promotional singles ===
List of promotional singles, with selected details
Title	Year	Peak chart positions			Album
Title	Year	AUT	GER	US R&B Digital	Album
"Separated (Remix)" (Avant featuring Kelly Rowland)	2000	—	—	—	—N/a
"Make U Wanna Stay" (featuring Joe Budden)	2003	—	—	—	Simply Deep
"Everywhere You Go" (featuring Rhythm of Africa United)	2010	—	—	—	—N/a
"Here We Go Again" (Vicky Green featuring Kelly Rowland and Trina)	2012	—	—	—	Kontor House of House Vol 14
"Summer Dreaming 2012" (Project B featuring Kelly Rowland)	2012	52	62	—	—N/a
"Gimme Love"	2016	—	—	—	—N/a
"Kelly"	2018	—	—	14	—N/a
"Crown"	2019	—	—	—	—N/a
"—" denotes items which were not released in that country or failed to chart.

== Other charted songs ==
List of non-single songs, with selected chart positions
Title	Year	Peak chart positions						Album
Title	Year	US R&B Digital	CAN	NL Urban	NZ	KOR Int.	KOR Int. Down.	Album
"Unity"	2009	—	89	—	—	—	—	Ms. Kelly: Diva Deluxe
"Castle Made of Sand" (Pitbull featuring Kelly Rowland and Jamie Drastik)	2011	—	—	—	37	—	—	Planet Pit
"Keep It Between Us"	2011	—	—	51	—	—	—	Here I Am
"Where Have You Been" (The-Dream featuring Kelly Rowland)	2013	—	—	—	—	—	87	IV Play
"You Changed" (featuring Beyoncé and Michelle Williams)	2013	16	—	—	—	20	16	Talk a Good Game
"That High" (Pitbull featuring Kelly Rowland)	2013	—	76	—	—	—	—	Meltdown
"—" denotes items which were not released in that country or failed to chart.

== Guest appearances ==
List of non-single guest appearances, with other performing artists, showing year released and album name
Title	Year	Other artist(s)	Album	Ref
"This Is How I Feel"	2004	Earth, Wind & Fire, Big Boi, Sleepy Brown	Illumination	
"Get Me Bodied" (Remix)	2007	Beyonce, Michelle Williams	B'Day	
"It's the Way You Love Me"	2009	David Guetta	One Love	
"Choose"	2009	David Guetta, Ne-Yo	One Love	
"Castle Made of Sand"	2011	Pitbull, Jamie Drastik	Planet Pit	
"Where Have You Been"	2013	The-Dream	IV Play	
"That High"	2013	Pitbull	Meltdown	
"Girl Gang"	2019	Ciara	Beauty Marks	
"Freak Freak"	2022	Yung Bleu	Tantra	

== See also ==
- Destiny's Child discography
- Kelly Rowland videography
- List of songs recorded by Kelly Rowland
- List of artists by number of UK Singles Chart number ones
