= Kelly Rowland videography =

Kelly Rowland filmography and video discography
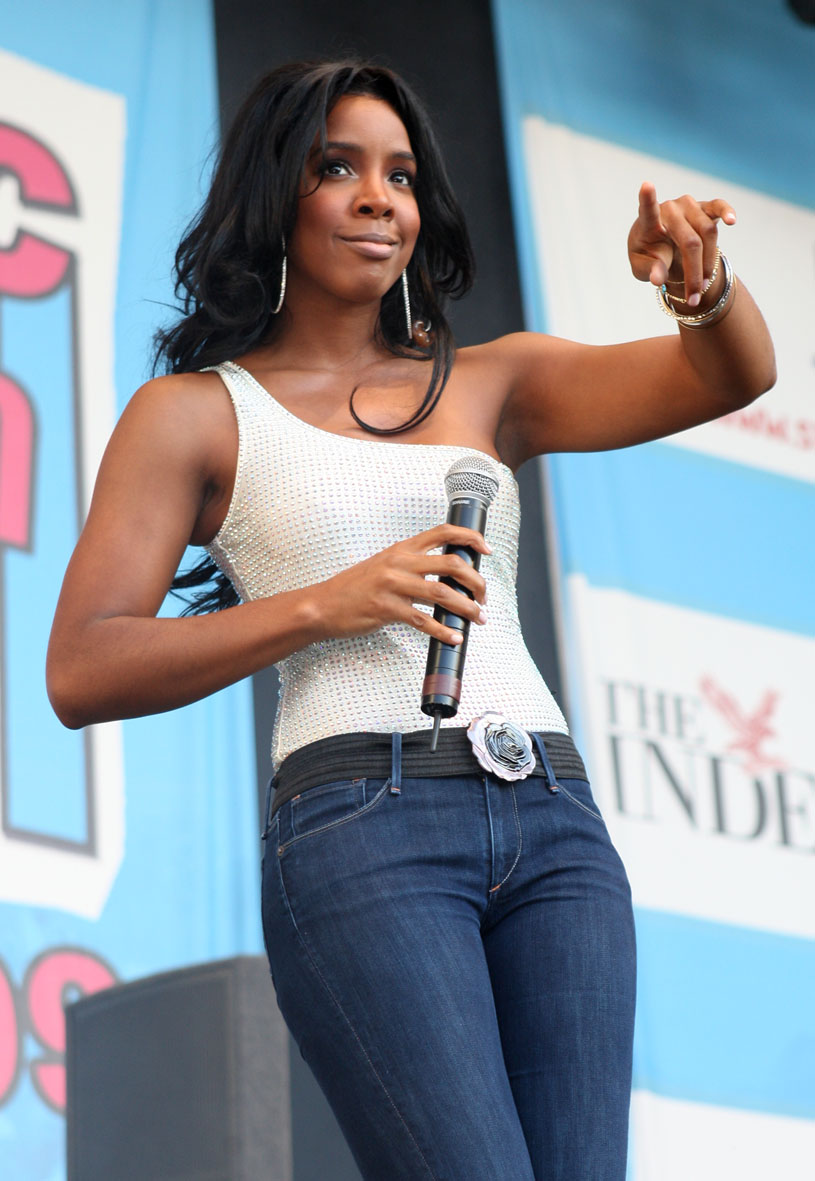
- Video albums: 3
- Music videos: 50
- Films: 6
- Telefilms: 17
- TV shows: 7
- Podcasts: 1

American R&B singer Kelly Rowland began her career in 1997 with one of the best-selling American girl groups, Destiny's Child, who have sold around 60 million records worldwide. Her solo videography includes three DVD albums, forty nine music videos, six films, seven-teen telefilms and seven television shows.

Rowland transitioned into acting with a guest role on the sitcom The Hughleys in 2002, before appearing in other UPN shows such as Eve and Girlfriends in the years 2003 and 2006. Having played the role of Tammy Hamilton, an apprentice to realtor Toni (Jill Marie Jones) in the sitcom, Rowland initially hoped her three-episode stint would expand to a larger recurring role, but as the show was moved to The CW network the following year plans for a return eventually went nowhere. Also in 2003, she appeared in American Dreams as Martha Reeves of Martha & The Vandellas, singing a version of the group's single "Nowhere to Run".

In 2003, Rowland made her big screen debut in the slasher film Freddy vs. Jason, a crossover film directed by Ronny Yu. Cast as one of the female leads, she portrayed Kia Waterson, the best friend of lead character Lori Campbell, played by Monica Keena. Released to generally mixed reviews from critics, the movie topped the U.S. box office, gaining $36.4 million on its first weekend. Budgeted at $25 million, the film became a financial success, resulting in a worldwide box office total of $114.3 million. The following year, Rowland returned to the big screen, this time for a lead role in the romantic comedy The Seat Filler, starring opposite Duane Martin and Shemar Moore. Executive produced by Will Smith and Jada Pinkett Smith, the film hit theaters in the summer of 2005 and debuted at number eighteen in the box office top twenty. It eventually earned a total domestic gross ticket sales of $10.2 million, and about $18 million worldwide. In the film, for which she recorded two songs, Rowland played a pop star who falls for an awards-show seat filler in which she mistakes for a high-profile entertainment attorney. Released to a limited number of festivals only, the film went straight to DVD in 2006.

In October 2007, Rowland auditioned for the role of Louise, Carrie Bradshaw's assistant, in the 2008 film adaptation of HBO's comedy series Sex and the City. The role eventually went to Jennifer Hudson. In fall 2007, Rowland appeared as a choirmaster on the NBC reality show Clash of the Choirs. Rowland was among superstars like Michael Bolton, Patti LaBelle, Nick Lachey, and Blake Shelton. Rowland's choir finished fifth in the competition. In 2009, she was cast to host Bravo's reality competition series The Fashion Show alongside Isaac Mizrahi. The series premiered on May 7, 2009. On May 30, 2011, Rowland was confirmed as a judge for the eighth series of British television show The X Factor. In addition to her judging stint, Rowland also had a supporting role in the motion picture Think Like a Man (2012), which also starred Keri Hilson, Chris Brown and Gabrielle Union. On April 30, 2012, it was officially announced that Rowland had stepped down as a judge on The X Factor, due to a conflicting schedule. Rowland was awarded Ultimate TV Personality at the 2011 Cosmopolitan Ultimate Women of the Year Awards, and TV Personality of the Year at the 2012 Glamour Women of the Years Awards, for her role on the show. In August 2012, Rowland became a dance master alongside Jason Derülo, for the first season of the Australian dance talent show Everybody Dance Now. However, on August 21, 2012, the show was cancelled due to poor ratings.

== DVDs ==
List of DVD releases with selected details
Title	Album details
BET Presents Kelly Rowland	Released: July 3, 2007; Label: Columbia Records (0003711703542); Format: CD, DVD; BET footage, interviews, music videos and live performances.
Sexy Abs with Kelly Rowland	Released: December 15, 2011; Format: DVD; Workout footage
Sexy Abs Cardio Sculpt with Kelly Rowland	Released: October 1, 2013; Format: DVD; Workout footage

== Music videos ==
=== 2000s ===
Title	Year	Director(s)	Artist(s)
"Separated" (Remix)	2000	J. Jesses Smith	Avant feat. Kelly Rowland
"Dilemma"	2002	Benny Boom	Nelly & Kelly Rowland
"Stole"	2002	Sanaa Hamri	Kelly Rowland
"Can't Nobody"	2003	Benny Boom	Kelly Rowland
"Train on a Track"	2003	Antti Jokinen	Kelly Rowland
"Here We Go"	2005	Nick Quested	Trina feat. Kelly Rowland
"Like This"	2007	Mike Ruiz	Kelly Rowland feat. Eve
"Ghetto"	2007	Andrew Gura	Kelly Rowland feat. Snoop Dogg
"Comeback"	2007	Philip Andelman	Kelly Rowland
"Work"	2007	Philip Andelman	Kelly Rowland
"Daylight"	2007	Jeremy Rall	Kelly Rowland feat. Travis McCoy
"No Future in the Past"	2008	Thierry Vergnes	Nâdiya & Kelly Rowland
"Breathe Gentle"	2009	Gaetano Morbioli	Tiziano Ferro feat. Kelly Rowland
"When Love Takes Over"	2009	Jonas Åkerlund	David Guetta feat. Kelly Rowland

=== 2010s ===
Title	Year	Director(s)	Artist(s)
"Everywhere You Go"	2010	Andrew Wessels	Kelly Rowland & Rhythm of Africa
"Commander"	2010	Masashi Muto	Kelly Rowland feat. David Guetta
"Rose Colored Glasses"	2010	John "Rankin" Wadell	Kelly Rowland
"Forever and a Day"	2010	Sarah Chatfield	Kelly Rowland
"Invincible"	2010	Josh Kasselman	Tinie Tempah feat. Kelly Rowland
"Gone"	2011	Marc Klasfeld	Nelly feat. Kelly Rowland
"Motivation"	2011	Sarah Chatfield	Kelly Rowland feat. Lil Wayne
"What a Feeling"	2011	Frank Gatson	Alex Gaudino feat. Kelly Rowland
"Favor"	2011	Juwan Lee	Lonny Bereal feat. Kelly Rowland
"Lay It on Me"	2011	Sarah Chatfield	Kelly Rowland feat. Big Sean
"Down for Whatever"	2011	Sarah Chatfield	Kelly Rowland feat. The WAV.s
"Boo Thang"	2011	Gil Green	Verse Simmonds feat. Kelly Rowland
"Keep It Between Us"	2012	David Dang	Kelly Rowland
"Summer Dreaming 2012"	2012	Annick Wolfers	Project B feat. Kelly Rowland
"How Deep Is Your Love"	2012	Juwan Lee	Sean Paul feat. Kelly Rowland
"Representin"	2012	Christopher Sims	Ludacris feat. Kelly Rowland
"Mama Told Me"	2012	Syndrome	Big Boi feat. Kelly Rowland
"Ice"	2012	Matthew Rolston	Kelly Rowland feat. Lil Wayne
"Neva End (Remix)"	2012	Eric White	Future feat. Kelly Rowland
"Kisses Down Low"	2013	Colin Tilley	Kelly Rowland
"Without Me"	2013	Steven Gomillion and Dennis Leupold	Fantasia feat. Kelly Rowland & Missy Elliott
"One Life"	2013	Ray Kay	Madcon feat. Kelly Rowland
"Dirty Laundry"	2013	Sarah McColgan	Kelly Rowland
"Love & Sex, Pt. 2"	2014	Bille Woodruff	Joe feat. Kelly Rowland
"The Game" (Official Video)	2014	Spike Lee	Kelly Rowland
"Say Yes"	2014	Matthew A. Cherry	Michelle Williams feat. Kelly Rowland & Beyoncé
"The Game" (Official Fan Video)	2014	Spike Lee	Kelly Rowland
"Dumb"	2016	Frank Gatson Jr.	Kelly Rowland feat. Trevor Jackson
"Crown"	2019	Hannah Lux Davis	Kelly Rowland

=== 2020s ===
Title	Year	Director(s)	Artist(s)
"Coffee"	2020	Steven Gormillion	Kelly Rowland
"Hitman"	2020	Lloyd Pursall & Luam Keflezgy	Kelly Rowland
"I Get It"	2020	Justin Simien	Kelly Rowland (credited as Sandra)
"Black Magic"	2021	Mayowa & Emanuele Pica	Kelly Rowland
"Flowers"	2021	Lloyd Pursall	Kelly Rowland

=== Guest appearances ===
Title	Year	Director(s)	Artist(s)
"Get Me Bodied"	2007	Anthony Mandler, Beyoncé	Beyoncé
"No Substitute Love"	2008	Jake McAfee	Estelle
"Baby by Me"	2009	Chris Robinson	50 Cent feat. Ne-Yo
"Party"	2011	Alan Ferguson	Beyoncé feat. J. Cole
"Heart Attack"	2012	Benny Boom	Trey Songz
"Make Love to Me"	2012	Frank Gatson	Luke James
"Superpower"	2013	Jonas Åkerlund	Beyoncé feat. Frank Ocean
"Grown Woman"	2013	Jake Nava	Beyoncé
"Brown Skin Girl"	2020	Jenn Nkiru	Beyoncé, Blue Ivy, SAINt JHN, WizKid

== Filmography ==
=== Films ===
Year	Title	Role	Notes
1999	Beverly Hood	Girl #2	Cameo appearance
2003	Freddy vs. Jason	Kia Waterson	Supporting role
2005	The Seat Filler	Jhnelle	Lead role
2011	Nothing but the Beat	Herself	Documentary
2012	God Save My Shoes	Herself	Cameo appearance
2012	Think Like a Man	Brenda	Supporting role
2017	Love by the 10th Date	Margot	Lifetime Television film
2019	Merry Liddle Christmas	Jacquie Liddle	Lifetime Television film
2019	Homecoming	Herself	Documentary
2020	Bad Hair	Sandra	Hulu film
2020	Black is King	Herself	Visual Album
2020	Merry Liddle Christmas Wedding	Jacquie Liddle	Lifetime Television film
2021	Merry Liddle Christmas Baby	Jacquie Liddle	Lifetime Television film
2022	Fantasy Football	Keisha Coleman	Paramount+ film
2022	The Curse of Bridge Hollow	Emily Gordon	Netflix film
2023	Renaissance: A Film by Beyoncé	Herself	Documentary
2024	Mea Culpa	Mea Harper	Also producer
2026	Relationship Goals	Leah Caldwell	

=== TV shows ===
Television
Year	Title	Role
2007	Clash of the Choirs	Herself; choir master
2009	The Fashion Show (US)	Herself; co-host
2010	X Factor (Germany)	Herself; Season 1 guest mentor
2010	The X Factor (Australia)	Herself; Season 2 guest mentor
2011	The X Factor (UK)	Herself; judge/mentor; Series 8
2012	Everybody Dance Now	Herself; dance master
2013	The X Factor (USA)	Herself; judge/mentor; Season 3
2016	Chasing Destiny	Herself; coach/mentor
2017	The Voice	Herself; Season 13 advisor
2017–2020	The Voice (Australia)	Herself; from seasons 6 through 9
2024	The Voice UK	Herself; coach for series 14 onwards

=== TV guest appearances ===
Television
Year	Title	Role	Notes
1998	Smart Guy	Herself; cameo with Destiny's Child	"A Date With Destiny" (season 3, episode 10)
1999	Pacific Blue	Herself; cameo with Destiny's Child	"Ghost Town" (season 5, episode 11)
2000	The Famous Jett Jackson	Herself; cameo with Destiny's Child	"Backstage Pass" (season 3, episode 16)
2002	The Hughleys	Carly	"Smells Like Free Spirit" (season 4, episode 14) "You've Got Male" (season 4, episode 18) "It's a Girl (2)" (season 4, episode 22)
2002	Taina	Nicole Burke	"Starstruck" (season 2, episode 11)
2003	American Dreams	Martha Reeves	"City on Fire" (season 1, episode 25) "Life's Illusions" (season 2, episode 30)
2003	Eve	Cleo	"Twas the Fight Before Christmas" (season 1, episode 11)
2006	Girlfriends	Tammy Hamilton	"Oh Hell Yes: The Seminar" (season 6, episode 15) "I'll Be There for You... but Not Right Now" (season 6, episode 17) "I Don't Wanna Be a Player No More" (season 6, episode 20)
2010	Brandy and Ray J: A Family Business	Herself	"Singled Out" (season 1, episode 2)
2010	The Spin Crowd	Herself	"Summer Lovin" (season 1, episode 6)
2010	When I Was 17	Herself	Season 1, episode 16
2010	La La's Full Court Wedding	Herself	Season 1, episode 3
2010	The A-List: New York	Herself	"Codeword Delicious" (season 1, episode 1)
2011	Kourtney and Kim Take New York	Herself	"Diva Las Vegas" (season 1, episode 4)
2011	Single Ladies	DJ Denise Phillips	"Can't Hide Love" (season 1, episode 9)
2011	Keeping Up with the Kardashians	Herself	"Kim's Fairytale Wedding: A Kardashian Event, Part 2" (season 6, episode 15)
2012	La La's Full Court Life	Herself	"Birthday Presence" (season 2, episode 2)
2013	Real Husbands of Hollywood	Herself	"Doing the Bump" (season 2, episode 8)
2015	Empire	Leah Walker	Season 2; recurring role
2015	Being Mary Jane	Robin	"Don't Call It a Comeback" (season 3, episode 6)
2019	American Soul	Gladys Knight	Season 1; recurring role
2019	A Black Lady Sketch Show	CIA technologist	"Angela Bassett Is the Baddest Bitch" (season 1, episode 1)
2019–2020	L.A.'s Finest	Faith Baines	"Farewell" (season 1, episode 5) "Bad Company" (season 2, episode 8)
2020	Boomerang	Herself	"Hot Sex" (season 2, episode 6)
2022	The Equalizer	Misty	"Paradise Lost" (season 3, episode 7)
2023	Grown-ish	Dr. Edith "Edie" Horne	Season 6; recurring role

=== Podcasts ===
Year	Title	Role	Notes	Ref.
2023	Breakthrough	Judge	Audio-Only	

=== Commercials ===
Year	Title	Notes
2004	Softsheen Dark & Lovely	
2005	Wal-Mart Christmas	with Destiny's Child
2015	Dreft	Kelly Rowland Gushes Over Baby Titan In New Dreft Commercial
2016	Seagram's Escapes TV Commercial	Kelly Rowland presents two new Seagram's Escapes flavors: Orange Sassy Swirl and Pink Pineapple Passion. Each brings its own style and color to the party.
2017	BAND-AID Brand Adhesive Bandages	Kelly Rowland teamed up with Band-Aid brand as part of its Stick With It campaign for its new skin-flex bandages.
