= Don't You Worry =

Don't You Worry may refer to:

- "Don't You Worry" (Madasun song), 2000
- "Don't You Worry" (Kelly Rowland song), 2019
- "Don't You Worry" (Black Eyed Peas, Shakira and David Guetta song), 2022

== See also ==
- "Don't You Worry Child" a 2012 song by Swedish House Mafia featuring John Martin
- Don't Worry 'bout a Thing (disambiguation)
