= Coffee (Kelly Rowland song) =

2020 single by Kelly Rowland

Single by Kelly Rowland
- Released: April 17, 2020
- Recorded: Summer 2017
- Length: 2:11
- Label: KTR
- Songwriters: Kelly Rowland; Marcos "Kosine" Palacios; Nick Green; Sydney Bennett
- Producer: Kosine

Kelly Rowland singles chronology
"Love You More at Christmas Time" (2019)	"Coffee" (2020)	"Crazy" (2020)

"Coffee" is a song recorded by American singer Kelly Rowland from her upcoming fifth studio album. It was released on April 17, 2020, by Rowland's own label KTR Records. "Coffee" is a sexually charged slow-jam that was written by Rowland, alongside Nick Green, Sydney Bennett and Marcos Palacios from Da Internz, the latter of whom also produced the song.

== Background ==
Rowland released and promoted fourth album Talk a Good Game throughout 2013 with Republic Records. In 2018, she self-released the song, "Kelly", featured on Busta Rhymes' song "Get It" with Missy Elliott, and performed with Beyoncé during the latter's set at Coachella 2018. The following year, Rowland released the song, "Crown", as part of an anti-bullying campaign with Dove. During this period, Rowland appeared as a mentor on The Voice Australia in 2017, and released the book Whoa, Baby!: A Guide for New Moms Who Feel Overwhelmed and Freaked Out (and Wonder What the #*$& Just Happened). She also supported Jennifer Hudson as an advisor during the thirteenth season of the American adaptation of the competition series.

Rowland then announced new music was arriving in 2020; in the days and weeks preceding the song's release, she had been hosting "Coffee with Kelly" chats everynight at 7 pm with social guests on Instagram Live. Fans were allowed to engage with the "after dark" show by using the hashtag #coffeewithkelly. Then, in the week commencing April 13, Rowland began teasing new music. Her social media accounts were updated to promote a new release called "Coffee". This was followed by links for the release on digital outlets, alongside the artwork for the song. Idolator's Mike Wass pointed out that it was not certain whether "Coffee" was the first single from Rowland's fifth album which has been in the works since at least 2017. During an Instagram live interview on April 20, 2020, Rowland announced that "Coffee" was the first single from her forthcoming album, and was being released independently.

== Music and lyrics ==
Rowland had been working on new music for a few years. During several interviews, she said she understood the pressure and demand from fans for new music. In taking her time, she wanted to set a good example for her son Titan. She said "all of my fans have been so supportive but now they're like, 'We've hit a ceiling.' I have the guts to really put out the record. I'm unapologetic with this record. It's everything that I want it to be. It feels like life. It feels like a score. For me it's been the most bold I've ever been. And I want it to be a good example for my son." "Coffee" was recorded in Summer 2017 with producer Kosine from Da Internz.

Rap-Up described the song as a "bedroom banger", while Billboard's Gil Kaufman agreed, describing the song as a midtempo sensual ballad that sets the tone from the beginning with lyrics such as "Breakfast in bed, got me moanin'/ Before you go to work/ I need you to go to work". Wass from Idolator compared the song to similar content and themes as "Motivation" (2011) and "Kisses Down Low" (2013).

== Critical reception ==
Idolator's Wass said that although "Coffee" was not as "radio-friendly" as he hoped, it "never wears out its welcome — the track runs for just over two minutes — and bounces around your head long after the final beat". OnSMASH described the song as a "bouncy bop". Will Lavin of NME wrote: "On the seductively alluring 'Coffee', Rowland sings: 'Coffee and sex in the mornin'/ Breakfast in bed, got me moanin'/ Before you go to work/ I need you to go to work/ Pardon my sincerity/ You know I'm a rarity/ My love be your therapy/ All around remedy/ Baby who instead of me?/ These bitches will never be/ Put it down like it's heavy, baby/ Honeymoon that, wedding day that'."

Editors of Billboard, Gab Ginsberg and Jason Lipshutz, described the song as a "pop-leaning morning-sex jam" accompanied by a "crackling beat" to match every innuendo.

== Music video ==
The official music video for "Coffee" arrived alongside the song's release on April 17, 2020. It was directed by Steve Gommillion. Sporting a tropical theme, the video was filmed in Miami, prior to social distancing regulations and the COVID-19 pandemic. Set on a beach, the video features scenes of Rowland "posing in a swimsuit, riding a horse and slowly rolling her hips with her crew of bikini-clad dancers." Speaking about the video's concept during an exclusive interview with Essence, Rowland said:

"I want to celebrate the women in video—every shade, every coffee color, every curve, every essence and what they gave me,. My intention I set for the video was to take the light in yourself and your sexuality [and put it in] a God perspective, in a way where you don’t have to get any approval from anybody else. Sometimes when women stand in our own sexuality, without approval from any external source, I think that there comes a different perspective, a different outlook, a different feeling, and usually we don’t even realize we’re doing it, but I think society has kind of made it that way, especially with the Black woman."

In an article detailing the release, writers for Rap-Up described the video as "sexy".

== Charts ==
Chart performance for "Coffee"
Chart (2020)	Peak position
New Zealand Hot Singles (RMNZ)	34
US Digital Song Sales (Billboard)	27
US R&B/Hip-Hop Digital Songs (Billboard)	11
US Hot R&B Songs (Billboard)	23
