= Don't Worry About a Thing =

Don't Worry About a Thing (or similar) may refer to:

- I Don't Worry About a Thing, 1962 album by Mose Allison
- "Don't You Worry 'bout a Thing", 1973 song by Stevie Wonder
- Don't You Worry 'bout a Thing (album), 1975 release by Hank Crawford
- "Feels Good (Don't Worry Bout a Thing)", 2002 song by Naughty by Nature
- "Don't Worry 'bout a Thing" (SHeDAISY song), 2005
- "Don't worry about a thing", phrase prominently featured in Bob Marley's 1977 song "Three Little Birds"

== See also ==
- Don't You Worry (disambiguation)
