= Dirty Laundry (Kelly Rowland song) =

2013 R&B song by Kelly Rowland

Single by Kelly Rowland

from the album Talk a Good Game
- Released: May 21, 2013
- Studio: Setai Recording (Miami Beach, Florida)
- Genre: R&B
- Length: 5:29 (album / single edit); 3:58 (radio edit)
- Label: Republic
- Songwriters: Kelly Rowland; Terius "The-Dream" Nash; Carlos "Los" McKinney
- Producer: The-Dream

Kelly Rowland singles chronology
"One Life" (2013)	"Dirty Laundry" (2013)	"Love & Sex, Pt. 2" (2014)

"Dirty Laundry" is a song recorded by American recording artist Kelly Rowland, for her fourth studio album, Talk a Good Game (2013). Co-written and produced by The-Dream, the R&B ballad was serviced to radio as the album's second single on May 15, 2013, and was released for digital download on May 21, 2013, through Republic Records. The record candidly documents the time in Rowland's life after the release of her debut album Simply Deep (2002); Rowland speaks of her "sister" Beyonce, with whom the relationship broke down at that moment and the domestic abuse she suffered during a previous relationship with her ex-boyfriend. Critics praised the sparse piano-led melody, as well as Rowland's openness about her "jealousy" (which Kelly actually didn't have) of Knowles and the inspiring message about leaving an abusive relationship. The official remix features a new introduction from Rowland and new verses from R. Kelly.

== Background and release ==
Following the chart success of her Lil Wayne-backed single "Motivation" (2011), Rowland started to work on her upcoming fourth studio album soon after. She said, "I'm in the studio. Man, it's been so much fun. I do wish that some of my fans could be in there for that ... [so] I have taped a lot of moments for my fans." She went on to add that the follow-up to her third album, Here I Am, will have a theme: "I made sure that I locked in on a concept and everyone that's come in to work on this album, we've all built around it. It's just building up so beautifully. I'm so proud! So I can't wait till all of my fans hear it." In the summer of 2012, Rowland reprised her collaboration with Wayne on another song called "Ice". It peaked at number 24 on the US Hot R&B/Hip-Hop Songs chart and number 88 on the Billboard Hot 100.

Rowland officially began the campaign for Talk a Good Game with the release of its lead single, the Mike Will Made It-produced "Kisses Down Low" in February 2013. "Kisses Down Low" peaked at number 25 on the US Hot R&B/Hip-Hop Songs chart and number 72 on the US Billboard Hot 100. On May 9, 2013, Rowland released a teaser for "Dirty Laundry", the minute-long clip features a scene from a laundromat set to an instrumental of the song. "Dirty Laundry" was written in collaboration with American singer-producer The Dream, who said he wanted to push Rowland outside of her comfort zone, "I want[ed] to write [her] a record so that people will know exactly who [she is], underneath it all." He told Billboard, "When you have a stage like Kelly has, you should talk about that part of your life. I think Kelly’s way deeper than that." Dream also explained how the duo came up with the song concept of the song; Rowland spoke about various experiences she had and shared her personal stories with Dream, who subsequently "put together the lyrics for the song". It premiered via Rowland's official SoundCloud page on May 15, 2013. "Dirty Laundry" was made available for digital purchase on May 21, 2013, and was serviced to US rhythmic radio stations on July 30, 2013. This was the fourth push back for Rhythmic, the previous three impact dates were: June 4, 2013, June 25, 2013, and July 16, 2013.

== Composition and lyrics ==
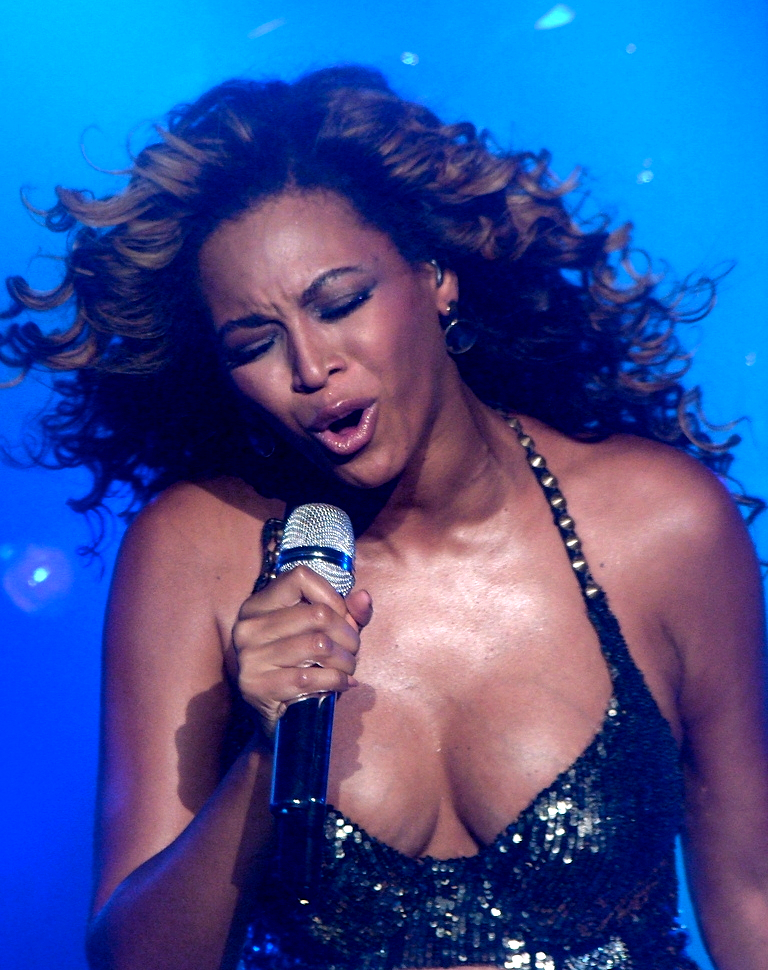
Kelly Rowland sings about her "sister" Beyonce, with whom the relationship broke down

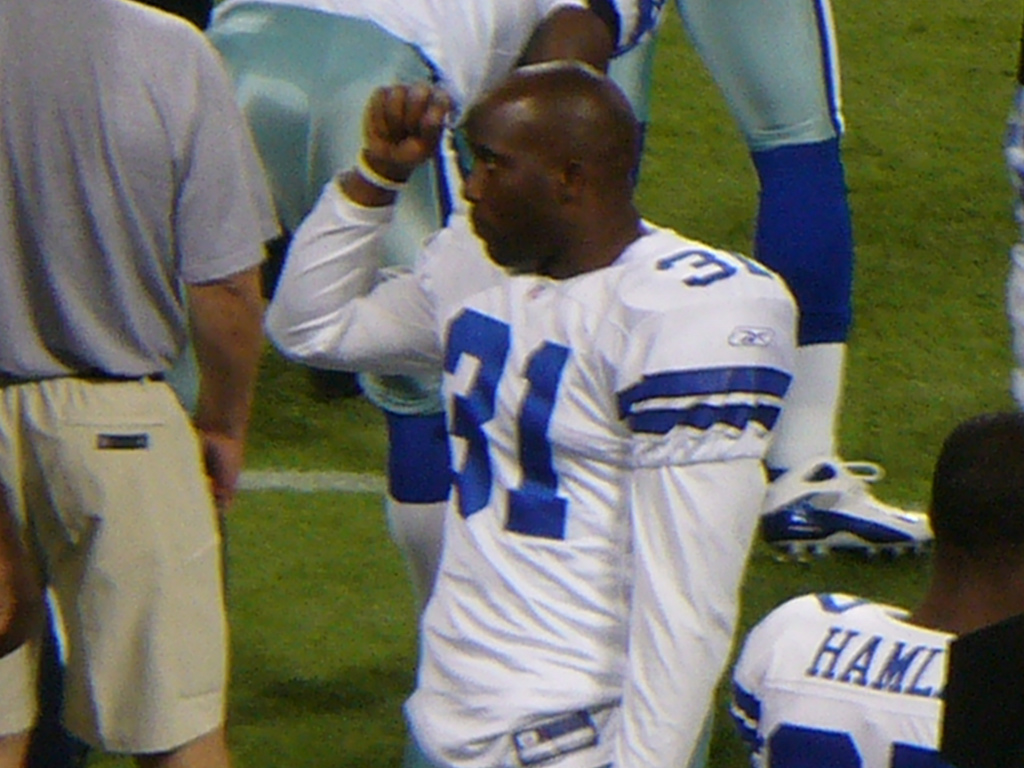
Kelly Rowland's ex fiancé, American football player Roy Williams, denies abusing Rowland.

"Dirty Laundry" is a R&B "confessional" ballad, built around "R&B jam spools" and a piano-led melody. It details a "frank and often poignant commentary" on Rowland's life, particularly focusing on her time following the release of her debut album, Simply Deep, in 2002. "Dirty Laundry" is constructed in chapters, each detailing a different part of Rowland's life. During an interview with Billboard magazine, Rowland described how emotional it was for her to record the song. According to the Billboard it took Rowland "nearly a dozen takes to lay down her vocals without crying" and that during the recent album listening sessions for Republic Records, she "had to leave the room before the song was played". According to Pitchfork's Renato Pagnani, "Rowland's voice drips with a hard-earned wisdom, the kind that only crystallizes after processing dark things and coming out the other side bearing the scars of experience". During the interview, Rowland said "It took me days to record. I had to get past being so upset and actually sing the song, not sob through it. I always hope that my music can inspire someone, the same way other artists inspire me." The chorus is built around the lines "When you’re soaked in tears it never airs out/ When you make pain look this good it never wears out."

In the first verse, Rowland talks about of former groupmate Beyoncé's well-being during the hiatus of Destiny's Child. Kelly, experiencing a mixture of isolation, psychological pressure from her partner, depression and frustration from unrealisation, she compares herself to Beyonce, who is doing well and is happy for her and feels bitterness, she herself is doing badly. The lyrics include lines such as "When my sister on stage, killing it like a motherfucker, I was in a rage, feeling it like a motherfucker. Went our separate ways but I was happy she was killin' it. Bittersweet she was up, I was down. No lie, I feel good for her but what do I do now? Post-Survivor, she on fire. Who wanna hear my bullshit". Later in the song, Rowland speaks about the abuse she suffered in a past abusive relationship. On "Dirty Laundry", Rowland sings "I was battered, he hitting the window like it was me, until it shattered. He pulled me out and said, 'Don't nobody love you but me, not your mama, not your daddy, and especially not B'". Rowland's ex fiancé Roy Williams took to social networking website Twitter to clarify rumors that he was responsible for the abuse Rowland suffered.

"So Kelly has a new song. Called #DirtyLaundry..& whatever she’s saying in it ppl think it’s me. #wow #imnottheonlypersonshedated #wasntme"

== Critical reception ==
"Dirty Laundry" was met with acclaim from contemporary music critics. Rowland's peer, fellow R&B artist Tiffany Foxx, said "It takes a lot for a woman to go deep inside and talk about things like that... We all kinda wondered with that situation if they are really good friends or is it just business or do they just have history with each other." Gerrick Kennedy from the Los Angeles Times also praised Rowland's openness, calling "Dirty Laundry" a "stunningly candid single". In his review, Kennedy also said "on 'Dirty Laundry', Rowland [shows that she is] channelling the confidence she found with her last album, 2011's Here I Am... As she’s shown on recent singles, Rowland is continuing her quest to step out of the shadows." An editor for the Huffington Post called the single "powerful". Meanwhile, Essence's Charli Penn also commented that other women should take courage from "Dirty Laundry". In her review, Penn said "We applaud Rowland’s courage, and hope the message in her music resonates with any woman who has ever experienced or been touched by a domestic violence situation." Renato Pagnani from Pitchfork Media was also complimentary of the song saying that "it achieves the tricky balance of pulling the curtain back to let the public see you at your most vulnerable and still sounding fierce and defiant." Jenna Hally Rubenstein from MTV had similar sentiments, "you know what? As hard as it must have been for Kelly to air her 'Dirty Laundry', we imagine it was equally therapeutic. We commend her courage!"

== Promotion and music video ==
Rowland performed in support of Talk a Good Game at the RiverFest 2013, on May 25, 2013, in Little Rock, Arkansas. Here, Rowland performed "Dirty Laundry" live for the first time. Rowland reprised the performance by including "Dirty Laundry" on the set list for her Lights Out tour, a co-headline tour with The Dream. The opening date on May 26, 2013, received coverage for Rowland's emotional breakdown during the performance.

A music video for "Dirty Laundry" was filmed in May 2013 with director Sarah McColgan. On June 21, 2013, a month after "Dirty Laundry" was released for digital download, Rowland premiered a 30-second snippet of its music video; in the video, Rowland dines with her abusive boyfriend before singing in a chair and sitting in a pool of water while confessing the lyrics of the song. Halfway in the video, the boyfriend leaves the table and spills a glass of wine on Rowland's dress with the guests feeling shocked. The full video premiered on Rowland's official YouTube channel on July 22, 2013.

== R. Kelly remix ==
On June 15, 2013, Power 105 FM unveiled the radio remix of "Dirty Laundry", which features American singer-songwriter and producer, R. Kelly. Rowland begins the remix with a new verse, containing the lyrics "Haven’t eaten for days, haven’t slept in weeks", then Kelly assumes his verse as the "beau" mentioned in the song with the lyric "Let’s just get it all out, you got something to say? / Say it to my face, so silence your mouth." Using Auto-Tune, Kelly also speaks about the purpose of the remix, singing "This is off the record/ This ain't for no radio/ This ain't for no sales, no / I'm just trying to let a motherfucker know." Kelly, who previously remixed Rowland's "Motivation", then takes the song's direction on to speak of those in industry who have copied his style, "See the truth of the matter is everybody can’t do this/ And that’s why I got these shit talkin’ R&B singers on my hit list". Idolator's Christina Lee wrote, "R. Kelly’s vocals actually lighten up the mood, if only because he shifts his focus to fellow artists-turned-imitators".

== Track listing ==
Digital download

1. "Dirty Laundry" – 5:29

Clean radio edit

1. "Dirty Laundry" – 3:58

== Credits and personnel ==
Recording

- Recorded at Setai Recording Studios in Miami Beach, Florida.
- Mixed at Larrabee Sound Studios in North Hollywood, California.
- Mastered at Sterling Sound, New York City, New York.

Personnel

- Lee Blake – additional keyboards
- Tom Coyne – mastering engineer
- Trey Harris – assistant mixing engineer
- Jaysen Joshua – mixing engineer
- Carlos McKinney – songwriter
- Aya Merrill – mastering engineer
- Terius "The-Dream" Nash – songwriter, producer
- Scott Naughton – recording engineer
- Jesus Rodriguez – assistant recording engineer
- Kelly Rowland – lead vocals, songwriter
- Bart Schoudel – recording engineer

== Chart performance ==
"Dirty Laundry" debuted on the US Billboard Hot R&B/Hip-Hop Songs chart at number 50, meanwhile in Canada, the song premiered on the Urban Airplay chart at number 31 in the first week of being serviced to radio.

Chart (2013)	Peak position
Canada Urban Airplay (Nielsen BDS)	15
US Bubbling Under Hot 100 (Billboard)	13
US Hot R&B/Hip-Hop Songs (Billboard)	47

== Release history ==
Release dates and formats for "Dirty Laundry"
Region	Date	Format(s)	Label(s)	Ref.
United States	May 15, 2013	Urban contemporary radio	Republic	
United States	May 21, 2013	Digital download	Republic	
France	May 29, 2013	Digital download	Def Jam	
Germany	May 29, 2013	Digital download	Universal Music	
Italy	May 29, 2013	Digital download	Universal Music	
Spain	May 29, 2013	Digital download	Universal Music	
United Kingdom	May 29, 2013	Digital download	Universal Island	
United States	July 30, 2013	Rhythmic contemporary radio	Republic	
