= Talk a Good Game =

Studio album by Kelly Rowland
- Released: June 14, 2013
- Recorded: 2011-2013
- Studios: Circle House (Miami); The Hit Factory (Miami); Setai Studios (Miami); South Beach Studios (Miami); Jungle City Studios (New York City); Eardrums Studios (Dallas); Glenwood Place Studios (Burbank)
- Genres: Pop; R&B
- Length: 49:17
- Label: Republic
- Producers: David Anderson; Jon-David Anderson; Lonny Bereal; Ben Billions; Boi-1da; Matthew Burnett; Kevin Cossom; LaShawn Daniels; Danja; The-Dream; Rico Love; Marz; Jeremy "Arthur" McArthur; Mike Will Made It; The Runners; Harmony "H-Honey" Samuels; Syk Sense; T-Minus; Pharrell Williams

Kelly Rowland chronology
| Here I Am (2011) | Talk a Good Game (2013) | The Kelly Rowland Edition (2019) |

Singles from Talk a Good Game
- 1. "Kisses Down Low" Released: February 1, 2013; 2. "Dirty Laundry" Released: May 15, 2013

Talk a Good Game is the fourth studio album by the American singer Kelly Rowland. Formerly titled Year of the Woman, the album was released on June 18, 2013, by Universal Republic and its affiliated record labels. Incorporating a base core of pop and R&B music genres, Talk a Good Game was influenced by Whitney Houston, Marvin Gaye and Stevie Wonder among Rowland's other idols. She wanted the album to be a celebration of womanhood, and referred to the record as her most personal album to date. She co-wrote all but one song, "Freak", a cover version of the 2010 song by the entertainer Jamie Foxx from his album Best Night of My Life. A deluxe edition, and a Target-exclusive edition of the album with bonus tracks, were released simultaneously with the twelve-track standard edition.

Talk a Good Game was promoted with live versions of the album's songs during the Lights Out Tour, a co-headlining concert tour between Rowland and The-Dream. The album was also preceded by the release of the lead single, a Mike Will Made It and Marz production called "Kisses Down Low", which peaked in the Top 40 of the US Billboard Hot R&B/Hip-Hop Songs chart. A second single, The-Dream-produced "Dirty Laundry", was released a month before the album.

Music critics commended the album's cohesive sound and themes, noting Rowland's personal and vulnerable lyrics as well as the strength of her vocals. Talk a Good Game entered the US Billboard 200 at number 4, selling 68,000 copies in its opening week, and was Rowland's third Top 10 album. The album also entered the US R&B/Hip-Hop Albums Chart at number 4. In 2014, Rowland left her label, wanting a new start elsewhere and signalling the end of the Talk a Good Game era. The album was her only release under Republic Records.

== Background ==
Work on Rowland's fourth studio album reportedly began in 2011, after the release of her album, Here I Am. In March 2012, Lonny Bereal told Kempire Radio that for the album Rowland would be returning to her R&B roots. "She's going in so hard with the R&B. Of course, she is going to give the Pop crowd what they're looking for. But, she really is returning to R&B on this album. Her delivery is real confident now. It's definitely a new Kelly Rowland. She wouldn't even let me put autotune on her voice this time round. She was like 'No, I want people to really get me'." The following month, Rowland told MTV News that the album would have a theme and that she had been documenting the recording process of the album for her fans to see. During an interview with Vegas magazine in June 2012, she described the album as a dedication to "my ladies". She explained, "I want to tell women how incredible we are, how our intuition is so spot-on. Sometimes we don't listen to it, but it is the thing that can actually make us happier." She cited Whitney Houston, Marvin Gaye and Stevie Wonder as the album's inspirations.

Kevin Cossom appears on the title track as well as having songwriting and vocal production credits elsewhere on the album

In August 2011, the producer Rico Love told Rap-Up magazine, "While she's on tour, I'm gonna be writing records for her new album. We can kinda roll that out and drop her new single in late spring. Excited about that." H also said that he wanted to continue developing an R&B sound with Rowland, following the US chart success of her single "Motivation" (2011), which he co-wrote and co-produced. "I believe in R&B and I believe that if we make new age records and don't make dated records and keep it classic, I think we'll be fine." Rowland also worked with Amber "Se7en" Streeter, Da Internz, Eric Bellinger, Eric Hudson, Kevin Cossom, Lonny Bereal, Nikeshia Briscoe, Redd Stylez, Rock City, T-Minus, Rodney "Darkchild" Jerkins, The Runners and Beau Vallis. On March 23, 2012, Rowland confirmed via Twitter that she was working with rapper T-Pain. Sean Garrett revealed in an interview with Rap-Up on May 9, 2012, that he also contributed to the album. He stated, "Her swag is dope and I'm just so happy to see her get her shot. I'ma do what I can to make sure Kelly right." In August 2012, the Grammy-winning songwriter Diane Warren mentioned her involvement, saying that she had been working with Rowland "because Beyoncé was telling her to get together with me".

In November 2012, Rowland revealed she had been working with production duo Jimmy Jam and Terry Lewis. Speaking of their collaboration to Billboard's Keith Caulfield, she said "Let me tell you something, they are a part of the foundation of who I am ... Because their sound was one of the first things I remember about R&B. Being in the studio with them, I wanted to pinch myself." However, it was later revealed that the songs she recorded with Jam and Lewis did not make the album. In February 2013, Rowland revealed that she had over fifty songs recorded for the album that she was continuously working on to put together the final collection. Rowland also worked with The-Dream, Pharrell Williams and Boi-1da. According to USA Today in April 2013, the rapper Pusha T was to make an appearance on the album. In April 2013, Rowland revealed she had more than 70 songs to choose from, among a feature vocal from Lil Wayne, the album features Wiz Khalifa and a duet with Pharrell Williams. Rowland reunited with her former Destiny's Child bandmates Beyoncé and Michelle Williams for a song on the album, Rowland stressed that it was not a Destiny's Child reunion but rather a song by herself featuring Beyoncé and Williams.

== Musical style, writing and composition ==
Talk a Good Game was inspired by R&B artists New Edition, Pebbles, and Babyface, Rowland spoke on the album's musical direction saying "[It] feels like everything I wanted to make as far as music and R&B, I wanted to make sure my roots were really pronounced on this album." Rowland cited Whitney Houston, Marvin Gaye and Stevie Wonder as the album's inspirations.

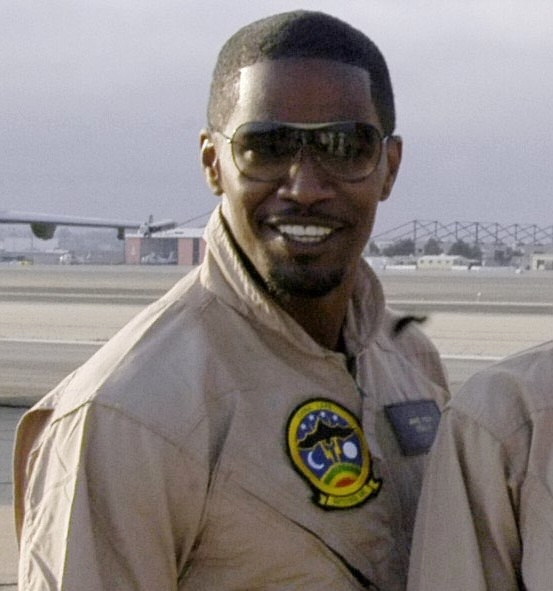
"Freak" was first recorded by American entertainer Jamie Foxx, on his album Best Night of My Life (2010).

The album opens with "Freak", an electro-R&B song that was originally recorded by American entertainer Jamie Foxx for his album Best Night of My Life (2010) It references Michael Jackson's "Thriller" as well as including a spoken bridge towards the end. Then comes "Kisses Down Low", an R&B and electronic track written by Marquel Middlebrooks, Timothy and Theron Thomas, Rowland, Mike Will Made It, with the latter producing the song. Rap-Up described the song as a "bedroom banger", whilst Billboard's Andrew Hampp described the song as an "unofficial" sequel to Rowland's most successful and sexually explicit single, 2010's "Motivation" (featuring Lil Wayne). Third in the album, is the adult contemporary-influenced "Gone", which features the hip-hop rapper Wiz Khalifa. Harmony Samuels produced the "base-heavy" and radio friendly "snapping" beat which features a prominent sample of "Big Yellow Taxi", a 1970 single by Canadian singer-songwriter Joni Mitchell. It lyrically speaks about a "man who played with her heart" and how "she's done putting up with his games". Lyrics from Rowland include "There's a million ways that I could tell you / But I think I would rather show you that it's over / And I won't be back no more", whilst Khalifa raps "I been here before / And you know Kelly never lied / So you can get your stuff / And get to going / I'll get back to getting high".

The album is named after track four, "Talk a Good Game" which features Kevin Cossom. Over a "snaky but sweet" production from T-Minus Rowland sings "I don't think I can take another broken promise / Why do things the hard way when you can just be honest". Hampp stated that Cossom's rap gave the song a "street edge". It takes the listener on an emotional journey according to The Honesty Hour. The next song, "Down on Love", is a mid-tempo production featuring another classic sample, this time the 1987 song "Rock Steady" by R&B group The Whispers. Using her mezzo-soprano vocals, Rowland takes on a downtrodden romantic situation, "We want two different things at two different times / You know how the story go / Easy come easy go". "Dirty Laundry" was co-written by Rowland, Carlos McKinney and The Dream, and is an R&B "confessional" ballad, containing "R&B jam spools" and a piano-led melody. It details a "frank and often poignant commentary" on Rowland's life. The song is a "brutal" chronicle of the last ten years of Rowland's life, covering her envy of Beyoncé's solo success and the end of an abusive relationship. Amongst the lyrics, Rowland sings "Kinda lucky I was in her shadow / Phone call from my sister what's the matter / She said, 'Oh no / You gotta leave' / I'm on the kitchen floor / He took the keys."

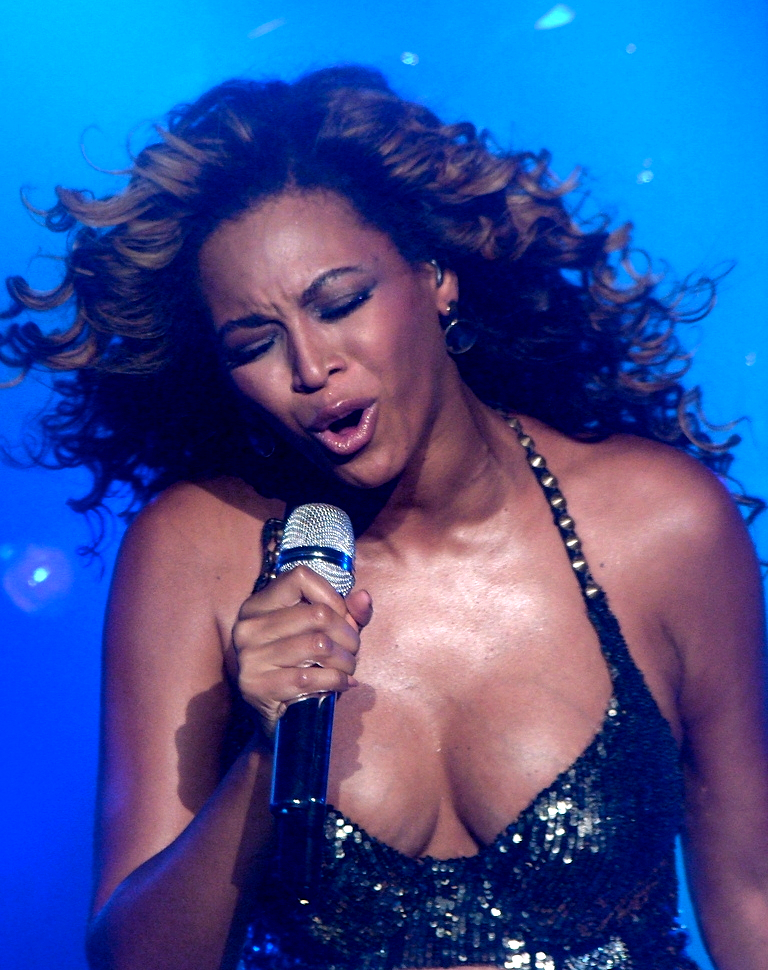
Beyoncé is envied by Rowland on "Dirty Laundry", before joining Rowland and Michelle Williams on "You Changed".

This moves onto another track called "You Changed" that features her former Destiny's Child bandmates Beyoncé and Michelle Williams. Lyrically the song talks about a relationship that has gone "awry". Rowland takes prominence on the track, though Beyoncé and Williams each get their "own cathartic verse to go off on a clueless ex". The Honesty Hour compared "You Changed" to the 2004 Destiny's Child single "Girl". Production on the album then moves on to a light mid-tempo dance track on "I Remember", which was produced by The Runners. Atop a "tinkling piano and propulsive dance beat", Rowland's "characteristically soulful vocals" can be heard. Hampp said that the song incorporated tribal music and a vibe that "consciously stops short of being a full-on four-on-the-floor banger." According to the Honesty Hour, "I Remember" remains firmly a ballad, but incorporates elements of techno and EDM. Rowland dabbles in some 80's funk pop on the Boi-1da and Matthew Burnett-produced "Red Wine". The song features dreamy synths and a soaring chorus, in a vintage throwback. It was compared to songs by Brandy Norwood. The pace continues on the romantic "This is Love" which focuses on a guy that "got [Rowland] goin' on cloud 9". Over the light production, Rowland sings "I'm waiting and anticipating for you to give it to me / Boy I'm trying to hold it inside / Heart racing, my body shaking / 'Cause when you give it to me, boy you are the truth, I can't lie." According to the Honesty Hour, "This is Love" had crossover appear for both R&B and pop radio.

"Street Life" sees Rowland opt for a "no BS" attitude. She sings about how "chasing fast money takes precedence over self-improvement" atop a mid-2000s pop music production, built around layers of hand drums and horn stabs. It was produced by Pharrell Williams and opens with Rowland saying "Ooh 'dere go my baby daddy!". The lyrics then continue on to speak about the current problems society is facing, "the recession ate me alive / Tryin' to get where the breeze is nice / So I can breathe." She then goes on to speak about social issues and the breakdown of society on lyrics like "coming from the street life we know it's letting go / We like to go to school for education / But the street life we know don't write no notes / It's like parole with the time we're facing." Pusha T appears in the song's middle 8 where he raps about honor and US president Barack Obama, "this is for my niggas with them four baby mamas...this Presidential Rollie don't make me Obama / so don't judge me by my jewelry, please your honor". The Huffington Post described "Street Life" as a departure from Rowland's previous "softer sound". The standard edition of the album finishes with "Stand in Front of Me", a 1950s' doo-wop inspired "ode to love". The simple production and lyrics include the lines "You just do it / Mean it / Prove it"; Hampp of Billboard wrote that one could expect to hear the song at weddings.

== Release and promotion ==
On October 10, 2012, Rowland announced on her official website that the album would be called Year of the Woman, and wrote that it "is one of my greatest pieces of work and I cannot wait to share it with you guys!". During an interview with Billboard magazine in November 2012, Rowland spoke about the type of songs she had been recording for the album, saying "With the things that I'm talking about, I think that it's probably the most vulnerable I've been on a record. And I wanted to just touch a woman's hand, talk to her, you know what I mean? Like, this is my sister and I think that's one of the things that I wanted to really pronounce on this album, is a celebration of a woman." During a back stage interview at the 55th Annual Grammy Awards, Rowland revealed that working with so many producers inspired her to rename the album Talk a Good Game. The album was originally due for release from June 3, 2013, but, during an interview with The Madd Hatta Morning Show on 97.9 Box FM, Rowland revealed that the album had been pushed back to June 18, 2013. The album was made available to pre-order on May 21, 2013, ahead of its June 18, 2013 US release. In August 2013, vocal producer Lonny Bereal said that Rowland was working on new music, including songs produced by Bereal, for a re-release of Talk a Good Game. In March 2014, Rowland confirmed that she had left Republic Records in search of a "fresh start" and that she had already begun work on her next studio album, signalling the end of the Talk a Good Game era.

In June 2012, it was announced that the Sean Garrett-penned song "Ice", which features rapper Lil Wayne, would serve as the album's first single. "Ice" is the third collaboration between Rowland and Wayne, following the Destiny's Child collaboration "Soldier" (2004), and her solo single "Motivation". It was sent to urban radio in the United States on August 14, 2012, and was released via iTunes Stores from August 24, 2012. "Ice" reached number 24 on the US Hot R&B/Hip-Hop Songs chart, number 88 on the US Billboard Hot 100 chart, and number 25 on the South Korea Gaon International Chart. Upon unveiling the track listing it was revealed that "Ice" would not feature on the album. Rowland performed in support of Talk a Good Game at the RiverFest 2013, on May 25, 2013, in Little Rock, Arkansas. Here, Rowland performed "Dirty Laundry" live for the first time. Rowland performed "Dirty Laundry" live for the second time on May 26, 2013, during the opening date of her co-headline tour with The-Dream, the Lights Out Tour. On May 28, 2013, Rowland visited The Raheem DaVaughn Show on BLIS.fm, where she premiered "You Changed", her collaboration with Beyoncé and Michelle Williams, as well as "Gone" featuring Wiz Khalifa and "Talk a Good Game" featuring Kevin Cossom.

On April 30, 2013, it was confirmed that Rowland would be co-headlining a US concert tour with The-Dream, who produced two songs on Talk a Good Game. Speaking about the tour, Rowland said: "To be able to work with [The-Dream] in this capacity and have the opportunity to showcase our new music to our fans live and in person is going to be extremely rewarding! I can't wait.". The Lights Out Tour was originally scheduled to have twenty-two shows, but this was later changed to five, after Rowland was forced to cancel many of the shows because she signed on to become a judge on The X Factor US. The tour kicked off on May 26, 2013, in Washington, D.C. and ended on June 2, 2013, in Mashantucket.

== Singles ==
The album's first single, "Kisses Down Low", made its worldwide premiere on January 18, 2013, and was released via iTunes Stores on February 1, 2013. The single impacted US urban radio on February 5, 2013, and US rhythmic radio on March 26, 2013. In the United States "Kisses Down Low" debuted at number 96 on the Billboard Hot 100 for the issue dated March 10, 2013. On its third week the song peaked at number 72.

On May 9, 2013, Rowland released a teaser for the album's The-Dream-penned second single "Dirty Laundry". The minute-long clip featured a scene from a laundromat. The song premiered on May 15, 2013 and was released for digital download on May 21, 2013. The track begins during a "rough period" of time after the release of her debut album Simply Deep (2002). In the lyrics, Rowland confronts a mixture of emotions that she experienced over former bandmate Beyoncé's post-Destiny's Child success; emotions including resentment and job. The second half of the song discusses an abusive past relationship. It was officially sent to US urban radio on May 15, 2013, and to US rhythmic radio on July 30, 2013. On August 7, 2013, Rowland announced that "Gone" featuring Wiz Khalifa would be released as the album's third single. However, in March 2014, it was confirmed that Rowland had left Republic Records for a new start and already started work on her fifth album, signalling the end of the Talk a Good Game era.

== Critical reception ==
Professional ratings
Aggregate scores
| Source | Rating |
|---|---|
| AnyDecentMusic? | 5.7/10 |
| Metacritic | 65/100 |
Review scores
| Source | Rating |
| AllMusic | 3.5/5 stars |
| Entertainment Weekly | B+ |
| Fact | 3.5/5 discs |
| The Guardian | 3/5 stars |
| Paste | 7.6/10 |
| PopMatters | 5/10 |
| RedEye | 3/5 stars |
| Slant Magazine | 3/5 stars |
| Spin | 8/10 |
| USA Today | 2.5/4 stars |

Upon release, Talk a Good Game received mostly positive reviews. According to Metacritic, where they assign a weighted average score out of 100 to ratings and reviews from selected mainstream critics, the album received an average of 65, based on 12 reviews. Kyle Kramer from the Chicago's RedEye entertainment newspaper called Talk a Good Game a "fantastically bold re-introduction for those who haven't checked in on Rowland in a decade." He noted that although at times Rowland experiments with adult contemporary music (on "Gone" featuring Wiz Khalifa) the majority of albums sits "between post-Drake R&B and "high energy highlights". Kramer concluded by calling Talk a Good Game a risk-taking project, which "as a result, [is] the right [move]". For VH1, Felicia Dennis and Samantha Friedman wrote that, on hearing the album, every song could have been a single. For AllMusic, Andy Kellman wrote that Talk a Good Game was a similar make-up of pop and R&B music to Rowland's releases. He described the album as full of "satisfying, if mostly unexciting, material", comparing it to Here I Am (2011) except for the lack of dance-pop songs on the new album.

Jim Farber from The New York Daily News thought that the "90s-style R&B might keep [Rowland] from receiving the mainstream appeal of her peers". Apart from "Dirty Laundry", which Farber called "a tad desperate" as the message gets lost in the melody, he thought the album "has a focused sound, based on the slow grind. As on many of Rowland's most effective songs of the past, her latest keep the center of gravity low. The songs let her slippery voice slide over loping, bass-driven beats." The Boston Globe's Sarah Rodman agreed that when people looked beyond "Dirty Laundry", the album "reflects a better balance of sound and sentiment". Writing for Slant Magazine, Annie Galvin awarded the album three out of five stars. Commenting that "Rowland is still grappling with how to create an authentic artistic identity", Galvin concluded that "Talk a Good Game's standout tracks prove that she's closer to carving a niche for herself than she has been on prior efforts that suppressed rather than addressed that difficulty".

Spin's Julianne Shepherd wrote that Talk a Good Game was "a slice above Here I Am". In the review, she wrote, "Rowland is good at anything, it's being bona fide through and through. She's an extremely likable figure in pop music, more relatable than her goddess-sis Beyoncé, more down-to-earth lyrically than many of her R&B peers. Talk a Good Game is her realness in full flower, an album that balances world-weariness about relationships with infectious dollops of sexual agency, tackling the vagaries of love almost exclusively and offering anthems for experiences that every woman has had (or will have) at some point." Andrew Hampp from Billboard agreed in his track-by-track review. He wrote, "Kelly Rowland finally comes into her own on 'Talk a Good Game' her most focused, consistent and honest album to date. Picking up where 2011's 'Here I Am' left off, the singer's new album has an additional layer of honesty and openness courtesy ... the album is still a refreshing hyper-focus on contemporary R&B." Vibe's Kathy Iandoli also agreed, saying that "Talk a Good Game sets her far apart from the status quo of mass-produced R&B... Kelly finally knows who she is and how she'd like to sound." "Rowland finally hits her stride," is what Robert Copsey wrote in his review for Digital Spy, where he also called the album "a collection of classy and sophisticated R&B".

=== Accolades ===
Accolades for Talk a Good Game
| Year | Ceremony | Award | Results |
|---|---|---|---|
| 2014 | World Music Awards | World's Best Album | Nominated |

== Commercial performance ==
On June 23, 2013, Talk a Good Game opened on the UK R&B Albums Chart at number seven, besting previous album Here I Am (2011) by one chart position. However, on the UK Albums Chart, Talk a Good Game failed to match Here I Am's peak position of forty-three, only managing to debut at number eighty. As a result, it became Rowland's lowest charting album in the UK to date. In the US, Talk a Good Game debuted on the Billboard 200 chart at number four, having sold 68,000 copies; it became Rowland's third top-ten album, though sold 9,000 copies fewer than Here I Am. Talk a Good Game also debuted at number four on the Top R&B/Hip-Hop Albums, failing to match Here I Am's peak of number one. In its second week, the album dropped to number 11. As of December 2013, Talk a Good Game has sold 215,000 copies worldwide.

== Track listing ==
Talk a Good Game – Standard edition
| No. | Title | Writer(s) | Producer(s) | Length |
|---|---|---|---|---|
| 1. | "Freak" | Floyd Nathaniel Hills; Rico Love; Marcella Araica | Danja; Love | 4:34 |
| 2. | "Kisses Down Low" | Kelly Rowland; Michael Williams II; Marquel Middlebrooks; Timothy Thomas; Theron Thomas | Mike Will Made It; Marz^{[a]} | 4:14 |
| 3. | "Gone" (featuring Wiz Khalifa) | Rowland; Harmony Samuels; Courtney Harrell; Amber Streeter; Cameron Jibril Thomaz; Joni Mitchell | H. Samuels; Lonny Bereal^{[b]} | 4:18 |
| 4. | "Talk a Good Game" (featuring Kevin Cossom) | Rowland; Kevin Cossom; Tyler Williams | T-Minus; Cossom^{[b]} | 3:23 |
| 5. | "Down on Love" | Rowland; Cossom; Andrew Harr; Jermaine Jackson; Jon-David Anderson; David Anderson | The Runners; Anderson; Anderson; Cossom^{[b]} | 4:10 |
| 6. | "Dirty Laundry" | Rowland; Terius Nash; Carlos McKinney | Nash | 5:29 |
| 7. | "You Changed" (featuring Beyoncé and Michelle) | Rowland; H. Samuels; Harrell | H. Samuels | 3:56 |
| 8. | "I Remember" | Rowland; Cossom; Harr; Jackson; Ben Diehl | The Runners; Ben Billions; Anderson^{[c]}; Anderson^{[c]}; Cossom^{[b]} | 3:41 |
| 9. | "Red Wine" | Rowland; Cossom; Matthew Samuels; Matthew Burnett | Boi-1da; Burnett^{[a]}; Cossom^{[b]} | 4:19 |
| 10. | "This Is Love" | Rowland; Jeremy McArthur; Myariah Summers; Thabiso Nkhereanye | McArthur | 3:37 |
| 11. | "Street Life" (featuring Pusha T) | Rowland; Pharrell Williams; Terrence Thorton | P. Williams | 3:44 |
| 12. | "Stand in Front of Me" | Rowland; P. Williams | P. Williams | 3:52 |
| Total length: | | | | 49:17 |

Talk a Good Game – Deluxe edition
| No. | Title | Writer(s) | Producer(s) | Length |
|---|---|---|---|---|
| 13. | "Sky Walker" (featuring The-Dream) | Rowland; Nash; McKinney; Jamal Rashid | Nash | 3:28 |
| 14. | "Put Your Name on It" | Rowland; H. Samuels; Harrell; Streeter | H. Samuels; Bereal^{[b]} | 4:43 |
| 15. | "#1" | Rowland; M. Williams; Middlebrooks | Mike Will Made It; Marz^{[a]}; LaShawn Daniels^{[b]} | 4:31 |
| Total length: | | | | 61:59 |

Talk a Good Game – Target exclusive edition
| No. | Title | Writer(s) | Producer(s) | Length |
|---|---|---|---|---|
| 16. | "Feet to the Fire" (featuring Pharrell Williams) | Rowland; P. Williams | P. Williams | 4:02 |
| 17. | "Love Me Til I Die" | Rowland; M. Samuels; Joshua Scruggs; Rupert Thomas; Nikhil Seetharam; Cossom; Beau Vallis | Boi-1da; Syk Sense^{[a]} | 4:19 |
| Total length: | | | | 70:20 |

In Australia and Canada only the 15 track deluxe edition was released on CD.

Notes and sample credits

- ^[a] signifies a co-producer.
- ^[b] signifies a vocal producer.
- ^[c] signifies an additional producer.
- "Gone" contains an interpolation "Big Yellow Taxi" (1970), as written and performed by Joni Mitchell.
- "Down on Love" samples a portion of "Rock Steady" (1987) by The Whispers.

== Personnel ==
Adapted from AllMusic and album liner.

Recording locations

- Jungle City Studios (New York City, New York)
- The Hit Factory (Miami, Florida)
- Circle House Studios (Miami, Florida)
- Eardrums Studios (Dallas, Texas)
- Glenwood Place Studios (Burbank, California)
- South Beach Studios (Miami Beach, Florida)
- Setai Recording Studios (Miami, Florida)

Vocals

- Kelly Rowland – lead vocals
- Kevin Cossom – featured artist, background vocals
- Rock City background vocals
- Rico Love – background vocals
- Beyoncé – featured artist
- Pusha T – featured artist
- Michelle Williams – featured artist
- Wiz Khalifa – featured artist

Creative

- Georges Antoni – photographer
- Sandy Brummels – creative director
- Todd Tourso – package designer
- Yu Tsai – cover photo creator, photographer
- Tim Weatherspoon – executive producer

Technical

- David Anderson – songwriter, keyboards, producer
- Jon-David "J.D. Anderson" – keyboards, songwriter, producer
- Marcella "Ms Lago" Araica – mixing technician, songwriter
- Diego Avendaño – assistant engineer
- Lonny Bereal – vocal producer
- Adam Beyrer – vocal engineer
- Lee Blaske – Keyboards
- Matthew Burnett – songwriter, instrumentation, producer, programming
- Noel Cadastre – mixing
- Andrew Coleman – digital arrangement, digital editing, engineer
- Kevin Cossom – songwriter, vocal producer
- Tom Coyne – mastering
- "Ben Billions" Diehl – producer, songwriter
- Jimmy Douglass – mixing
- Hart Gunther – engineer
- Andy Haller – engineer
- Andrew Harr – songwriter
- Courtney Harrell – songwriter
- Trehy Harris – assistant, mixing assistant
- Floyd Nathaniel Hills (Danja) – songwriter, producer
- Todd Hurtt – assistant engineer
- Jermaine Jackson – songwriter
- Brandon Jones – assistant engineer
- Jaycen Joshua – mixing technician
- Chris Kahn – assistant engineer
- Carlos King – engineer
- Mike Larson – engineer
- Richard "Rico Love" Butler – songwriter, producer
- Carlos "Los da Mystro" McKinney – songwriter, producer
- Jeremy McArthur – songwriter, drums, keyboards, producer, programming
- Thurston McCrea – vocal engineer
- Aya Merrill – mastering
- Marquel "Marz" Middlebrooks – songwriter, producer
- Joni Mitchell – songwriter
- Thabiso Nkhereanye – songwriter
- Terius "The-Dream" Nash – songwriter, producer
- Scott Naughton – engineer
- Jesus Rodriguez – assistant engineer
- Kelly Rowland – songwriter, executive producer
- The Runners – producers
- Harmony Samuels – songwriter, producer
- Matthew "Boi-1da" Samuels – instrumentation, producer, programming, songwriter
- Bart Schoudel – engineer
- Travis Sewchan – mixing assistant
- Amber Streeter – songwriter
- Myariah "Jane Handcock" Summers – songwriter
- Stacie Orrico - Vocals, songwriter
- Theron & Timothy Thomas – songwriters
- Cameron "Wiz Khalifa" Thomaz – songwriter
- Terrence "Pusha T" Thorton – songwriter
- Beau Vallis – engineer, vocal engineer
- Julian Vasquez – engineer
- Jeff "Supa Jeff" Villanueva – Pro-Tools
- Michael Williams (Mike Will Made It) – songwriter, producer
- Pharrell Williams – songwriter, producer
- Tyler "T-Minus" Williams – songwriter, producer

== Charts ==
=== Weekly charts ===
Weekly chart performance for Talk a Good Game
| Chart (2013) | Peak position |
|---|---|
| Australian Urban Albums (ARIA) | 16 |
| Belgian Albums (Ultratop Flanders) | 100 |
| Belgian Albums (Ultratop Wallonia) | 146 |
| Swiss Albums (Schweizer Hitparade) | 74 |
| UK Albums (Official Charts) | 80 |
| UK R&B Albums (Official Charts) | 7 |
| US Billboard 200 | 4 |
| US Top R&B/Hip-Hop Albums (Billboard) | 4 |

=== Year-end charts ===
Year-end chart performance for Talk a Good Game
| Chart (2013) | Position |
|---|---|
| US Billboard 200 | 164 |
| US Top R&B/Hip-Hop Albums (Billboard) | 37 |

== Release history ==
Release history and formats for Talk a Good Game
| Region | Date | Edition | Format | Label | Catalog | Ref. |
|---|---|---|---|---|---|---|
| Austria | June 14, 2013 | Standard; Deluxe | CD; digital download | Universal Music | 602537415168 | |
| Finland | June 14, 2013 | Standard; Deluxe | CD; digital download | Universal Music | 602537415168 | |
| Germany | June 14, 2013 | Standard; Deluxe | CD; digital download | Universal Music | 602537415168 | |
| Netherlands | June 14, 2013 | Standard; Deluxe | CD; digital download | Universal Music | 602537415168 | |
| Switzerland | June 14, 2013 | Standard; Deluxe | CD; digital download | Universal Music | 602537415168 | |
| Belgium | June 17, 2013 | Standard; Deluxe | CD; digital download | Universal Music | 602537415168 | |
| Denmark | June 17, 2013 | Standard; Deluxe | CD; digital download | Universal Music | 602537415168 | |
| France | June 17, 2013 | Standard; Deluxe | CD; digital download | Def Jam | 602537415168 | |
| Norway | June 17, 2013 | Standard; Deluxe | CD; digital download | Universal Music | 602537415168 | |
| Sweden | June 17, 2013 | Standard; Deluxe | CD; digital download | Universal Music | 602537415168 | |
| Italy | June 17, 2013 | Standard; Deluxe | CD; digital download | Universal Music | 602537415168 | |
| Spain | June 17, 2013 | Standard; Deluxe | CD; digital download | Universal Music | 602537415168 | |
| United Kingdom | June 17, 2013 | Standard; Deluxe | CD; digital download | Island | 602537415168 | |
| Canada | June 18, 2013 | Standard; Deluxe | CD; digital download | Universal Music | B001856902 | |
| United States | June 18, 2013 | Standard; Deluxe | CD; digital download | Republic | B001856702 | |
| Australia | June 21, 2013 | Standard; Deluxe | CD; digital download | Universal Music | B00CNIDH7K | |
| New Zealand | June 21, 2013 | Standard; Deluxe | CD; digital download | Universal Music | B00CNIDH7K | |
