= Representin =

Single by Ludacris featuring Kelly Rowland

from the album Ludaversal (intended)
- Released: October 9, 2012
- Recorded: 2012
- Studio: Circle House Studios (Miami, FL)
- Genre: Hip hop; R&B
- Length: 4:05
- Label: DTP; Def Jam South
- Songwriters: Christopher Bridges; Richard Butler; James Scheffer; Frank Romano; Michael Mule; Issac De Bonni
- Producers: Jim Jonsin; Rico Love

Ludacris singles chronology
"Jingalin" (2012)	"Representin" (2012)	"Rest of My Life" (2012)

Kelly Rowland singles chronology
"Ice" (2012)	"Representin'" (2012)	"Mama Told Me" (2012)

Music video
- "Representin" on YouTube

"Representin" is a song by American hip hop recording artist Ludacris, featuring vocals from American singer-songwriter Kelly Rowland. It was released October 9, 2012 in promotion of his ninth studio album, Ludaversal. It is a hip hop and R&B song. The song debuted and peaked at number 97 on the Billboard Hot 100 while reaching number 28 on the Hot R&B/Hip-Hop Songs. The official remix features the R&B singer R. Kelly and the American rapper Fabolous.

== Music video ==
A music video to accompany the release of "Representin" was first released onto YouTube on 29 October 2012 at a total length of four minutes and thirteen seconds.

== Track listing ==
Digital download
No.	Title	Length
1.	"Representin" (feat. Kelly Rowland)	4:05

=== Remix ===
Digital download
No.	Title	Length
1.	"Representin" (feat. R. Kelly & Fabolous)	3:37

== Chart performance ==
Chart (2012–13)	Peak position
South Korea International (Circle)	61
US Billboard Hot 100	97
US Hot R&B/Hip-Hop Songs (Billboard)	28
US Hot Rap Songs (Billboard)	20

== Release history ==
Region	Date	Format	Label
United States	October 9, 2012	Digital download	The Island Def Jam Music Group
United Kingdom	October 22, 2012	Digital download	The Island Def Jam Music Group
