= How Deep Is Your Love (Sean Paul song) =

Single by Sean Paul featuring Kelly Rowland

from the album Tomahawk Technique
- Released: 24 July 2012
- Recorded: 2012
- Genre: R&B; dancehall
- Length: 3:20
- Label: Atlantic
- Songwriters: Mikkel S. Eriksen; Jason Henriques; Ester Dean; Sean Paul Henriques
- Producer: Stargate

Sean Paul singles chronology
"Wine It Up" (2012)	"How Deep Is Your Love" (2012)	"Touch the Sky" (2012)

Kelly Rowland singles chronology
"Summer Dreaming 2012" (2012)	"How Deep Is Your Love" (2012)	"Ice" (2012)

"How Deep Is Your Love" is the fifth single from Jamaican rapper and singer Sean Paul's fifth studio album, Tomahawk Technique (2012), featuring American singer Kelly Rowland. It was written by Mikkel S. Eriksen, Jason Henriques, Ester Dean, Sean Paul Henriques and was produced by Stargate. It was released as a digital download in the United States on 24 July 2012. The song has charted in Switzerland and Austria.

== Chart performance ==
On 12 February 2012, the song entered the Swiss Singles Chart at number 72.

== Music video ==
A music video to accompany the release of "How Deep Is Your Love" was first released onto YouTube on 4 October 2012, at a total length of three minutes and twenty-seven seconds. The music video premiered on BET's 106 & Park on 2 October 2012, when Sean Paul visited the show to premiere the video.

== Credits and personnel ==
- Lead vocals – Sean Paul and Kelly Rowland
- Producers – Stargate
- Lyrics – Mikkel S. Eriksen, Jason Henriques, Ester Dean, Sean Paul Henriques
- Label: Atlantic Records

== Charts ==
Chart (2012)	Peak position
Austria (Ö3 Austria Top 40)	68
Bulgaria Airplay Chart	3
Switzerland (Schweizer Hitparade)	72

== Release history ==
Region	Date	Format	Label
United States	24 July 2012	Digital download	Atlantic Records
United Kingdom	10 December 2012	Digital download	Atlantic Records
