= Mama Told Me =

Single by Big Boi featuring Kelly Rowland

from the album Vicious Lies and Dangerous Rumors
- Released: October 9, 2012
- Genre: Pop rap
- Length: 3:12
- Label: Island Def Jam
- Songwriters: Erik Bodin; Chris Carmouche; Ricardo Lewis; Yukimi Nagano; Shelton Oliver; Antwan Patton; Ricky Walker; Fredrik Wallin; Jeron Ward; Håkan Wirenstrand
- Producers: The Flush; Chris Carmouche; Big Boi

Big Boi singles chronology
"She Said OK" (2012)	"Mama Told Me" (2012)	"Mic Mike" (2017)

Kelly Rowland singles chronology
"Representin" (2012)	"Mama Told Me" (2012)	"Neva End" (2012)

"Mama Told Me" is a song by American rapper Big Boi featuring singer Kelly Rowland, released as the lead single from his second studio album, Vicious Lies and Dangerous Rumors (2012). Co-written by Swedish synth-pop group Little Dragon, who appeared on the original version of the song, it is a 1980s electro funk record that serves as an ode to Big Boi's mother. Production on the song was handled by The Flush, while co-production was handled by Chris Carmouche and Big Boi himself.

"Mama Told Me" failed to enter any domestic charts, but peaked at number eight on the German Black Chart. The song appeared on the soundtrack to the video game MLB 13: The Show.

== Background ==
"Mama Told Me" was produced by The Flush, while co-production was handled by Chris Carmouche and Big Boi. The song originally featured Swedish synth-pop group Little Dragon, who co-wrote the song along with Big Boi and premiered the song with him in Austin, Texas, at an event hosted by Vitaminwater and The Fader in August 2012. Though Little Dragon's version was set to appear on the rapper's second solo album, the band was not featured on the final version due to "business terms out of our control". They were eventually replaced by American singer Kelly Rowland on the hook and bridge. On the concept of the 1980s electro funk record, Big Boi stated that "the song was basically an ode to my mom, just a lot of stuff she taught me coming up that made me the man I am today." The Linn Drum beat is a sample from Prince's 1982 track "Automatic."

== Music video ==
An accompanying music video, directed by Syndrome, was shot in Los Angeles, California against a green screen. It depicts Big Boi and Rowland in "a surreal fantasy land." The music video was released on November 21, 2012.

== Track listing ==
Digital download

1. "Mama Told Me" – 3:12

== Charts ==
The song peaked at number 8 on the German Black Chart during the week of January 11, 2013.

Chart (2012)	Peak position
Germany DBC (Deutsche Black Charts)	8
South Korea International (Circle)	81
