= Favor (Lonny Bereal song) =

Single by Lonny Bereal featuring Kelly Rowland

from the album The Love Train
- Released: May 17, 2011
- Recorded: 2010
- Genre: R&B
- Length: 3:41
- Label: Notifi Music Group
- Songwriters: Joseph Bereal, Chris Brown, Marlon Jean, Isaac P Jones, Kevin McCall, Teyana Taylor, Phillip Thornton
- Producer: Jai Marlon

Kelly Rowland singles chronology
"What a Feeling" (2011)	"Favor" (2011)	"Lay It on Me" (2011)

Music video
- "Favor" on YouTube

"Favor" is a song by American singer Lonny Bereal, featuring guest vocals from American singer Kelly Rowland. Originally recorded by Chris Brown and Teyana Taylor, it was released by Notifi Music Group as the lead single from his debut album The Love Train on May 17, 2011. "Favor" debuted at number 85 on the US Billboard Hot R&B/Hip-Hop Songs chart.

== Music video ==
A music video for "Favor" was first released onto YouTube on July 4, 2011 at with length of four minutes and five seconds. It was directed by Juwan Lee and produced by Adiclere Hunter.

== Track listing ==
Digital download
No.	Title	Length
1.	"Favor" (feat. Kelly Rowland)	3:41

== Charts ==
Chart (2011)	Peak position
US Hot R&B/Hip-Hop Songs (Billboard)	33

== Release history ==
Region	Date	Format	Label
United States	May 17, 2011	Digital download	Notifi Music Group
