= Bacardi Feeling (Summer Dreamin') =

1988 song by Kate Yanai

Single by Kate Yanai
- Released: 1991
- Length: 3:30
- Label: WEA
- Songwriters: Olivier Bloch-Lainé; Kate Markowitz; Joe Hammer; Christina Trulio
- Producer: Olivier Bloch-Lainé

"Bacardi Feeling (Summer Dreamin')" is a song by American recording artist Kate Yanai. Initially a Bacardi Rum jingle that she recorded for the European market in 1988, it became so popular that Yanai was asked to transform it into a song about "summer love" rather than rum. Arnold McCuller, David Lasley and Valerie Carter served as backing vocalists on the track, which subsequently reached number one in Austria and Germany.

== Track listings ==
- CD maxi single
1. "Bacardi Feeling (Summer Dreamin')" (radio version) – 3:30
2. "Bacardi Feeling (Summer Dreamin')" (Cocktail mix) – 5:33
3. "Bacardi Feeling" (original) – 3:10
4. "Bacardi Feeling (Summer Dreamin')" (instrumental) – 4:21
- 7-inch single
1. "Bacardi Feeling (Summer Dreamin')" (radio Version) – 3:01
2. "Bacardi Feeling" (original) – 2:10

== Charts ==
=== Weekly charts ===
Chart (1991)	Peak position
Austria (Ö3 Austria Top 40)	1
Europe (Eurochart Hot 100)	5
Europe (European Hit Radio)	31
Germany (GfK)	1
Switzerland (Schweizer Hitparade)	2

=== Year-end charts ===
Chart (1991)	Position
Austria (Ö3 Austria Top 40)	11
Europe (Eurochart Hot 100)	32
Germany (Media Control)	5
Switzerland (Schweizer Hitparade)	25

== Project B. version ==
"Summer Dreaming 2012"

Single by Project B. featuring Kelly Rowland
- Released: July 6, 2012
- Length: 3:24
- Label: Embassy of Music
- Songwriters: Olivier Bloch-Lainé, Kate Markowitz, Joe Hammer, Christina Trulio
- Producers: Marek Pompetzki, Paul NZA, Cecil Remmler

Kelly Rowland singles chronology
"Down for Whatever" (2011)	"Summer Dreaming 2012" (2012)	"How Deep Is Your Love" (2012)

In 2012, the song was re-recorded by American singer Kelly Rowland with German production team Project B., consisting of Marek Pompetzki, Paul NZA, and Cecil Remmler, to promote Bacardi. An accompanying music video was filmed in Barcelona, Spain, in June 2012.

=== Track listing ===
CD maxi single

1. "Summer Dreaming 2012" – 3:24
2. "Summer Dreaming 2012" (TV Mix) – 3:22
3. "Summer Dreaming 2012" (DJ Sergey Fisun Mix) – 3:13
4. "Summer Dreaming 2012" (Berlin Heights Retro Mix) – 2:55
5. "Summer Dreaming 2012" (Extended Mix) – 4:50

=== Charts ===
Chart (2012)	Peak position
Austria (Ö3 Austria Top 40)	52
Germany (GfK)	62
