= Kisses Down Low =

Single by Kelly Rowland

from the album Talk a Good Game
- Released: February 1, 2013
- Studio: Eardrum Studios (Atlanta, Georgia)
- Genre: Electropop; R&B
- Length: 4:14
- Label: Republic
- Songwriters: Kelly Rowland; Michael L. Williams II; Marquel Middlebrooks; Timothy Thomas; Theron Thomas
- Producers: Mike Will Made It; Marz

Kelly Rowland singles chronology
"Neva End" (2012)	"Kisses Down Low" (2013)	"Without Me" (2013)

"Kisses Down Low" is a song recorded by American singer-songwriter Kelly Rowland and is the first single from her fourth studio album Talk a Good Game. The song was written by Rowland, Marquel Middlebrooks, Timothy and Theron Thomas and Michael Williams, the latter of whom also produced the song under his production moniker, Mike WiLL Made It. Complimented for its lyrics about oral sex and steamy content, "Kisses Down Low" was released on February 1, 2013, serving as the lead single from Talk a Good Game. The song has been certified gold by the RIAA.

The Colin Tilley-directed music video features colorful scenes, featuring several different pin-up looks and multiple vibrant wigs and costumes. Critics noted similarities between the video for "Kisses Down Low" and "Say My Name" by Rowland's former group Destiny's Child

== Background and composition ==
Following the chart success of her Lil Wayne-backed single "Motivation" (2011), Rowland started to work on her upcoming fourth studio album. She said, "I'm in the studio. Man, it's been so much fun. I do wish that some of my fans could be in there for that ... [so] I have taped a lot of moments for my fans." She went on to add that the follow-up to her third album, Here I Am, will have a theme: "I made sure that I locked in on a concept and everyone that's come in to work on this album, we've all built around it. It's just building up so beautifully. I'm so proud! So I can't wait till all of my fans hear it." The song was written by Marquel Middlebrooks, Timothy Thomas, Theron Thomas, Kelly Rowland, Michael Williams with production helmed by Williams under his production name Mike WiLL Made It.

== Critical reception ==
A reviewer from Rap-Up described the song as a "bedroom banger". A writer for UK magazine Fact magazine wrote that "Kisses Down Low" as memorable as 2011 world-beater "'Motivation', [it's] a step-up from previous single, "Ice". Carl Williott of Idolator liked the song describing it as a "sluggishly shimmering track" and along with "Ice" "[it's] shaping up to be quite the steamy affair." Meanwhile, not all reviews for the song were positive, in a review in The Sowetan, an editor said that Rowland's vocals were stronger than what was displayed in "Kisses Down Low". The reviewer said "to be honest, the song, produced by Mike WiLL Made It, doesn't really challenge her vocal abilities, which we believe are a lot stronger, but who said a girl can't play around in the studio every now and then?!"

== Chart performance ==
In the United States "Kisses Down Low" debuted at number 96 on the Billboard Hot 100 for the issue dated March 10, 2013. On its third week the song peaked at number 72.

== Music video ==
=== Background ===
The music video for "Kisses Down Low" was directed by Colin Tilley. On February 10, 2013, Rowland posted behind-the-scenes video, Rowland spoke about the theme of the video saying, "I’m so excited about this video. The theme is fun and flirty and pinup. The makeup is poppin’, the hair is poppin’, the styling is so cool, but it feels just really flirty. I wanted to bring that out of the song instead of making it as racy." The video premiered on VEVO on March 12, 2013.

=== Synopsis ===
The video concept focuses on a number of vanity shots and costume changes. Various scenes from the video feature Rowland dressed as a pin-up girl, on a floral swing, with a curly blonde wig and hot pants. Another scenes features Rowland dressed in a red wig and retro bikini.

=== Reception ===
Sam Lansky from Idolator, gave the video a mixed review writing, " it's not the most thrilling video we’ve ever seen — all those splashy hues and chic looks don't entirely make up for a feeling that it's all a little insubstantial — but it's certainly not bad to look at." John Boone from E! Online compared the video to a number of other music videos by Rowland's former group Destiny's Child, in particular "Say My Name

== Track listings and formats ==
- Digital download
1. "Kisses Down Low" – 4:14

== Credits and personnel ==
Recording

- Vocals Recorded at Triangle Sound, Atlanta, Georgia
- Music recorded at Eardrum Studios, Atlanta, Georgia.
- Mixed at Larrabee Sound Studios, North Hollywood, California.
- Mastered at Sterling Sound, New York City, New York.

Personnel

- Sam Thomas - Recording Engineer

- Trehy Harris – assistant mixing engineer.
- Jaycen Joshua – mixing engineer.
- Beau Vallis – recording engineer.
- Marquel "Marz" Middlebrooks – co-producer, songwriter.
- Kelly Rowland – songwriter, lead vocals.
- Timothy and Theron Thomas (Rock City) – songwriter, additional vocals.
- Michael L. Williams (Mike Will Made It) – producer, songwriter.

== Charts ==
=== Weekly charts ===
Weekly chart performance for "Kisses Down Low"
Chart (2013)	Peak position
US Billboard Hot 100	72
US Hot R&B/Hip-Hop Songs (Billboard)	25
US Rhythmic Airplay (Billboard)	31

=== Year-end charts ===
Year-end chart performance for "Kisses Down Low"
Chart (2013)	Position
US Hot R&B/Hip-Hop Songs (Billboard)	67
US Hot R&B Songs (Billboard)	22

== Certifications ==
Region	Certification	Certified units/sales
New Zealand (RMNZ)	Gold	15,000^{‡}
United States (RIAA)	Gold	500,000^{‡}
^{‡} Sales+streaming figures based on certification alone.

== Release history ==
Release dates and formats for "Kisses Down Low"
Region	Date	Format(s)	Label(s)	Ref.
United States	February 1, 2013	Digital download	Republic	
United States	February 5, 2013	Urban contemporary radio	Republic	
Italy	February 8, 2013	Digital download	Universal Music	
Germany	February 11, 2013	Digital download	Universal Music	
United Kingdom	March 15, 2013	Digital download	Universal Island	
United States	March 26, 2013	Rhythmic contemporary radio	Republic	
