= Ice (Kelly Rowland song) =

Single by Kelly Rowland featuring Lil Wayne

from the album Talk a Good Game
- Released: August 14, 2012
- Genre: R&B; hip-hop
- Length: 4:09
- Label: Republic
- Songwriters: Dwayne Carter; Sean Garrett; Kelly Rowland; Noel "Detail" Fisher
- Producers: Noel "Detail" Fisher; Sean Garrett

Kelly Rowland singles chronology
"How Deep Is Your Love" (2012)	"Ice" (2012)	"Representin" (2012)

Lil Wayne singles chronology
"Enough of No Love" (2012)	"Ice" (2012)	"Celebration" (2012)

"Ice" is a song recorded by American singer-songwriter Kelly Rowland, featuring American rapper Lil Wayne. It was released on August 24, 2012. It was originally the lead single from Rowland's fourth studio album, Talk a Good Game (2013), however it did not make the album's final cut. The song was written by Rowland, Sean Garrett, Noel Fisher and Wayne, while the production was helmed by Garrett and Fisher. "Ice" is the third collaboration between Rowland and Wayne, following the Destiny's Child collaboration "Soldier" (2004), and her solo single "Motivation" (2011).

"Ice" is a midtempo R&B song, which features a thunderous beat, finger snaps and light synth riffs. In the song, Rowland instructs her male lover on how to properly use an ice cube on her naked body. "Ice" received positive reviews from music critics, who praised her sexy vocals and Rowland and Wayne for rekindling the magic of "Motivation". The song was moderately successful, reaching number 24 on the US Hot R&B/Hip-Hop Songs chart, and number 25 on the South Korea Gaon International Chart.

== Background and release ==
Following the chart success of her Lil Wayne-backed single "Motivation" (2011), Rowland started to work on her upcoming fourth studio album. She said, "I'm in the studio. Man, it's been so much fun. I do wish that some of my fans could be in there for that ... [so] I have taped a lot of moments for my fans." She went on to add that the follow-up to her third album, Here I Am, will have a theme: "I made sure that I locked in on a concept and everyone that's come in to work on this album, we've all built around it. It's just building up so beautifully. I'm so proud! So I can't wait till all of my fans hear it." On June 30, 2012, a two-minute preview of "Ice" leaked online. The full version leaked online on July 3, 2012, with Rowland tweeting: "Well, I guess you've heard #ICE... Thank you for the love and support. I'm sorry I kept yall waiting but I'm happy you love it the way I do!." On August 7, 2012, Rowland unveiled the cover art for the song. The image displays a steamy window upon which the song's title is inscribed. Rowland's name appears in oversized pink lettering as does Lil Wayne's just below. "Ice" was sent to urban radio in the United States on August 14, 2012, as the lead single from Rowland's upcoming fourth studio album, which at the time was intended to be titled Year of the Woman. It was released via iTunes Stores from August 24, 2012.

== Composition ==
"Ice" (2012)
A 24-second sample of "Ice", backed by a thunderous beat, finger snaps and light synths riffs.

"Ice" was written by Rowland, Sean Garrett, Noel Fisher and Lil Wayne, while the production was helmed by Fisher and Garrett. The song features guest vocals from Wayne, who previously collaborated with Rowland on "Motivation". "Ice" is a slow midtempo R&B song, also considered "a melodic ballad", which features a thunderous beat, finger snaps and light synth riffs. A reviewer of DJ Booth wrote that Rowland "uses a synth-driven and stripper-friendly beat from producer Detail to set the mood, letting the world know that her man’s love is so good it gives her the chills".

Lyrically, on the song, Rowland instructs her male lover on how to properly use an ice cube on her naked body. She sings: "When you come and lay between it this time / Take the ice cube (boy you know what) / Sit it right below my navel and watch what I do / And that’s my favorite angle / My legs are numb now / Your lovin’ be givin’ me chills". During the chorus, Rowland sings: "You're like ice, I-C-E / Feels so nice, scorching me". Wayne obliges Rowland with a few double-entrendres in his sexualized verse, "Uh, ice, ice baby / Shake that a — just like dice baby / You hot and I’m Tunechi / I beat the cat, animal cruelty". " Wayne continues rapping: "Pillow under her stomach, the other pillow she bite / Would you like anything? Cause I'll do anything you like".

== Critical reception ==
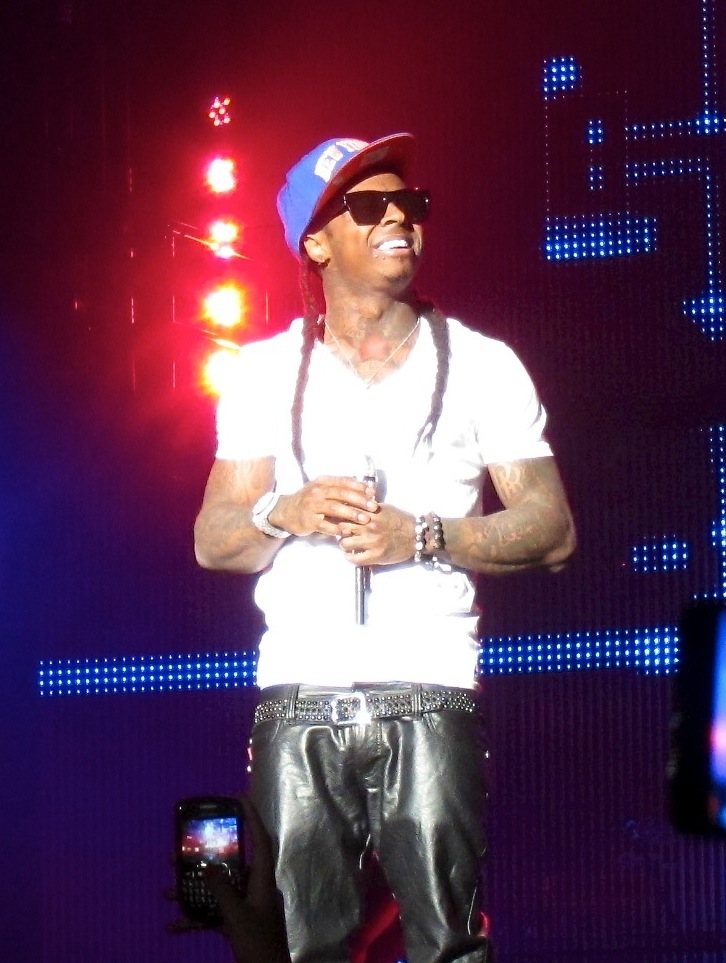
Lil Wayne previously collaborated on hit single, "Motivation", which critics say "Ice" is influenced by.

"Ice" received positive reviews from most music critics. Erika Ramirez of Billboard magazine wrote that "The slow winding song features both Ms. Kelly and Lil Wayne once again raising the temperature when behind closed doors." Rap-Up praised Rowland's vocals, writing, "The R&B diva melts the Sean Garrett-penned track with her sexy vocals." MTV UK agreed, writing "The sexy single features Kelly’s flawless vocals raising the room temperature whilst Weezy cools it down with his chilled flow." Following the same thoughts, Chris Eggersten of HitFix wrote that "'Ice' is a catchy tune that's held down by Rowland's solid vocal delivery and the unabashedly sexual lyrics that'll really fill your guilty pleasure quota for the evening." Trent Fitzgerald of PopCrush awarded it four out of five stars, writing "If you are looking for the perfect cool down then check out Kelly Rowland's new tune." Fitzgerald continued writing, "Only time will tell if ‘Ice’ will catch on and give Rowland another No. 1 R&B/Hip-Hop hit, but it does have potential." X. Alexander of Idolator realized that "it is reminiscent of the sizzling 'Motivation' (which is a very good thing)". Robbie Daw also writing from the same publication commented that "this new song just might trump the pair's previous collaboration in the Sexy Department." Nathan S. of DJ Booth praised Lil Wayne for "delivering punchline-heavy rhymes that give 'ICE's cool attitude a little heat".

However, Katherine St Asaph of Pop Dust gave the song 2.5 out of five stars, writing that the song "is more like a bath drawn and left to cool. That’s why the chorus (and the very first lyrics) can start with something as underwritten as 'you’re like ice, I-C-E, feels so nice', why the only surprise about the ice-cube play is how unceremoniously it enters the picture, why Wayne can get away with essentially the same thing he did last time around". Kyle Anderson of Entertainment Weekly gave "Ice" a B rating and commented that "Wayne's verse is lukewarm, but her confident control over this kinky sex jam keeps the focus more on carnal desires, and less on potential frostbite."

== Chart performance ==
"Ice" made its debut on the US Hot R&B/Hip-Hop Songs chart, before being released for digital download. After the release, the song climbed from number 55 to number 50 and jumped from number 41 to number 26, where it peaked. On the US Billboard Hot 100 chart,"Ice" debuted at number 100. Although the song fell off the chart the following week but once again the song re-entered Hot 100 at number 100 and later peaked at number 88. For the week ending September 2, 2012, "Ice" debuted at number 72 on the South Korea Gaon International Chart as her first ever charting single there. The following week, it peaked at number 25, with a total sales of 12,425 units.

== Music video ==
The music video for the song premiered on BET's 106 & Park on November 14, 2012, and was directed by Matthew Rolston. Lil Wayne does not appear in the video with Kelly Rowland, but she performs with background dancers.

== Track listing ==
- Digital download – Clean
1. "Ice" (featuring Lil Wayne) – 4:09
- Digital download – Explicit
1. "Ice" (featuring Lil Wayne) – 4:09

== Charts ==
=== Weekly charts ===
Weekly chart performance for "Ice"
Chart (2012–13)	Peak position
Netherlands (Urban Top 100)	5
South Korea International (Gaon)	25
US Billboard Hot 100	88
US Hot R&B/Hip-Hop Songs (Billboard)	24

=== Year-end charts ===
Year-end chart performance for "Ice"
Chart (2012)	Position
US Hot R&B/Hip-Hop Songs (Billboard)	92

== Release history ==
Release dates and formats for "Ice"
Country	Date	Format	Label	Ref.
United States	August 14, 2012	Urban radio	Republic Records	
Ireland	August 24, 2012	Digital download	Universal Music	
United Kingdom	August 26, 2012	Digital download	Universal Island	
United States	August 28, 2012	Digital download	Republic Records	
United States	October 16, 2012	Rhythmic radio	Republic Records	
