= Ms. Kelly: Diva Deluxe =

EP by Kelly Rowland
- Released: March 18, 2008
- Recorded: 2006–2008
- Genre: R&B
- Length: 27:14
- Labels: Columbia; Music World
- Producers: S*A*M & Sluggo; Stargate; Jeff Dawson; Redline

Kelly Rowland chronology
Ms. Kelly (2007)	Ms. Kelly: Diva Deluxe (2008)	Here I Am (2011)

Singles from Ms. Kelly: Diva Deluxe
- 1. "Daylight" Released: January 22, 2008

Ms. Kelly: Diva Deluxe (stylized as Ms. Kelly • Diva Deluxe) is the first extended play (EP) by the American singer Kelly Rowland, following her first two full-length albums. It was released on March 18, 2008, through Columbia Records in collaboration with Music World Entertainment and Sony BMG Music Entertainment. A digital-only collection of new songs and previously unreleased remixes, it became available exclusively through major online digital music providers. Initially planned to be included on a reissue of Rowland's second solo album, Ms. Kelly (2007), she announced that the eight tracks would be included on a standalone release. A deluxe edition of the original album, entitled Ms. Kelly Deluxe, was released on May 7, 2008.

== Background and development ==
Kelly Rowland's second solo album Ms. Kelly was released in June 2007. Not as successful as its predecessor Simply Deep (2002), the album produced the hit singles "Like This" and "Work". Originally entitled My Story, the album's first version was actually scheduled for a June 2006 release, but the singer, her management and Columbia Records decided to shelve the album at the last minute to re-work a version with a different vibe as the singer considered the final track listing "too full of midtempos and ballads." Rowland eventually consulted additional producers to collaborate on the album, renamed Ms. Kelly, including Billy Mann, Scott Storch, and Atlanta-based Polow da Don who contributed to "Like This", a collaboration with rapper Eve. A moderate success around the globe, the song reached the top-ten in Ireland and the UK, and the top-twenty in Australia and New Zealand. Upon its release, Ms. Kelly debuted at number six on the Billboard 200, and number two on the Top R&B/Hip-Hop Albums chart, with moderately successful first week sales of 86,000 copies. Outside the US, the album widely failed to reprise the success of Simply Deep, barely reaching the top-forty on the majority of all charts it appeared on, except for the UK, where it opened at number 37.

In October 2007, Rowland collaborated with Travis McCoy from American rap rock group Gym Class Heroes on "Daylight", a cover version of Bobby Womack's 1976 single. Actually recorded for the soundtrack for French film Asterix at the Olympic Games (2008), Rowland was so satisfied with the track, that she felt inspired to start work on a reissue of Ms. Kelly. During the ecoStyle's Fundraising Gala held at the Mandarin Oriental Hotel in December 2007, Rowland confirmed that "Daylight" would serve as the first single from the re-release and commented on Ms. Kelly's commercial underperformance: "It was difficult at first, but then I realised that it wasn't my fault. The reason I say it wasn't my fault is that we live in a very different music industry right now. It's tough to sell records without having someone download it. Also, first time around, the label didn't see what I saw in the record. It took them a while to get it, but now everyone's on board and excited at the album, so I'm happy that everyone's on the same page this time around." When asked why she decided to re-release the album and not record a new one instead, Rowland stated that despite its revamp it was simply because she felt the final track list consisted of too many midtempos and ballads, "I didn't realise it while I was recording it. After it was released [back in June] many fans said the songs would rock if they were more upbeat. I guess that might have been the cause of the poor acceptance to Ms. Kelly the first time around version."

== Recording and composition ==
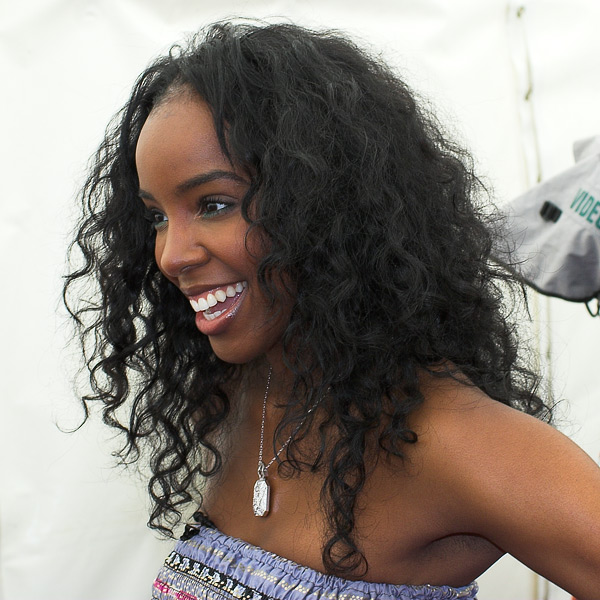
Rowland felt she "wanted to give the album a second life, because it didn't get the exposure that I wanted it to first time round."

Following the original album's lukewarm sales and reception, Rowland re-entered recording studios to collect new songs for the reissue. The first song to be recorded, Rowland found that "Daylight" set much of the tone for the EP. One of her personal favorites on the Diva Deluxe, she stated that "with "Daylight," I remember listening to [it] and I was like, 'Oh my god, this feels like a great day. Got the wind in your hair, just feels good.' That's what I loved about it the most." Commenting on her decision to work with Travis McCoy, she told Blues & Soul. "I figured me and Travis together would be an unusual tyepa duo. And I'm really happy I trusted my instincts. Because it turned out to be a really cool, different type of collaboration." Produced by Norwegian production duo Stargate, Digital Spy felt that second track "Broken", was "a typically polished offering from the [producer's] hit factory". A piano-driven mid-tempo cut, the song was co-penned by Lonny Bereal and Tariano Jackson. Rowland described the ballads "Love Again" and "Unity" as songs "that are just really vulnerable, and I feel like those are also sides of me that I get a chance to showcase as well." Not specifically recorded for Diva Deluxe, the former was originally included on the track listing of the soundtrack to Tyler Perry's 2008 film Meet the Browns.

Producers and songwriters S*A*M & Sluggo, Jeff Dawson, brothers Charlie and Kenneth Bereal, Damon Sharpe, and Mark J. Feist also consulted on the album, the latter two of which contributed the EP's final track "No Man No Cry." While she hoped "to collaborate with other great producers like Timbaland just to freshen up [her] sound a little more," further studio sessions failed to materialize. Rowland was also expected to record with producer Danja, but deadline pressure prevented from happening. A new track by J. R. Rotem, on the other hand, did not make the final cut.

== Release and promotion ==
A collection of new songs and remixes, Ms. Kelly: Diva Deluxe was made available exclusively through all major online digital music providers on Tuesday, March 18, 2008. Speaking on its digital-only release, Rowland stated, "That's where all my fans are. I think that it's important to be accommodating to them and they're not physically going to buy records as much as they would being in front of the computer and just purchasing it that way." Regarding the title Diva Deluxe, Rowland said, "I felt like there was so much more to offer on this record as far as different sounds are concerned. I did dance mixes. I did songs on the album that the fans will probably never expect, so I had to put that diva stank on there." In the United Kingdom, the EP was released a week later. On September 22, 2008, Diva Deluxe was released in German-speaking Europe.

== Track listing ==
No.	Title	Writer(s)	Producer(s)	Length
1.	"Daylight" (featuring Travis McCoy)	Harold Payne; Bobby Womack; Travis McCoy	S*A*M & Sluggo	3:30
2.	"Broken"	Kelly Rowland; Joseph Bereal; Tim Blacksmith; Mikkel Eriksen; Tor Erik Hermansen; P.T. Jackson	Stargate	3:24
3.	"Comeback" (Karmatronics club mix)	Rowland; Scott Storch; Jason Boyd; Lyndrea Price	Storch; Pooh Bear^{[a]}; Achilles Sparta^{[b]}; Peter Krajezar^{[b]}	6:20
4.	"Like This" (Redline remix)	Rowland; Sean Garrett; Eve Jeffers; Jamal Jones; Jason Perry; Elvis Williams	Polow da Don; Garrett^{[a]}; Perry^{[a]}; S-Dot^{[a]}; Blac Elvis^{[a]}; Redline^{[b]}	2:50
5.	"Love Again"	Charlie Bereal; J. Bereal; Charmelle Cofield; Phil Thornton; Roy Battle; Cheyenne Jones	Battle Roy; Lonny Bereal^{[a]}	3:50
6.	"Unity"	Jordan Thorsteinson; Troy Samson; Mike James	Jeff Dawson	3:51
7.	"No Man No Cry"	Mark J. Feist; Damon Sharpe; Lauren Evans	Feist; Sharpe	3:28
Total length:				27:14

Notes

- ^{^[a]} signifies a co-producer
- ^{^[b]} signifies an additional producer

== Credits and personnel ==
Credits are taken from the album's liner notes.

Instruments and performances

- Background vocals – Lonny Bereal, Ben Levels, Travis McCoy
- Conduction – Jennifer Gray
- Drums – Matt McGinley
- Guitar – Disashi Lumumba-Kasongo, Sean Gould
- Keyboards – Ben Levels

Managerial and production

- Executive producers – Kelly Rowland, Mathew Knowles
- Management – Mathew Knowles
- Vocal production – Lonny Bereal, Mike James, Kelly Rowland, Troy Samson

== Release history ==
Region	Date	Format	Label(s)	Ref.
United States	March 18, 2008	Digital download	Columbia; Music World	
United Kingdom	March 25, 2008	Digital download	Sony BMG	
Austria	September 22, 2008	Digital download	Sony BMG	
Germany	September 22, 2008	Digital download	Sony BMG	
Switzerland	September 22, 2008	Digital download	Sony BMG	
