= Ms. Kelly =

Studio album by Kelly Rowland
- Released: June 20, 2007
- Recorded: 2006
- Studios: The Hit Factory (Miami, FL); Music World Studios (Houston, TX); Silent Sound Recording Studios (Atlanta, GA); Doppler Studios (Atlanta, GA); Record Plant (Hollywood, CA); Tha Cathedral (Hollywood, CA); Sony Music Studios (New York, NY); Circle House Studios (Miami, FL); South Beach Studios (Miami, FL); Paragon Studios (Franklin, TN); Roc the Mic Studios (New York, NY); Fresh Kills (New York, NY)
- Genre: R&B
- Length: 42:58 (standard); 54:57 (deluxe)
- Labels: Music World; Columbia; Sony BMG
- Producers: Kelly Rowland; CKB; Jeff Dawson; Loren Dawson; Mark Feist; Damon Sharpe; Sean Garrett; Billy Mann; Mysto & Pizzi; Polow da Don; Rockwilder; Scott Storch; Soulshock & Karlin; Stargate; Tank; Jason "Poo Bear" Boyd

Kelly Rowland chronology
Simply Deep (2002)	Ms. Kelly (2007)	Ms. Kelly: Diva Deluxe (2008)

Singles from Ms. Kelly
- 1. "Like This" Released: March 13, 2007; 2. "Ghetto" Released: August 7, 2007; 3. "Work" Released: January 21, 2008

Ms. Kelly is the second album by the American singer Kelly Rowland. It was released on June 20, 2007, through Columbia Records, in collaboration with Music World Entertainment. Originally titled My Story and expected for a mid-2006 release, the project was retitled and delayed until 2007. Determined to produce a more personal effort than her debut Simply Deep (2002), Rowland contributed nine tracks to the reworked Ms. Kelly, which took her solo work further into urban music markets, involving production by Scott Storch, Polow da Don, Soulshock & Karlin and Tank, among others.

Upon its release, Ms. Kelly received generally positive reviews from most music critics and achieved reasonable commercial success, debuting at number six on the US Billboard 200 and at number two on the US Top R&B/Hip-Hop Albums, selling 86,000 copies in its first week, being Rowland's highest first-week sales with a studio album to date in the US. As a consequence, Columbia released three Deluxe reissues of the album the following year – an extended play (EP) Ms. Kelly: Diva Deluxe, Ms. Kelly: Deluxe Edition and another extended play Ms. Kelly: Digital Deluxe – containing previously unreleased songs and remixes. Exclusively at Walmart, Ms. Kelly was packaged with a bonus DVD titled BET Presents Kelly Rowland (2007). The DVD features BET and performance highlights, and music videos from Rowland's solo career.

== Background ==
In 2002, Kelly Rowland teamed up with rapper Nelly to record the chorus and vocals on the track "Dilemma" for his album Nellyville. Released as the album's second single, the song became one of the most successful singles of the year, topping various charts worldwide, including the US Billboard Hot 100. Originally scheduled to be released in early 2003, the success of the collaboration caused the label to extend the release date of Rowland's debut solo album Simply Deep, which Rowland rushed within three weeks to get done and was described as alternative R&B. Released in the United States in October 2002 and internationally in 2003, Simply Deep was certified gold by the Recording Industry Association of America (RIAA), and has sold 602,000 copies in the United States. Released to an even bigger success in international territories, the album topped the UK Albums Chart and became a gold-seller in Australia, Canada, and New Zealand, resulting in worldwide sales total of two and a half million copies. The album yielded three singles. "Stole", a pop rock-influenced mid-tempo track about loss, was released as the album's lead single and became an international top-ten hit single, peaking at number two in Australia and the United Kingdom. In the United States, the song failed to capitalize on the success of "Dilemma", reaching the top-thirty only.

After a three-year hiatus that involved concentration on individual solo projects, Rowland rejoined Beyoncé Knowles and Michelle Williams for Destiny's Child's final studio album Destiny Fulfilled, released in November 2004. Meanwhile, Rowland had started work on the conception of her second solo studio album. She began collaborating with songwriter-producer Bryan Michael Cox, partner WyldCard, and production duo CKB. Some of their early recordings, including "Bad Habit" and "Flashback", were later included on Destiny's Child's final studio album as well as the group's live DVD Live in Atlanta (2006), respectively. As she was anxious to avoid hasty productions as on her previous album, which Rowland felt was less personal, she took a wider role in the production of the album; the singer co-wrote the majority of the songs and shared ideas in which one to produce. "I wrote a lot on this record [...] and it's especially from me [to my fans]," she told CNN about the album. "It's a feelgood record; very intimate. It's a sneak peak[sic] into my mind and heart of the past three or four years."

== Music and lyrics ==
After the rock–dance sound which dominated her previous album Simply Deep, Rowland felt she was still struggling with finding her sound as solo artist, and instead of capitalizing off its international success, the singer and her management settled on "a more urban approach" with her second album. Commenting on her decision, Rowland later told MTV News, "in general, I'm going in the urban, more R&B route. Of course, that's what I started with Destiny's Child, [but on] my first solo album I did more of a pop-sounding record. So I wanted to go back to my roots and dibble and dabble with some beats." Consequently, Columbia Records consulted a wider range of contemporary R&B and hip-hop producers and artists such as Big Tank, Patrick "J. Que" Smith, Rockwilder, Rich Harrison, Rodney Jerkins, and Robin Thicke to work with Rowland on the album. Female rapper Eve, also lent her voice to a guest part.

Lyrically, love, independence, and maturity became reoccurring themes throughout the album. With songs such as "'I'm Still in Love with My Ex" and "Better Without You" inspired by Rowland's former relationship with American football player Roy Williams, most of the tracks Rowland recorded were relationship-driven, something she said she was not hesitant about discussing. "I just went in the studio and just did me, because I think that's when you get your best product. That's when it's just natural. It just flew out of my mouth and came out in lyrics [and] I had great writers involved." While recording her vocals, Rowland was inspired by several singers, citing former bandmate Beyoncé Knowles, and singers Brandy and Whitney Houston as major inspirations, "I listened to a lot of Whitney Houston for her vocals. I love her. I love Beyoncé's voice, and I love Brandy. Those are three vocalists who inspire me. I love how different they are. I love how they take themselves to the next level."

=== Songs ===
"Like This" (2007)
Rowland's first solo release in four years scored moderate success on international territories.

"Work" (2007)
The album's second international single received greater success than the lead single but was not released stateside.

Opening song and lead single "Like This", which features rap from Eve, was one of the last songs recorded for Ms. Kelly. Noted for the use of a cowbell in its melody, the single was first released in March 2007 to mixed reviews and became Rowland's highest-charting solo single since "Stole" (2002). The second track, titled "Comeback", is one of the two tracks Scott Storch contributed to the album. Planned to be released as the album's second single, Rowland shot a music video for the track with director Philip Andelman in July 2007. When a single release failed to materialize, the video premiered on Rowland's official YouTube account in early 2008. "Ghetto" is set as the third track and features rapper Snoop Dogg. Originally recorded for the shelved My Story, the crunk-influenced track was released as the album's second single in North America in August 2007, where it achieved minor success, reaching number nine on the US Billboard Bubbling Under R&B/Hip-Hop Singles only. The album's fourth track, "Work", was written after returning from a night out in Miami and rushed in "like twenty minutes." An up-tempo composition featuring funk production and go-go elements, it was released as the album's second international single during the first quarter of 2008 and enjoyed major international commercial success, emerging as the highest-charting single off the album. Synthesized "Flashback" is the fifth track of the album and had previously appeared on Destiny's Child's video album Live in Atlanta (2006). Released to generally lukewarm reviews, the San Francisco Chronicle called it "positively lackluster". "Every Thought Is You", a ballad produced by Rockwilder, garanered positive critics, with About.com noting it "a classy, well-sung mid-tempo track about healthy infatuation". The seventh track "The Show" features a guest appearance by singer Tank, who produced the track. It's followed by a one-minute-long interlude. The ninth track "Still in Love with My Ex" was rumored to be about Rowland's ex-fiancée Roy Williams. The tenth track "Better Without You" speaks about a protagonist who feels better after ending a relationship. It's followed by the eleventh track "Love", and the album closes with a love song "This Is Love".

== Release and promotion ==
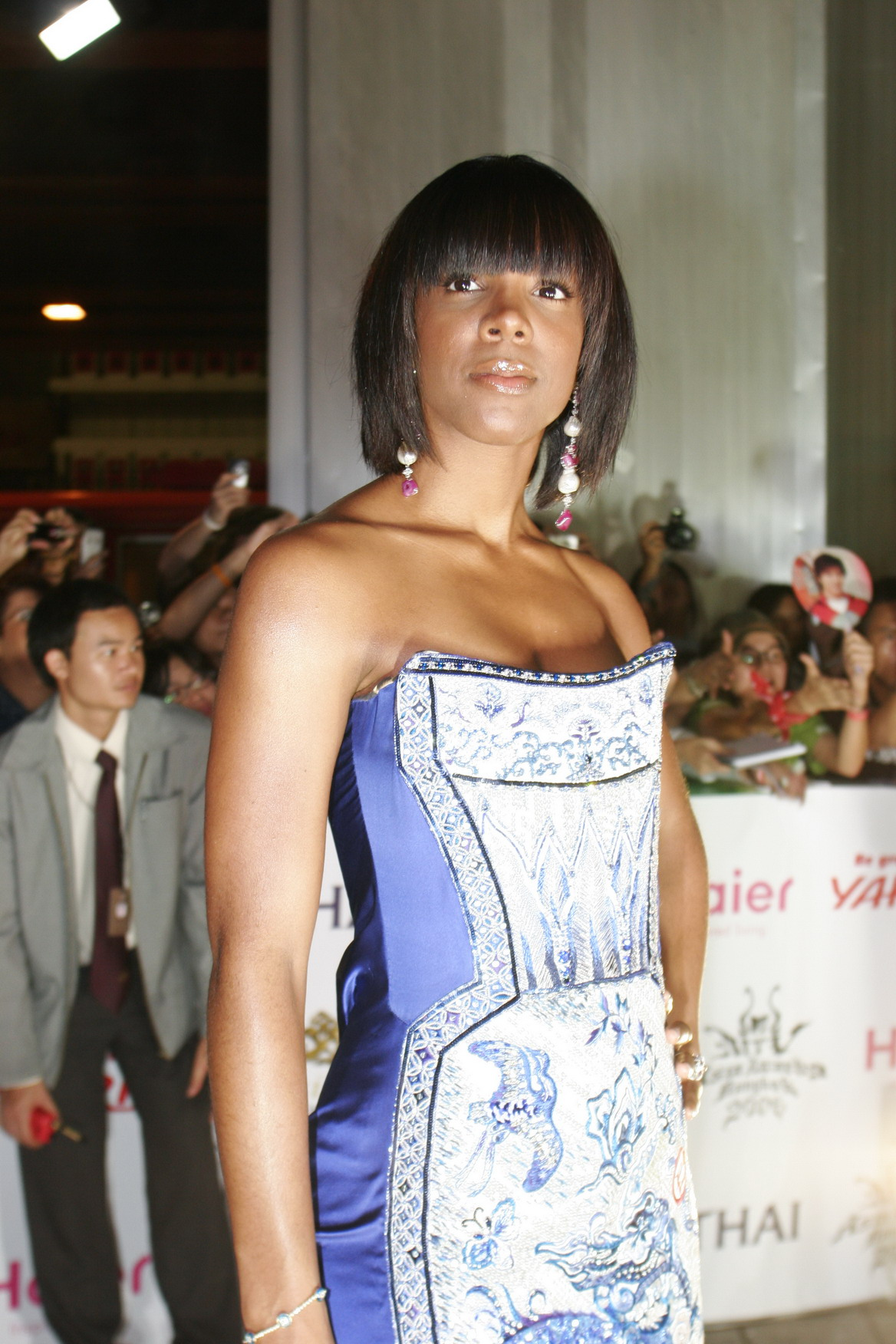
Rowland premiered "Gotsta Go" at the MTV Asia Awards 2006 on May 6, 2006, in Bangkok, Thailand.

Originally expected for a March 2006 release, the album had two title changes and three unofficial releases until its official release the following year. Initially scheduled for a July 11, 2006 release, the album's original draft, entitled My Story, was eventually shelved in favor of a revamped version with a different vibe. Although manager Mathew Knowles initially insisted that the decision to push the release date from July 2006 was because more time would be needed to properly set up the project, Rowland later admitted that she had been unsatisfied with the album's direction, and thus, she asked to rework with a stable of new record producers on the project. Speaking of the delay and the original track listing, she told Billboard: "it was basically a list of songs that I put together about the past three years of my life, with love and relationships", and added: "And I remember listening to the record, and I was just like, 'I don't want this to be too deep to where, you know, [I] lose people.' And the record was too full of midtempos and ballads, so I wanted to bring it up a little bit."

Her decision led to the cancellation of the album's original leading single "Gotsta Go", a collaboration with rapper Da Brat that she premiered on the MTV Asia Awards 2006 Bangkok on May 6, 2006. Rowland eventually consulted new producers to collaborate on the album, including Mysto & Pizzi, Sean Garrett, Scott Storch, and Atlanta-based Polow da Don, who contributed the single "Like This," a duet with rapper Eve, to the album. In addition, the singer decided to retitle the album. She stated: "I really put my heart and soul into this record and not only am I excited that everyone's going to hear the music, I'm looking forward to people getting to hear the real me. That's the reason I called the album Ms. Kelly. Because the title is all about respect, being an adult and that's how I feel about my life, and my music."

Other promotional efforts included a sophomore CD teaser in Live in Atlanta features. "Flashback" was also included on an audio disc packaged with the DVD.

=== Singles ===
Recorded late into the production of the album, Rowland and her management chose "Like This" as the lead single off Ms. Kelly. Moderately successful on the charts, the song reached the top ten in Canada, Ireland, and the United Kingdom, and dominated the US Dance Club Songs. "Comeback" was sent to urban radio on July 30, 2007, as the album's second single in the United States, while "Work" was released as the second international single and achieved greater success than "Like This". Pushed by a newly produced Freemasons remix, it reached the top ten on the majority of all European and Oceanic music charts. "Ghetto", featuring Snoop Dogg, followed with minor to no commercial success stateside. The album produced previously unreleased "Daylight" as fourth and final single; it became a top twenty success in the United Kingdom and helped introducing the Diva Deluxe reissue. Although never released as a single, Rowland shot a music video for "Comeback" back-to-back with the video for "Work". The track was originally planned to be released as the album's second single alongside ballad "Still in Love with My Ex". In a fan poll to determine the second single of the album, "Still in Love with My Ex" was chosen. This never materialized, however.

=== Tour ===
The Ms. Kelly Tour was Rowland's first North American tour. She had previously headlined an exclusive European Simply Deeper Tour (2003) for her debut solo album, Simply Deep. The Ms. Kelly Tour was originally scheduled to hit fifteen cities between October 2007 and December 2007, with a three-night finale in Las Vegas. However, three scheduled tour dates were cancelled with no ticket refunds. R&B singer Mario was the tour's opening act.

== Critical reception ==
Professional ratings
Aggregate scores
Source	Rating
Metacritic	70/100
Review scores
Source	Rating
About.com	2.5/5 stars
AllMusic	3/5 stars
Digital Spy	2/5 stars
Dotmusic	6/10
Entertainment Weekly	B+
Gigwise	3.5/5 stars
The Guardian	4/5 stars
New York Post	3/4 stars
Newsday	B
Slant Magazine	3/5 stars

Ms. Kelly received generally positive reviews from music critics. At Metacritic, which assigns a weighted mean rating out of hundred to reviews from mainstream critics, the album received an average score of seventy, based on ten reviews. Alex Macpherson of The Guardian gave the album four and a half stars out of five. He complimented Ms. Kelly as "poised, dignified and completely lacking in the hysteria normally associated with R&B divas giving vent to their feelings" but felt that "the emotions simmering beneath her glassy, controlled tones are as raw as any Mary J. Blige classic." Ben Williams of the New York Post referred the album as a "mostly upbeat record that soulfully delves into contemporary funk", while Entertainment Weekly found that "after a blah solo debut with 2002's Simply Deep, Kelly Rowland — assisted by producers like Scott Storch and Polow Da Don — brings the noise and the funk to her vibrant follow-up. Newsday writer Glenn Gamboa remarked that with Ms. Kelly, Rowland "doesn't dabble in various genres. She doesn't try to push the envelope. Rowland does what she does best: She cranks out one potential pop hit after another. Ms. Kelly shows that Rowland knows her strengths and that she intends to keep playing to them."

Andy Kellman from AllMusic found that Ms. Kelly "sounds like an album where Rowland is mostly sorting through some deeply personal relationship issues with a couple relatively lighthearted songs thrown in for variety." He noted that "all-around, the album does provide a stronger set of songs than 2002's Simply Deep. The material tends to be kind of insidious, rather than hitting you immediately or going through one ear and out the other." Giving the album three stars out of five, he also remarked that "the lyrics [...] are direct and specific, going beyond basic breakup material." Slant Magazine's Sal Cinquemani stated that, "this time around, both the production and lyrics are stronger." He praised the "bona fide club jams" on the album. Billboard wrote that while "Rowland may never upstage her superstar groupmate Beyonce, but she certainly has the vocal chops and charm to stand on her own stiletto-clad feet. Compared with her gospel-fueled 2002 solo debut, Rowland appears confident and dominant on foot-stompers [and] though still short of career-defining, Ms. Kelly finds its author opening up more while welcoming the possibility that destiny may just find another star.

In a mixed review for About.com, Mark Edward Nero characterized the album as "basically one by someone with the persona of a backup player who's been thrust in a lead role." While he praised songs such as "Work" and "Like This," Nero felt that the album contained too many "weak songs" and that Rowland, "although she may feel comfortable in the role, can't carry the full weight — just like Scottie Pippen never could with the [Chicago] Bulls." Dotmusic's Jaime Gill called Ms. Kelly "old-fashioned", writing that "Rowland's big problem is that she has the lungs but not the voice [...] She can holler like Beyoncé, growl like Kelis or swoon like Aaliyah, but has little to no natural style of her own." Ken Capobianco's review for The Boston Globe was more emphatic dubbing it "a solid if somewhat safe set of grooves, but the album never takes full flight to become something special."

== Commercial performance ==
Ms. Kelly was listed for thirty-three weeks on nine different charts. It made its first appearance on the Irish Top 75, Dutch Top 100 and Swiss Top 100. Its highest peak position worldwide was number six on the US Billboard 200, selling 86,000 units in its first week and becoming Rowland's highest entry on the chart. The album spent eleven weeks inside the chart. By July 2011, Ms. Kelly had sold 222,000 copies in the United States.

Outside the United States, the album failed to enter the top forty of the majority of the charts it appeared on, except in the United Kingdom, where it debuted at number thirty-seven on the UK Albums Chart. The standard edition of the album sold 24,424 in the United Kingdom as of 2008. In Brazil, the album opened at thirty-seven; it also peaked at number ten on the Japanese International Albums Chart. The album struggled to appear in the top-fifty of the ARIA Albums Chart in Australia, peaking at number forty-four after several weeks on the chart. However, the album reached the top ten on the Australian Urban Albums, peaking at number eight.

The reissue, titled Ms. Kelly: Diva Deluxe, charted for three weeks on the top seventy-five UK Albums Chart, entering the chart at number twenty-three. It charted significantly higher internationally, peaking two weeks later on the European Top 100 Albums chart at number eighty.

== Track listing ==
Ms. Kelly – Standard edition
No.	Title	Writer(s)	Producer(s)	Length
1.	"Like This" (featuring Eve)	Kelly Rowland; Sean Garrett; Eve Jeffers; Jamal Jones; Jason Perry; Elvis Williams	Polow da Don; Garrett^{[a]}; Perry^{[a]}; S-Dot^{[a]}; Blac Elvis^{[a]}	3:39
2.	"Comeback"	Rowland; Scott Storch; Jason Boyd; Lyndrea Price	Storch; Pooh Bear^{[a]}	3:26
3.	"Ghetto" (featuring Snoop Dogg)	Rowland; Durrell Babbs; Joseph Bereal; Calvin Broadus	Tank	2:55
4.	"Work"	Rowland; Storch; Boyd	Storch; Pooh Bear^{[a]}	3:28
5.	"Flashback"	Rowland; Charles Bereal; Kenneth Bereal; Joseph Bereal; Huy Nguyen; Britney Jackson	CKB	4:21
6.	"Every Thought Is You"	Rowland; Dana Stinson; Loren Dawson; J. Bereal; Billy Mann; Nguyen; Shalondra Buckines	L. Dawson; Rockwilder	3:56
7.	"The Show" (featuring Tank)	Rowland; Babbs; J. Bereal	Tank	3:36
8.	"Interlude"	Rowland; Carsten Schack; Kenneth Karlin; J. Bereal; Mann; Price	Mann	1:00
9.	"Still in Love with My Ex"	Rowland; Schack; Karlin; J. Bereal; Mann; Price	Soulshock & Karlin	3:38
10.	"Love"	Slav Vynnytsky; Marc Joseph; Solange Knowles	Mysto & Pizzi; Knowles	3:51
11.	"Better Without You"	C. Bereal; K. Bereal; J. Bereal; Charmelle Cofield	CKB	3:57
12.	"This Is Love"	Mann	Mann	4:50
Total length:				42:58

Ms. Kelly – Special premium edition (bonus download)
No.	Title	Writer(s)	Producer(s)	Length
13.	"Like This" (DJ Speedy Remix) (featuring Sean P and Eve)	Rowland; Garrett; Jeffers; Jones; Perry; Williams; Sean Paul	Polow da Don; Garrett^{[a]}; Perry^{[a]}; S-Dot^{[a]}; Elvis^{[a]}; DJ Speedy^{[b]}	4:13
Total length:				47:11

Ms. Kelly – Japanese edition (bonus track)
No.	Title	Writer(s)	Producer(s)	Length
13.	"Dilemma" (with Nelly)	Cornell Haynes Jr.; Bunny Sigler; Kenny Gamble	BAM & Ryan	4:49
Total length:				47:07

Ms. Kelly – iTunes Store edition (bonus tracks)
No.	Title	Writer(s)	Producer(s)	Length
13.	"Like This" (Azza's Nu Soul remix)	Rowland; Garrett; Jeffers; Jones; Perry; Williams	Polow da Don; Garrett^{[a]}; Perry^{[a]}; S-Dot^{[a]}; Elvis^{[a]}; Azza^{[b]}	3:54
14.	"Like This" (music video)	Rowland; Garrett; Jeffers; Jones; Perry; Williams		3:37
Total length:				49:49

Ms. Kelly – International edition (bonus track)
No.	Title	Writer(s)	Producer(s)	Length
13.	"Gotsta Go" (Part I) (Radio Edit) (featuring Da Brat)	Rowland; C. Bereal; K. Bereal; J. Bereal; Angela Beyincé; Shawntae Harris	CKB	3:48
Total length:				46:06

Ms. Kelly – International digital edition (bonus track)
No.	Title	Writer(s)	Producer(s)	Length
14.	"Dilemma" (with Nelly)	Haynes Jr.; Sigler; Gamble	BAM & Ryan	4:49
Total length:				50:55

Ms. Kelly – French edition (bonus tracks)
No.	Title	Writer(s)	Producer(s)	Length
14.	"H'Bibi I Love You" (with Amine)	Ahmed Hamadi; Natasha St-Pier	Kore	4:08
Total length:				50:14

Notes

- ^{^[a]} signifies a co-producer
- ^{^[b]} signifies an additional producer

== Re-releases ==
=== Diva Deluxe ===
Following the original album's lukewarm sales and reception, Rowland re-entered recording studios to collect new songs for a reissue of Ms. Kelly, including production by Stargate, Jeff Dawson, CKB and Mark Feist. She was also expected to record with producer Danja, but deadline pressure prevented from happening; a new track by J. R. Rotem did not make the final cut. "The sales weren't as good as I wanted them to be and to be honest, I did feel sad about that for a little while", Rowland stated in 2008, still blaming the final track listing for too many midtempos and ballads. "I didn't realize it while I was recording it. After it was released [back in June] many fans said the songs would rock if they were more upbeat." Branded with the title Ms. Kelly: Diva Deluxe, the United States re-release received a digital download release only on March 25, 2008, containing seven tracks—five new songs and two remixes of songs found from the standard edition of the album. Previously unreleased song "Daylight", a Bobby Womack cover and collaboration with Travie McCoy of Gym Class Heroes, served as the reissue's new lead single. The international edition of the Ms. Kelly re-release was released physically and digitally in May 2008, retitled as Ms. Kelly: Deluxe Edition. It removed seven tracks from the original release and replaced them with six of the seven Diva Deluxe tracks, an additional remix of "Daylight" by Joey Negro and the internationally successful Freemasons remix of "Work", as Rowland "wanted to have another view on the record and close the Ms. Kelly chapter" with the re-release.

=== Ms. Kelly Deluxe ===
Ms. Kelly – Deluxe edition
No.	Title	Writer(s)	Producer(s)	Length
1.	"Work" (Freemasons radio edit)	Rowland; Storch; Boyd	Storch; Pooh Bear^{[a]}; Freemasons^{[b]}	3:13
2.	"Daylight" (featuring Travie McCoy)	Harold Payne; Bobby Womack; Travie McCoy	S*A*M and Sluggo	3:30
3.	"Like This" (featuring Eve)	Rowland; Garrett; Jeffers; Jones; Perry; Williams	Polow da Don; Garrett^{[a]}; Perry^{[a]}; S-Dot^{[a]}; Elvis^{[a]}	3:39
4.	"Love"	Vynnytsky; Joseph; Knowles	Mysto & Pizzi; Knowles	3:51
5.	"This Is Love"	Mann	Mann	4:50
6.	"Broken"	Rowland; J. Bereal; Tim Blacksmith; Mikkel Eriksen; Tor Hermansen; P.T. Jackson	Stargate	3:24
7.	"Better Without You"	C. Bereal; K. Bereal; J. Bereal; Cofield	CKB	3:58
8.	"Every Thought Is You"	Rowland; Stinson; L. Dawson; J. Bereal; Mann; Nguyen; Buckines	L. Dawson; Rockwilder	3:56
9.	"Love Again"	J. Bereal; C. Bereal; R. Battle; C. Cofield; Cheyenne Jones; Phil Thornton	Battle Roy; Lonny Bereal^{[a]}	3:51
10.	"Unity"	Jordan Thorsteinson; Troy Samson; Mike James	Jeff Dawson	3:50
11.	"No Man No Cry"	Mark J. Feist; Damon Sharpe; Lauren Evans	Feist; Sharpe	3:28
12.	"Daylight" (Joey Negro Club Mix)	Payne; Womack; McCoy	S*A*M and Sluggo; Dave Lee^{[b]}	7:06
13.	"Comeback" (Karmatronic Remix)	Rowland; Storch; Boyd; Price	Storch; Pooh Bear^{[a]}; Achilles Sparta^{[b]}; Peter Krajezar^{[b]}	6:20
Total length:				54:57

Ms. Kelly – Digital deluxe edition (bonus tracks)
No.	Title	Writer(s)	Producer(s)	Length
14.	"Like This" (Karmatronics Radio Remix) (featuring Eve)	Rowland; Garrett; Jeffers; Jones; Perry; Williams	Polow da Don; Garrett^{[a]}; Perry^{[a]}; S-Dot^{[a]}; Elvis^{[a]}	3:19
15.	"Daylight" (Dan McKie Nightlight Dub Remix) (featuring Travie McCoy)	Payne; Womack; McCoy	Storch; Pooh Bear^{[a]}; Achilles Sparta^{[b]}; Peter Krajezar^{[b]}	5:42
Total length:				63:58

Ms. Kelly – Japanese deluxe edition (bonus tracks)
No.	Title	Writer(s)	Producer(s)	Length
14.	"Work" (Steve Pitron & Max Sanna Radio Edit)	Rowland; Storch; Boyd	Storch; Pooh Bear^{[a]}; Steve Pitron^{[b]}; Max Sanna^{[b]}	3:31
15.	"Daylight" (Karmatronic Remix)	Payne; Womack; McCoy	Storch; Pooh Bear^{[a]}; Achilles Sparta^{[b]}; Peter Krajezar^{[b]}	3:09
Total length:				61:37

=== BET Presents Kelly Rowland ===
Cover for BET Presents Kelly Rowland version of the album.

==== Background and release ====
On July 7, 2007, Columbia Records and BET released a joint DVD+CD version of the album called BET Presents Kelly Rowland. The DVD consists of a candid interview with Rowland as she talks about the production of Ms. Kelly, her time as a member of Destiny's Child, and her perspective on her celebrity status and solo career. The DVD also features BET highlights, performance highlights, and music videos from throughout Rowland's career.

"BET celebrates Kelly's highly-anticipated return by pairing her new CD with a bonus DVD like no other. Now, her biggest fans can experience her Black Carpet interview, five live performances and five timeless videos including one never before released in America anytime. Beyonce and Michelle even wish Ms. Kelly the best on the DVD."

The DVD was originally packaged with Rowland's second album, Ms. Kelly, exclusively at Walmart. However, it is now available for individual purchase at online shopping sites such as Amazon.com.

==== Track listing ====
BET Highlights

- Access Granted: The Making of Kelly Rowland
- Access Granted: "Stole"
- Black Carpet Interview with Toccara

Performance Highlights

- Hometown Church Performance
- Destiny's Child Performance "Say My Name" Live in Atlanta
- Glam-o-rama Minneapolis Performance
- Kelly Performs "Bad Habit" and "Dilemma" Live in Atlanta
- BET Awards 2005 Performance with Destiny's Child: "Cater 2 U"

Music Videos

- "Stole"
- "Dilemma"
- "Bad Habit"
- "Like This"
- "Train on a Track" (previously unreleased in the US)

== Credits and personnel ==
Credits adapted from the liner notes of Ms. Kelly.

- Kelly Rowland — vocals, executive producer, vocal producer
- Mathew Knowles — executive producer
- David Angell — violin
- Pamela Sixfin — violin
- Mary Kathryn Vanosdale — violin
- Craig Brockman — piano
- Christopher Farrell — viola
- Kristin Wilkinson — viola
- Anthony LaMarchina — cello
- Carl Marsh — conductor
- J. "Lonny" Bereal — vocal producer, vocal assistance
- Jason "Poo Bear" Boyd — vocal producer
- Montina Cooper — vocal producer, vocal assistance
- Huy Nguyen — vocal producer
- Wayne Allison — engineer
- Chris Jackson — engineer
- Colin Miller — engineer
- Brian Sumner — engineer
- Rommel Nino Villanueva — engineer
- Vadim Chislov — assistant engineer
- Gelly Kusuma — assistant engineer
- Kobla Tetey — assistant engineer
- Jason Goldstein — mixing
- Jean Marie Horvat — mixing
- Tony Maserati — mixing
- Dexter Simmons — mixing
- Phil Tan — mixing
- Andy Zulla — mixing
- Mike Fraser — mixing
- Christian Baker — mixing assistance
- Tom Coyne — mastering
- Chris Gehringer — mastering
- Fusako Chubachi — art direction
- Erwin Gorostiza — art direction

== Charts ==
=== Weekly charts ===
Weekly chart performance for Ms. Kelly
Chart (2007–08)	Peak position
Australian Albums (ARIA)	44
Australian Urban Albums (ARIA)	8
Belgian Albums (Ultratop Flanders)	76
Canadian Albums (Billboard)	64
Dutch Albums (Album Top 100)	61
European Top 100 Albums (Billboard) Deluxe edition	80
French Albums (SNEP)	88
German Albums (Offizielle Top 100)	80
Irish Albums (IRMA)	64
Italian Albums (FIMI)	41
Japanese Albums (Oricon)	26
Scottish Albums (Official Charts)	73
Scottish Albums (Official Charts) Deluxe edition	29
Swiss Albums (Schweizer Hitparade)	38
UK Albums (Official Charts)	37
UK Albums (Official Charts) Deluxe edition	23
UK R&B Albums (Official Charts)	9
UK R&B Albums (Official Charts) Deluxe edition	4
US Billboard 200	6
US Top R&B/Hip-Hop Albums (Billboard)	2

=== Year-end charts ===
2007 year-end chart performance for Ms. Kelly
Chart (2007)	Peak position
Australian Urban Albums (ARIA)	44
US Top R&B/Hip-Hop Albums (Billboard)	68

2008 year-end chart performance for Ms. Kelly
Chart (2008)	Peak position
Australian Urban Albums (ARIA)	44

== Release history ==
Release history and formats for Ms. Kelly
Region	Date	Edition(s)	Format(s)	Label(s)	Ref.
Japan	June 20, 2007	Standard	CD; digital download	Sony BMG	
Austria	June 22, 2007	Standard	CD; digital download	Sony BMG	
Denmark	June 22, 2007	Standard	CD; digital download	Sony BMG	
France	June 22, 2007	Standard	CD; digital download	Sony BMG	
Germany	June 22, 2007	Standard	CD; digital download	Sony BMG	
Switzerland	June 22, 2007	Standard	CD; digital download	Sony BMG	
Poland	June 25, 2007	Standard	CD; digital download	Sony BMG	
United Kingdom	June 25, 2007	Standard	CD; digital download	Sony BMG	
Canada	July 3, 2007	Standard	CD; digital download	Sony BMG	
New Zealand	July 3, 2007	Standard	CD; digital download	Sony BMG	
United States	July 3, 2007	Standard	CD; digital download	Columbia; Music World	
United States	July 3, 2007	Special Premium	CD; digital download	Columbia; Music World	
Australia	July 7, 2007	Standard	CD; digital download	Sony BMG	
United States	March 18, 2008	Diva Deluxe	Digital download (EP)	Columbia; Music World	
United Kingdom	March 25, 2008	Diva Deluxe	Digital download (EP)	Sony BMG	
United Kingdom	May 7, 2008	Deluxe	CD; digital download	Sony BMG	
Australia	May 27, 2008	Deluxe	CD; digital download	Sony BMG	
Germany	May 27, 2008	Deluxe	CD; digital download	Sony BMG	
Ireland	June 27, 2008	Digital Deluxe	Digital download (EP)	Sony BMG	
Japan	July 23, 2008	Deluxe	CD	Sony BMG	
Germany	September 22, 2008	Diva Deluxe	Digital download (EP)	Sony BMG	
