= Mysto and Pizzi =

American electronic music duo

Mysto & Pizzi
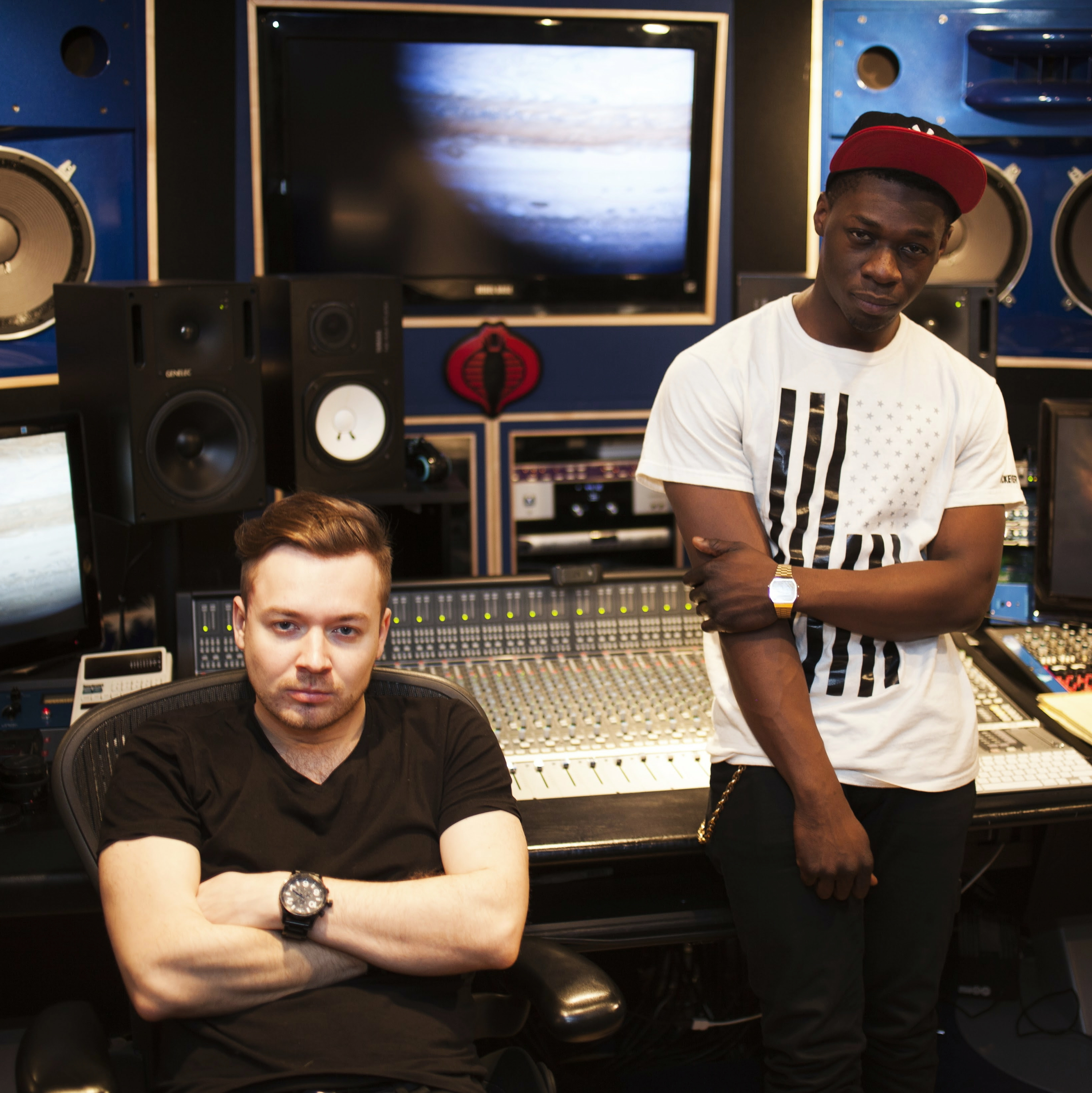
- Mysto & Pizzi in their studio in 2013

Background information
- Origin: Queens, NY
- Genres: Indie, pop, hip hop, R&B, electronic music
- Years active: 2006–present
- Label: Ultra Records
- Members: Yaroslav Vynnytsky; Marc Joseph
- Website: www.mystoandpizzi.com (defunct)

Yaroslav Vynnytsky and Marc Joseph, also known as Mysto & Pizzi, are American electronic music producers from Queens, NY. They are notable for their remix of the Rockwell/Michael Jackson song "Somebody's Watching Me" which was used as the theme for GEICO's "Kash" campaign. They also established a name for themselves through their YouTube channel which has over 50 million views. The duo have produced records for Kelly Rowland and R. Kelly as well as official remixes for acts such as Justin Timberlake, Tiësto, Kaskade, Avicii, Steve Aoki, EDX, and Adrian Lux.

== Music career ==
=== 2006–2010 ===
Mysto & Pizzi's extreme growth in June and July 2006.

Yaroslav Vynnytsky and Marc Joseph started working together in 2006 sharing a common interest in music production. Soon after, they started a YouTube channel showcasing their in-studio performances and documenting their life in the music industry. Their first production placement was on R. Kelly's "Double Up" Album titled "Get Dirty" featuring Chamillionaire. The album debuted at no.1 on the Billboard 200 earning the team their first platinum plaque. They followed up with their second production placement on Kelly Rowland's "Ms. Kelly" album with a track titled "Love". In 2009, Mysto and Pizzi produced a remix of the Rockwell/Michael Jackson song "Somebody's Watching Me" which was used as the theme music for GEICO's "Kash" campaign. In 2010, the R&B Group Brutha released their single "One Day on This Earth" which was a track produced by Mysto & Pizzi and written by R. Kelly. The record peaked at no.94 on the US R&B charts.

=== 2011–2015 ===
In 2011, Mysto & Pizzi came in at no.15 on the Next Big Sound chart after releasing music under their own imprint. They released 5 singles on Sony Music/Ultra Records including "Galax" and "Flight to Paris". They later released a track called "1UP" which was a Hip-Hop/Trap collaboration with American music producer Just Blaze. Wynter Gordon also collaborated with Mysto & Pizzi for her EP titled The Human Condition pt.1: Doleo. They produced 4 tracks on her project including "Nervous" featuring Travis Scott. In May 2014, Mysto & Pizzi developed their first indie-project with singer-songwriter Rachel Rabin called "RAIGN". Their first solo track titled "Don't Let Me Go", debuted on episode 110 of The Vampire Diaries. She performed the song on The X Factor shortly after, which led to the song peaking at No. 11 on the official UK indie breakers chart and no.38 on UK Alternative Charts.

=== Additional work ===
Mysto & Pizzi were invited to the TED (conference) in Brussels, Belgium to create a workshop showing kids between the ages of 11 and 13 the basic fundamentals of music production. They also collaborated with The American Cancer Society to create a viral campaign featuring Usher and Justin Bieber to help promote more birthdays.

== Discography ==
=== Singles ===
2011

- Where Is Love (Love Is Hard to Find) feat. Jonny Rose
- Hymn

2013

- Surrender feat, Derek Olds
- Galax

2014

- Flight to Paris
- 1UP with Just Blaze

== Production credits ==
List of songs as producer or co-producer, with performing artists and other credited writers, showing year released and album/EP name

Title	Year	Performing Artist(s)	Writers(s)	Album/EP
Ladies Night	2005	Nina Sky feat. Ivy Queen	Nina Sky, Ivy Queen	La Conexión
Get Dirty	2007	R. Kelly feat. Chamillionaire	R. Kelly, Chamillionaire	Double Up
Love	2007	Kelly Rowland	Solange Knowles	Ms.Kelly
One Day on This Earth	2010	Brutha	R. Kelly	Vacancy
Don't Let Me Go	2014	RAIGN	Rachel Rabin	Knockin' On Heavens Door EP
Wicked Games	2014	RAIGN	Rachel Rabin	Knockin' On Heavens Door EP
Empire of Our Own	2015	RAIGN	Rachel Rabin	Knockin' On Heavens Door EP
Knockin' on Heavens Door	2015	RAIGN	Rachel Rabin	Knockin' On Heavens Door EP

=== Remixes ===
2007

- Justin Timberlake – What Goes Around... Comes Around (Mysto & Pizzi remix)
- R. Kelly – I'm A Flirt (Mysto & Pizzi remix)

2010

- Avicii – Malo (Mysto & Pizzi remix)
- Tiësto – Knock You Out featuring Emily Haines (Mysto & Pizzi Remix)

2011

- Adrian Lux – feat. The Good Natured – Alive (Mysto & Pizzi remix)
- DJ Antoine – This Time (Mysto & Pizzi remix)
- Cedric Gervais ft. Mya – Love Is The Answer (Mysto & Pizzi remix)

2012

- Matchbox Twenty – She's so mean (Mysto & Pizzi remix)
- EDX feat. John Williams – Give It Up for Love (Mysto & Pizzi remix)
- Steve Aoki – Kudi the Kid (Mysto & Pizzi remix)
- Kaskade feat. Skylar Grey – Room for Happiness (Mysto & Pizzi remix)
- Rebecca & Fiona Hard – (Mysto & Pizzi Remix)

2016

- MKTO – Hands off My Heart – (Mysto & Pizzi remix)

2020

- Matti Charlton - I Can't Find You - (Pizzi's Initial Mix)
