= Daylight (Bobby Womack song) =

1976 single by Bobby Womack

Single by Bobby Womack

from the album Safety Zone
- B-side: "Trust Me" (7")
- Released: January 1976 (7")
- Recorded: 1975
- Studio: Wally Heider Recording Studios
- Genre: R&B; soul
- Length: 3:15 (7"); 3:29 (12")
- Label: United Artists
- Songwriters: Bobby Womack; Harold Payne
- Producer: David Rubinson

Bobby Womack singles chronology
"It's All Over Now" (1975)	"Daylight" (1976)	"Where There's a Will, There's a Way" (1976)

Audio video
- "Daylight" on YouTube

"Daylight" is a R&B song recorded by American recording artist Bobby Womack for his 1975 album Safety Zone. Written by Womack with lyricist Harold Payne, it was issued as a single and reached No. 5 on Billboard's Hot Soul Singles chart in the spring of 1976.

== Background ==
Harold Payne would recall that his brother Larry Payne met up with Womack when the latter was in San Francisco to record the Safety Zone album: Larry Payne ran the pop culture magazine Where It's At which had recently profiled Womack who was resultantly receptive when Larry Payne recommended the singer meet with Larry Payne's aspiring songwriter brother Harold Payne. After receiving a call from Larry Payne, Harold Payne flew from Los Angeles to San Francisco and met with Womack at the Wally Heider Recording Studios where after hashing over musical ideas with Harold Payne, Womack devised a rhythm track: Harold Payne then completed the lyric for "Daylight" at his home in Los Angeles which he describes as "a notorious party house" - "the lyric took on the story of what went on at the house and it meshed well with what Bobby had in mind." Produced by David Rubinson - with Wah Wah Watson as associate producer - "Daylight" featured background vocals by the Pointer Sisters. "Daylight" inaugurated a long songwriting collaboration between Bobby Womack and Harold Payne which extended to Womack's final album: The Bravest Man in the Universe (2012).

== Personnel and credits ==
- Mark Davis – arranger
- Harold Payne – writer
- David Rubinson – producer
- Wah Wah Watson – associate producer
- Bobby Womack – lead vocalist, writer

== Charts ==
Weekly chart performance for "Daylight"
Chart (1976)	Peak position
US Hot R&B/Hip-Hop Songs (Billboard)	5

== Kelly Rowland version ==
"Daylight"

Single by Kelly Rowland featuring Travis McCoy

from the album Ms. Kelly (deluxe edition) and Ms. Kelly: Diva Deluxe
- Released: January 22, 2008
- Recorded: October 2007
- Studio: Undisclosed studio (London); Fresh Kills (New York City)
- Genre: R&B; hip hop soul
- Length: 3:33
- Label: Columbia; Music World
- Songwriters: Bobby Womack; Harold Payne; Travis McCoy
- Producer: S*A*M & Sluggo

Kelly Rowland singles chronology
"Work" (2008)	"Daylight" (2008)	"No Future in the Past" (2008)

Travis McCoy singles chronology
"Snakes on a Plane (Bring It)" (2006)	"Daylight" (2008)	"Coconut Juice" (2008)

Music video
- "Daylight" on YouTube

In 2007, the song was covered by American singer Kelly Rowland along with a rap by Travis McCoy, front man of the indie hip-hop band Gym Class Heroes, for the soundtrack of French comedy film Asterix at the Olympic Games (2008). The cover was produced by S*A*M & Sluggo.

=== Recording and production ===
Rowland recorded "Daylight" circa October 2007 in London, while she was promoting Ms. Kelly in the United Kingdom. Although she "had a great time recording it", she was nervous about meeting with McCoy in the studio: "When we got into the studio it was just magic together and I'm happy that it was because you always wonder how a collaboration is going to come out", she said. Stating her reasons for choosing to work with McCoy, she told British songwriter Pete Lewis of Blues & Soul: "I love the fact that Gym Class Heroes' music and sound is something different and eclectic. I figured me and Travis together would be an unusual type a duo. And I'm really happy I trusted my instincts. Because it turned out to be a really cool, different type of collaboration. To me Travis is like a rapper-slash-poet-slash-rocker, and our combination really worked!".

Initially recorded solely for the soundtrack for Asterix at the Olympic Games, Rowland was so satisfied with the track, she wanted to include it on her extended play (EP) Ms. Kelly: Diva Deluxe (2008) and release it as a single as well: "I love doing collaborations – it's always good to do something that's out the box." She also stated the cover was her favorite addition to Ms. Kelly: Diva Deluxe; the cover was also added to the deluxe edition of Ms. Kelly soon after, along with other tracks from the EP.

=== Music video ===
A music video for "Daylight" was filmed in November 2007, and was directed by Jeremy Rall. Produced by Gina Leonard for Siblings Inc., it was shot in New York City, ten blocks from the Empire State Building. The visuals show Rowland among a bunch of people in a party inside an apartment building alongside Travis McCoy. The video begins at 5:00 a.m. while the party is still in full swing; when the sun begins to rise and shines through the windows, the party-goers move up to the roof of the building to continue the party. About shooting, Rowland said: "Shooting the music video for the song was hilarious, with Travis especially. He looked so funny and cute when he was riding a weird modified-bicycle in the middle of the bustling city." The other members of Gym Class Heroes made cameos in the video.

A seven-second snippet of the video premiered on NBC's Clash of the Choirs. The full video finally premiered on Vivement Dimanche in France on January 6, 2008, including clips from the Asterix at the Olympic Games film. In the United States, the video premiered via MySpace on January 17, excluding the Asterix at the Olympic Games clips; the same day, it also premiered on BET's 106 & Park as the "New Joint" of the day. In the United Kingdom, the video premiered via music channel Bubble Hits on March 19.

=== Commercial performance ===
"Daylight" debuted at number 36 on the UK Singles Chart, based solely on digital downloads. Upon its physical release on May 5, 2008, the song climbed 22 places to number 14, being the largest climber within the UK Singles Chart's top 40 that week. The song became Rowland's eighth consecutive top-20 hit in the country, although it was not as successful as the first two singles from Ms. Kelly–"Like This" and "Work", both of which peaked within the top five.

=== Track listings ===
US digital remix EP

1. "Daylight" (Hex Hector Remix) – 8:30
2. "Daylight" (Maurice Joshua Nu Soul Remix) – 5:27
3. "Daylight" (Karmatronic Remix) – 6:58
4. "Daylight" (Loze Daze Remix) – 6:11
5. "Daylight" (Dan McKie Nightlight Dub Mix) – 5:41

US digital download

1. "Daylight" (album version) – 3:34

UK CD single

1. "Daylight" (album version) – 3:33
2. "Daylight" (Joey Negro Radio Edit) – 3:29

=== Charts ===
Weekly chart performance for "Daylight"
Chart (2008)	Peak position
Australia (ARIA)	43
CIS Airplay (TopHit)	125
European Hot 100 Singles (Billboard)	44
Global Dance Songs (Billboard)	29
Hungary (Editors' Choice Top 40)	38
Ireland (IRMA)	43
Japan Hot 100 (Billboard)	41
Netherlands (Dutch Top 40 Tipparade)	15
Romania (Romanian Top 100)	91
Scotland Singles (OCC)	13
UK Singles (OCC)	14
UK Hip Hop/R&B (OCC)	5
US Dance Club Songs (Billboard)	4

=== Release history ===
Release dates and formats for "Daylight"
Region	Date	Version(s)	Format(s)	Label(s)	Ref.
United States	January 22, 2008	Original	Contemporary hit radio	Columbia; Music World	
United States	March 11, 2008	Remixes	Digital download (EP)	Columbia; Music World	
United Kingdom	April 18, 2008	Radio edit	Digital download	RCA	
India	April 29, 2008	Original	Digital download	Sony BMG	
United Kingdom	April 29, 2008	Remixes	Digital download (EP)	RCA	
United Kingdom	May 2, 2008	Hex Hector remix	Digital download	RCA	
United Kingdom	May 5, 2008	Original	CD	RCA	
Australia	June 28, 2008	Original	Digital download	Sony BMG	
Australia	June 30, 2008	Original	CD	Sony BMG	
Germany	August 1, 2008	Original	CD	Sony BMG	

== Other versions ==
"Daylight" was recorded by Vicki Sue Robinson for her self-titled 1976 album release from which it was issued as lead single reaching No. 63 on the Billboard Hot 100 (#91 R&B). The song has also been recorded by Leon Russell and Mary Russell (album Wedding Album - the track was produced by Bobby Womack), and also by Black Slate (album Midnight/ 2013). Candy Dulfer performs the song with Chance Howard (vocals) during her concerts when the two are together. In 2018 the Fun Lovin' Criminals released their own version, which differs very much from the original, such as new lyrics.
