= Brutha (album) =

Studio album by Brutha
- Released: December 21, 2008
- Length: 38:36
- Label: Def Jam
- Producer: Eric Crawford; Blac Elvis; Jermaine Dupri; Chuck Harmony; Heavyweights; Daron Jones; Dwayne Nesmith; Jazze Pha; Soundz; Shea Taylor; Curtis "Sauce" Wilson

Brutha chronology
Brutha (2008)	Vacancy (2010)

Singles from Brutha
- 1. "I Can't Hear the Music" Released: September 23, 2008; 2. "She's Gone (It's To Late)" Released: March 21, 2009

Brutha is the debut studio album by American R&B group Brutha, released on December 21, 2008, by Def Jam Recordings. It peaked at number 81 on the US Billboard 200 and number 15 on the Top R&B/Hip-Hop Albums chart and remains the group's only full-length project to be released. Brutha was supported by one single, "I Can't Hear The Music" featuring rapper Fabolous.

== Critical reception ==
Professional ratings
Review scores
Source	Rating
DJBooth.net	3/5 stars

AllMusic wrote that Brutha's "self-titled debut album shows them to be adept at conjuring up romantic moods atop arrangements that neatly avoid the usual slow-jam cliches." DJBooth.net noted that Brutha was "punctuated by club ready tracks like "Can't Hear" and the Ne-Yo-esque "What If," but the bulk of the album is filled with mid-tempo crooning about love sought after and lost. In fact, the true measure of a black male R&B group is how hotly they inspire sweet love-making [...] and on that count Brutha comes out somewhere in between Day26 and Jagged Edge."

== Track listing ==
Brutha track listing
No.	Title	Producer(s)	Length
1.	"Bang Bang"	Chuck Harmony; Curtis "Sauce" Wilson; Ne-Yo^{[a]}	3:58
2.	"I Can't Hear the Music" (featuring Fabolous)	Blac Elvis; Eric Crawford	4:22
3.	"She's Gone"	Dwayne Nesmith	4:23
4.	"Set It Off"	Heavyweights; Ne-Yo^{[a]}	4:21
5.	"Like This"	Daron Jones	3:49
6.	"Afraid of Love"	Blac Elvis; Crawford	3:32
7.	"Ghost"	Soundz	3:11
8.	"What If"	Nesmith	3:58
9.	"Just Being Honest"	Shea Taylor	3:18
10.	"Make You Love It"	Jazze Pha	3:49

Notes

- ^{^[a]} denotes additional producer(s)

== Charts ==
=== Weekly charts ===
Weekly chart performance for Brutha
Chart (2008–09)	Peak position
US Billboard 200	81
US Top R&B/Hip-Hop Albums (Billboard)	15

=== Year-end charts ===
Year-end chart performance for Brutha
Chart (2009)	Position
US Top R&B/Hip-Hop Albums (Billboard)	86
