= Brothers to Brutha =

American reality television series

Brothers to Brutha is an American reality show on BET that was premiered on November 18, 2008. It follows five brothers who have a record deal on Island Def Jam Music Group as the R&B group Brutha. It was shown on Tuesday nights at 10:30pm. The first season consisted of six episodes. A second season has been confirmed by Brutha on YouTube. The group released their first album, Brutha, on December 23, 2008.

The show received mixed reviews, with the Boston Herald saying "it is downright painful to watch shot after shot of these young men staring forlornly at the floor after yet another family altercation" and the Detroit News saying that it "is a diamond-in-the-rough type of show that's full of potential". In a positive review, David Hinckley of the New York Daily News wrote, "Based on the first few episodes, they already have a better-than-average TV show, playing more like a running documentary than your standard-issue 'reality' project."

== Episodes ==
The series began on November 18, 2008, and concluded on December 23, 2008.

1. "Under One Roof"
2. "What Happened in Vegas?"
3. "Sister of Mine"
4. "A Brother's Love"
5. "Just Like Rockstars!"
6. "Brutha's Single"

== Brothers ==
- Grady Harrell III - eldest brother
- Anthony Harrell - second brother, lead singer
- Jared Overton - third brother
- Cheyenne Harrell - fourth brother, lead singer
- Jacob Harrell - youngest brother
