= RAIGN =

Raign
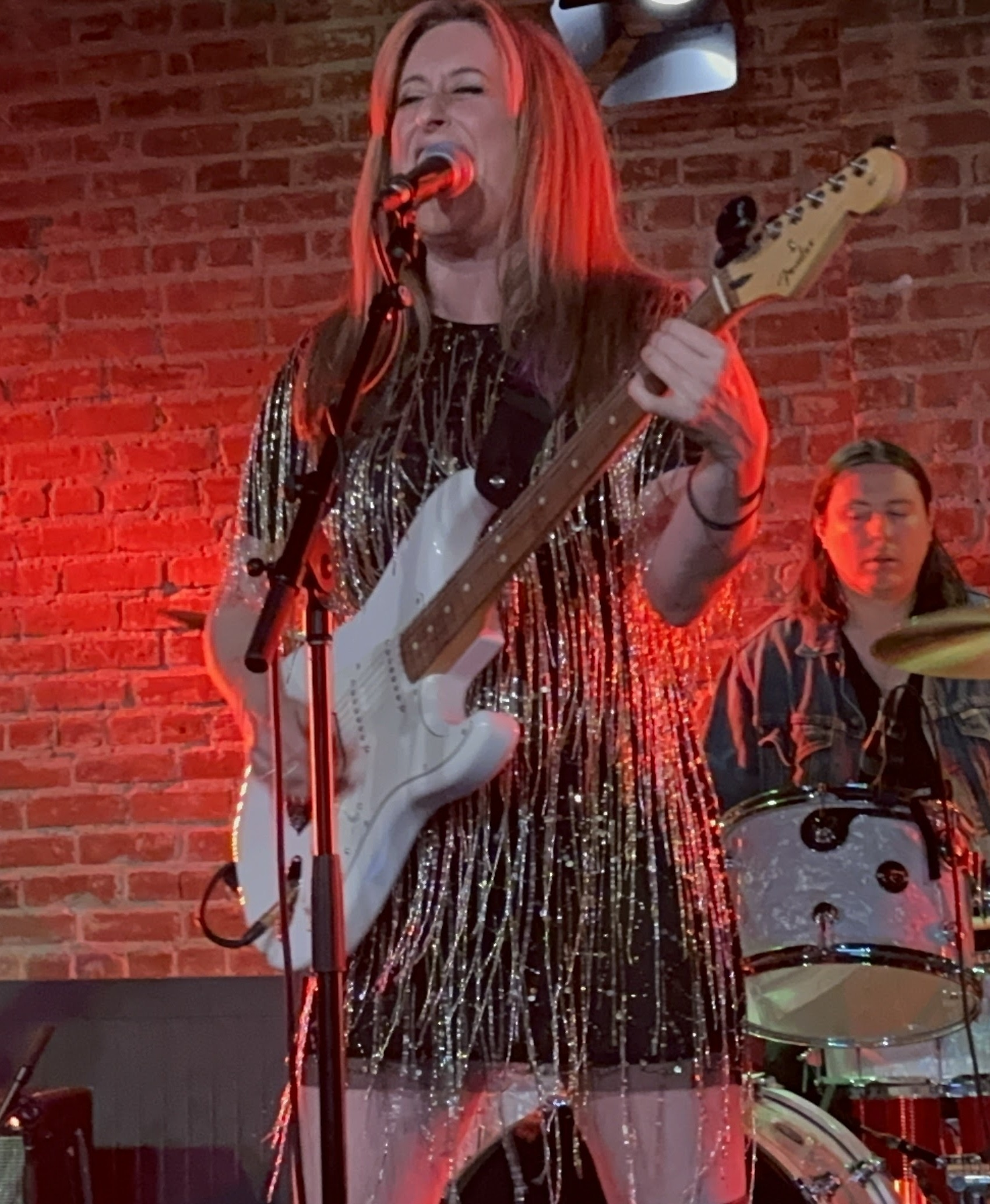
- RAIGN Performing at the Venice West in Los Angeles in 2024.

Background information
- Also known as: RAIGN
- Born: Rachel Sarah Rabin
- Origin: London, England
- Genres: Pop, alternative rock, cinematic music, progressive house
- Occupations: Singer; songwriter; record producer; film score composer; vocal producer
- Years active: 2012–present
- Labels: Millionaire London Records, Sony ATV, Dim Mak Records
- Website: IamRAIGN.com

Rachel Sarah Rabin, also known by her stagename Raign (stylised as RAIGN), is an English singer-songwriter and record producer. Her songs have been featured on the soundtracks of TV series, films and trailers, including The Vampire Diaries, The 100, The Shannara Chronicles, and Legacies, The Morning Show, Paradise, The Hunger Games: The Ballad of Songbirds & Snakes, as well as official trailers for Younger and the video games SnowRunner and Tekken 7. Early in her career, she co-wrote several singles for albums by Rita Ora, Jesse McCartney, and Tulisa, and in 2014 she was featured as a vocalist on the track "Fix Me" by Swanky Tunes. Released on Dim Mak Records, the song spent two months at No. 1 on the Russian airplay chart.

In May 2014 her first solo track as RAIGN, titled "Don't Let Me Go", debuted on episode 110 of The Vampire Diaries. She performed the song on The X Factor shortly after, which led to the song peaking at No. 11 on the official UK Indie Breakers Chart and No. 38 on the UK Alternative Chart.

In March 2015, RAIGN’s third single, ‘Knocking on Heavens Door’, from her debut EP of the same title, was featured in the TV series The 100 and reached No. 116 on the US iTunes pop charts. Its use in the series was voted Best Use of Music in a TV Finale by audiences in the Entertainment Weekly Awards.

In September 2018, she released her debut album SIGN, preceded by the singles "Out of Time" and "Who Are You", which explore influences from classic rock, pop, and orchestral movements in a "culmination of creative passion". In 2020 she released a deluxe version of the album, retitled SIGN From Above and has released a live album titled RAIGN, Live at the Village Studios, Los Angeles in June 2024.

== Early life and education ==
Rachel Rabin was born in London, England, where she also spent her childhood. She attended Tolworth Girls' School in Surrey. She is of Latvian and Jewish ancestry. Her grandfather was Oscar Rabin, musician known for founding the Oscar Rabin Band. Her father also had a musical background, and had worked with Frank Sinatra. Rabin said in an interview that she grew up listening to big band music and that, when she first decided to learn an instrument, she chose the clarinet and learned to play blues and jazz. She said that her mother was a semi-professional opera singer whose singing she tried to emulate. Her grandfather, who died when she was young, had been a survivor of the Holocaust.

== Music career ==
=== Early songwriting and producing (2010–2013) ===
Working as a vocalist and songwriter, in 2009 she self-released a demo in the UK under her full name. By 2010, she was performing original music with a mix of blues, folk, and pop in the Kingston area, at venues such as the Bull's Head. She played her first show in the United States at the Viper Room in Los Angeles, where she performed a one-hour acoustic set with an accompanying guitarist. Also in the early 2010s she played festivals and venues in Leicester, and in 2011 she performed at the Mint in Los Angeles, which lead to a publishing deal with EMI Music publishing.

As well as writing for her own albums, Rabin co-wrote with many recording artists and DJs in Los Angeles at this time, including, Swanky Tunes, Ty Dolla $ign and Rita Ora. Rabin co-wrote and vocal produced the track "Been Lyin", released on the album "Ora", which debuted at number 1 on the UK Albums Chart in August 2012.

In 2013, she released a single under the name Rachel Rabin, "Raise the Dead", which premiered in season one of The Originals.

=== Early singles and debut EP (2014–2015) ===
In May 2014, RAIGN released her first solo single as RAIGN, titled "Don't Let Me Go",[3] which debuted on episode 110 of The Vampire Diaries. Her second solo single as RAIGN, a cover of "Wicked Game" by Chris Isaak, was released on 7 October 2014 as an electropop number. The New York-based electronic duo Mysto & Pizzi mixed the song. At that point Mysto & Pizzi, were helping produce much of her work. In February 2015, her original track "Empire of Our Own" was included on an episode of The 100.

She released the EP Knocking on Heavens Door in March 2015, which included three of her previous tracks and the new song "Knocking on Heaven's Door." Her cover of "Knocking on Heavens Door" was included on the soundtrack of the finale to season 2 finale of The 100 in March 2015. In its first week of release the lead single reached No. 116 on the US iTunes pop charts. In 2015, the use of "Knocking on Heavens Door" in The 100 was voted Best Use of Music by audiences in the Entertainment Weekly TV Season Finale Awards.

=== When It's All Over EP (2016–2017) ===
On 31 March 2016 Raign announced that her second EP When It's All Over would be released on 14 April 2016 and the lead single would premiere on The Vampire Diaries on 1 April. The EP also included an acoustic version of Don’t Let Me Go, which was featured on season 7 of American TV show Pretty Little Liars and the official trailer for the video game Snowrunner. Later that year she co-wrote and performed vocals on "Dark Lights", a single by UK Drum ‘n’ Bass DJ Dimension, which was played heavily on BBC Radio 1.

=== Born Again EP (2018) ===
On January 19, 2018, RAIGN announced via social media that her third EP Born Again would be released on January 26 via Millionaire London Records and would feature four new songs produced with film soundtracks in mind, including an orchestral remake of "One Thing Leads to Another", originally recorded by the Fixx and an orchestral mix of "Empire Of Our Own".

=== "Out of Time" (2018) ===
Her single "Out of Time" was released on 10 August 2018 and premiered in Clash magazine. It was released as the lead single for her upcoming studio album. RAIGN said that the song was about "having a feeling inside that you can do something magical, but you have to move fast or the magic moment will go and if you don't do it now, you'll always regret it. Personal alchemy."

=== Debut album SIGN and other singles (2018–2019) ===
RAIGN's debut full-length album SIGN was released on September 6, 2018, and two singles were released "Who Are You" and "Now I Can Fly", which premiered on the TV shows Legacies and Grey's Anatomy and on the trailer for the Netflix original movie Tall Girl. The album features orchestral tracks with, "dark, bass synth" as well as songs influenced by electronic Dance music and includes the track "to Heaven Alone", written with French house DJ Fred Faulke. Gig Soup described the album as "Pop romanticism". Rabin said that SIGN represented "a life’s work coming together", with the songs having been written over the course of five years. She described the album's lyrics as sometimes having "multiple meanings". RAIGN co-produced many of the tracks along with British record producer, Robbie Lamond, and decided to record the tracks "the old-fashioned way," recording musicians live in a studio. In June 2019, Rabin announced via social media the release of her next single, "Walls".

=== SIGN From Above and later releases (2020–2023) ===
In 2020, RAIGN released SIGN From Above, a 21-track deluxe version of her debut. Released through Millionaire London Records, the album included her previously released singles "Now I Can Fly" and "Walls" along with the track "Causing Love". Later that year RAIGN released her first christmas single, "Christmas (Baby Please Come Home)".

In 2022, RAIGN released the single "Spaceman", a cover of the 1996 song by Babylon Zoo. In 2023, she released the Neo-Classical single "Please (My God)", which premiered in the first season of The Morning Show on Apple TV. That year, she also collaborated with BBC Radio1 DJ René LaVice on the Drum ‘n’ Bass single "Fall From The Dark" and performed with her band at the Venice West in Los Angeles in July. Her 2016 single "When It's All Over" was also remixed by Ralphie B and Frank Waanders and released on Black Hole Recordings in 2023.

=== RAIGN, Live at The Village Studios EP and recent works (2024–present) ===
In June 2024, Rabin's song "Empire of Our Own (Orchestral Version)", from her EP Born Again, was used in promotional material for The Hunger Games: The Ballad of Songbirds & Snakes. Later that month, she released the live EP RAIGN (Live at The Village Studios, Los Angeles, 2024 which was recorded with a twelve piece orchestra and included six orchestral versions of six of her most well known singles from Film and TV soundtracks, all performed live.

In February 2025, RAIGN’s 2015 track "Knocking on Heaven’s Door" was featured in the penultimate episode of the first season of Paradise. Later that year she released "Back to Life", a cover of the Soul II Soul song, which was featured in the British television programme Celebrity Traitors.

== Style and influences ==
Rabin has self-described the style of her material as "pop romanticism," and modern influences on her music include acts such as Florence + the Machine, Amy Winehouse, Oasis and No Doubt. Exploring this idea of pop as an arena for re-invention, and using digital pop music as a means to express magic, Rabin's fascination with the spectacular seeps into every note of her music. Rabin also cites influences from "early exposure to orchestral/film music, blues, and classic rock". In her teen years, she was exposed to electronic dance music with back-beats and half-time beats. She explored the band scene in psychedelic rock and found inspiration from artists such as Pink Floyd, including their record The Dark Side of the Moon, and also local London bands. She also experimented with grooves and tempos from Drum ‘n’ Bass and U.K. Garage styles.

== Personal life ==
As of 2014, Rabin continued to live in both Kingston upon Thames in southwest London and Los Angeles, where her grandmother lives.

== Discography ==
=== Extended plays ===
| Album title | Album details | Peak chart positions |
| Album title | Album details | US iTunes Pop |
|---|---|---|
| Knocking On Heaven's Door | Release date: 12 March 2015; Label: Millionaire London Records; Formats: Digital download | 116 |
| When It's All Over | Release date: 15 April 2016; Label: Millionaire London Records; Formats: Digital download | _ |
| Born Again | Release date 26 January 2018; Label Millionaire London Records; Format: Digital download | _ |
| RAIGN (Live at The Village Studios, Los Angeles, 2024) | Release date: 14 June 2024; Label: Millionaire London Records; Formats: Digital download, streaming media | _ |

=== Albums ===
| Album title | Album details | Peak chart positions |
| Album title | Album details | US iTunes Pop |
|---|---|---|
| SIGN | Release date 6 September 2018; Label Millionaire London Records; Format: Digital download | _ |
| SIGN From Above | Release date: 2020; Label: Millionaire London Records; Formats: Digital download | – |

=== Singles ===
| Year | Single | Peak chart position | | Album/EP |
| Year | Single | UK Indie Br | UK Alt | Album/EP |
|---|---|---|---|---|
| 2013 | "Raise the Dead" | – | – | Non-album single |
| 2014 | "A Queen's Head" | – | – | Non-album single |
| 2014 | "Don't Let Me Go" | 11 | 38 | Knocking on Heaven's Door |
| 2014 | "Wicked Game" | – | – | Knocking on Heaven's Door |
| 2015 | "Empire of Our Own" | – | – | Knocking on Heaven's Door |
| 2015 | "Knockin' on Heaven's Door" | – | – | Knocking on Heaven's Door |
| 2015 | "Strong Enough" ft. J'khai | – | – | Strong Enough |
| 2016 | "When It's All Over" | – | – | When It's All Over |
| 2016 | "Believe With Me" | – | – | Believe With Me |
| 2016 | "One Thing Leads to Another" | – | – | Born Again |
| 2018 | "Out of Time" | – | – | SIGN |
| 2018 | "Who Are You" | – | – | SIGN |
| 2019 | "Now I Can Fly" | – | – | SIGN From Above |
| 2019 | "Walls" | – | – | SIGN |
| 2020 | "Causing Love" | – | – | SIGN From Above |
| 2020 | "Christmas (Baby Please Come Home)" | – | – | Non-album single |
| 2022 | "Spaceman" | – | – | Non-album single |
| 2023 | "Please (My God)" | – | – | Non-album single |
| 2025 | "Back to Life" | – | – | Non-album single |

=== Guest appearances ===
| Year | Single name | Primary artist(s) | Album | Details |
|---|---|---|---|---|
| 2014 | "Fix Me" (ft. Raign) | Swanky Tunes | The Only Way Is Essex – Dance Anthems | Dim Mak Records (DM614) |
| 2015 | "Dark Lights" (ft. Raign) uncredited | Dimension | | MTA Records MTA073A |
| 2015 | "One World" (ft. Raign) | Swanky Tunes & Dropgun | Swanky Tunes & Dropgun ft. Raign - One World | Armada Music |
| 2016 | "On Fire" (ft. Raign) | Popeska | Single | Proximity Release |
| 2023 | "Fall From The Dark" | René LaVice & RAIGN | Single | – |

=== Media Usage ===
List of RAIGN songs featured on various productions
| Year | Song | Where | Type |
|---|---|---|---|
| 2012 | "Goodbye" | Desperate Housewives | Television |
| 2013 | "Raise The Dead" | The Originals (TV series) | Television |
| 2014 | "Don't Let Me Go" | The Vampire Diaries | Television |
| 2014 | "Make This House A Home" | Annie (2014 film) | Movie |
| 2015 | "Raise The Dead" | Eye Candy (TV series) | Television |
| 2015 | "Empire of Our Own" | The 100 (TV series) | Television |
| 2015 | "Knockin' on Heaven's Door" | The 100 (TV series) | Television |
| 2016 | "When It's All Over" | The Vampire Diaries | Television |
| 2016 | "Knockin' on Heaven's Door" | Containment (TV series) | Television |
| 2016 | "Strong Enough" | The Biggest Loser (Australian TV series) | Television |
| 2016 | "Wicked Game" | America's Got Talent | Television |
| 2016 | "Shine" | The Arrangement (2017 TV series) | Television |
| 2017 | "When It's All Over" | The Shannara Chronicles | Television |
| 2017 | "Don't Let Me Go (Acoustic)" | Pretty Little Liars | Television |
| 2017 | "Strong Enough" | Tekken 7 | Online Promo |
| 2017 | "Wicked Game" | America's Got Talent | Television |
| 2017 | "Wicked Game" | World of Dance (TV series) | Television |
| 2018 | "Don't Let Me Go" | Hollyoaks | Television |
| 2018 | "Who Are You" | Legacies (TV series) | Television |
| 2019 | "Now I Can Fly" | Grey's Anatomy | Television |
| 2019 | "Now I Can Fly" | Tall Girl | Movie trailer |
| 2023 | "Please (My God)" | The Morning Show (TV series) | Television |
| 2023 | "Knockin' on Heaven's Door" | The Blacklist | Television |
| 2024 | "Empire of Our Own (Orchestral Version)" | The Hunger Games: The Ballad of Songbirds & Snakes | Promotional material |
| 2025 | "Knockin' on Heaven's Door" | Paradise (2025 TV series) | Television |
| 2025 | "Back to Life" | Celebrity Traitors | Television |

== Selected songwriting and recording credits ==
| Year | Title | Artist | Songwriter(s) | Album/EP |
|---|---|---|---|---|
| 2012 | "Goodbye" | RAIGN (as Rachel Rabin) | Rachel Rabin | |
| 2012 | "Been Lying" | Rita Ora | Rita Ora Rachel Rabin (also vocal producer) Edwin Serrano Michael Linney Brandon Linney | Ora |
| 2012 | "Steal My Breath Away" | Tulisa | Tulisa Contostavlos Toby Gad Rachel Rabin (also vocal producer) Tyrone Griffin Max Gousse | The Female Boss |
| 2012 | "Time" | Ty Dollar $ign | Tyrone Griffin Rachel Rabin | Beachhouse Mixtape |
| 2012 | "Mi$$ion" | Ty Dollar $ign | Tyrone Griffin Rachel Rabin | Beachhouse Mixtape |
| 2012 | "Infatuated" | Ty Dollar $ign | Tyrone Griffin Rachel Rabin | Beachhouse Mixtape |
| 2013 | "Raise the Dead" | RAIGN (as Rachel Rabin) | Rachel Rabin | |
| 2014 | "A Queen's Head" | RAIGN | Rachel Rabin David Jurgens | |
| 2014 | "Don't Let Me Go" | RAIGN | Rachel Rabin Mysto & Pizzi | Knocking On Heaven's Door |
| 2014 | "Empire of Our Own" | RAIGN | Rachel Rabin Mysto & Pizzi | Knocking On Heaven's Door |
| 2014 | "The Other Guy" | Jesse McCartney | Jesse McCartney James G. Morales Matt Morales Julio David Rodriguez Rachel Rabin Lazonate Franklin Sherry Goffin Kondor | In Technicolor |
| 2017 | “Young and Free” | Will Sparks and Priyanka Chopra | Rachel Rabin Tyrone Griffin (Ty Dolla Sign) Toby Gad Pryanka Chopra Will Sparks | |
