= Ghetto (Kelly Rowland song) =

Single by Kelly Rowland featuring Snoop Dogg

from the album Ms. Kelly
- Released: August 7, 2007
- Studio: Hit Factory Criteria (Miami, Florida)
- Genre: Crunk&B
- Length: 2:55
- Label: Columbia; Music World
- Songwriters: Durrell Babbs; Lonny Bereal; Calvin Broadus; Kelly Rowland
- Producer: Tank

Kelly Rowland singles chronology
"Like This" (2007)	"Ghetto" (2007)	"Work" (2008)

Snoop Dogg singles chronology
"Speaker" (2007)	"Ghetto" (2007)	"Sensual Seduction" (2007)

"Ghetto" is a song by American recording artist Kelly Rowland, featuring vocals by rapper Snoop Dogg. It was written by Durrell "Tank" Babbs, Calvin Broadus, Lonny Bereal and Rowland, and produced by the former for Rowland's second solo album Ms. Kelly (2007). A mid-paced R&B ballad which was originally recorded for her shelved My Story album, "Ghetto" is influenced by the Crunk&B subgenre. Its instrumentation consists essentially of synthesizers and a drum machine rhythm and lyrically, finds Rowland, as the protagonist, singing sensually in her whistle register about becoming attracted to dangerous men.

One of Rowland's favorites on Ms. Kelly, "Ghetto" was released as the album's second single to US radios on August 7, 2007, while "Work" was serviced as the album's second international single. The song performed weakly on the Billboard charts, reaching number nine on the Bubbling Under R&B/Hip-Hop Singles chart only, ranking it among Rowland's lowest-selling single to date. An accompanying music video, directed by Andrew Gura, was shot in Los Angeles, California in August 2007. It features cameo appearances from rappers MC Eiht, Kam, and Soopafly and depicts hip hop fashion and ghetto fabulous aesthetics.

== Recording ==
The song is one out of two recordings singer and songwriter Tank and Joseph "Lonny" Bereal produced for the album. One of her favorites on the album, Rowland has described "Ghetto" as "about good girls who dig bad boys," adding: "As soon as Tank played it, I knew and recorded it in an hour. [It] is just so laid back and that's why I had to have Snoop [Dogg]." Originally recorded without Snoop Dogg for the delayed 2006 My Story album, it was not until months prior to the Ms. Kelly release, that the rapper was consulted to contribute additional vocals to the track. "He's the King of Cool, so I was honoured when he said yes to do the record. It was like a dream come true," Rowland stated in an interview with Blue & Soul in 2007. "He [just] put his Snoop-a-fied player-isms on the track [...] He just gives it that something. I like it when a song can make you feel good."

== Critical reception ==
"Ghetto" earned generally mixed reviews from contemporary music critics. Sal Cinquemani from Slant felt that "Rowland displays her range on midtempo cut [...] “Ghetto,” a slinky track featuring a smooth, sensual vocal from the singer." Spence D. of media website IGN observed that "the high pitched nuances [on Ms. Kelly] continue on "Ghetto," featuring the ubiquitous Snoop Dogg. Rowland adopts a wispy timbre that is sensual in a fleeting way, but the track is again amped up with too much high end sound, making it more cloying than immersive." San Francisco Chronicle remarked that "Ghetto" has "Rowland exploring the increasingly common theme of a good girl falling for a bad boy. Her cotton-candy mezzo tones are easy to digest." Mark Edward Nero from About.com found that "Ghetto" was the worst of the "many weak songs" on Ms. Kelly, concluding that "it's laugh-out-loud ridiculous, particularly with Kelly singing contrived, out-of-character lines." CBS News called the song "sexy and seductive"

== Commercial performance ==
Released in North America only, "Ghetto" went for radio ads in August 2007 and was added by about twenty-eight urban contemporary stations and very few rhythmic contemporary stations. On September 1, 2007, it debuted on the US Billboard Bubbling Under R&B/Hip-Hop Singles chart at number nine which is equivalent to number 109 on the Hot R&B/Hip-Hop Songs chart. "Ghetto" neither managed to climb any higher on that particular chart, nor made it to any other official chart. Although Rowland noted that it was her decision to pick the track as the album's second single, she somewhat regretted to release it retrospectively and opted to have it removed from the international deluxe edition reissue of Ms. Kelly.

== Music video ==
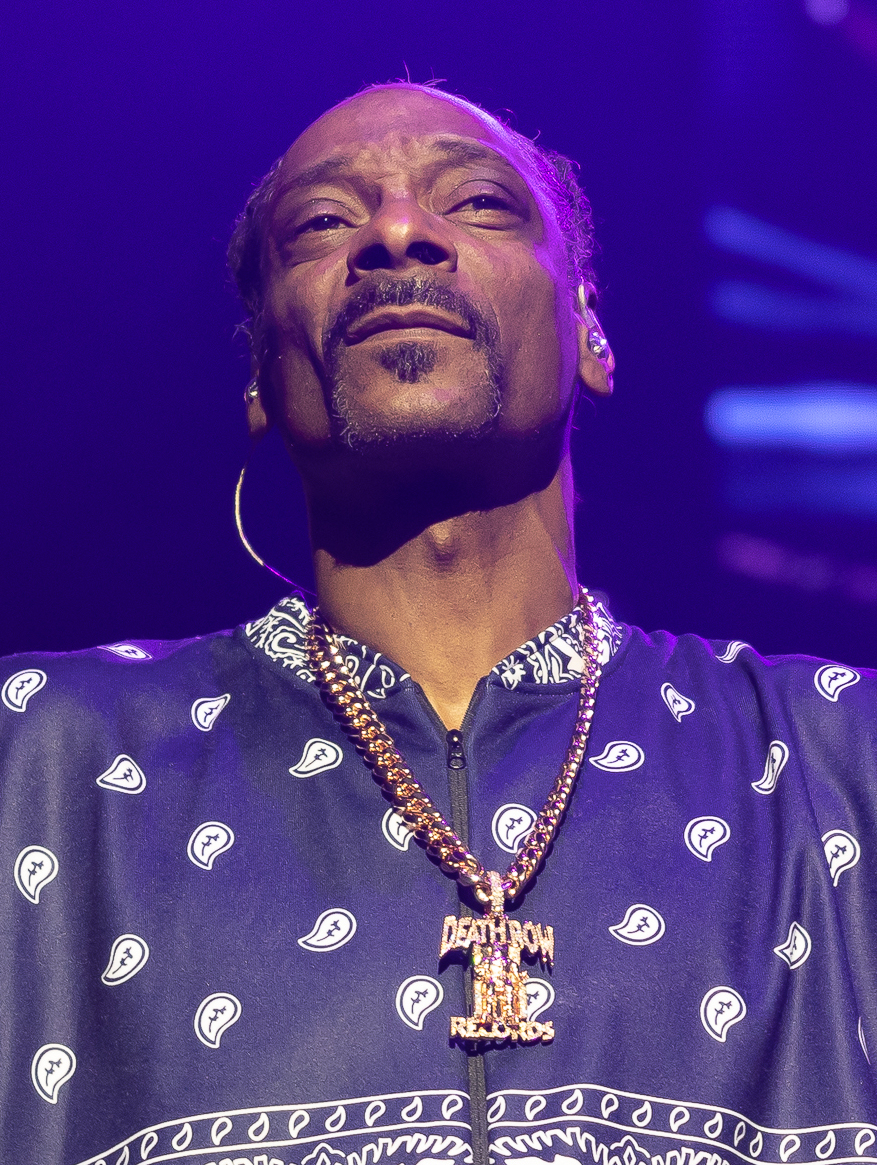
Snoop Dogg appears in the video to "Ghetto".

An accompanying music video for "Ghetto" was directed by Andrew Gura and filmed in Los Angeles, California on August 23, 2007. Next to Rowland and Snoop Dogg, rappers MC Eiht, Kam, and Soopafly make cameo appearances in the visual. Production on the video was helmed by Partizan Entertainment, with Melissa Larsen serving as producer. Main camera was operated by Shawn Kim, while editing was overseen by T. David Binns. Special effect were provided by Laundy. Displaying hip hop fashion and ghetto fabulous aesthetics, the video depicts Rowland and Snoop Dogg dancing and performing in front of different lowriders, intercut by animated solo performances of Rowland. When asked about the conception of the video, Rowland elaborated: "It's ghetto. It's really fly. I feel like everybody has some sort of element of ghetto in them. Think about it. Right? Wouldn't you say so? And everyone knows what the ghetto is."

The video world premiered at the end of the September 10, 2007 episode of BET's television series Access Granted. In his review for Videostatic, editor Craig Belcher wrote: "Rowland gets hoodcentric with this tribute to the rough life with Snoop Dogg as the guest rapper and the object of her lyrical affections. If she was looking to shed her good-girl image [...] this video certainly puts her in a different light. Rowland gyrates as dreamy images of street culture drift behind her, including 24 inch rims, platinum jewelry, golden grills [...] All that's missing is a bag of sunflower seeds and strawberry soda."

== Track listings ==
All tracks written by Tank, Lonny Bereal, Snoop Dogg, and Kelly Rowland.

Promotional single
No.	Title	Producer(s)	Length
1.	"Ghetto" (Junior Vasquez & Gomi's Jazzy radio mix)	Tank; Junior Vasquez^{[a]}; Gomi^{[a]}	3:29
2.	"Ghetto" (Junior Vasquez & Gomi's Jazzy main mix)	Tank; Vasquez^{[a]}; Gomi^{[a]}	7:56
3.	"Ghetto" (Junior Vasquez In Da Club mix)	Tank; Vasquez^{[a]}	9:52
4.	"Ghetto" (Junior Vasquez In Da Dub mix)	Tank; Vasquez^{[a]}	8:07
5.	"Ghetto" (Junior Vasquez & Gomi's Jazzy Radio TV track)	Tank; Vasquez^{[a]}; Gomi^{[a]}	8:23
6.	"Ghetto" (Junior Vasquez & Gomi's Jazzy Main TV track)	Tank; Vasquez^{[a]}; Gomi^{[a]}	7:56

Notes

- ^{^[a]} signifies additional producer

== Credits and personnel ==
Credits adapted from the liner notes of Ms. Kelly.

- Lonny Bereal – vocal producer, writing
- Snoop Dogg – vocals, writing
- Chris Jackson – audio recording
- Gelly Kusuma – engineering assistance
- Kelly Rowland – vocals, writing
- Phil Tan – mixing
- Tank – production, writing
- Rommel Nino Villanueva – engineering

== Charts ==
Weekly chart performance for "Ghetto"
Chart (2007)	Peak position
US Bubbling Under R&B/Hip-Hop Singles (Billboard)	9

== Release history ==
Release dates and formats for "Ghetto"
Region	Date	Format(s)	Label(s)	Ref.
United States	August 7, 2007	Rhythmic contemporary radio; urban contemporary radio	Columbia; Music World	
