= I Can't Hear the Music =

Single by Brutha featuring Fabolous

from the album Brutha
- Released: September 30, 2008
- Recorded: 2007
- Genre: R&B
- Length: 4:20
- Label: The Island Def Jam Music Group
- Songwriter(s): Eric Crawford, Cheyenne Harrell, Jacob Harrell, Grady Harrell, Anthony Harrell, Jared Overton, Elvis Williams, John Jackson
- Producer(s): Blac Elvis

Brutha singles chronology
"I Can't Hear the Music" (2008)	"She's Gone" (2009)

Fabolous singles chronology
"Addiction" (2008)	"I Can't Hear the Music" (2008)	"Good Lovin'" (2008)

"I Can't Hear the Music" is a song by American R&B group Brutha, released September 30, 2008 by The Island Def Jam Music Group, as the lead single from their self-titled debut album, Brutha (2008). The song, which also serves as their debut single, was produced by Blac Elvis and features a guest verse from American rapper Fabolous.

== Music video ==
The music video for "I Can't Hear the Music" was directed by Jessy Terrero, produced by Josh Goldstein. And cinematography by Brad Rushing.

== Charts ==
Chart (2009)	Peak position
U.S. Billboard Hot R&B/Hip-Hop Songs	64
