= Work (Kelly Rowland song) =

2008 single by Kelly Rowland

Single by Kelly Rowland

from the album Ms. Kelly
- Released: January 18, 2008
- Studio: Hit Factory Criteria (Miami)
- Genre: R&B; hip-hop (album version); Dance-pop; R&B (Freemasons version)
- Length: 3:28 (album version); 3:13 (Freemasons radio edit)
- Label: Columbia; Music World
- Songwriters: Jason "Poo Bear" Boyd; Scott Storch; Kelly Rowland
- Producers: Scott Storch; Jason "Poo Bear" Boyd; Freemasons (remix)

Kelly Rowland singles chronology
"Ghetto" (2007)	"Work" (2008)	"Daylight" (2008)

"Work" is a song by American recording artist Kelly Rowland. It was written by Rowland along with Scott Storch and Jason "Poo Bear" Boyd for her second studio album, Ms. Kelly (2007), while production was helmed by Storch and Boyd. An up-tempo party record that displays elements of funk and go-go, "Work" is composed in the key of E♭ minor. Lyrically, the song speaks of a woman who affirms to her man that actions speak louder than words and that she is not a woman who is easy to get to.

Intended to be released as Ms. Kelly's lead single at one time or another, "Work" was eventually released as the album's second single during the first quarter of 2008 in most international music markets, excluding North America, where "Ghetto" featuring rapper Snoop Dogg was issued instead. Prominently pushed by a bhaṅgṛā-infused dance pop remix by British DJ duo Freemasons, which, according to Rowland, gave it "new life", "Work" enjoyed major commercial success and eventually became Rowland's best-charting solo single in years, reaching the top-ten in Australia, Finland, France, Greece, Italy, Switzerland, Turkiye and the United Kingdom.

"Work" was acclaimed by music critics who highlighted the pulsating beat, suggestive lyrics, and the fast and stuttered style in which Rowland sings. The music video for "Work" was filmed in Los Angeles and directed by Philip Andelman. It shows Rowland and her dancers posed in silhouette and shot against backdrops of vivid color and beam lighting that is used to create kaleidoscope effects. "Work" was part of Rowland's set list for her Ms. Kelly Tour.

== Writing and recording ==
"Work" was written by Rowland, Scott Storch and his protégé Jason "Poo Bear" Boyd. The song is one out of two tracks which the trio crafted for Ms. Kelly and was among eight new tracks that Rowland recorded near completion in 2006 for the revamped version of My Story, the album's actual version. Conceived during a studio session at The Hit Factory in Miami, Rowland, Storch and Boyd began to work on melodic ideas for the song over an instrumental track by Storch. With most of its lyrics being written after returning from a night out in the city, composing for "Work" was eventually finished in "like twenty minutes," according to Rowland. The team returned the next day for vocal recording. Vocal production was helmed by Rowland and Boyd, while engineering was overseen by Conrad Golding and Rommel Nino Villanueva with assistance by Vadim Chislov. Mixing was handled Jason Goldstein; Christian Baker served as his assistant. Storch and Boyd received producer and co-producer credits, respectively.

Initially titled "Put It in", Rowland has described the song as "a party record, a record that'd make you get up and dance." An up-tempo composition featuring funk production and go-go elements, it is composed in E♭ minor and moves at a moderate tempo of 104 beats per minute. Set in common time, "Work" is written in the common verse-chorus form. When asked if the song was about sexual intercourse in a 2008 interview with music website Popjustice, Rowland commented: "Oh no, it's actually very innocent [...] It's a little aggressive maybe. It's just a woman saying you can't catch me easy and you have to put in the work. It's about putting in work – that's it, of course.." However, in 2010, she admitted that she previously shied away from explaining the true nature of the lyrics to the song, telling British gay lifestyle magazine Attitude: "The lyrics are very sexy, they were out of the box for me [...] But I've grown into my sexuality and I'm very comfortable with it. OK, yes, it means exactly what you think it means! I've never told anybody that, but yes, it's exactly what you think it is [...] I remember when the writer was writing it and he was like, 'Put it in, put it in', and I said, 'This is a nasty record'."

== Critical reception ==
"Work" was highly acclaimed by music critics. In his review for New York Post, writer Dan Aquilante named "Work" Ms. Kelly's best track, calling it an "upbeat record that soulfully delves into contemporary funk." Spence D. of media website IGN observed that the song flipped the early musical script of the album "for a hot minute, going for a more driven, throbbing thrust over which Rowland's flitters and flirts." He further said that "it showcases her strengths, but also still highlights her delicate vocal limitations. It's a sticky wicket that bumps while breaking down." Guardian journalist Alex MacPherson wrote that "the caffeinated 'Work' is the best [of] three club bangers on Ms. Kelly," while That Grape Juice cited it as "one of many highlights; with a pulsating beat and deliberately suggestive lyrics, Rowland doesn’t hold back." RWD editor Emmanuel Ezugwu found "Work" a "high energy track that will undoubtedly be a future club banger. The constant cow bells adds to the frenzied pace of the record and Kelly’s vocals are fast and stuttered."

About.com editor Mark Edward Nero called the song an "excellent, Destiny's Child-type song that [...] minimizes Kelly's vocal shortcomings behind an attention-catching beat." BBC critic Gemma Padley also compared the track favorably to Rowland's former band's singles "Bug a Boo" (1999) and "Lose My Breath" (2004) due to "its jagged vocal and hip shaking beat." Similarly, Sal Cinquemani from Slant remarked that "Storch delivers on “Work,” a funky, fast-paced thumper in the DC tradition," while Glenn Gamboa, writing for The News & Observer, noted that Rowland "sounds like her brassy Destiny's Child self on the elaborate" record. However, San Francisco Weekly writer Dan Leroy was less emphathic with "Work", calling it "derivative," while Dotmusic's Jaime Gill considered the track a mis-step: "'Work' is a clear attempt to encroach on her old band mates' hyper-sexual territory, although it's hard to imagine Beyoncé resorting to as crass a single entendre as repeatedly demanding "put it in!" like a hooker on crystal meth."

== Commercial performance ==
Although Columbia Records intended to release "Work" as Ms. Kelly's lead single at one time or another, Polow da Don-produced "Like This" eventually replaced original lead single "Gotsta Go" in early 2007 as Rowland thought the song had no hit potential, influenced by negative blog comments she had read after snippets of "Work" had leaked on May 31, 2007. First released in the United Kingdom on January 21, 2008, "Work" debuted at number 56 on the UK Singles Chart based on digital sales alone, two weeks prior to the song's physical release. The biggest-moving single of the week, it rose twenty-four places to number seven on January 26, 2008, marking Rowland's fifth non-consecutive top-ten entry. On February 3, "Work" reached its peak position at number four on that particular chart. It then spent six weeks within the top-ten, the longest stay of any of Rowland's singles, and, as of November 2011, became Rowland's fourth best-selling solo single in the United Kingdom with 250,000 copies being sold.

In Australia, it reached number six on the ARIA Singles Chart and went on to be certified platinum by the Australian Recording Industry Association (ARIA) for sales of 70,000 copies. It also reached the top-ten of the singles charts in Estonia, Finland, France, Greece, Italy (where it was certified platinum for more than 31,000 digital downloads), Switzerland and Turkey. It reached number one in Bulgaria, Poland and on UK R&B and German Black Charts. Following the less successful chart performances of "Like This" and "Ghetto", "Work" widely exceeded the success of its predecessor. It has since become the third highest-charting single of Rowland's solo career, behind her 2002 collaboration "Dilemma" and subsequent "Stole," entering foreign music markets where previous efforts failed to chart on.

== Music video ==
Screenshot of Kelly Rowland and her female dancers in the music video for "Work" (Los Angeles; 2007).

An accompanying music video for "Work" with directed by American music video director and photographer Philip Andelman and was filmed in Los Angeles, California on July 26, 2007. It was shot back to back with Rowland's video for her song "Comeback". According to Rowland, the choreography-heavy "hype energized" video is about "movement and color and really cool angles, shots and lights." Set amid a variety of fluorescent light environments, it features the singer and a team of dancers performing Bollywood-style dance numbers. Rowland noted that the video was different from her previous videos since her styling introduced a sexier image of her.

The imagery used in this video can be described as Rowland and her dancers posed in silhouette and shot against backdrops of vivid color and beam lighting. The beam lighting is used throughout the video to create a kaleidoscope effect which is used to break up each scene. During the last part of the clip the lighting schemes are reversed to show Rowland and her four dancers out of silhouette and performing a choreographed Bollywood-style routine against a black backdrop. Two versions of the video were made; one with the original album version and one with the Freemasons radio edit.

"Work" was originally set to premiere during the September 10, 2007, episode of BET's Access Granted, along with the music video for "Ghetto", however, this did not materialize as there was confusion over which would be Rowland's next single, as the artist now had three videos shot. After her record label rescheduled the air date to October 22, 2007, the release was further pushed back, and the video finally premiered on the December 5, 2007, at SoUrban.com, the record label website for the Sony Urban Music division in the United Kingdom. In 2009, the video for "Work" was temporarily removed from video-sharing platforms such as YouTube and MTV.com after the estate of American minimalist Dan Flavin declared that similarities with Flavin's work had led to legal action, involving monetary damages for the estate.

== Remixes ==
In support of its single release, Columbia Records consulted several British DJs to produce remixes of "Work" for international music markets where, other than in the United States, pure pop and funky house had dominated radio and the charts in the mid-2000s. While Steve Pitron and Max Sanna collaborated on a fast-paced bitpop version of the song, Russell Small and James Wiltshire from DJ duo Freemasons created a bhangra-infused dance pop remix of "Work" that blends disco music with Indian instruments. Known for their Grammy-nominated work with Beyoncé, Rowland's team approached Freemasons to rework her song after their club-oriented remix of "Déjà Vu" (2006) had received significantly more airplay on British radio than Beyoncé's R&B-led original. When asked about the collaboration, Rowland elaborated in an interview with British music magazine Blues & Soul: "I remember my A&R telling me what a great job they'd done with Beyoncé's remixes and that we should give them a try. So we did."

Columbia Records arranged for "Work" to be released in a tandem, with both versions being serviced to European radio. In addition, a music video for the Freemasons remix was released. Critics were favorable in their reviews of the remix, with Popjustice calling it "quite brilliant." As with "Déjà Vu", it tested well with audiences and soon surpassed Storch's original production on radio, becoming a top ten hit on the charts. Rowland further commented on the remix in 2008: "I'm really grateful to the Freemasons for coming along [...], because it's something that I could have got. You always need an extra brain there and they just gave it a new vibe." However, while the song enjoyed international success, it was not released stateside. When asked why it was not issued in the United States, Rowland answered: "I don't know, seriously, I feel like I didn't have anything to do with the success of 'Work' in Europe. The Freemasons remix took the song to the next level, fans kept requesting it on the radio. Look at Destiny's Child's 'Say My Name', the fans in the U.S. made it a single, they made it happen, I didn't have that little extra with 'Work' over there." In 2018, Wiltshire named "Work" his favorite remix.

== Track listings ==
All tracks written by Jason "Poo Bear" Boyd, Scott Storch, and Kelly Rowland.

European maxi single
No.	Title	Producer(s)	Length
1.	"Work" (Freemasons Radio Edit)	Storch; Boyd^{[a]}; Freemasons^{[b]}	3:11
2.	"Work" (Album Version)	Storch; Boyd^{[a]}	3:28
3.	"Work" (Steve Pitron & Max Sanna Radio Edit)	Storch; Boyd^{[a]}; Max Sanna^{[b]}; Steve Pitron^{[b]}	3:32
4.	"Work" (Freemasons Dub Mix)	Storch; Boyd^{[a]}; Freemasons^{[b]}	7:07
5.	"Work" (Music video)
Total length:			17:19

European / Australian single
No.	Title	Producer(s)	Length
1.	"Work" (Freemasons Radio Edit)	Storch; Boyd^{[a]}; Freemasons^{[b]}	3:11
2.	"Work" (Album Version)	Storch; Boyd^{[a]}	3:28
Total length:			6:39

Notes

- ^{^[a]} signifies co-producer
- ^{^[b]} signifies additional producer

== Credits and personnel ==
Credits adapted from the liner notes of Ms. Kelly.

- Christian Baker – mixing assistance
- Jason "Poo Bear" Boyd – writing, co-production, vocal production
- Vadim Chislov – assistance
- Conrad Golding – engineering
- Jason Goldstein – mixing
- Kelly Rowland – vocals, writing, vocal production
- Scott Storch – writing, production, vocal production
- Rommel Nino Villanueva – engineering

== Charts ==
=== Weekly charts ===
Weekly chart performance for "Work"
Chart (2008–2009)	Peak position
Australia (ARIA)	6
Australian Urban (ARIA)	2
Austria (Ö3 Austria Top 40)	32
Belgium (Ultratip Bubbling Under Flanders)	3
Belgium (Ultratop 50 Wallonia)	37
CIS Airplay (TopHit)	8
CIS Airplay (TopHit) Steve Pitron & Max Sanna radio edit	62
Czech Republic Airplay (ČNS IFPI)	38
European Hot 100 Singles (Billboard)	7
Finland (Suomen virallinen lista)	4
France (SNEP)	4
Germany (GfK)	25
Global Dance Songs (Billboard)	16
Greece (IFPI)	6
Hungary (Rádiós Top 40)	27
Ireland (IRMA)	12
Italy (FIMI)	6
Netherlands (Dutch Top 40)	18
Netherlands (Single Top 100)	14
New Zealand (Recorded Music NZ)	10
Norway (VG-lista)	17
Romania (Romanian Top 100)	13
Russia Airplay (TopHit)	29
Russia Airplay (TopHit) Freemasons remix	78
Russia Airplay (TopHit) Steve Pitron & Max Sanna radio edit	84
Scottish Singles Sales (Official Charts)	6
Slovakia Airplay (ČNS IFPI)	13
Switzerland (Schweizer Hitparade)	8
Turkey (Turkiye Top 20)	3
UK Singles (Official Charts)	4
UK Singles Downloads (Official Charts)	4
UK Hip Hop/R&B (Official Charts)	1

=== Year-end charts ===
Year-end chart performance for "Work"
Chart (2008)	Position
Australia (ARIA)	39
Australian Urban (ARIA)	12
CIS (TopHit)	58
European Hot 100 Singles (Billboard)	51
France (SNEP)	77
France Airplay (SNEP)	100
Hungary (Rádiós Top 40)	79
Netherlands Downloads (MegaCharts)	78
Russia Airplay (TopHit)	147
Russia Airplay (TopHit) Freemasons remix	164
Russia Airplay (TopHit) Steve Pitron & Max Sanna radio edit	163
Switzerland (Schweizer Hitparade)	52
UK Singles (OCC)	52

== Certifications ==
Certifications and sales for "Work"
Region	Certification	Certified units/sales
Australia (ARIA)	Platinum	70,000^{^}
Italy	—	31,386
New Zealand (RMNZ)	Gold	7,500^{*}
United Kingdom (BPI)	Gold	400,000^{‡}
^{*} Sales figures based on certification alone.^{^} Shipments figures based on certification alone.^{‡} Sales+streaming figures based on certification alone.

== Release history ==
Release dates and formats for "Work"
Region	Date	Format(s)	Label(s)	Ref.
United Kingdom	January 18, 2008	Digital download (EP)	RCA	
United Kingdom	January 21, 2008	Digital download	RCA	
United Kingdom	January 28, 2008	CD	RCA	
United Kingdom	February 18, 2008	Digital download (2-track)	RCA	
United States	February 26, 2008	Digital download (EP)	Columbia; Music World	
France	March 3, 2008	CD	Columbia	
Germany	March 7, 2008	CD; maxi CD	Sony BMG	
Australia	March 15, 2008	Digital download (EP)	Sony BMG	
Australia	March 17, 2008	CD	Sony BMG	
