= Brutha =

American R&B/soul group

- Origin: Los Angeles, California, U.S.
- Genres: R&B; soul
- Years active: 2002–2011
- Label: The Island Def Jam Music Group
- Spinoffs: Jake & Papa
- Past members: Grady Harrell III; Anthony Harrell; Jared Overton; Cheyenne "Papa" Harrell; Jacob Harrell

Brutha was an American R&B and soul group consisted of five brothers: Anthony Harrell, Cheyenne Harrell, Grady Harrell III, Jacob Harrell and Jared Overton. The group was formed in 2002 and Brian McKnight first introduced them on the 2003 Soul Train Holiday Special. The brothers were subsequently signed to Def Jam Records. The group's first album Brutha was released in December 2008. Their reality show, Brothers to Brutha, documented their rise to fame. In 2011, the three eldest brothers Grady, Anthony and Jared left the group to pursue solo careers, leaving the remaining two brothers Jacob and Cheyenne to form the duo Jake & Papa.

== History ==
=== Early life ===
The five brothers in the band are (eldest to youngest) Grady Harrell III, Anthony Harrell, Jared Overton, Cheyenne "Papa" Harrell and Jacob Harrell. Four of the brothers' father is Grady Harrell Jr., a singer from Los Angeles who made his mark in music and encouraged his sons to follow in his footsteps, while Jared has a different father and the same mother as two of his brothers making him unrelated to Cheyenne and Jacob. Their father was a disciplinarian. He taught them how to sing, while the boys' uncle Donny (Drano) Harrell furthered their music careers. However, the boys had different mothers. Papa and Jacob's mother is named Valerie. The mother of Jared, Anthony, and Grady Jr. is Nancy Lynn. Papa and Jacob were not raised by their father, as he had been convicted of fraud and was sentenced to 2.5 years in jail. The boys were raised on the music of their inspirations, which ranged from Sam Cooke to Stevie Wonder. Before hitting the "Big Time" they played graduation parties and bar mitzvahs.

=== Early career ===
The Harrell brothers came to the entertainment world at a young age out of a four-generations musical family. At 5 or 6 years old, Anthony Harrell and Grady Harrell III met up with their first cousin Canela Cox and formed the group Papa's Results, being trained and taught by Grady Harrell II, who was then signed to MCA Records prior to a prison term. The children appeared in his R&B hit single "Sticks and Stone" and Anthony provided the singing voice of young Michael Jackson played by Alex Burell in the 1992 TV mini series The Jacksons: An American Dream. Papa's results lasted until Canela moved to Holland to follow her mother's musical career. The brothers filled her spot with family friend Jeff Lee and changed their name to Serenade. They appeared on episodes of Saved by the Bell: The New Class in 1997 where Anthony played the regular role of Eric Little. As a duet consisting of Grady and Anthony, they recorded two independent albums.

=== Brutha ===
In 2002, Grady and Anthony were joined by their brothers JR, Jake, and Papa and formed the group Brutha. The group was discovered by Brian McKnight, who introduced them on the 2003 Soul Train Holiday Special. In 2008, their uncle Donny "Drano" Harrell, CEO of Goodfellas Entertainment, and Shakir Stewart, senior vice president of A&R at Island Def Jam, invited the group to Atlanta to do a filmed audition in front of Jermaine Dupri and a range of producers. The audition resulted in a one-hour special entitled Jermaine Dupri Presents: Brutha broadcast on March 24, 2008, on Peachtree TV. Dupri was impressed and signed the brothers to the Island Def Jam Music Group. In 2007, Brutha made a special guest appearance on the Discovery Kids television show Hip Hop Harry.

== Discography ==
=== Studio albums ===
Year	Information	Chart positions			Sales and certifications
Year	Information	U.S.	U.S. R&B	BCA	Sales and certifications
2008	Brutha: 1st studio album; Released: December 21, 2008; Formats: CD, digital download	81	15	89	RIAA: TBA; U.S sales: 100,000
2011	Vacancy: 2nd studio album; Released: Shelved	—	—	—	

=== Singles ===
Year	Song	Chart positions	Album
Year	Song	Hot R&B/Hip-Hop Songs	Album
2008	"I Can't Hear the Music" (featuring Fabolous)	51	Brutha
2008	"She's Gone"	103	Brutha
2010	"One Day on This Earth"	94	Vacancy
2010	"Can't Get Enough"	50	Vacancy
2011	"High Is Coming Down"	—	Vacancy
