= Blac Elvis =

American record producer

- Born: Elvis Williams; United States
- Occupations: Producer, pianist, songwriter
- Years active: 1999–present
- Label: Mars On Sunday/Solar Digital Music

Elvis Williams, better known as Blac Elvis, is an American record producer, musician, and songwriter.

== Career ==
Elvis Williams works under the name "Blac Elvis". He rose to fame in 2005 co-producing alongside Polow da Don, producing hits for Ludacris, Ciara, Kelly Rowland, Fergie, Rich Boy, Kelis, Nelly, Pussycat Dolls, and Mario.

He has launched two labels, Black Mud Entertainment and Mars On Sunday Latino. Black Mud represents a soulful and high-energy sound created by Elvis, while Mars On Sunday Latino represents Latino artists such as La Gente Del Clan.

He has produced top-40 hit singles for Fergie ("London Bridge" & "Glamorous"), Ciara ("Promise"), Kelly Rowland ("Like This"), Mario ("Crying Out For Me"), Beyoncé ("Ego"), and for Usher ("Lil Freak").

== Selected discography ==
Song	Artist	Year	Role
"At The Park"	Field Mob	2006	Producer
"Let's Be Real"	Jibbs	2006	Producer
"Blindfold Me"	Kelis (featuring Nas)	2006	Co-producer
"Promise"	Ciara	2006	Co-writer, co-producer
"Bang It Up"	Ciara	2006	Co-writer, co-producer
"London Bridge"	Fergie	2006	Co-producer
"Glamorous"	Fergie	2007	Co-producer
"Get Buck"	Young Buck	2007	Co-producer
"Like This"	Kelly Rowland (featuring Eve)	2007	Co-writer, co-producer
"Street Love"	Lloyd	2007	Co-producer
"Crying Out For Me"	Mario	2007	Co-producer
"Picture Perfect"	Yung Joc	2007	Producer
"Ghetto"	Rich Boy	2007	Producer
"Shorts like me"	Raven-Symoné	2008	Co-producer
"This Is The Life"	Rick Ross (featuring Trey Songz)	2008	Producer
"Slide Show"	T.I. (featuring John Legend)	2008	Producer
"I Can't Hear the Music"	Brutha (featuring Fabolous)	2008	Producer
"Never Ever"	Ciara (featuring Young Jeezy)	2009	Co-producer
"Ego" (+ Remix feat. Kanye West)	Beyoncé	2009	Co-writer, producer
"Freak'in Me"	Jamie Foxx (featuring Marsha Ambrosius)	2009	Producer
"Bridge of Love"	Ginuwine (featuring Brandy)	2009	Producer
"Lying to Each Other"	Ginuwine	2009	Producer
"Fakin' It"	K. Michelle (featuring Missy Elliott)	2009	Producer
"I Need a U"	Letoya Luckett	2009	Producer
"The Hardest Moment"	Mario	2009	Producer, co-writer
"Get it All"	Sean Garrett (featuring Nicki Minaj)	2010	Producer
"Lil Freak"	Usher (featuring Nicki Minaj)	2010	Co-producer
"She Geeked"	Sean Garrett (featuring Gucci Mane & Tyga)	2010	Producer
"How Many Times"	K.Michelle	2011	Producer
"Sorry"	Ciara	2012	Producer, writer
"Run Run Run"	Jill Scott	2015	Co-writer
"Simple Things"	Tamar Braxton	2015	Co-producer, co-writer
"Bust It Open" feat. B.o.B	Scotty ATL	2015	Producer
"Not a Little Bit"	K. Michelle	2016	Producer
"These Men"	K. Michelle	2016	Producer
"All I Got"	K. Michelle	2016	Producer, writer
