= Like This (Kelly Rowland song) =

2007 single by Kelly Rowland

Single by Kelly Rowland featuring Eve

from the album Ms. Kelly
- Released: March 13, 2007
- Studio: The Hit Factory (Miami, FL); Music World Studios (Houston, TX); Silent Sound Recording Studios (Atlanta, GA); Doppler Studios (Atlanta, GA); Record Plant (Hollywood, CA)
- Genre: R&B
- Length: 3:38
- Label: Columbia; Music World
- Songwriters: Sean Garrett; Eve Jeffers; Jamal Jones; Jason Perry; Kelly Rowland; Elvis Williams
- Producers: Jason Perry; Polow da Don; Sean Garrett; S-Dot; Blac Elvis

Kelly Rowland singles chronology
"Here We Go" (2005)	"Like This" (2007)	"Ghetto" (2007)

Eve singles chronology
"Rich Girl" (2004)	"Like This" (2007)	"Tambourine" (2007)

Music video
- "Like This" on YouTube

"Like This" is a song by American singer Kelly Rowland, featuring vocals by rapper Eve. Recorded late into the production of Rowland's second solo album Ms. Kelly (2007), the song was released on March 13, 2007, as the lead single from the album. The artists co-wrote the song with its producers Sean Garrett, Polow da Don, Blac Elvis, and Jason Perry, with additional production from S-Dot. "Like This" is a R&B song, with its lyrics referring to a woman growing out of a past relationship.

The song received generally positive critical reviews. Upon its release, the song became Rowland's highest-charting solo success since her 2002 single "Stole", reaching the top-ten in Ireland and the United Kingdom, as well as the top-twenty in Australia and New Zealand and number 30 on the US Billboard Hot 100 chart. In addition, it became Rowland's first single to peak at the top position on the US Billboard Hot Dance Club Play chart. An accompanying music video was directed by Mike Ruiz and filmed in the Hollywood Hills, Los Angeles, California in mid-March 2007.

== Writing and recording ==
"Like This" was written by Sean Garrett, Polow da Don, Blac Elvis, Jason Perry, Rowland, and rapper Eve Jeffers. The song was one of the last songs on the Ms. Kelly album that Rowland and Garrett started working on in mid-September 2006 after the cancellation of My Story, the album's original version. Conceived around an instrumental track from da Don, Rowland declared "Like This" the perfect example of what attitude she exactly had on her mind when creating the revamped version the album, telling MTV News in 2007: "Polow already had this hot track. I loved the sound of the cowbell; it was so different! Sean and I started writing and he said 'Kelly this is your first single'." Happy about finally running "into that song that definitely sticks out" after many months recording, Rowland eventually took a break from recording.

Initially titled "Wooo!" and "Bump like This", Rowland resumed recording weeks later after she had approached Eve to appear on the song. "I just heard Eve on this song", she recalled. "I knew her energy belonged on the song and, just like that, it all came together. Then I knew: This was the single [...] and it turned out he [Sean] was right." Garrett further elaoborated in an interview with MTV: "It's a great combination of her thoughts and her feel on the type of music that she likes to do. It's a cross between something in a club and on mainstream radio. We're just trying to stay a step ahead of what's going on." Alongside Polow da Don, Garrett, S-Dot, and Elvis received co-producer credits on "Like This". Vocal production was helmed by Rowland and Max Gousse, while mixing was handled Jean Marie Horvat, with Colin Miller serving as assistant.

== Critical reception ==
"Like This" received generally positive reviews from contemporary music critics. Spence D. of media website IGN observed that "Rowland's playfully serious stance is exposed on the jump off track, which surges to a Polow the Don groove that is slinky and invigorating. Toss in a little cameo from Eve and you've got one of those sizzling summertime mid-tempo jammies that'll appeal to even the most sullen of R&B pop fans." BBC critic Gemma Padley wrote that the song "works an hypnotic riff not a million miles away from Snoop Dogg’s “Drop It Like It’s Hot” Billboard felt that "compared with her gospel-fueled 2002 solo debut Simply Deep, Rowland appears confident and dominant on foot-stompers like [...] the Eve-assisted single." Metro's Shereen Low declared it a "stomping tune," while Sal Cinquemani from Slant called the song "hot and fresh" and ranked it 33rd on Slant's Best Albums & Singles of 2007 listing.

Michael Slezak from Entertainment Weekly found that "it’s gotta bouncy enough beat, and a 'ladies leave your man at home' vibe that’s reminiscent of Destiny’s Child’s “Jumpin', Jumpin'” but aside from the bridge, the vocal could’ve been handled by pretty much any female singer on the charts today [...] And shouldn’t a singer of Kelly’s caliber deliver something a little more distinctive for a lead single?" Guardian journalist Rosie Swash found that "whilst "Like This" is hardly Rowland's Sistine Chapel, the 26-year-old's new track does have something to it [...] The rumbling drums, the sparse keyboard chords, the Lil' Kim-esque "I told y'all I was gonna bump like this!", well, damned if Rowland isn't having the time of her life." In his review for Splice Today, Noah Berlatsky called the song "surprisingly strong." He further added: "Rowland’s thick Houston accent wrapps itself around a sparse head-nodding hook. The song had character and made you remember why you always liked that best friend on the sitcom better than the boring lead."

== Commercial performance ==
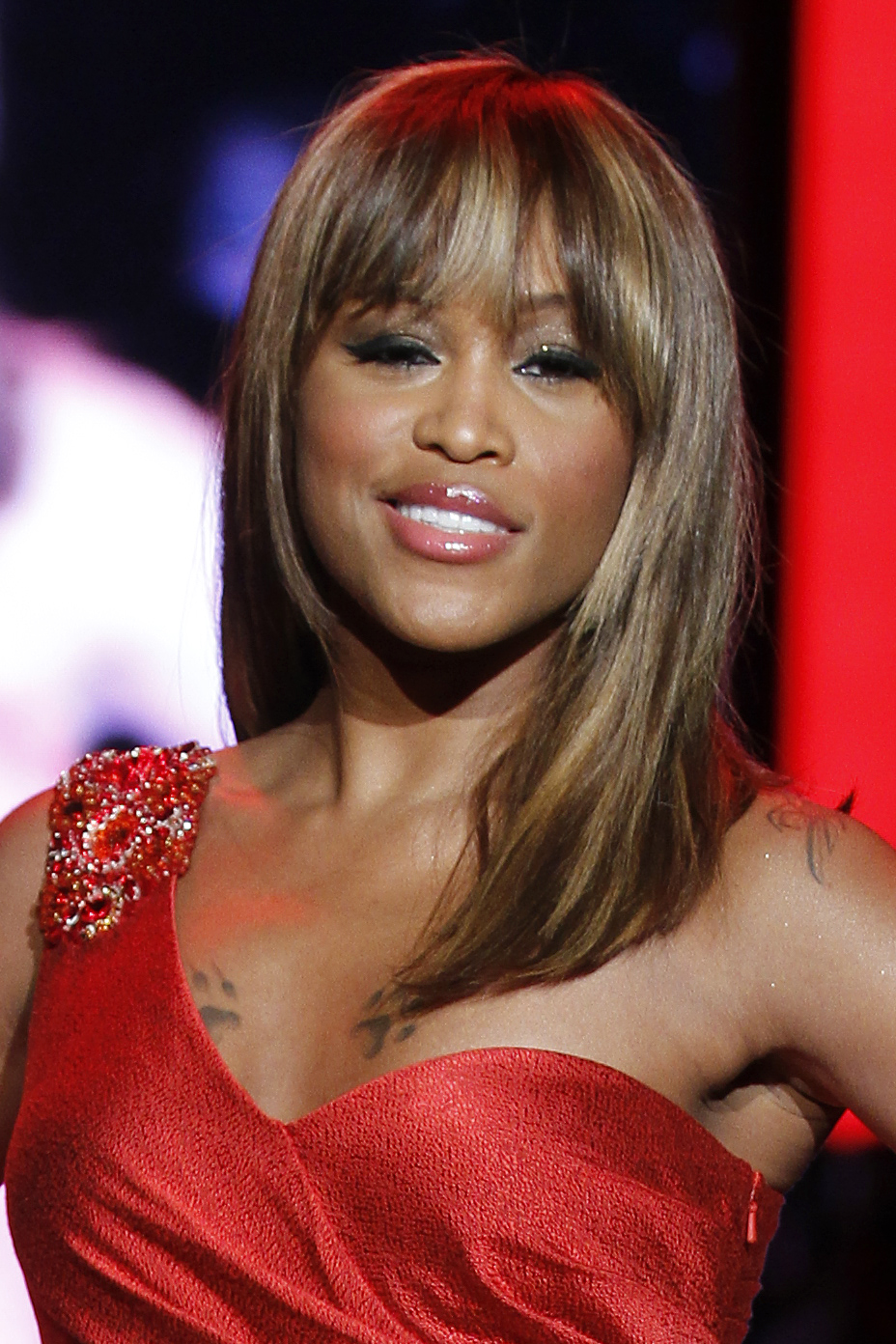
Rowland consulted rapper Eve (pictured) to contribute to "Like This".

While Columbia Records intended to release "Work" as Ms. Kelly's lead single at a particular time, "Like This" eventually replaced the album's original lead single "Gotsta Go", a collaboration with rapper Da Brat. On February 13, 2007, a ninety-second clip of the song leaked onto the internet, and by February 16 a full low quality preview had leaked. First release stateside, "Like This" debuted at number ninety-six on the US Billboard Hot 100 issue dated March 31, 2007. Although the song fell off the chart the following week, it re-entered at number ninety-eight the following week. It eventually peaked at number thirty on the Billboard Hot 100 and at number seven on Billboard's Hot R&B/Hip-Hop Songs chart. In addition, the song peaked on top of both the Billboard Hot R&B/Hip-Hop Singles Sales chart and the Hot Singles Sales chart as well as the Hot Dance Club Play chart. It also reached the top ten on the R&B Digital Song Sales chart.

As with Rowland's previous single releases, "Like This" became a larger success outside North America. In the United Kingdom, it debuted at number eighteen on the UK Singles Chart based on digital sales alone, the day before the song's physical release. Once the physical copies of "Like This" were released on June 11, 2007, the song climbed to number four on the UK Singles Chart, and went on to spend four weeks inside the UK top-ten, making it Rowland's second-highest-charting solo single on the chart (not counting her featured role on "Dilemma"). It eventually sold 95,000 copies. In Ireland, "Like This" debuted at number thirty and reached number five in its fourth week on the chart, becoming her third top-ten single in Ireland. In Germany, the song was released on digital formats only and failed to chart on any official singles chart.

== Music video ==
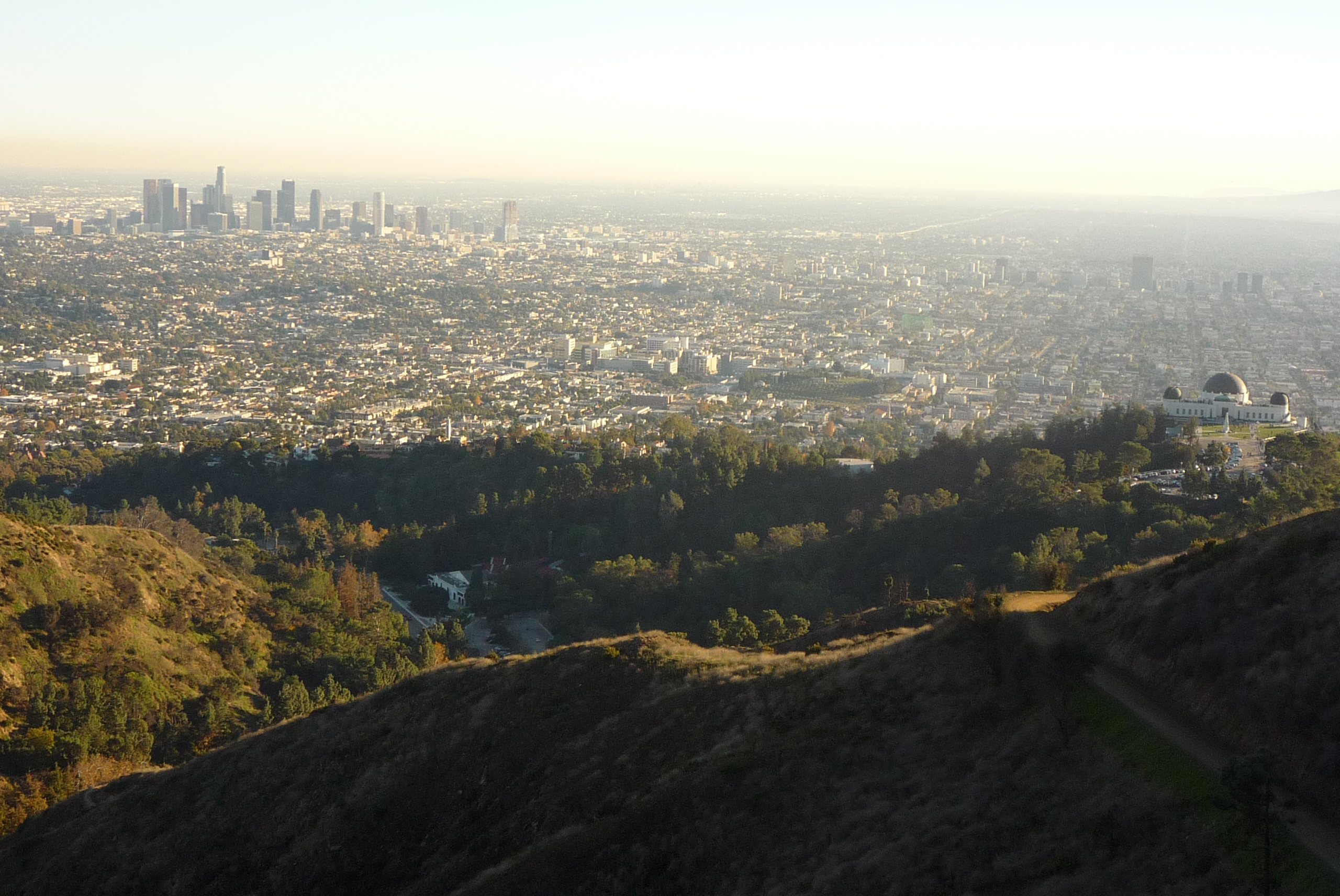
A music video for "Like This" was filmed at the Hollywood Hills.

The music video for the song was directed by Mike Ruiz and shot on-location at a Hollywood Hills house in Los Angeles, California on March 12, 2007. Rowland premiered the video on MTV's countdown show Total Request Live on March 26, 2007. The video debuted on BET network's 106 & Park on May 24, 2007, where it peaked at number-three on the show's countdown.

The video starts with Rowland walking into her bedroom after taking a shower. When she notices a webcast of her, she quickly throws a towel over it. She is then next seen in front of her vanity table, getting ready for a party while singing the lyrics. The video then shows Rowland in a dark room with a chair. During the first, scenes are shown of the Rowland in front of the dresser and the Rowland in the dark room, performing what seems to be the same choreography — the latter with the chair in the room, the former with the chair in front of her dresser. By the second verse, the Rowland in the dark room is the only one with the chair. scenes of her are shown throughout the song. During the video, the audience sees Rowland at the party in her living room. Eve enters, rapping her solo verse with scenes of Rowland performing more choreography. In the final scene the audience sees Rowland performing more choreography while sitting in the chair seductively as glitter is seen flying upwards from the floor.

== Formats and track listings ==
UK enhanced CD single

1. "Like This" (album version) – 3:38
2. "Like This" (DJ Speedy remix edit feat Sean P) – 3:29
3. "Like This" (Redline radio remix) – 2:48
4. "Like This" (DJ Escape & Tony Coluccio radio remix) – 3:33
5. "Like This" (video)

UK CD single

1. "Like This" (album version) – 3:38
2. "Like This" (Redline radio remix) – 2:48

CD single

1. "Like This" (album version) – 3:38
2. "Like This" (instrumental) – 3:35

US vinyl single

1. "Like This" (album version) – 3:38
2. "Like This" (instrumental) – 3:35
3. "Like This" feat. Sean P (DJ Speedy remix edit)
4. "Like This" (Redline club remix)

== Credits and personnel ==
Credits are adapted from the liner notes of Ms. Kelly.

- Kelly Rowland – vocals, writing
- Eve – featured artist, rapping, writing
- Polow da Don – writing, production
- Blac Elvis – writing, co-production
- Jason Perry – writing, co-production
- Sean Garrett – writing, co-production, vocal arrangement
- S-Dot – co-production
- Max Gousse – vocal arrangement
- Wayne Allison – engineering
- Rommel Nino Villanueva – engineering
- Vernon Mungo – engineering
- Brian Sumner – engineering
- David Montecelo – assistance
- Kory Aaron – assistance
- Nate Hertweck – assistance
- Jean Marie Horvat – mixing
- Colin Miller – mixing assistance
- Chris Gehringer – mastering

== Charts ==
=== Weekly charts ===
Weekly chart performance for "Like This"
Chart (2007)	Peak position
Australia (ARIA)	13
Australian Urban (ARIA)	4
Austria (Ö3 Austria Top 40)	75
Belgium (Ultratop 50 Flanders)	50
Belgium (Ultratip Bubbling Under Wallonia)	6
Canada Hot 100 (Billboard)	76
European Hot 100 Singles (Billboard)	16
Global Dance Songs (Billboard)	21
Ireland (IRMA)	5
Japan (Oricon)	94
Netherlands (Dutch Top 40 Tipparade)	6
Netherlands (Single Top 100)	85
New Zealand (Recorded Music NZ)	11
Scotland Singles (OCC)	13
Switzerland (Schweizer Hitparade)	77
UK Singles (OCC)	4
UK Hip Hop/R&B (OCC)	2
US Billboard Hot 100	30
US Dance Club Songs (Billboard)	1
US Hot R&B/Hip-Hop Songs (Billboard)	7

=== Year-end charts ===
Year-end chart performance for "Like This"
Chart (2007)	Position
Australia (ARIA)	84
Australian Urban (ARIA)	20
UK Singles (OCC)	103
UK Urban (Music Week)	6
US Dance Club Play (Billboard)	28
US Hot R&B/Hip-Hop Songs (Billboard)	37

== Certifications ==
Certifications for "Like This"
Region	Certification	Certified units/sales
New Zealand (RMNZ)	Gold	15,000^{‡}
United Kingdom (BPI)	Silver	200,000^{‡}
United States (RIAA)	Gold	500,000^{‡}
^{‡} Sales+streaming figures based on certification alone.

== Release history ==
Release dates and formats for "Like This"
Region	Date	Format(s)	Label(s)	Ref.
United States	March 13, 2007	Digital download	Columbia; Music World	
United States	March 27, 2007	Rhythmic contemporary radio	Columbia; Music World	
United States	May 29, 2007	12-inch vinyl; CD; maxi CD	Columbia; Music World	
United Kingdom	June 11, 2007	12-inch vinyl; maxi CD	Columbia	
Australia	June 12, 2007	Digital download	Sony BMG	
United Kingdom	July 9, 2007	Digital download (EP)	Columbia	
