= Doctor Love (album) =

Studio album by Alex Gaudino
- Released: 12 March 2013
- Recorded: Magnificent Studio (Milan, Italy)
- Genre: Dance, house, electro house
- Label: Ultra Music, Happy Records, Rise
- Producer: Alex Gaudino, Jason Rooney

Alex Gaudino chronology
My Destination (2008)	Doctor Love (2013)

Singles from Doctor Love
- 1. "I'm in Love (I Wanna Do It)" Released: 19 September 2010; 2. "What a Feeling" Released: 22 March 2011; 3. "I Don't Wanna Dance" Released: 3 September 2012; 4. "Playing with My Heart" Released: 28 January 2013; 5. "Is This Love" Released: 26 February 2013; 6. "Beautiful" Released: 23 July 2013

Doctor Love is the second studio album by Italian DJ and music producer Alex Gaudino. The album features a number of well-known artists such as Kelly Rowland, Jordin Sparks, Mario, The Black Eyed Peas's Taboo, and Jay Sean among others. It was released on March 12, 2013.

== Background ==
It is the first LP by Alex Gaudino since the release of his first album, My Destination, back in 2008. Six singles have been released from the album: "I'm in Love (I Wanna Do It)" in 2010, "What a Feeling", featuring Kelly Rowland, in 2011, "I Don't Wanna Dance", featuring Taboo, in 2012, "Playing with My Heart", featuring Canadian singer JRDN, "Is This Love", featuring Jordin Sparks and "Beautiful", featuring Mario, all in 2013, and received positive reviews from critics.

== Track listing ==
No.	Title	Writer(s)	Length
1.	"I'm in Love (I Wanna Do It)"	Alex Gaudino, Giuseppe D'Albenzio, Tim Powell	2:52
2.	"What a Feeling" (featuring Kelly Rowland)	Gaudino, D'Albenzio, Emmanuel Mijares, Jenson Vaughan, Kelly Rowland, Lonny Bereal	2:58
3.	"Is This Love" (featuring Jordin Sparks)	Gaudino, Jordin Sparks	2:54
4.	"Beautiful" (featuring Mario)	Gaudino, Mario Dewar Barrett	3:38
5.	"Playing with My Heart" (featuring JRDN)	Gaudino, D'Albenzio, Jenson Vaughan, Jason Derulo	3:05
6.	"Magnificent" (featuring Polina)	Gaudino, Polina Goudieva	3:35
7.	"Your Love Gets Me High" (featuring Mandy Ventrice)	Gaudino, Mandy Ventrice	3:44
8.	"I Don't Wanna Dance" (featuring Taboo)	Gaudino, D'Albenzio, Taio Cruz, Jaime Luis Gomez	3:07
9.	"All I Want" (featuring Niles Mason)	Gaudino, Niles Mason	3:19
10.	"Promise" (featuring Jay Sean)	Gaudino, Jay Sean	3:00
11.	"Miami Penthouse"	Gaudino	7:01
12.	"Do You Wanna"	Gaudino	5:36
13.	"Brazil" (featuring Bottai)	Gaudino, Bottai	6:22
14.	"Is This Love (Benny Benassi Remix)" (featuring Jordin Sparks)	Gaudino, Jordin Sparks	5:13
15.	"I Don't Wanna Dance (Simon de Jano Remix)" (featuring Taboo)	Gaudino, D'Albenzio, Taio Cruz, Jaime Luis Gomez	5:04

== Release history ==
Region	Date	Format(s)	Label
Italy	12 March 2013	Digital download	Ultra Music, Rise
United Kingdom	12 March 2013	Digital download	Ultra Music, Rise
United States	12 March 2013	Digital download	Ultra Music, Rise
