= Ultra.2012 =

Compilation album (Mix)
- Released: (United States) November 8, 2011
- Genre: Dance
- Label: Ultra Records

chronology
Ultra.2011 (2010)	Ultra.2012 (2011)	Ultra.2013 (2012)

Ultra.2012 is a dance compilation album from Ultra Records, compiling original and remixed tracks from the label. It was released on November 8, 2011. The album features a wide array of popular dance and electronic artists. Unlike Ultra.2011, a Canadian version was not made and this CD was only released in the US. However, the next installment, Ultra.2013 was released in both the US and Canada and had one version for both countries.

== Track listing ==
Disc One:

1. "Mr. Saxobeat (Extended Mix)" - Alexandra Stan
2. "Addiction (Extended Mix)" - Medina
3. "Cinema (Skrillex Remix)" - Benny Benassi feat. Gary Go
4. "Raise Your Weapon" - deadmau5
5. "Love Is Darkness (Original Mix)" - Sander van Doorn feat. Carol Lee
6. "Eyes (Extended Mix)" - Kaskade feat. Mindy Gledhill
7. "Feel So Close (Extended Mix)" - Calvin Harris
8. "What a Feeling (Extended Mix)" - Alex Gaudino feat. Kelly Rowland
9. "Forever (Extended Mix)" - Wolfgang Gartner feat. will.i.am
10. "Loca People (US Clean Edit)" - Sak Noel
11. "Sun Is Up (Play & Win Radio Edit)" - Inna
12. "Throw Your Hands Up (Dancar Kuduro)" - Qwote feat. Pitbull & Lucenzo

Disc Two:

1. "Where You Wanna Go (Original Mix)" - Mischa Daniels feat. J-Son
2. "Welcome to St. Tropez (DJ Antoine vs Mad Mark Clean Remix)" - DJ Antoine vs. Timati feat. Kalenna
3. "You Just Don't Love Me (Extended Mix)" - David Morales & Jonathan Mendelsohn
4. "Sun & Moon (Club Mix)" - Above & Beyond feat. Richard Bedford
5. "Feel It (Original Extended Mix)" - Ferry Corsten
6. "Niton (The Reason) (Extended)" - Eric Prydz
7. "Boy (Hardwell Remix)" - Adrian Lux feat. Rebecca & Fiona
8. "No Beef" - Afrojack & Steve Aoki feat. Miss Palmer
9. "Natural Disaster (Original)" - Laidback Luke vs Example
10. "Drowning (Avicii Remix)" - Armin van Buuren feat. Laura V
11. "Little Bird (Extended Mix)" - Kim Sozzi
12. "Alone Again (Original Mix)"- Alyssa Reid feat. Jump Smokers
