= Ultra.2011 =

Compilation album (Mix)
- Released: (United States) November 9, 2010
- Genre: Dance
- Label: Ultra Records

chronology
Ultra.2010 (2010)	Ultra.2011 (2010)	Ultra.2012 (2012)

Ultra.2011 is a dance compilation album from Ultra Records, compiling original and remixed tracks from the label. It was released on November 9, 2010. Compared to Ultra.2010, the majority of this compilation consists of extended versions of the normal songs. Canadian and US versions of the album were released.

== Track listing ==
Disc One (US):

1. "We No Speak Americano" - Yolanda Be Cool vs. DCUP
2. "Stereo Love" - Edward Maya and Vika Jigulina
3. "Alejandro (Dave Audé Remix)" - Lady Gaga
4. "Tik Tok" - Ke$ha
5. "One [Your Name] (Vocal Mix)" - Swedish House Mafia ft. Pharrell
6. "Fire In Your New Shoes (Extended)" - Kaskade ft. Dragonette
7. "Ghosts 'n' Stuff" - deadmau5 ft. Rob Swire
8. "Take Over Control (Extended)" - Afrojack ft. Eva Simons
9. "Flashback (David Guetta's One Love Remix)" - Calvin Harris
10. "I'm In Love (Vocal Club Mix)" - Alex Gaudino
11. "My Girl (Disco Fries Remix)" - Honorebel ft. Sean Kingston, and Trina
12. "2Gether (Extended)" - Roger Sanchez ft. Far East Movement

Disc One (Canada):

1. "We No Speak Americano" - Yolanda Be Cool vs. DCUP
2. "Stereo Love" - Edward Maya and Mia Martina
3. "Hey, Soul Sister (Karmatronic Club Mix)" - Train
4. "Alejandro (Dave Audé Remix)" - Lady Gaga
5. "No Superstar" - Remady
6. "One [Your Name] (Vocal Mix)" - Swedish House Mafia ft. Pharrell
7. "Fire In Your New Shoes (Extended)" - Kaskade ft. Dragonette
8. "Ghosts 'n' Stuff" - deadmau5 ft. Rob Swire
9. "Flashback (David Guetta's One Love Remix)" - Calvin Harris
10. "I'm In Love (Vocal Club Mix)" - Alex Gaudino
11. "One Life Stand" - Longo & Wainwright ft. Craig Smart
12. "Saturday (Extended Mix)" - Basshunter

Disc Two (US):

1. "Spaceship (Extended)" - Benny Benassi ft. Kelis, apl.de.ap, & Jean Baptiste
2. "Drunk Girls In The Club" - Jump Smokers
3. "It's My Birthday" - Ultimate
4. "Give Me A Sign"- Remady ft. Manu-L
5. "Escape Me (Extended)" - Tiësto ft. C. C. Sheffield
6. "Animal Rights" - Wolfgang Gartner & deadmau5
7. "Nothing But Love (Remode Version)" - Axwell ft. Errol Reid
8. "Saturday (Extended Mix)" - Basshunter
9. "Closer (Bimbo Jones Remix)" - Jes Brieden
10. "Not Giving Up On Love (Extended Version)" - Armin van Buuren vs. Sophie Ellis-Bextor
11. "Just One Day (Extended)" - Kim Sozzi
12. "Amazing" - Inna

Disc Two (Canada):

1. "2Gether (Extended)" - Roger Sanchez ft. Far East Movement
2. "Spaceship (Extended)" - Benny Benassi ft. Kelis, apl.de.ap, & Jean Baptiste
3. "Drunk Girls In The Club" - Jump Smokers
4. "My Girl (Disco Fries Remix)" - Honorebel ft. Sean Kingston, and Trina
5. "It's My Birthday" - Ultimate
6. "Nothing But Love (Remode Version)" - Axwell ft. Errol Reid
7. "Escape Me (Extended)" - Tiësto ft. C. C. Sheffield
8. "Take Over Control (Extended)" - Afrojack ft. Eva Simons
9. "Animal Rights" - Wolfgang Gartner & deadmau5
10. "Not Giving Up On Love (Extended Version)" - Armin van Buuren vs. Sophie Ellis-Bextor
11. "Just One Day (Extended)" - Kim Sozzi
12. "Amazing" - Inna
