= Shèna =

English disco and house singer (born 1977)

- Also known as: Shèna Winchester
- Born: Tracey Elizabeth McSween; 1977 (age 48–49); Reading, Berkshire, England
- Genres: Disco; nu-disco; dance-pop; techno; electro; house
- Occupations: Singer; songwriter
- Years active: 1995–present
- Label: No Prisoners

Tracey Elizabeth McSween, better known by her stage names Shèna and Shèna Winchester, (born 1977) is an English disco and house singer, known for featuring on Michael Gray's song "The Weekend".

== Early years ==
Tracey Elizabeth McSween was born into a musical family. Her father was a calypso singer in a band called the Volcanoes. She studied at the Royal Academy of Music with Joy Mammen, and graduated with honours with a Classical, Musical Theatre and Commercial Music Performer's Diploma and a Teacher's Certificate. She took the stage name Shèna and went on to begin her music career.

== Career ==
Shèna first performed in musicals like Mamma I Want to Sing, Hot Stuff, Carmen Jones and concert tours throughout the world. Developing an interest in recording, she went on to re-record vocals for other female pop singers.

Her breakthrough hit was a cover of Lisa Lisa and Cult Jam's "Let the Beat Hit 'Em, Part 2" which reached the UK top 40 in 1997, and would be used as the base for Sound De-Zign's top 20 hit "Happiness" in 2001 and which would influence the number one hit "B.O.T.A. (Baddest of Them All)" by DJ Eliza Rose and Interplanetary Criminal in 2022.

In 2008, she achieved her highest placed credited UK chart hit with the Alex Gaudino collaboration "Watch Out", though the biggest hit she actually provided the vocals for was Michael Gray's "The Weekend", a number 7 hit on the UK Singles Chart in 2004. She was the uncredited vocalist for "The Weekend" and has continued to be an in-demand session vocalist, working on a series of dance music tracks for a number of house music and EDM producers including Jake Williams, who, under the name JX, recorded the top 20 hits "There's Nothing I Won't Do" and "You Belong to Me".

== Personal life ==
Shèna has three sisters who are also singers. She married musician and record producer James David Winchester.

== Discography ==
=== Studio albums ===
- B.I.T.C.H. (2003)
- One Man Woman (2009)
- 2079 (2010)
- My Brave Face (2011)

=== Singles ===
- 1995 "You Belong to Me" (with JX)
- 1996 "There's Nothing I Won't Do" (with JX)
- 1996 "More Than Woman"
- 1997 "Close to Your Heart" (with JX)
- 1997 "Let the Beat Hit 'Em" – UK No. 28
- 1998 "Hot Stuff" (with Arsenal F.C. & Friends)
- 2000 "Dynamite (Dancehall Queen)" (with Dinamyte and Tittla)
- 2001 "I Can Cast a Spell" (under the alias 'Cloudburst' with Disco-Tex)
- 2001 "I'll Be Waiting" (with Full Intention) – UK No. 44
- 2002 "Comin' at Ya" (with Soul Avengerz)
- 2003 "Wilderness" (with Jurgen Vries) – UK No. 20
- 2003 "Turn My World" (with Skyy)
- 2004 "No More" (with Bhooka and T-Bone)
- 2004 "Dirty Little Dream" (with Per Qx)
- 2004 "Dare Me (Stupidisco)" (with Junior Jack)
- 2004 "The Weekend" (with Michael Gray)
- 2005 "Your Day Is Coming" (with Full Intention)
- 2005 "1000 Years (Just Leave Me Now)" (with Jupiter Ace)
- 2005 "Rock Me Dirty"
- 2006 "Friday Night" (with Sex Machine)
- 2006 "Do It Again" (with Disco Freaks)
- 2007 "The Real Thing" (with Cloudskippers)
- 2007 "Guilty" (with De Souza)
- 2007 "Altered State of Mind" (with Mr Groove and Vergas)
- 2007 "Still in Love" (with Notus)
- 2007 "I've Found the Love" (with Weekend Masters)
- 2007 "Let Your Mind Go" (with Starchaser)
- 2007 "Fallin'" (with Dirty High)
- 2007 "The Power of One" (with DT8 Project)
- 2007 "Lifting" (with Warren Clarke)
- 2007 "Electrosexual"
- 2008 "Watch Out" (with Alex Gaudino)
- 2008 "Fantasy" (with Solitaire)
- 2008 "Bitch Is Back" (with Warren Clarke and Jonni Black)
- 2008 "Why Did Ya" (with The BeatThiefs)
- 2008 "One Man Woman"
- 2008 "Got to Be Real" (with Groovesplitters)
- 2009 "You Got To" (with The Beatthiefs)
- 2009 "From Dusk Til Dawn" (with Ilan Tenenbaum)
- 2009 "Release the Future" (with Ilan Tenenbaum)
- 2009 "The One" (with Joyriders)
- 2009 "Touch Me" (with Simioli & Viani)
- 2009 "Can't Stop the Rain"
- 2009 "Take Me Higher" (with Jonni Black)
- 2009 "The Music" (with Jay C)
- 2009 "Won't Bring Me Down" (with Olav Basoski & Alex Van Alff)
- 2009 "Hold On" (with Mr DYF)
- 2009 "My Fantasy"
- 2009 "Nasty Little Rumour"
- 2010 "Nothing Better" (with Eddie Thoneick)
- 2010 "Mysterious" (with Knee Deep)
- 2010 "Look Don't Touch"
- 2010 "How Come You're Dancing?"
- 2010 "Everybody" (with Victor Palmez)
- 2010 "Don't Stop Me Now" (with Ilan Tenenbaum and Bimbo Jones)
- 2010 "Let the Beat Hit 'Em 2010 (with Soul Kandi Allstars)
- 2010 "Time of Our Lives" (with Deniz Koyu)
- 2011 "Take Me to the Stars" (with Nari & Milani and Christian Marchi)
- 2011 "Uplifted" (with Dave Bernardi)
- 2011 "Aphrodisiac" (with Ivan Roudyk)
- 2011 "My Brave Face"
- 2011 "I'll Be Waiting 2011" (with Full intention)
- 2011 "There's Nothing I Won't Do" (with Cyber club)
- 2011 "Higher Than the Clouds" (with Jose de Mara)
- 2011 "Homewrecka" (with Stereobrain and Sheriff)
- 2011 "Electro Sexual"
- 2011 "Alright" (with Andrew Bennett)
- 2011 "Le Freak" (with DBN and Tom Shark)
- 2011 "When Love Breaks Down" (with Darryl Green)
- 2011 "Face Control" (with DJ Shevtsov)
- 2011 "High" (with Alex Hide)
- 2012 "4ever" (with Francesco Sparacello)
