= Destination Calabria =

2006 single by Alex Gaudino

Single by Alex Gaudino featuring Crystal Waters

from the album My Destination
- Released: 2006
- Length: 6:56 (original mix); 3:03 (UK radio edit)
- Label: Rise
- Songwriters: Alessandro Fortunato Gaudino; Rune Reilly Kølsch; Stefano Scarpellini; Sharon May Linn
- Producers: Alex Gaudino; Nari & Milani

Alex Gaudino singles chronology
"Reaction" (2005)	"Destination Calabria" (2006)	"Que Pasa Contigo" (2007)

Crystal Waters singles chronology
"Lies" (2004)	"Destination Calabria" (2007)	"Dancefloor" (2008)

Alternative cover
- French cover

Music video
- "Destination Calabria" on YouTube

"Destination Calabria" is a song by Italian music producer Alex Gaudino with vocals by American singer Crystal Waters. It is the first single released from his debut album My Destination. The track is a mashup, taking the instrumental from Rune RK's "Calabria" and the vocals from Gaudino's and Waters' "Destination Unknown", both originally released in 2003. It was produced with the help of Maurizio Nari and Ronnie Milani (Nari & Milani), matching the saxophone riff from "Calabria" to Waters' voice.

In 2006, "Destination Calabria" was released in Italy as a 12-inch single by Rise Records. In the United Kingdom, a CD and 12-inch single were issued on 19 March 2007 by Data Records. The song was also successful in several other countries, including Australia, Belgium, France, Ireland, Spain, and the United Kingdom.

== Music video ==
The music video is directed by Eran "Rani" Creevy, produced by Ben Pugh for Ministry of Sound and choreographed by David Leighton. It features eight female dancers (Natasha Payne, Jessica Grist, Emma Wharton, and others) in sexualized green marching band costumes, playing various instruments in a seductive manner, and dancing inside an infinity cove. In some scenes, seemingly hundreds of the dancers are seen at once, but these are simply the original eight replicated many times using digital imagery.

Waters herself does not appear in the video, but members of the marching band lip sync her lyrics at various points.

== Track listings ==
Italian 12-inch single (2006)

A1. "Destination Calabria" (original extended mix) – 6:56
A2. "Destination Calabria" (Nari & Milani club mix) – 6:43
B1. "Destination Calabria" (Gaudino & Rooney remix) – 8:06

Italian 12-inch single (2007)

A1. "Destination Calabria" (UK extended mix) – 6:52
A2. "Destination Calabria" (Paul Emanuel remix) – 7:40
B1. "Destination Calabria" (King Unique remix) – 6:47
B2. "Destination Calabria" (Laidback Luke remix) – 7:16

UK CD single

1. "Destination Calabria" (radio edit)
2. "Destination Calabria" (club mix)

Dutch CD single

1. "Destination Calabria" (radio edit) – 3:02
2. "Destination Calabria" (Nari & Milani club mix) – 6:43
3. "Destination Calabria" (Laidback Luke remix) – 7:16
4. "Destination Calabria" (Drunkenmunky 2007 remake) – 6:31

Australian maxi-CD single

1. "Destination Calabria" (radio edit)
2. "Destination Calabria" (club mix)
3. "Destination Calabria" (Paul Emanuel remix)
4. "Destination Calabria" (Laidback Luke remix)
5. "Destination Calabria" (Drunkenmunky 2007 remake)

Australian digital download

1. "Destination Calabria" (radio edit) – 3:03
2. "Destination Calabria" (King Unique remix) – 6:43
3. "Destination Calabria" (Static Shokx remix) – 6:08

New Zealand digital EP

1. "Destination Calabria" (radio edit) – 3:01
2. "Destination Calabria" (club mix) – 6:32
3. "Destination Calabria" (Laidback Luke remix) – 7:18
4. "Destination Calabria" (Wharton & Lloyd remix) – 9:17

== Chart performance ==
"Destination Calabria" entered the UK Singles Chart at No. 18 on 18 March 2007 on downloads alone and eventually peaked at No. 4. It also reached No. 1 on the UK Dance Chart, No. 3 on the Australian ARIA Singles Chart, and No. 2 on the Irish Singles Chart.

=== Weekly charts ===
Chart (2007)	Peak position
Australia (ARIA)	3
Austria (Ö3 Austria Top 40)	55
Belgium (Ultratop 50 Flanders)	2
Belgium (Ultratop 50 Wallonia)	2
CIS Airplay (TopHit)	3
Czech Republic Airplay (ČNS IFPI)	9
Europe (Eurochart Hot 100)	5
Finland (Suomen virallinen lista)	8
France (SNEP)	6
Germany (GfK)	30
Hungary (Rádiós Top 40)	5
Hungary (Dance Top 40)	2
Ireland (IRMA)	2
Netherlands (Dutch Top 40)	16
Netherlands (Single Top 100)	14
New Zealand (Recorded Music NZ)	35
Poland (Polish Airplay Charts)	4
Romania (Romanian Top 100)	6
Russia Airplay (TopHit)	2
Scottish Singles Sales (Official Charts)	3
Slovakia Airplay (ČNS IFPI)	31
Spain (Promusicae)	6
Sweden (Sverigetopplistan)	10
Switzerland (Schweizer Hitparade)	50
UK Singles (Official Charts)	4
UK Dance (Official Charts)	1
Ukraine Airplay (TopHit)	38

Chart (2025)	Peak position
Moldova Airplay (TopHit)	42

=== Monthly charts ===
Chart (2025)	Peak position
Moldova Airplay (TopHit)	95

=== Year-end charts ===
Chart (2007)	Position
Australia (ARIA)	17
Belgium (Ultratop 50 Flanders)	12
Belgium (Ultratop 50 Wallonia)	8
CIS Airplay (TopHit)	3
Europe (Eurochart Hot 100)	34
France (SNEP)	35
Hungary (Rádiós Top 40)	25
Hungary (Dance Top 40)	2
Netherlands (Dutch Top 40)	64
Netherlands (Single Top 100)	57
Romania (Romanian Top 100)	11
Russia Airplay (TopHit)	3
Sweden (Sverigetopplistan)	84
UK Singles (OCC)	39

Chart (2008)	Position
Hungary (Dance Top 40)	100

=== Decade-end charts ===
Chart (2000–2009)	Position
CIS Airplay (TopHit)	26
Russia Airplay (TopHit)	19

== Certifications ==
Region	Certification	Certified units/sales
Australia (ARIA)	Platinum	70,000^{^}
Belgium (BRMA)	Gold	25,000^{*}
Denmark (IFPI Danmark)	Gold	45,000^{‡}
Italy (FIMI) sales since 2009	Gold	50,000^{‡}
New Zealand (RMNZ)	Platinum	30,000^{‡}
Spain (Promusicae)	Platinum	20,000^{*}
United Kingdom (BPI)	Platinum	600,000^{‡}
^{*} Sales figures based on certification alone.^{^} Shipments figures based on certification alone.^{‡} Sales+streaming figures based on certification alone.

== Release history ==
Region	Date	Format(s)	Label(s)	Ref.
Italy	2006	12-inch vinyl	Rise	
United Kingdom	19 March 2007	12-inch vinyl; CD	Data; TIME; Rise; Ministry of Sound	
Australia	4 June 2007	CD	Ministry of Sound	
