= Fantastic Four (2015 soundtrack) =

Fantastic Four (Original Motion Picture Soundtrack)

Film score by Marco Beltrami and Philip Glass
- Released: August 7, 2015
- Studios: Newman Scoring Stage, 20th Century Fox Studios, Los Angeles
- Genre: Film score
- Length: 1:14:45
- Labels: Sony Classical; Fox Music
- Producers: Marco Beltrami; Philip Glass; Miles Hankins; Brandon Roberts; Marcus Trumpp; Buck Sanders

Marco Beltrami chronology
Hitman: Agent 47 (2015)	Fantastic Four (2015)	True Story (2015)

Philip Glass chronology
Visitors (2013)	Fantastic Four (2015)	Jane (2017)

Fantastic Four (Original Motion Picture Soundtrack) (Note: Also marketed in digital platforms as The Fantastic Four (Original Motion Picture Soundtrack), and in physical formats as Fantastic 4 and FANT4STIC) is the soundtrack album to the 2015 film Fantastic Four. Directed by Josh Trank, the film is based on the Marvel Comics superhero team of the same name, and is a reboot of the Fantastic Four film franchise.

The musical score is composed by Marco Beltrami and Philip Glass, and the album was released in digital and physical formats on August 7, 2015 by Sony Classical Records and Fox Music, coinciding the film's release. It was also released in two-disc vinyl sets on August 10. Apart from featuring Beltrami and Glass' score, it also featured an original song "Another Body" performed by El-P and a single "Fantastic" performed by RM and Mandy Ventrice. The latter was only used for promotional purposes for the South Korean theatrical release, and is not featured in the film or the soundtrack.

== Development ==
In January 2015, Marco Beltrami was hired to compose the film's score and later that month, veteran composer Philip Glass was also hired to work on the score. Miles Hankins, Brandon Roberts, Marcus Trumpp and Buck Sanders provided additional music for the film. American hip-hop recording artist El-P scored the end credits of the film.

Beltrami attended the 2015 San Diego Comic-Con held in July 2015, to discuss scoring the film. He described the score as "eerie" and "mysterious", landing it in a "musical territory leaning towards fantasy." A musical piece from the prelude was scored by Glass, from which Beltrami had adapted several of its cues from the film's music. Beltrami had opined that the score will be "darker" than that of the previous Fantastic Four film scores (composed by John Ottman) and he added that "the most important goal was to capture the innocence and curiosity of the kids who get exposed to interstellar radiation and become superheroes". He did not create individual themes for the film, but instead had created individual elements that come together.

== Promotional singles ==
On July 24, 2015, El-P announced the promotional single titled "Another Body" for the film, and was later released during the live performance of his band Run the Jewels at the Beats 1 show on July 25. The song was later featured as a bonus track in the digital streaming releases of the album. To promote the film, Kim Nam-joon, known as RM of the K-pop group BTS, and American recording artist Mandy Ventrice, worked on the digital single "Fantastic", which was released alongside the South Korean run of the film. The accompanying music video was released on August 3.

== Reception ==
In spite of the film's extremely negative reception, the soundtrack still garnered a positive response. Jørn Tillnes of Soundtrack Geek gave a 57 percent score to the album saying "If you’re looking for another Marvel superhero score to match the latest trend, then you’ll find some of it here." Mihnea Manduteanu of Soundtrack Dreams gave 80/100 to the score and praised Glass' co-contribution to the score, while opining that Beltrami's efforts are lost in the film. Robert Trate of Sci-Fi Movie Page called it as an "amazing collection of music that should be listened to while reading a Fantastic Four comic". Brian Lowry, writing for Variety, had opined that Beltrami and Glass "yields some intriguing riffs in what ultimately sounds like a pretty conventional score".

James Southall of Movie Wave wrote: "The opening and particularly the closing parts of the album are strong, thoroughly entertaining and impressive. The Philip Glass bits – which disappear almost completely the closer the score gets to its conclusion – do add a bit of curiosity value, but to be honest no more than that. The star of the show is Marco Beltrami’s action music towards the end." Filmtracks.com wrote: "The entirety of the score is interesting in parts but extremely underachieving given its original potential. It goes without saying that nothing from John Ottman's prior music for the franchise survives here, except for the concept's inability to escape from rather mediocre filler music outside of its blatant thematic expressions. It's an adequate but disengaged endeavor."

== Track listing ==
No.	Title	Writer(s)	Artist	Length
1.	"Fantastic Four Prelude"	Marco Beltrami; Philip Glass		5:16
2.	"The Garage"	Beltrami; Glass; Buck Sanders		2:26
3.	"The Unveiling"	Beltrami; Brandon Roberts		1:03
4.	"Baxter"	Beltrami; Sanders		2:45
5.	"'All My Faith'"	Beltrami; Miles Hankins		0:45
6.	"The Lab"	Beltrami; Glass		0:53
7.	"Meeting of the Minds"	Beltrami; Hankins		0:53
8.	"It Begins"	Beltrami; Hankins		0:34
9.	"Building the Future"	Beltrami; Roberts		2:49
10.	"Launch One"	Beltrami; Hankins		3:11
11.	"Neil Armstrong"	Beltrami; Hankins		2:57
12.	"Maiden Voyage"	Beltrami; Hankins		1:56
13.	"Footprints"	Beltrami; Hankins		4:00
14.	"'Run'"	Beltrami; Marcus Trumpp		2:38
15.	"Ben's Drop"	Beltrami; Hankins		2:27
16.	"Real World Applications"	Beltrami; Hankins		1:39
17.	"Under Pressure"	Beltrami; Hankins		1:01
18.	"The Search"	Beltrami; Trumpp		1:58
19.	"'You're Going to Like This One'"	Beltrami; Hankins		1:10
20.	"Father and Son"	Beltrami; Hankins		1:49
21.	"Return"	Beltrami; Sanders		2:42
22.	"He's Awake"	Beltrami; Roberts; Sanders; Trumpp		6:55
23.	"Pursuit"	Beltrami; Hankins		3:01
24.	"Strength in Numbers"	Beltrami; Trumpp		5:17
25.	"End Titles"	Beltrami; Roberts		6:15
26.	"Another Body" (Digital bonus track)	Beltrami; Glass; Jaime Meline; Torbitt Schwartz	El-P	5:30
27.	"Fantastic" (Japanese version)	Beltrami; Kim Nam-joon; Mandy Ventrice	Nam-joon	3:44

== Chart performance ==
Chart (2015)	Peak position
UK Soundtrack Albums (OCC)	46
US Billboard 200	191
US Soundtrack Albums (Billboard)	25

== Personnel ==
Credits adapted from CD liner notes

Production

- Music by – Marco Beltrami, Philip Glass
- Additional music – Brandon Roberts, Marcus Trumpp, Miles Hankins, Buck Sanders
- Recording – Vincent Cirrilli, John Kurlander
- Mixing – Tyson Lozensky, John Kurlander
- Mastering – Erick Labson

Musicians

- Bass – Bart Samolis, David Parmeter, Drew Dembowski, Edward Meares, Michael Valerio, Nico Abondolo, Stephen Dress
- Bassoon – Ken Munday, Rose Corrigan
- Cello – Andrew Shulman, Armen Ksajikian, Cecilia Tsan, Dennis Karmazyn, Evgeny Tonkha, Paula Hochhalter, Steve Erdody, Timothy Landauer, Xiaodan Zheng
- Clarinet – Gary Bovyer, Ralph Williams
- Flute – Geri Rotella, Jennifer Olson, Sara Andon
- French horn – Benjamin Jaber, Daniel Kelley, David Everson, Jenny L. Kim, Laura Brenes, Mark Adams, Steven Becknell
- Harp – Marcia Dickstein
- Oboe – Leslie Reed, Phil Ayling
- Percussion – Alan Estes, Gregory Goodall, Marvin Gordy III, Wade Culbreath
- Piano – Bryan Pezzone
- Trombone – Alan Kaplan, Alexander Iles, William Reichenbach, William Booth
- Trumpet – Barry Perkins, Christopher Still, David Washburn, Jon Lewis
- Tuba – Doug Tornquist
- Viola – Alma Fernandez, Andrew Duckles, Brian Dembow, David Walther, Luke Maurer, Maria Newman, Matthew Funes, Michael Nowak, Robert Brophy, Scott Hosfeld, Shawn Mann, Victoria Miskolczy
- Violin – Alyssa Park, Bruce Dukov, Charlie Bisharat, Darius Campo, Elizabeth Hedman, Grace Oh, Helen Nightengale, Irina Voloshina, Jessica Guideri, Josefina Vergara, Julie Gigante, Katia Popov, Kevin Connolly, Lisa Liu, Lisa Sutton, Natalie Leggett, Neil Samples, Phillip Levy, Rafael Rishik, Roberto Cani, Roger Wilkie, Sandra Cameron, Sarah Thornblade, Serena McKinney, Shalini Vijayan, Songa Lee, Steven Zander, Tamara Hatwan, Tereza Stanislav

Orchestra

- Orchestra conductor – Pete Anthony
- Orchestra contractor – Peter Rotter
- Orchestrator – Andrew Kinney, Dana Niu, Jon Kull, Mark Graham (3), Pete Anthony, Richard Bronskill, Rossano Galante
- Concertmistress – Belinda Broughton
- Stage engineer – Denis St. Amand
- Stage Manager – Damon Tedesco, Tom Steel
