= Watch Out (Alex Gaudino song) =

2008 single by Alex Gaudino

Single by Alex Gaudino featuring Shèna

from the album My Destination
- Released: 28 January 2008
- Length: 2:58 (UK radio edit)
- Label: Rise
- Songwriters: Chip Carpenter; James Johnstone; Simon Underwood; Chris Lee; Roger Freeman; Ollie Moore; Chris Hamlin
- Producer: Alex Gaudino

Alex Gaudino singles chronology
"Que Pasa Contigo" (2007)	"Watch Out" (2008)	"I Love Rock 'n' Roll" (2008)

Shèna singles chronology
"Electrosexual" (2007)	"Watch Out" (2008)	"Fantasy" (2008)

"Watch Out" is a single by Alex Gaudino featuring Shèna, released on 28 January 2008. It is the third single released from his debut album My Destination. The second release topically coincided with UEFA Euro 2008, as the music video features a "video-game" football match played by raunchy women in spandex shorts/tops. The song contains a SCORCCiO replayed sample of Pigbag's "Papa's Got a Brand New Pigbag", produced by Mark Summers while Shèna's vocals play a considerable part in track.

== Music video ==
The music video starts with Alex Gaudino and his friend playing a virtual game of football (soccer) on an unknown video game console. The two men select a player type (all are female); Gaudino chooses blue tops and his friend plays Team Diablo in white tops, and they play in the Gaudino Arena. The game starts with a shot between one of the player's legs and doors then open behind her. They enter the arena wearing tight Lycra tops and shorts which are both short and revealing. The two teams start doing exercises including star jumps, stretching and bending of the legs, with some angles showing close-ups of buttocks and cleavage. The game eventually kicks off. Team Gaudino scores a goal, and later tackles team Diablo causing one girl to trip. A nurse is called out by the referee and she uses a "magic sponge" which miraculously heals the bruise. The play continues and team Diablo scores a goal. A player from team Gaudino then pulls on the shorts of a Diablo player, which causes the referee to give Gaudino a foul and Diablo gets a free kick. Team Diablo scores another goal and the game ends. Diablo then shakes hands with Alex Gaudino at the end of the video. The soccer players are played by Amy Perfect and Sophie Burles.

== Track listings ==
- 12-inch maxi (Rise)
1. Watch Out (Extended Mix) – 7:14
2. Watch Out (Jason Rooney Remix) – 7:41
3. Watch Out (Nari & Milani Remix) – 6:47
4. Watch Out (Robbie Rivera Remix) – 7:18
- CD-maxi (Ministry Of Sound)
1. Watch Out (Radio Edit) – 2:59
2. Watch Out (Extended Mix) – 7:16
3. Watch Out (Nari & Milani Remix) – 6:49
4. Watch Out (Jason Rooney Remix) – 7:41
- CD-single (Spinnin')
1. Watch Out (UK Radio Edit) – 2:56
2. Watch Out (Mac Project Remix) – 6:24
3. Watch Out (Nari & Milani Remix) – 6:47
4. Watch Out (Robbie Rivera Remix) – 7:19
5. Watch Out (UK Club Mix) – 7:12

== Credits and personnel ==
- Lead vocals – Tracey Elizabeth McSween, a.k.a. Shèna
- Lyrics – Jerma (uncredited), Chip Carpenter, James Johnstone, Simon Underwood, Chris Lee, Roger Freeman, Ollie Moore, Chris Hamlin
- Producer – Alex Gaudino

== Charts ==
=== Weekly charts ===
Chart (2007–2008)	Peak position
Australia (ARIA)	118
Belgium (Ultratip Bubbling Under Flanders)	2
Belgium (Ultratip Bubbling Under Wallonia)	9
CIS Airplay (TopHit)	6
Czech Republic Airplay (ČNS IFPI)	22
Finland Download (Latauslista)	24
Hungary (Dance Top 40)	10
Hungary (Editors' Choice Top 40)	27
Hungary (Single Top 40)	5
Ireland (IRMA)	23
Italy (FIMI)	12
Netherlands (Dutch Top 40)	9
Netherlands (Single Top 100)	12
Romania (Romanian Top 100)	19
Russia Airplay (TopHit)	4
Scottish Singles Sales (Official Charts)	10
Slovakia Airplay (ČNS IFPI)	43
Ukraine Airplay (TopHit)	17
UK Singles (Official Charts)	16
UK Dance (Official Charts)	2

=== Year-end charts ===
Chart (2008)	Position
CIS Airplay (TopHit)	36
Netherlands (Dutch Top 40)	71
Russia Airplay (TopHit)	30
Ukraine Airplay (TopHit)	117

=== Decade-end charts ===
Chart (2000–2009)	Position
Russia Airplay (TopHit)	81
