= Mandy Ventrice =

American singer-songwriter (born 1985)

- Born: Amanda Nicole Ventrice; September 12, 1985 (age 40)
- Origin: California
- Genres: Pop
- Occupations: Singer, songwriter, producer
- Instrument: Vocals
- Years active: 1999-Present
- Website: Official website

Amanda Nicole Ventrice (born September 12, 1985), better known by her stage name Mandy Ventrice, is an American singer, songwriter, and record producer.

Born in the Bay Area, Mandy Ventrice began her music career at a very early age; writing her first song at the age of seven, and completing her first CD independently by the age of thirteen. Soon after, Ventrice joined a female pop group based out of Boston, called Poetry In Motion. In 2002, the pop group dispersed and Mandy launched new solo efforts, working with the likes of Shep Goodman & Kenny Gioia, Aaron Accetta, Carl Sturken & Evan Rogers, and Sam Hollander.

After moving to New York in 2004, Mandy began performing with rock trio, Lights Resolve; touring with The Used, Shiny Toy Guns, and Panic! at the Disco; and performing at major music festivals, including The Bamboozle and CMJ.

In 2010, she released her first dance/pop single with American house DJ and multi-platinum recording artist Ian Carey. After the song and video's massive exposure, reaching over 1.6 million views on YouTube, she released a single with one of Germany's top DJ duos, Michael Mind Project. The single charted on top 40 radio and the DJ dance charts in Europe. In the midst of her overseas success, Mandy moved back to California and worked with hip-hop producer Just Blaze on a new track for Eminem’s highly anticipated studio album, Recovery. She performed the lead vocal on the track’s hook, but the song wasn’t completed in time for the official release of the album in June 2010. Less than one month later, Mandy performed sample vocals on a Kanye West production for Rick Ross’ single, "Live Fast Die Young," off Ross' fourth studio album, Teflon Don. She also performed background vocals for R&B legend Charlie Wilson on his number one single, “You Are,” and on the massively successful Watch The Throne album with Jay-Z and Kanye West.

In January 2013, Mandy moved to Los Angeles to focus more on her career in songwriting. She began co-writing with some of the industry's top writers and producers such as, Julia Michaels, Chris Sernel, Breyan Isaac, and Kevin Kadish. She has songs featured in major motion pictures such as Jackass Presents: Bad Grandpa, and prime time television shows such as ABC's The Mindy Project, as well as MTV's Teen Mom and Jersey Shore. In December 2013, she inked her first major publishing deal with Atlantic Records and Warner/Chappell Music.

Mandy currently lives in the Bay Area, where she continues to write for major and independent artists, as well as for the TV/film industry.

== Collaborations ==
Year	Album	Singles
2008	Currency - Lights Resolve: Featured on "Lost & Jaded"; track 2 of the album; Second EP for Alternative Rock band, Lights Resolve; Release Date: April 2, 2008	"Lost & Jaded"
2008	Hello World - Hello Kitty: Featured vocalist on "Be Yourself"; track 3 of the album; The first full-length musical album for the Hello Kitty franchise; Release Date: October 7, 2008; Label: Lakeshore Records	"Be Yourself"
2010	Let Loose - Ian Carey Featuring Mandy Ventrice: Featured vocalist for dance/house DJ, Ian Carey; Release Date: June 1, 2010; Label: Spinnin Records	"Let Loose"
2010	Love - Exes of Evil: Featured on "Cheater Cheater"; track 2 of the album; First record release for pop band, Exes of Evil; Release Date: June 15, 2010	"Cheater Cheater"
2010	Teflon Don - Rick Ross: Performed sample/background vocals on "Live Fast Die Young"; track 5 of the album; Produced by Kanye West; Release Date: July 20, 2010; Label: The Island Def Jam Music Group	"Live Fast Die Young" Featuring Kanye West
2010	Forever - Kindervater: Featured vocalist on Lovephobia, track 7 of the album; Release Date: September 16, 2010; Label: YAWA Recordings	"Lovephobia"
2010	The Annual 2011 - Ministry of Sound: Featured vocalist on Let Loose, by Ian Carey, track 8, disc 1; Release Date: November 9, 2010; Label: Ministry of Sound America	"Let Loose" Club Mix
2010	Delirious EP - Michael Mind Project Featuring Mandy Ventrice & Carlprit: Featured vocalist; Release Date: November 19, 2010; Label: Track by Track Records	"Delirious"
2011	909s & Valentines EP - Exes Of Evil: Performed sample/background vocals on "Ahh" and "Crazy"; tracks 1 and 2 of the album; Release Date: February 14, 2011; Label: EXOE Music	"Ahh"; "Crazy"
2011	Dance With Me EP - Riz Featuring Pitbull: Performed background vocals; Release Date: April 3, 2011; Label: iRIZistible Music/Starkid Inc.	"Dance With Me"
2011	Knight Rider - Tito Deville Band Featuring Mandy Ventrice: Featured vocalist; Release Date: July 24, 2011; Label: Tito Deville Band	"Knight Rider"
2011	Watch the Throne - Jay-Z & Kanye West: Performed sample/background vocals on "Why I Love You" featuring Mr. Hudson; track 12 of the album; Release Date: August 12, 2011; Label: Roc-A-Fella Records	"Why I Love You"
2011	November Skies (11-11-11) (single) - Lea: Composed & Performed background vocals; Release Date: October 13, 2011; Label: G-Note Records	"November Skies (11-11-11)"
2012	Psychopath (single) - Fred Pellichero Featuring Mandy Ventrice: Composer/Vocal Producer; Featured Vocalist; Release Date: April 17, 2012; Label: Dipiu S.r.l.	"Psychopath"
2012	Midnight Hymns - Neon Parade: Composer/Vocal Producer; Featured Vocalist; Release Date: October 23, 2012; Label: Soundfile Records	Whole Album
2013	Human (single) - Dim Chris Featuring Mandy Ventrice: Composer/Vocal Producer; Featured Vocalist; Release Date: March 4, 2013; Label: DJ Center Records	"Human"
2013	Doctor Love - Alex Gaudino: Vocal Producer; Featured vocalist on "Your Love Gets Me High"; track 7 of the album; Release Date: March 12, 2013; Label: Ultra Records	"Your Love Gets Me High"
2013	Take The House (single) - D.One Featuring Mandy Ventrice & Bubba Sparxxx: Vocal Producer; Featured Vocalist; Co-writer; Release Date: July 23, 2013; Label: Upscale Records	"Take The House"
2014	Reckless (single) - Mossamo Featuring Mandy Ventrice: Vocal Producer; Featured Vocalist; Co-writer; Release Date: June 30, 2014; Label: Mossamo	"Reckless"
2014	Cholo Soul - Los Stellarians: Performed sample/background vocals on "Be That Way"; track 3 of the album; Release Date: August 26, 2014; Label: Holy Grailien	"Be That Way"
2014	Carbon Copy (single) - Glassesboys Featuring Snoop Dogg and Mandy Ventrice: Vocal Producer; Featured Vocalist; Release Date: December 1, 2014; Label: My Music	"Carbon Copy"
2015	Turn off the Light - EP - Fred Pellichero Featuring Mandy Ventrice: Composer/Vocal Producer; Featured Vocalist; Co-writer; Release Date: June 8, 2015; Label: Roster Music under exclusive license from Scratchin Records	"Turn off the Light"
2015	Fantastic - Single - RM Featuring Mandy Ventrice: Featured Vocalist; Release Date: August 4, 2015; Label: Big Hit Entertainment	"Fantastic"

== Songwriting discography ==
Year	Artist	Album	Song	Co-written with
2009	Brooke Hogan	The Redemption	"You'll Never Be Like Him"	Aaron Accetta
2011	Cory Lee Featuring Shaggy	Best Shot (single)	"Best Shot"	Jenson Vaughan, Cory Lee, Shaggy
2011	Emily Vasquez	Slow Motion (single)	"Slow Motion"	Mack Mckinney
2012	diMaro & Rosette	Ready For Tonight EP	"Ready For Tonight"	Jenson Vaughan, Rudi Schwamborn, Mario Willems, Sammy Merayah
2012	Fred Pellichero Featuring Mandy Ventrice	Psychopath (single)	"Psychopath"	Fred Pellichero
2013	Dim Chris Featuring Mandy Ventrice	Human EP	"Human"	Dimitri Schoenfeld
2013	Skye Daru	Skye Daru EP	"DNA"	Chris Sernel
2013	D.One Featuring Mandy Ventrice & Bubba Sparxxx	Take The House (single)	"Take The House"	D.One, Bubba Sparxxx, Manny Mijares, Anthony Meyer
2013	Liz-D & Glassesboys	Off With Your Heads (single)	"Off With Your Heads"	Manny Mijares
