= Close to Your Heart (JX song) =

Single by JX featuring Shèna
- B-side: "Remix"
- Released: 24 February 1997
- Genre: Eurodance; trance
- Length: 4:20
- Label: Ffrreedom; Hooj Choons
- Songwriter: JX
- Producer: JX

JX featuring Shèna singles chronology
"There's Nothing I Won't Do" (1996)	"Close to Your Heart" (1997)	"Restless" (2004)

Music video
- "Close to Your Heart" on YouTube

"Close to Your Heart" is the fourth single released by British dance music producer Jake Williams under the name JX, featuring vocals by singer Shèna (a.k.a. Shèna Winchester). It was released in February 1997 by Ffrreedom and Hooj Choons as a single only, peaking at number nine in Scotland and number 18 in the UK, as well as number one on the UK Dance Chart and number 53 on the Eurochart Hot 100. Outside Europe, the song charted in Israel and Australia, peaking at numbers three and 90, respectively.

== Critical reception ==
Juha Soininen noted in his 2020 book Move Your Body (2 The 90's): Unlimited Eurodance that "Close to Your Heart" "was a step to a more trancier sound."

== Track listing ==
- 12", UK & Europe
1. "Close to Your Heart" (JX Original Mix)
2. "Close to Your Heart" (JX Dub)
3. "Close to Your Heart" (The Immortals Remix)
- CD single, UK
1. "Close to Your Heart" (Original Edit) — 4:19
2. "Close to Your Heart" (JX Original Mix) — 9:12
3. "Close to Your Heart" (The Immortals Remix) — 12:12
4. "Close to Your Heart" (JX Dub) — 8:44
- CD maxi, Europe
1. "Close to Your Heart" (Original Edit) — 4:20
2. "Close to Your Heart" (Original Mix) — 9:10
3. "Close to Your Heart" (The Immortals Remix) — 11:16

== Charts ==
Chart (1997)	Peak position
Australia (ARIA)	90
Europe (Eurochart Hot 100)	53
Israel (Israeli Singles Chart)	3
Scotland (OCC)	9
UK Singles (OCC)	18
UK Dance (OCC)	1
