= There's Nothing I Won't Do =

1996 single by JX

Single by JX
- Released: 6 May 1996
- Genre: Eurodance
- Length: 4:30
- Label: Ffrreedom; Hooj Choons
- Songwriter: JX
- Producer: JX

JX singles chronology
| "You Belong to Me" (1995) | "There's Nothing I Won't Do" (1996) | "Close to Your Heart" (1997) |

Music video
- "There's Nothing I Won't Do" on YouTube

"There's Nothing I Won't Do" is a song by British electronic music producer Jake Williams under the name JX. It was released in May 1996, by Ffrreedom and Hooj Choons, as his third single. The song is both written and produced by JX and reached number four in the United Kingdom, where it is his highest-charting single. It also reached number seven in Israel, number 14 in Ireland and number 26 in Australia. The accompanying music video was directed by Alex Hemming.

== Critical reception ==
Richard Smith from Melody Maker named it one of the Singles of the Week and "so damned good." He wrote, "'There's Nothing I Won't Do' isn't quite up there with 'Son of a Gun' or 'You Belong to Me', but it still wees all over the rest of the records released this week. Here, little Jake, Camberwell's finest teenage bedroom boffin, pulls out all the stops on his Roland thingamabob to make a record so pent up and furious it sounds like it could spontaneously combust at any moment. And then he goes and gets a big black woman to shout nonsense on top of it over and over again. Which is fine by me." James Hamilton from Music Week's RM Dance Update described it as a "grandiose swirly anthemic Euro-ish galloper". Retrospectively, Dave Fawbert from ShortList called it "an absolutely awesome slice of mid-'90s dance in a thoroughly N-Trance style. God it's brilliant."

== Track listing ==
- UK CD single
1. "There's Nothing I Won't Do" (original edit)
2. "There's Nothing I Won't Do" (JX original mix)
3. "There's Nothing I Won't Do" (Red Jerry & JX dub)
4. "There's Nothing I Won't Do" (Carl Cox Full House remix)
5. "There's Nothing I Won't Do" (Way Out West remix)

== Charts ==
=== Weekly charts ===
| Chart (1996) | Peak position |
|---|---|
| Australia (ARIA) | 26 |
| Europe (Eurochart Hot 100) | 15 |
| Europe (European Dance Radio) | 17 |
| Ireland (IRMA) | 14 |
| Israel (Israeli Singles Chart) | 7 |
| Scottish Singles Sales (Official Charts) | 2 |
| UK Singles (Official Charts) | 4 |
| UK Dance (Official Charts) | 1 |
| UK Airplay (Music Week) | 12 |
| UK Club Chart (Music Week) | 14 |
| UK Pop Tip Club Chart (Music Week) | 9 |

=== Year-end charts ===
| Chart (1996) | Position |
|---|---|
| Australia (ARIA) | 89 |
| UK Singles (OCC) | 43 |
| UK Pop Tip Club Chart (Music Week) | 20 |

== Certifications ==
| Region | Certification | Certified units/sales |
|---|---|---|
| United Kingdom (BPI) Sales since 2012 | Platinum | 600,000^{‡} |
^{‡} Sales+streaming figures based on certification alone.
