= Playing with My Heart =

"Playing With My Heart"

Single by Alex Gaudino featuring JRDN

from the album Doctor Love
- Released: 28 January 2013
- Recorded: 2012
- Genre: Dance
- Length: 3:05
- Label: Ultra Records
- Songwriter(s): Jenson Vaughan, Jason Derulo, Alfonso Fortunato Gaudino, Giuseppe D'Albenzio

Alex Gaudino singles chronology
| "I Don't Wanna Dance" (2012) | "Playing With My Heart" (2013) | "Is This Love" (2013) |

JRDN singles chronology
| "The One" (2012) | "Playing With My Heart" (2013) | "Live My Dream" (2013) |

"Playing With My Heart" is a song by Italian DJ Alex Gaudino, taken from his second studio album Doctor Love (2013). The song was released from 28 January 2013 by Ultra Records. The song was written by Jenson Vaughan, Jason Derulo, Alex Fortunato Gaudino and Giuseppe D'Albenzio. The song features vocals from Canadian R&B recording artist JRDN.

== Music video ==
A music video to accompany the release of "Playing With My Heart" was first released onto YouTube on March 13, 2013 at a total length of three minutes and seventeen seconds.

== Track listing ==
Digital download
| No. | Title | Length |
|---|---|---|
| 1. | "Playing With My Heart" (Radio Edit) | 3:05 |
| 2. | "Playing With My Heart" (Original Mix) | 8:00 |
| 3. | "Playing With My Heart" (Simon De Jano Remix) | 5:03 |
| 4. | "Playing With My Heart" (Bottai Remix) | 6:14 |
| 5. | "Playing With My Heart" (Louis Rondina Remix) | 6:01 |

== Chart performance ==
=== Weekly charts ===
| Chart (2012) | Peak position |
|---|---|
| Belgium (Ultratip Bubbling Under Flanders) | 52 |
| Belgium (Ultratip Bubbling Under Wallonia) | 11 |

== Release history ==
| Region | Date | Format | Label |
|---|---|---|---|
| Belgium | 28 January 2013 | Digital download | Ultra Records |
