= IAMJRDN =

Studio album by JRDN
- Released: (Canada) November 9, 2010
- Recorded: 2009–2010
- Genre: Pop, R&B
- Label: Kuya Productions Inc., Fontana North

IAMJRDN is the official debut studio album by Canadian R&B singer JRDN. The album features the hit singles, "U Can Have It All" and "Like Magic", which peaked at #20 and #24 on the Canadian Hot 100 respectively. It was released on November 9, 2010.

== Track listing ==
#	Song title	Time
01	"The One"	3:07
02	"Come Come"	3:14
03	"U Can Have It All"	3:12
04	"HD"	3:42
05	"4 Tha Ghetto"	4:27
06	"Like Magic"	3:41
07	"I Don't Care"	3:42
08	"All We Need" ft. Melanie Fiona	4:11
09	"Forever And A Day"	3:36
10	"Mirror"	3:11
11	"Top It All"	4:11
12	"Crazy"	3:56
13	"Cross The Line"	2:56
14	"U Can Have It All (Harper & Brother Remix)"	3:42

== Charts ==
Chart (2010)	Peak position
Canadian R&B Albums Chart	13
