= You Belong to Me (JX song) =

1995 single by JX

Single by JX
- Released: March 1995
- Genre: Techno pop
- Length: 4:03
- Label: Hooj Choons
- Songwriter: JX
- Producers: JX; Red Jerry

JX singles chronology
"Son of a Gun" (1994)	"You Belong to Me" (1995)	"There's Nothing I Won't Do" (1996)

"You Belong to Me" is a song by British dance DJ Jake Williams, performed under the name JX. Featuring vocals from English singer Shèna, it was released as a single in March 1995 by label Hooj Choons and reached number 17 in the United Kingdom, number one in Spain, and number 11 in the Netherlands. Outside Europe, "You Belong to Me" peaked at number four in Australia and number five in Israel. A black-and-white music video was produced to promote the single.

== Critical reception ==
British magazine Music Week wrote, "A Euro-pop/techno tune boasting the same furious breakbeats as predecessor 'Son of a Gun' but without the force to propel it quite as high in the charts." Iestyn George from NME noted its "nose-bleeding rhythms", "stabbing synth-patterns" and "jarring vocals", adding that the song "is the sort of relentless Eurotrash custom-made to cause mayhem in Scotland (home of the rave) and send the rest of us scuttling for the Anderson shelters."

== Track listing ==
- CD maxi – Europe
1. "You Belong to Me" (JX/Red Jerry edit) – 4:03
2. "You Belong to Me" (JX/Red Jerry mix) – 7:25
3. "You Belong to Me" (No Respect remix) – 6:21
4. "You Belong to Me" (Sil remix) – 6:25

== Charts ==
=== Weekly charts ===
Chart (1995)	Peak position
Australia (ARIA)	4
Europe (Eurochart Hot 100)	25
Ireland (IRMA)	15
Israel (Israeli Singles Chart)	5
Netherlands (Dutch Top 40)	11
Netherlands (Single Top 100)	15
Scottish Singles Sales (Official Charts)	15
Spain (AFYVE)	1
UK Singles (Official Charts)	17
UK Dance (Official Charts)	3
UK Club Chart (Music Week)	11
UK Pop Tip Club Chart (Music Week)	5

=== Year-end charts ===
Chart (1995)	Position
Australia (ARIA)	27
Netherlands (Dutch Top 40)	114
UK Pop Tip Club Chart (Music Week)	23
