= Que Pasa Contigo =

Single by Alex Gaudino featuring Sam Obernik

from the album My Destination
- Released: 12 July 2007
- Genre: Dance, Electro
- Length: 8:52
- Label: Spinnin' Records
- Songwriters: Alex Gaudino, Jerma, Sam Obernik, Maurizio Zoffoli
- Producers: Alex Gaudino, Jerma

Alex Gaudino singles chronology
"Destination Calabria" (2007)	"Que Pasa Contigo" (2007)	"Watch Out" (2008)

"Que Pasa Contigo" is a song by the Italian DJ Alex Gaudino featuring vocals from Sam Obernik. The song was written by Alex Gaudino, Jerma, Sam Obernik and Maurizio Zoffoli. It was released on 12 July 2007. It is the second single released from his debut album My Destination

== Track listing ==
12" Maxi
No.	Title	Length
1.	"Que Pasa Contigo" (Extended)	8:52
2.	"Que Pasa Contigo" (Philippe B & Romain Curtis Remix)	6:17
3.	"Que Pasa Contigo" (Nari & Milani Remix)	6:03
4.	"Que Pasa Contigo" (Naif Theme Remix)	4:54

== Credits and personnel ==
- Lead vocals – Sam Obernik
- Music – Alex Gaudino, Jerma, Sam Obernik, Maurizio Zoffoli
- Lyrics – Alex Gaudino, Jerma, Sam Obernik, Maurizio Zoffoli
- Prodecer – Alex Gaudino, Jerma
- Label: Spinnin' Records

== Chart performance ==
Chart (2010)	Peak position
Belgium (Ultratop 50 Flanders)	50
Belgium (Ultratip Bubbling Under Wallonia)	8
Netherlands (Single Top 100)	66
