= JRDN =

Canadian singer

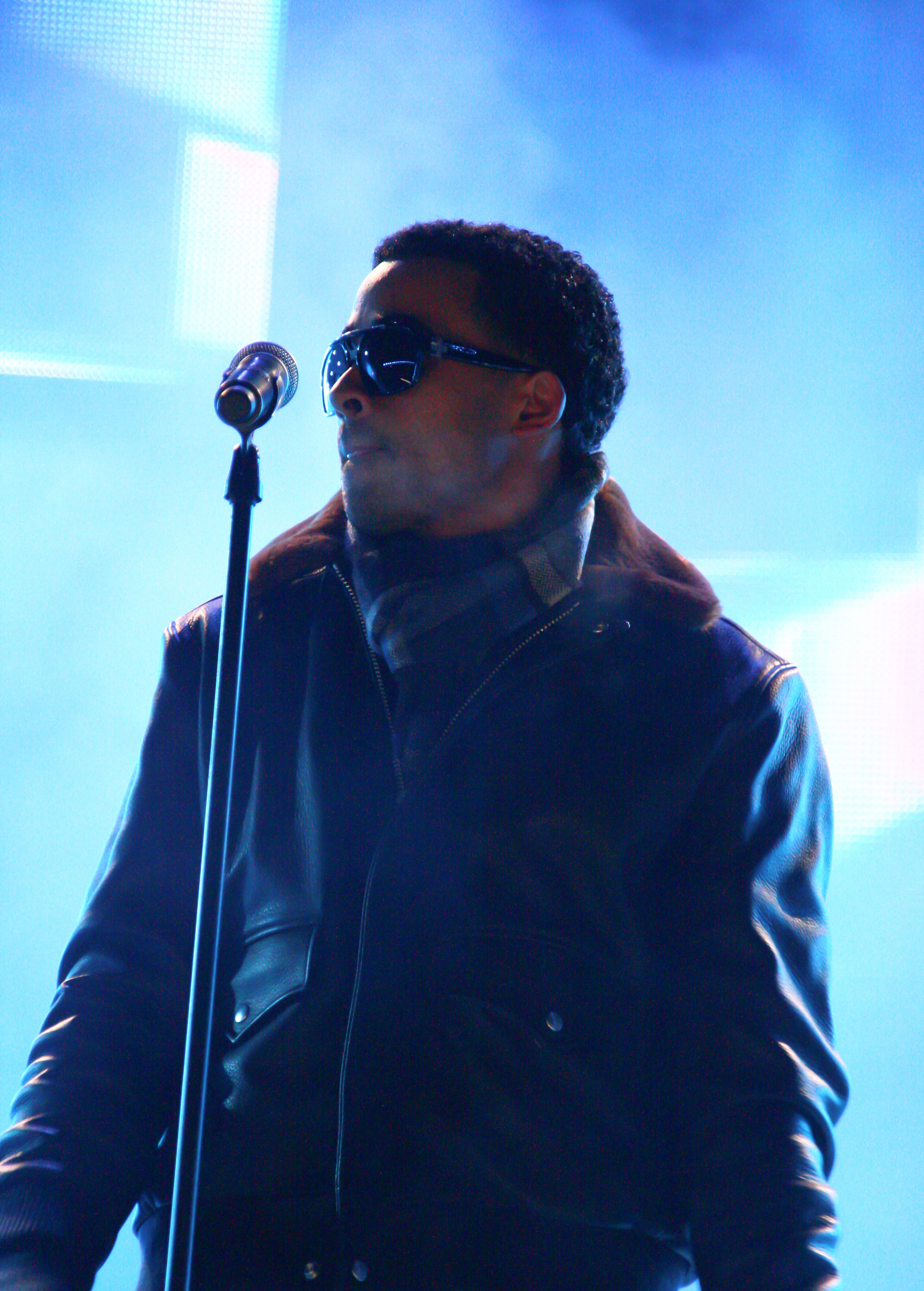
- JRDN at 2011 New Year's Eve Bash at Nathan Phillips Square, Toronto

Background information
- Born: Ralph Jordon Croucher; November 14, 1978 (age 47)
- Origin: Halifax, Nova Scotia, Canada
- Genres: R&B, Hip Hop, Soul
- Labels: Kuya Productions, Flight Academy Music Inc.(B.C)
- Website: www.jrdnmusic.com

Ralph Jordon Croucher (born November 14, 1978), better known by his stage name JRDN, is a Canadian R&B recording artist.

== Early life ==
Ralph Jordon Croucher was born in Halifax, Nova Scotia and moved to Toronto, Ontario at nine months old, where he was raised until the age of 10, when his family returned to Nova Scotia. While he was in Toronto, he lived in Jane and Finch, in the same building as King Lou of the Dream Warriors. The jazz rap pioneer introduced Croucher to hip hop culture at this time. Croucher attended St. Francis Xavier University where he played on the basketball team. After graduation, he played professionally for one year in France.

== Career ==
Jordon gained music experience by competing in Canadian Idol. This gave him an opportunity to perform with Canadian talent, while gaining television exposure. He also worked with Halifax producer Trobiz and recorded mixtapes with the groups N.E.P and Triple Threat. In 2007, Croucher he began to work with producer Classified who produced Croucher’s debut album No Dress Code in 2007.

=== 2007: No Dress Code ===
The 13-track record featured singles and videos for "Selfish Times", "Feelin’ Fine", "So Addicted", "Won't Let Go" and "It’s Raining". It earned Croucher the CBC Galaxie Rising Star prize at the 2007 African Nova Scotian Music Awards show, a nomination for Best Urban Single at the 2008 East Coast Music Awards and an appearance on the CBC Television special, Barenaked East Coast Music. He toured across Canada with Classified and Maestro and opened for Ne-Yo, Snoop Dogg, Rihanna, Nas, and Juelz Santana.

=== 2010: Breakthrough success and IAMJRDN ===
Shortening his name to JRDN, Croucher worked with Toronto's Kuya Productions and the songwriting and production team of Sammy Blues and Bobby Brass, who've worked with Nelly, Mase, Ginuwine, Jesse McCartney, Nicole Scherzinger and Akon. JRDN signed to Kuya Productions in 2009. IAMJRDN is the official debut album by JRDN and was released on November 9, 2010. Since its release the album debuted at number 13 on the Canadian R&B Albums Chart. Off his debut album, the first single "U Can Have It All" brought him to mainstream success by reaching number 20 on the Canadian Hot 100 and the music video reached number 5 on the MuchMusic Countdown. The second "Like Magic" reached number 24 on the Canadian Hot 100 with its music video topping the MuchMusic Countdown. "Like Magic" has been certified Gold by Music Canada on September 10, 2012.

He also served as a Youth Ambassador for D250 and was a delegate in the Citizen Voices program.

In 2023, JRDN's single "What Do I Got To Do" reached #18 on the CBC's Top 20 chart, #35 on the CHR Canada chart, and #38 on the Hot AC chart.

== Discography ==
=== Studio albums ===
- 2010: IAMJRDN
- 2021: Ralph

=== Independent albums ===
- 2007: No Dress Code

=== Reissues ===
- 2011: High Definition (IAMJRDN reissue)

=== EPs ===
- 2014: JRDN
- 2016: Like It (with Cat Dealers)
- 2018: Supply & Demand
- 2019: Bristol Place
- 2022: Red Eye

=== Singles ===
| Year | Title | Peak | Certifications | Album |
| Year | Title | CAN | Certifications | Album |
|---|---|---|---|---|
| 2007 | "Selfish Times" | — | | No Dress Code |
| 2007 | "Feelin' Fine" | — | | No Dress Code |
| 2007 | "So Addicted" | — | | No Dress Code |
| 2007 | "Won't Let Go" | — | | No Dress Code |
| 2007 | "It's Raining" | — | | No Dress Code |
| 2010 | "U Can Have It All" | 20 | CAN: Gold | IAMJRDN |
| 2011 | "Like Magic" | 24 | CAN: Gold | IAMJRDN |
| 2011 | "I Don't Care" | 38 | | IAMJRDN |
| 2011 | "The One" | — | | IAMJRDN |
| 2013 | "Live My Dream " | — | | JRDN |
| 2013 | "Can't Choose" (featuring Kardinal Offishall) | 55 | | JRDN |
| 2014 | "Love Ain't Enough" | — | | JRDN |
| 2014 | "Right Now" | — | | Non-album single |
| 2016 | "Like It" (with Cat Dealers) | — | | Like It |
| 2016 | "Go Slow" (with Heitor Silvano) | — | | Non-album singles |
| 2016 | "I Believe" (with Galck) | — | | Non-album singles |
| 2018 | "Rumours" | — | | Supply & Demand |
| 2018 | "Lemme Show You" | — | | Non-album singles |
| 2019 | "Take It Off" | — | | Non-album singles |
| 2019 | "1st Time" | — | | Bristol Place |
| 2020 | "Pour Me" | — | | Ralph |
| 2020 | "Wish I Could" (with Dub J, Maestro Fresh Wes, Roney, JD Era, Bizz Loc, Turk, and Jelleestone) | — | | Non-album singles |
| 2020 | "Same Sky" (with Kenyan Boys Choir) | — | | Non-album singles |
| 2020 | "Pair of Wings" (with Knotez and O'Sound) | — | | Ralph |
| 2021 | "Missing Us" | — | | Ralph |
| 2021 | "We All Here" (with Carsen Gray) | — | | Non-album singles |
| 2021 | "No More Liquor" (with Jazzfeezy) | — | | Non-album singles |
| 2021 | "Venus" | — | | Non-album singles |
| 2021 | "All My Dawgz Go to Heaven" (with YoungTurky) | — | | Non-album singles |
| 2022 | "Time" (with Dub J) | — | | Non-album singles |
| 2022 | "Feel Real" (with Tim North and Quake Matthews) | — | | Non-album singles |
| 2022 | "Red Eye" | — | | Red Eye |
| 2022 | "Perfect Timing" (with DJ Cee and Rochester) | — | | Non-album singles |
| 2023 | "Call My Name" | — | | Non-album singles |
| 2023 | "What Do I Got To Do" | — | | Non-album singles |
| 2023 | "I Wish You Were Dead" (with Ricky Ayela and Mark Battles) | — | | Non-album singles |
| 2023 | "Fallin" | — | | Non-album singles |
| 2023 | "Like Father, Like Son" (with Peter Jackson) | — | | Non-album singles |
| 2024 | "Four Leaf Clover" (with Dub J) | — | | Non-album singles |
| 2024 | "Evergreen" | — | | Non-album singles |
| 2024 | "Get Me Right" (with Kayo and Nulo) | — | | Non-album singles |
| 2024 | "That's Life" (with Caleigh Barker) | — | | Non-album singles |
| 2024 | "Feel Something" | — | | Non-album singles |
| 2025 | "Give Your All" (with Nulo) | — | | Non-album singles |
| 2025 | "Spin" (with PINEO & LOEB) | — | | Non-album singles |
| 2025 | "Holding" (with Lane Hall) | — | | Non-album singles |
| 2025 | "Little Things" (with Lane Hall) | — | | Non-album singles |
| 2026 | "Top of the Charts" (with Lane Hall) | — | | Non-album singles |
| 2026 | "Marathon" | — | | Non-album singles |
| 2026 | "Can't Go On" | — | | Non-album singles |

=== As featured artist ===
| Year | Title | Peak | Certifications | Album |
| Year | Title | CAN | Certifications | Album |
|---|---|---|---|---|
| 2013 | "Playing With My Heart" (Alex Gaudino feat. JRDN) | 69 | | Doctor Love |
| 2015 | "Darkness to Light" (TomE feat. JRDN and iSH) | — | | Non-album singles |
| 2020 | "More Than a Little" (Flight School feat. JRDN) | — | | Non-album singles |
| 2024 | "Let the Music Play" (Paris Richards and Dub J feat. JRDN) | — | | Non-album singles |

== Sources ==
- "JRDN - Canada's Walk of Fame". Archived from the original on 2010-11-25.
- "JRDN to perform at Music Week awards gala - Festivals & events - Arts - The Vanguard". Archived from the original on 2011-07-06.
- "JRDN PCM Interview". Archived from the original on 2010-11-05.
- "Cityonmyback.com » NEWS: JRDN Releases Debut Album November 2nd". Archived from the original on 2011-07-08.
- "MuchMusic.com | First Spin: JRDN". Archived from the original on 2010-11-08.
- "JRDN Archives | HipHopCanada.com". www.hiphopcanada.com.
- "JRDN - "U Can Have It All" (video) • Music / Video • exclaim.ca". Archived from the original on 2012-10-03.
- "MTV Drops: Swollen Members 'Monsters II'". Archived from the original on 2011-08-08.
- "JRDN - Canada's Walk of Fame". Archived from the original on 2010-11-25.
- "New Artist Alert: JRDN - Eat This!". Archived from the original on 2010-10-17.
