= What a Feeling (Alex Gaudino song) =

2011 single by Alex Gaudino

Single by Alex Gaudino featuring Kelly Rowland

from the album Doctor Love
- Released: 22 March 2011
- Studio: Magnificent (Milan, Italy)
- Length: 2:58
- Label: Magnificent; Ultra; Ministry of Sound
- Songwriters: Alfonso Fortunato Gaudino; Giuseppe D'Albenzio; Emmanuel Mijares; Jenson Vaughan; Kelly Rowland; Joseph "Lonny" Bereal
- Producers: Alex Gaudino; Jason Rooney

Alex Gaudino singles chronology
"I'm in Love (I Wanna Do It)" (2010)	"What a Feeling" (2011)	"I Don't Wanna Dance" (2012)

Kelly Rowland singles chronology
"Motivation" (2011)	"What a Feeling" (2011)	"Favor" (2011)

"What a Feeling" is a song by Italian DJ Alex Gaudino, taken from his second studio album Doctor Love (2013). The song features leading vocals from American singer Kelly Rowland. It was written by Gaudino, Giuseppe D'Albenzio, Emmanuel Mijares, Jenson Vaughan, Rowland and Joseph "Lonny" Bereal. "What a Feeling" was released from 22 March 2011 by Magnificent Records and Ultra Music (Universal Music).

Packaged with several remixes, upon release the single received positive reviews from critics. In Europe it peaked at top-forty in most countries, though notable it reached top-ten in the United Kingdom.

== Background ==
"What a Feeling" is an up-tempo song. It features vocals from Kelly Rowland. It was written by Gaudino, Giuseppe D'Albenzio, Jenson Vaughan, Emmanuel Mijares, Rowland and Joseph "Lonny" Bereal. In an interview with the News of the World's Dan Wootton, Gaudino spoke of how amazing it was to work with Rowland on the song: "Kelly's an amazing artist, so down to earth, nice and fierce[...]Talking to [her] you feel on the same level whoever you are." Rowland replied, during an interview on the video shoot, to questions about what it was like working with Gaudino. She said "I'm so excited to be collaborating together for the first time. He is the nicest person and so talented."

== Critical reception ==
Loretta Charlton from Black Entertainment Television (BET) agreed, saying that "What a Feeling" "is a vibrant track that will draw many summer party people to the dance floor." Digital Spy's Robert Copsey praised Rowland's vocals on the song, calling them "emotionally-charged." Copsey also compared the song's marriage of its "pulsating synths and a vibrant piano hook" to the radio-friendly appeal of David Guetta and Rowland's 2009 hit collaboration, "When Love Takes Over." Copsey concluded his review by saying, "the result is yet another summery club cut built for club 18–30 dancefloors."

== Music video ==
Directed by Frank Gatson Jr., the music video for the song was unveiled on 9 May 2011. It shows Rowland performing the track surrounded by dancers while Gaudino mixes the track in the audience.

== Chart performance ==
On 11 June 2011 the single debuted at number 6 on the UK Singles Chart. The single became Rowland's seventh best selling solo single in the UK with 95,000 copies being sold as of November 2011.

== Track listings ==
- Belgian CD single
1. "What a Feeling" (Radio Version) – 2:58
2. "What a Feeling" (Extended Mix) – 6:39
3. "What a Feeling" (Nicky Romero Remix) – 7:07
4. "What a Feeling" (Hardwell Club Mix) – 7:34
5. "What a Feeling" (I'm Still in Love Club Mix) – 8:12
- Italy CD single
1. "What a Feeling" (Radio Edit) – 2:58
2. "What a Feeling" (Extended Mix) – 6:39
3. "What a Feeling" (I'm Still in Love Club Mix) – 8:06
4. "What a Feeling" (Hardwell Remix) – 7:33
5. "What a Feeling" (Promise Land Remix) – 7:13
6. "What a Feeling" (Nicky Romero Remix) – 7:01
7. "What a Feeling" (HJM Remix) – 6:19
8. "What a Feeling" (Simiolli and Black Remix) – 5:48
- German CD single
1. "What a Feeling" (Radio Edit) – 2:59
2. "What a Feeling" (Extended Mix) – 6:39
- US digital download
1. "What a Feeling" (Radio Edit) – 2:58
2. "What a Feeling" (Extended Mix) – 6:39
3. "What a Feeling" (I'm Still in Love Club Mix) – 8:12
- Digital EP
1. "What a Feeling" (Radio Edit)
2. "What a Feeling" (Extended Mix)
3. "What a Feeling" (Sunship Remix)
4. "What a Feeling" (Hardwell Club Mix)
5. "What a Feeling" (HJM Remix)
6. "What a Feeling" (I'm Still in Love Club Mix)

== Credits and personnel ==
Recording information

- "What a Feeling" was recorded at Magnificent Studios.

Personnel

- Joseph "Lonny" Bereal – songwriter
- Giuseppe D'Albenzio – songwriter
- Alfonson "Alex" Gaudino – songwriter, producer, arranger, audio mixer
- Emmanuel Mijares – songwriter
- Kelly Rowland – songwriter, lead vocals
- Jason Rooney – producer, arranger, mixer, pianist
- Jenson Vaughan – songwriter

== Charts ==
=== Weekly charts ===
Chart (2011)	Peak position
Australia (ARIA)	153
Belgium (Ultratop 50 Flanders)	32
Belgium (Ultratip Bubbling Under Wallonia)	10
CIS Airplay (TopHit)	76
Czech Republic Airplay (ČNS IFPI)	58
Germany (GfK)	84
Germany Dance (Official German Charts)	6
Hungary (Dance Top 40)	12
Hungary (Editors' Choice Top 40)	22
Ireland (IRMA)	38
Italy (FIMI)	47
Netherlands (Single Top 100)	66
Poland (Dance Top 50)	22
Romania (Romanian Top 100)	40
Russia Airplay (TopHit)	72
Scottish Singles Sales (Official Charts)	5
Spain (Airplay Chart)	19
Slovakia Airplay (ČNS IFPI)	21
Ukraine Airplay (TopHit)	123
UK Dance (Official Charts)	3
UK Indie (Official Charts)	1
UK Singles (Official Charts)	6
US Dance Club Songs (Billboard)	26

=== Year-end charts ===
Chart (2011)	Position
Belgium Dance (Ultratop Flanders)	41
Belgium Dance (Ultratop Wallonia)	73
Hungary (Dance Top 40)	71
UK Singles (OCC)	188
Ukraine Airplay (TopHit)	156

== Sales ==
Region	Certification	Certified units/sales
United Kingdom	—	132,000

== Release history ==
Country	Date	Format	Label
United States	22 March 2011	Digital download	Ultra
Italy	5 April 2011	Digital download	Magnificent; Ultra
United States	26 April 2011	Digital download — remixes	Ultra
Germany	13 May 2011	CD single; digital download	Ministry of Sound
Belgium	16 May 2011	CD single	541; N.E.W.S.
United Kingdom	29 May 2011	Digital download	Ministry of Sound
