= Lights Resolve =

- Origin: New York City
- Genres: Alternative rock, indie rock
- Years active: 2006-present
- Members: Matthew Reich; Neal Saini; Luke Daniels; Ryan Foster
- Past members: Michael Sherman
- Website: Official website

Lights Resolve is an American alternative rock band that formed in New York City in 2006. The band consists of Matthew Reich (vocals/guitar), Neal Saini (drums), Luke Daniels (bass/vocals) and Ryan Foster (guitar/vocals). Rolling Stone has named them a Breakout Band in stating that they encompass "the theatrics and power of Muse mixed with the New York flavor of bands like the Bravery." Lights Resolve has played shows and toured with multi-platinum recording artists such as The Used, Panic! at the Disco, AWOLNATION, Twin Atlantic, We the Kings, J. Cole, Shiny Toy Guns, Dashboard Confessional, Phantom Planet and Straylight Run. In addition, they recently performed at Wilkes University's Spring Concert with We The Kings and Yellowcard. The band has also performed at many festivals including The Bamboozle, SXSW, CMJ, DelunaFest and Warped Tour.

Lights Resolve was signed to Rock Ridge Music / Warner / ADA in 2011. Their album, Feel You're Different, was released October 25, 2011. After working on their follow up to "Feel You're Different" their new single "Puzzle" was released on July 20, 2016 with a music video premiere Pop Up Gallery at Sam Brocato Salon in SoHo. The band's latest release, (heART), produced by Mike Sapone, was released on August 25, 2017.

== Discography ==
=== Singles ===
- Another Five Days (2007)
- Dreaming of Love (2009)
- Happens Every Day (2011)
- With the Pieces (2011)
- Puzzle (2016)

=== EPs ===
- Prelude (2007)
- Currency (2008)
- ... (2010)
- (heART) (2017)

=== Albums ===
- Feel You're Different (2011, Rock Ridge)

== Appearances in other media ==
"Dreaming of Love" was available to download in the Rock Band series. It has since been de-listed from the store.

Lights Resolve's song "Long Way to Go" was featured on MTV's Jersey Shore season one. The song was played during the final minutes of the show before the cast left the 'shore house'.

Lights Resolve is the current face of ZipCar, with ads being featured in the NYC Subway, as well as the Metro systems of Chicago, San Francisco, Boston & DC.
