= Jake Williams =

British electronic music producer

- Also known as: Rex the Dog, Mekka, Planet Perfecto, JX
- Born: Jake Williams
- Origin: Brighton, England
- Genres: Eurodance; trance
- Years active: 1994–present
- Labels: Kompakt, Hundehaus, Mute, FFRR, Hooj Choons
- Website: rexthedog.net

Jake Williams (born 1974) is a British electronic music producer and remixer, who currently records as Rex the Dog. Rex the Dog currently releases on Kompakt Records. As Rex the Dog, Williams is a proponent of DIY electronics and performs live with a self-built modular synthesizer. Williams first came to public attention as JX in 1994 following a recording contract with Hooj Choons, a United Kingdom dance independent record label. Williams has also recorded as Mekka and wrote the song "Bullet in the Gun" as part of Paul Oakenfold's collective Planet Perfecto.

== Chart success ==
JX achieved two top 10 singles in the UK; and Australia. "There's Nothing I Won't Do" (1996) was the highest-charting single in the UK, reaching number 4. Williams also charted in the UK as writer and producer on Planet Perfecto's "Bullet in the Gun", reaching number 7 in 2000.

== Discography ==
=== Studio albums ===
Title	Details	Peak chart positions
Title	Details	UK Dance
The Rex the Dog Show	Release date: 29 August 2008; Label: Hundehaus Records; Formats: CD	38
"—" denotes releases that did not chart

=== Singles ===
==== As JX ====
Year	Single	Peak chart positions					Certifications	Album
Year	Single	UK	AUS	IRE	NED	SPA	Certifications	Album
1994	"Son of a Gun"	13	6	—	38	—	AUS: Gold	Singles only
1995	"You Belong to Me"	17	4	15	15	1	AUS: Gold	Singles only
1995	"Son of a Gun" (1995 re-issue)	6	—	15	—	—		Singles only
1996	"There's Nothing I Won't Do"	4	26	14	—	—	UK: Platinum	Singles only
1997	"Close to Your Heart"	18	90	—	—	—		Singles only
2004	"Restless"	22	—	—	68	—		Singles only
"—" denotes releases that did not chart or were not released in that country.

==== As Rex the Dog ====
Year	Single	Album
2004	"Prototype"	Singles only
2004	"Frequency"	Singles only
2006	"Maximize"	Singles only
2007	"Circulate"	The Rex the Dog Show
2008	"Bubblicious"	The Rex the Dog Show
2008	"I Can See You, Can You See Me?"	The Rex the Dog Show
2011	"POW!"	Rex the Dog & Kris Menace
2013	"Do You Feel What I Feel" (feat. Jamie McDermott)	Rex the Dog
2015	"Sicko"	Singles only
2016	"You Are a Blade"	Singles only
2016	"Teufelsberg"	Singles only
2018	"Crasher"	Singles only
2019	"Vortex"	Singles only
2019	"Experimental Housing"	Singles only
2020	"Transmitter" (with DJ Haus)	Singles only
2023	"Change This Pain For Ecstasy"	Singles only
