= I Don't Wanna Dance (Alex Gaudino song) =

Single by Alex Gaudino featuring Taboo

from the album Doctor Love
- Released: 3 September 2012
- Recorded: 2012
- Genre: Dance
- Length: 4:36
- Label: Ultra Records
- Songwriter(s): Taio Cruz, Alfonso Fortunato Gaudino, Giuseppe D'Albenzio, Jamie Luis Gomez

Alex Gaudino singles chronology
"What a Feeling" (2011)	"I Don't Wanna Dance" (2012)	"Playing with My Heart" (2013)

"I Don't Wanna Dance" is a song by Italian DJ Alex Gaudino, taken from his second studio album Doctor Love (2013). The song was released from 3 September 2012 by Ultra Records. The song was written by Taio Cruz, Alfonso Fortunato Gaudino, Giuseppe D'Albenzio and Jamie Luis Gomez. The song features vocals from American singer, actor, and rapper Taboo. The song features samples from "Can You Feel It" by The Jackson 5.

== Music video ==
A music video to accompany the release of "I Don't Wanna Dance" was first released onto YouTube on 16 August 2012 at a total length of three minutes and nine seconds.

== Track listing ==
Digital download
No.	Title	Length
1.	"I Don’t Wanna Dance" (Radio Edit)	3:07
2.	"I Don’t Wanna Dance" (Original Mix)	6:12
3.	"I Don’t Wanna Dance" (Radio Instrumental)	3:07
4.	"I Don’t Wanna Dance" (Original Instrumental)	6:12

== Charts ==
=== Weekly charts ===
Weekly chart performance for "I Don't Wanna Dance"
Chart (2012)	Peak position
Belgium (Ultratop 50 Flanders)	34
Belgium (Ultratip Bubbling Under Wallonia)	2
Czech Republic (Rádio – Top 100)	42
Russia Airplay (TopHit)	20

=== Year-end charts ===
Year-end chart performance for "I Don't Wanna Dance"
Chart (2012)	Position
Russia Airplay (TopHit)	88

== Release history ==
Region	Date	Format	Label
Belgium	3 September 2012	Digital download	Ultra Records
