= Son of a Gun (JX song) =

1994 single by JX

Single by JX
- Released: 21 March 1994
- Genre: House
- Length: 3:15
- Label: Hooj Choons; Internal Dance; Ffrreedom (1995)
- Songwriters: JX; Norman Harris; Allan Felder; Bunny Sigler
- Producers: JX; Red Jerry

JX singles chronology
"Son of a Gun" (1994)	"You Belong to Me" (1995)

Music video
- "Son of a Gun" on YouTube

"Son of a Gun" is a song by British dance music DJ Jake Williams, released under the name JX. It was released as his debut single in March 1994 by Hooj Choons and Internal Dance, reaching number six in the United Kingdom and Australia, as well as the top 40 in the Netherlands. The song contains samples from the 1976 song "Touch and Go" by Ecstasy, Passion & Pain featuring Barbara Roy.

It became a club hit and received positive reviews from many music critics, who praised the song's vocal hooks. Two different music videos were made to promote the single; the 1995 version was directed by Zowie Broach.

== Critical reception ==
In his weekly UK chart commentary in Dotmusic, James Masterton described the song as a "bubbling synthesised dance hit". A reviewer from Music Week gave it a score of four out of five, adding, "A corking house tune that has failed to keep its head down, hence the reissue. Lyrics with attitude and some stomping remixes from JX and Red Jerry among others." Iestyn George from NME praised it as a "classic camp-a-rama". The Record Mirror Dance Update complimented it as a "banging Euro stomper".

An RM editor, Andy Beevers gave it four out of five, complimenting it as an "energetic UK house track, which boasts a strong vocal hook" and "a potential hit." He also described it as "an unstoppable belter with dead catchy hi-energy synth riffs and the unforgettable 'A man that's on the run is a dirty son of a gun' female vocal hook. There are apparently Alex Party remixes on the way, although this existing mix should be all you need to create dancefloor mayhem." In his dance column DJ Directory, James Hamilton described it as a "diva prodded raver".

== Chart performance ==
In the UK, the single originally peaked at number 13 on the UK Singles Chart on 2 April 1994. In August 1995, it was re-released after "You Belong to Me"'s chart success and peaked at number six the same month. On the UK Dance Singles Chart and Music Week's Dance Singles chart, it reached number two and number one, respectively. On the UK Club Chart, "Son of a Gun" peaked at number 14.

In Scotland, it peaked at number four. In Ireland, it entered the top 20, peaking at number 15. In the Netherlands, it became a top-40 hit, peaking at number 35. On the Eurochart Hot 100, the single reached number 35. "Son of a Gun" was a successful top-10 hit in Australia in August 1994, peaking at number six and spending 19 weeks inside the ARIA Top 50 singles chart, with 6 weeks within the top 10. It ended up as the 49th most sold single in Australia in 1994.

== Airplay ==
"Son of a Gun" peaked at number 11 on the European Dance Radio Chart on 16 September 1995. In Australia, the chart success of the song was very much, almost solely, due to a community radio station in Melbourne, 98.9 North West FM. The station instantly identified the hit quality of the song and immediately added it to the station's playlist on high rotation, and also incorporated grabs (small parts) of the song in station IDs, "cue to call" promotions and other program elements. This almost saturation exposure of "Son of a Gun" not only brought the song to the attention of the station's listeners, but also forced the hand of other Australian radio stations to add the song to their own playlists, some taking a full three months after North West FM's debut. In the United Kingdom, "Son of a Gun" reached number 26 on the Music Week UK Airplay Chart on 2 September 1995.

== Track listings ==
- 12-inch, UK and Europe

A1: "Son of a Gun" (Red Jerry/JX Mix)
A2: "Son of a Gun" (C.Y.B. Run Mix)
B1: "Son of a Gun" (Alex Party Mix)
B2: "Son of a Gun" (A Deeper Cut)

- CD single, UK
1. "Son of a Gun" (Hooj Edit) – 3:38
2. "Son of a Gun" (Red Jerry/JX Mix) – 7:35
3. "Son of a Gun" (Alex Party Mix) – 4:51
4. "Son of a Gun" (C.Y.B. Run Mix) – 4:39
5. "Son of a Gun" (A Deeper Cut) – 7:29
6. "Son of a Gun" (Original Mix) – 5:50
- CD maxi, Europe
1. "Son of a Gun" (Original Hooj Edit) – 3:15
2. "Son of a Gun" (JX & Red Jerry Flog The Horse Remix) – 7:12
3. "Son of a Gun" (Blu Peter Vs Trigger Bitchin Remix) – 6:35
4. "Son of a Gun" (Candy Girls "Where's The Crack" Remix) – 9:07
5. "Son of a Gun" (Original Hooj 12" Mix) – 6:58

== Charts ==
=== Weekly charts ===
Chart (1994–1995)	Peak position
Australia (ARIA)	6
Europe (Eurochart Hot 100)	35
Europe (European Dance Radio)	11
Ireland (IRMA)	15
Israel (Israeli Singles Chart)	9
Netherlands (Dutch Top 40)	35
Netherlands (Single Top 100)	38
Scottish Singles Sales (Official Charts)	4
UK Singles (Official Charts)	6
UK Dance (Official Charts)	2
UK Airplay (Music Week)	26
UK Dance (Music Week)	1
UK Indie (Music Week)	1
UK Club Chart (Music Week)	14
UK Pop Tip Club Chart (Music Week)	18

=== Year-end charts ===
Chart (1994)	Position
Australia (ARIA)	49
UK Singles (OCC)	135
UK Club Chart (Music Week)	80

== Release history ==
Region	Date	Format(s)	Label(s)	Ref.
United Kingdom	21 March 1994	7-inch vinyl; 12-inch vinyl; CD; cassette	Hooj Choons; Internal Dance	
Australia	20 June 1994	CD; cassette	Hooj Choons; Internal Dance; Polydor	
United Kingdom (re-release)	7 August 1995	12-inch vinyl; CD; cassette	Ffrreedom; Hooj Choons	
