= Infinity cove =

Photographic technique

In photography, an infinity cove or infinity cyclorama is an all-white space with no corners, designed to give the impression that the background of an object extends to infinity.

Infinity coves range from a simple roll of paper to whole studios (often used for photographing cars). The principle of the design is that everything behind the object is curved so that no edges can be seen.

Example of camera set-up and the result

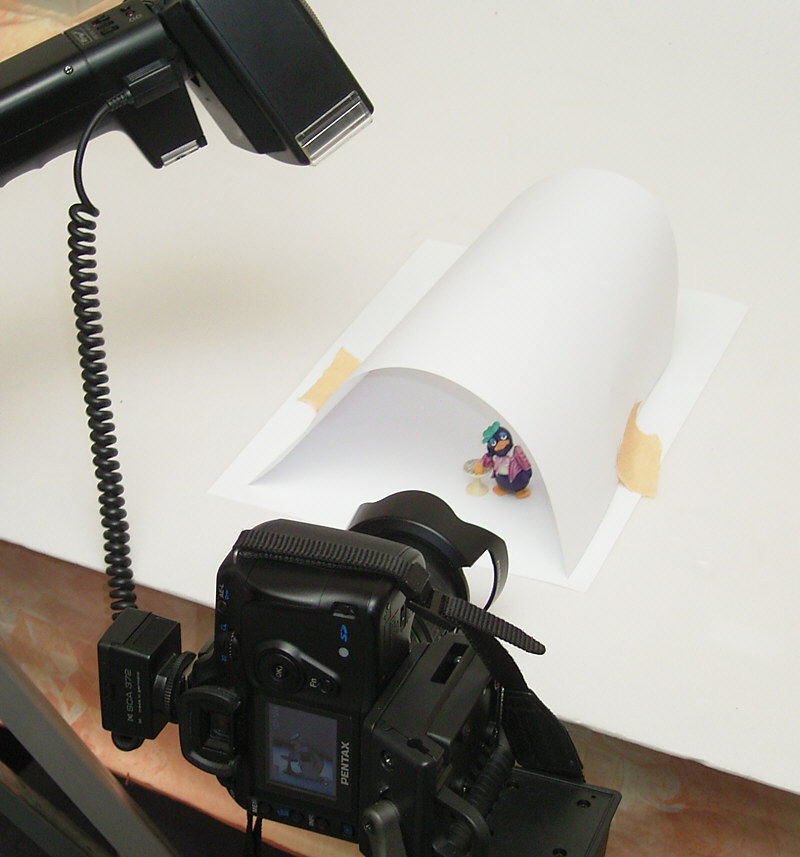
Improvised small infinity cove used to photograph a model of a drinking penguin character.

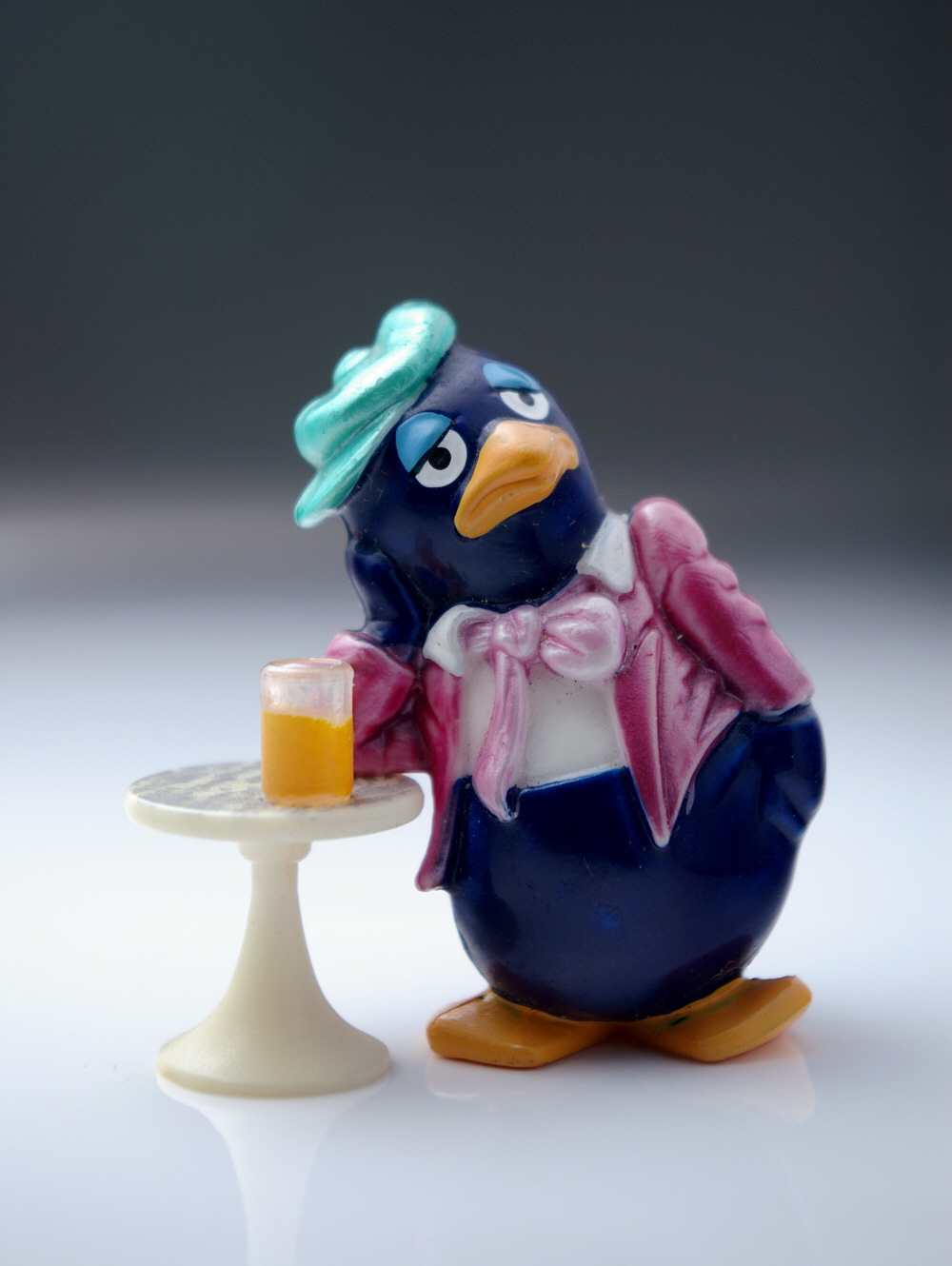
Resulting photo with "infinite" white-gradient background.
