= I'm in Love (I Wanna Do It) =

"I'm In Love (I Wanna Do It)"

Single by Alex Gaudino featuring Maxine Ashley

from the album Doctor Love
- Released: 19 September 2010
- Recorded: Magnificent Studios, Milan
- Genre: House
- Length: 2:51
- Label: Ministry of Sound
- Songwriters: Alex Gaudino, Giuseppe D'Albenzio, Tim Powell
- Producers: Alex Gaudino, Jason Rooney

Alex Gaudino singles chronology
"I Love Rock 'n' Roll" (2008)	"I'm In Love (I Wanna Do It)" (2010)	"What a Feeling" (2011)

"I'm in Love (I Wanna Do It)" is a song by Italian house DJ Alex Gaudino from his second studio album, Doctor Love (2013). The song was written by Gaudino, Giuseppe D'Albenzio and Tim Powell. It was released as the lead single from the album on 19 September 2010 in the United Kingdom. The song reached number 10 in the UK, and charted at number one on Billboard's Hot Dance Airplay chart in October 2010. The song originally only contained male vocals, but the vocals of American singer Maxine Ashley were later added for commercial release. Ashley, however, is not officially credited as a guest vocalist on the commercial release.

== Track listing ==
CD single Digital download
No.	Title	Length
1.	"I'm in Love (I Wanna Do It)" (Vocal Edit)	2:51
2.	"I'm in Love (I Wanna Do It)" (Vocal Club Mix)	8:05
3.	"I'm in Love (I Wanna Do It)" (Original Extended)	7:27
4.	"I'm in Love (I Wanna Do It)" (Wideboys Remix)	7:13
5.	"I'm in Love (I Wanna Do It)" (Kurd Maverick Remix)	7:42
6.	"I'm in Love (I Wanna Do It)" (Jupiter Ace Vocal Remix)	4:42

== Credits and personnel ==
- Alex Gaudino – songwriter, producer, performer, arrangement and recording
- Giuseppe D'Albenzio – songwriter
- Tim Powell – songwriter, mixing and additional vocal production
- Jason Rooney – producer, performer, arrangement and recording
- John Biancale – male vocals
- Maxine Ashley – female vocals

== Charts ==
=== Weekly charts ===
Weekly chart performance for "I'm in Love (I Wanna Do It)"
Chart (2010)	Peak position
Australia (ARIA)	196
Belgium (Ultratop 50 Flanders)	25
Belgium (Ultratip Bubbling Under Wallonia)	6
CIS Airplay (TopHit)	16
Netherlands (Dutch Top 40)	16
Netherlands (Single Top 100)	46
Poland (Dance Top 50)	22
Poland (Video Chart)	3
Poland (Polish Airplay New)	2
Russia Airplay (TopHit)	15
Scotland Singles (OCC)	7
Slovakia Airplay (ČNS IFPI)	52
UK Dance (OCC)	2
UK Singles (OCC)	10
US Dance Club Songs (Billboard)	41
US Dance/Mix Show Airplay (Billboard)	1

=== Year-end charts ===
Year-end chart performance for "I'm in Love (I Wanna Do It)"
Chart (2010)	Position
Netherlands (Dutch Top 40)	89
Russia Airplay (TopHit)	181
US Dance/Mix Show Airplay (Billboard)	7

== Release history ==
Region	Date	Format	Label
United Kingdom	19 September 2010	Digital download, CD single	Ministry of Sound
