= Alex Gaudino =

Italian DJ and record producer (born 1970)

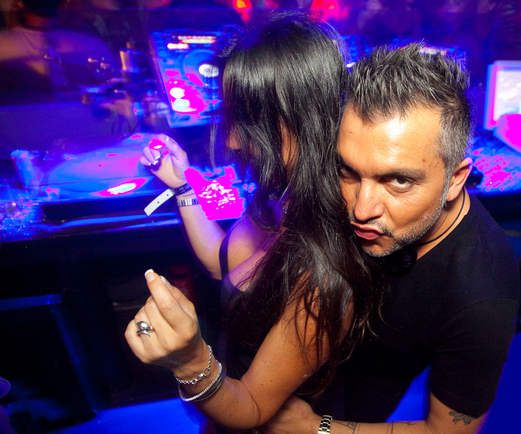
- DJ Alex Gaudino at Pacha London. (2009)

Background information
- Also known as: Gaudino da Costa
- Born: Alessandro Alfonso Fortunato Gaudino; 23 January 1970 (age 56); Salerno, Campania, Italy
- Genres: House; electro house
- Occupations: DJ; record producer
- Years active: 1993–present
- Labels: Rise Records; Ministry of Sound; Data Records
- Website: soundcloud.com/djalexgaudino

Alessandro Alfonso Fortunato Gaudino (Italian pronunciation: [alesˈsandro alˈfɔnso fortuˈnaːto ɡauˈdiːno]; born 23 January 1970 in Salerno, Campania), better known by his stage name Alex Gaudino, is an Italian DJ and record producer.

== Biography ==
=== Early career (1993–2006) ===
Alessandro Alfonso Fortunato Gaudino was born in Salerno, Italy. He first began his music career working for Flying Records and UMM.

In 1998, with the support of the well-known Italian record company Time, Alex founded his own label, Rise Records, which quickly produced a string of hit records by artists such as The Tamperer, Black Legend and Robbie Rivera's "Bang", which earned him a nomination for Best European A&R at the 2000 European Music Awards, held in London.

Alex Gaudino is also well known for being a member of the trio Lil' Love with Jerma and Sharon May Linn.

In 2005, Lil' Love's track "Little Love" was exclusively played by Pete Tong at Nikki Beach in Miami during WMC 2005. The record produced by Jerma was released on Positiva in the UK and reached the top of the UK Dance Chart. In 2006, Alex remixed with Jerma for Pete Tong & Chris Cox, Moussu T and James Kakande. Later in 2006, Gaudino signed a record deal with Ministry of Sound label in the UK. He later released "Reaction", and "Head over Heels" on the label.

=== Chart success, My Destination and Doctor Love (2006–present) ===
In December 2006, Gaudino released his second single "Destination Calabria" featuring vocals from Crystal Waters 2004 track "Destination Unknown" and elements of the saxophone. The song was hugely popular across Europe reaching top ten in nine countries and top twenty in many others. It also managed to peak eight on the U.S. Hot Dance Club Songs. Later on, in 2008 he released his third single "Watch Out" Featuring vocals from English singer, Shèna. It achieved moderate success across Europe and peaked sixteen on the UK Singles Chart.

On 6 October 2008, he released his debut studio album, My Destination. As well as working with Crystal Waters and Shena on the album, Gaudino also worked with Hardwell.

In late 2009, he began work on his second album, which is pre-titled "Magnificent". In October 2010, he released his first single from his second studio album, "I'm in Love (I Wanna Do It)" featuring vocals from Maxine Ashley. It peaked ten on the UK Singles Chart and the Dutch Top 40. It also marked Gaudino's first number one in the U.S., peaking number one on the U.S. Hot Dance Airplay Chart. The album later was changed to Doctor Love.

The following year, 2011, he released his second single from his second album, "What a Feeling", featuring American R&B singer, Kelly Rowland. It peaked six on the UK Singles Chart and top forty in many European countries. It also peaked 26 on the US Hot Dance Club Songs. The second album, Doctor Love, was released in 2013.

== Discography ==
=== Studio albums ===
Title	Album details
My Destination	Release date: 6 October 2008; Label: Universal Records; Format: CD, music download
Doctor Love	Release date: 12 March 2013; Label: Happy Records, Ultra Music; Format: CD, music download

=== Singles ===
==== As lead artist ====
Year	Title	Chart positions									Album
Year	Title	ITA	AUS	BEL	FRA	IRE	NL	SVK	SWE	UK	Album
2006	"Reaction" (featuring Jerma)	—	—	—	—	—	—	—	—	200	My Destination
2007	"Destination Calabria" (featuring Crystal Waters)	12	3	2	6	2	14	31	10	4	My Destination
2007	"Que Pasa Contigo" (featuring Sam Obernik)	—	—	50	—	—	66	—	—	—	My Destination
2008	"Watch Out" (featuring Shèna)	31	118	52	—	23	12	43	—	16	My Destination
2010	"I'm in Love (I Wanna Do It)"	—	196	25	—	44	46	52	—	10	Doctor Love
2011	"What A Feeling" (featuring Kelly Rowland)	47	153	32	—	38	66	21	—	6	Doctor Love
2012	"I Don't Wanna Dance" (featuring Taboo)	—	—	34	—	—	—	—	—	—	Doctor Love
2013	"Playing with My Heart" (featuring JRDN)	—	—	61	—	—	—	—	—	—	Doctor Love
2013	"Is This Love" (featuring Jordin Sparks)	—	—	—	—	—	—	—	—	—	Doctor Love
2013	"Beautiful" (featuring Mario)	—	—	—	—	—	—	—	—	—	Doctor Love
2015	"Lights Go Out" (with Manufactured Superstars featuring Zak Waters)	—	—	—	—	—	—	—	—	—	Non-album singles
2020	"Remember Me" (with Bottai featuring Moncrieff & Blush)	—	—	90	—	—	—	—	—	—	Non-album singles
2021	"Do It Again" (with Bottai featuring Stevie Appleton)	—	—	—	—	—	—	—	—	—	Non-album singles
2022	"Rely on Me" (with Sigala and Gabry Ponte)	—	—	—	—	—	—	—	—	—	Every Cloud – Silver Linings
"—" denotes single that did not chart or was not released.

==== Promotional singles ====
Year	Title	Chart positions		Album
Year	Title	BEL (Wa)	NL	Album
2008	"I Love Rock 'n' Roll" (with Jason Rooney)	60	—	Non-album singles
2012	"Chinatown"	—	69	Non-album singles
2013	"Missing You" (featuring Nicole Scherzinger)	87	—	Non-album singles
"—" denotes single that did not chart or was not released.

=== Remixes ===
- 2020: Alex Gaudino and Bottai featuring Moncrieff & Blush — "Remember Me" (Alex Gaudino and Hiisak Remix)
- 2020: D3fai and Nathassia — "Change the World" (Alex Gaudino and Teo Mandrelli Remix)
