= Rise Records (Italy) =

Italian record label

- Parent company: Time Records
- Founded: 1998; 27 years ago
- Founder: Alex Gaudino, Giacomo Maiolini (co-founder)
- Status: Active
- Genre: House, Italo dance, trance
- Country of origin: Italy
- Location: Brescia

Rise Records (a.k.a. Rise Italy) is an Italian record label of house music and Italo dance, owned by Time Group and founded by Giacomo Maiolini. in 1998. Rise label rose as department of Time Records, after the death of Downtown.

== History ==
Rise Records - which belongs to Time Group - was entrusted to the A&R Alex Gaudino, who thanks to his intuition and his hard work obtains quickly a great credibility among the music operators.

== Rise Records artists ==
- Alex Gaudino
- Black Legend
- Christian Cheval
- Daniele Tignino
- Electroluv
- Jason Rooney
- Laurent Wolf (only in Italy)
- Mario Fargetta
- Mousse T (only in Italy)
