= Dreamgirls: Music from the Motion Picture =

Soundtrack album by Various Artists
- Released: December 5, 2006
- Recorded: The Underlab, Los Angeles: December 2005 – April 2006
- Genres: Soul; R&B; disco
- Length: 65:05
- Labels: Music World; Columbia; Sony Urban Music
- Producer: The Underdogs

Singles from Dreamgirls: Music from the Motion Picture
- 1. "One Night Only" Released: August 15, 2006; 2. "And I Am Telling You I'm Not Going" Released: December 5, 2006; 3. "Listen" Released: January 29, 2007

Dreamgirls: Music from the Motion Picture is a soundtrack album for the 2006 film Dreamgirls. The album was released by Music World Entertainment and Columbia Records on December 5, 2006 in two versions: a single-disc standard release, and a two-disc deluxe edition. The one-disc version includes highlights from the film's songs, including "And I Am Telling You I'm Not Going", "One Night Only", and "Listen", while the two disc version includes all songs present in the film alongside several bonus tracks.

== Background ==
Harvey Mason Jr. and Damon Thomas of the production team The Underdogs served as producers and arrangers for the film's soundtrack, which is performed by the actors in the film, including Jamie Foxx, Beyoncé Knowles, Eddie Murphy, Jennifer Hudson, Anika Noni Rose, Sharon Leal, Keith Robinson, and others. The soundtrack includes four new songs not present in the stage version of Dreamgirls: "Listen", "Love You I Do", "Patience", and "Perfect World". "Listen" was released to radio the week of October 16 as the first official Dreamgirls soundtrack single; the disco version of "One Night Only" was issued in late summer as a 12" club single and as an exclusive download on iTunes.

== Critical reception ==
The Dreamgirls soundtrack was nominated for the 2008 Grammy Award for Best Compilation Soundtrack Album for a Motion Picture, Television or Other Visual Media, losing to The Beatles' Love. "Listen", "Love You I Do", and "Patience" were all nominated for the 2006 Academy Award for Best Original Song. However, "Love You I Do" won the Grammy that same year for Best Song Written for a Motion Picture, Television or Other Visual Media.

== Commercial performance ==
The one-disc version of Dreamgirls: Music from the Motion Picture debuted at number 20 on the US Billboard 200, with sales of 92,000 units. In its fifth week of release, the soundtrack reached the top of the Billboard 200 with a sales week of 68,000 units. The following week, the soundtrack broke its own all-time low record, holding on to the number one spot with a sales decrease of 9% good for 60,000. This record was later broken by Taylor Swift selling 52,000 copies of her album Speak Now.

== Track listing ==
All tracks produced by The Underdogs (Harvey Mason Jr. and Damon Thomas) and supervised by Matt Sullivan and Randy Spendlove except for the dance mixes on the Deluxe set (remixed by Eric Kupper & Richie Jones).

All tracks are written by Henry Krieger and Tom Eyen (unless otherwise noted).

No.	Title	Performer(s)	Length
1.	"Move"	Jennifer Hudson, Beyoncé Knowles, Anika Noni Rose	2:08
2.	"Fake Your Way to the Top"	Eddie Murphy, Rose, Hudson, Knowles	3:54
3.	"Cadillac Car"	Murphy, Rose, Hudson, Knowles, Rory O'Malley, Laura Bell Bundy, Anne Warren	2:22
4.	"Steppin' to the Bad Side"	Jamie Foxx, Keith Robinson, Hinton Battle, Murphy, Rose, Hudson, Knowles	4:55
5.	"Love You I Do" (Henry Krieger, Siedah Garrett)	Hudson	2:50
6.	"I Want You Baby"	Murphy, Rose, Hudson, Knowles	2:53
7.	"Family"	Robinson, Hudson, Knowles, Rose, Foxx	3:22
8.	"Dreamgirls"	Knowles, Hudson, Rose	3:20
9.	"It's All Over"	Hudson, Foxx, Knowles, Rose, Robinson, Sharon Leal	3:41
10.	"And I Am Telling You I'm Not Going"	Hudson	4:45
11.	"When I First Saw You"	Foxx	2:17
12.	"Patience" (Henry Krieger, Willie Reale)	Murphy, Rose, Robinson	3:35
13.	"I Am Changing"	Hudson	4:04
14.	"I Meant You No Harm / Jimmy's Rap"	Murphy	3:12
15.	"One Night Only"	Hudson	2:58
16.	"One Night Only (Disco)"	Knowles, Rose, Leal	3:10
17.	"Listen" (Henry Krieger, Anne Preven, Scott Cutler, Beyoncé Knowles)	Knowles	3:40
18.	"Hard to Say Goodbye"	Knowles, Rose, Leal	2:37
19.	"Dreamgirls (Finale)"	Hudson, Knowles, Rose, Leal	2:33
20.	"When I First Saw You (Duet)"	Foxx, Knowles	3:03

Deluxe Edition

Disc one
No.	Title	Performer(s)	Length
1.	"I'm Lookin' for Something"	Maxi Anderson, Charlene Carmen, Keisha Heely
2.	"Goin' Downtown"	Steve Russell, Durrell Babbs, Luke Boyd, Eric Dawkins
3.	"Takin' the Long Way Home"	Michael-Leon Wooley
4.	"Move"	Hudson, Knowles, Rose
5.	"Fake Your Way to the Top"	Murphy, Rose, Hudson, Knowles
6.	"Big (Jazz Instrumental)"
7.	"Cadillac Car"	Murphy, Rose, Hudson, Knowles, O'Malley, Bundy, Warren
8.	"Steppin' to the Bad Side"	Foxx, Robinson, Battle, Murphy, Rose, Hudson, Knowles
9.	"Love You I Do" (Henry Krieger, Siedah Garrett)	Hudson
10.	"I Want You Baby"	Murphy, Rose, Hudson, Knowles
11.	"Family"	Robinson, Hudson, Knowles, Rose, Foxx
12.	"Dreamgirls"	Knowles, Hudson, Rose
13.	"Heavy"	Knowles, Hudson, Rose
14.	"It's All Over"	Hudson, Foxx, Knowles, Rose, Robinson, Leal
15.	"And I Am Telling You I'm Not Going^{1}"	Hudson

Disc two
No.	Title	Performer(s)	Length
1.	"I'm Somebody^{2}"	Knowles, Rose, Leal
2.	"When I First Saw You"	Foxx
3.	"Patience" (Henry Krieger, Willie Reale)	Murphy, Rose, Robinson
4.	"I Am Changing"	Hudson
5.	"Perfect World" (Henry Krieger, Siedah Garrett)	Steve Russell
6.	"I Meant You No Harm / Jimmy's Rap"	Murphy
7.	"Lorrell Loves Jimmy / Family (Reprise)"	Rose, Knowles, Leal
8.	"Step On Over"	Knowles, Rose, Leal
9.	"I Miss You Old Friend"	Loretta Devine
10.	"Effie, Sing My Song^{3}"	Robinson, Hudson
11.	"One Night Only"	Hudson
12.	"One Night Only (Disco)"	Knowles, Rose, Leal
13.	"Listen" (Henry Krieger, Anne Preven, Scott Cutler, Beyoncé Knowles)	Knowles
14.	"Hard to Say Goodbye"	Knowles, Rose, Leal
15.	"Dreamgirls (Finale)"	Hudson, Knowles, Rose, Leal
16.	"Curtain Call^{4}"
17.	"Family (End Title)"	Robinson, Hudson, Knowles, Rose, Foxx
18.	"When I First Saw You (Duet)"	Foxx, Knowles
19.	"One Night Only (Dance Mix)"	Knowles, Rose, Leal
20.	"And I Am Telling You I'm Not Going (Dance Mix)"	Hudson
21.	"Patience (Conductor Demo)^{5}" (Henry Krieger, Willie Reale; produced by Krieger)	Henry Krieger

Notes

- ^{1} Additional song on this track: "Love Love You Baby" performed by Knowles, Rose and Leal.
- ^{2} Track also includes a medley of "Move", "Love Love You Baby" and "Heavy".
- ^{3} Present in the musical, "Effie, Sing My Song" was recorded and shot for the film, but cut after early previews and replaced with an alternate dialogue version of the corresponding scene. It was included in the director's cut released on Blu-ray in 2017.
- ^{4} Contains instrumental versions of "Dreamgirls", "Dreamgirls (Finale)" and "Love You I Do".
- ^{5} Hidden song on this track: "Effie White's Gonna Win" performed by Hudson.

== Personnel ==
Credits are adapted from the album's booklet.

Technical and production

- Producer: Damon Thomas and Harvey Mason Jr. (The Underdogs)
- Music supervised by: Randy Spendlove and Matt Sullivan
- Engineer: Chris Spilfogel and Dabling Harward from the Underlab in Los Angeles, California, USA
- Mixed by: Manny Marroquin, Aaron Renner, and Chris Spilfogel
- Assistant Engineers: Aaron Renner and Riley Mackin
- Mastered by: Vlado Meller at Sony Music Studios in New York City, New York, USA
- Vocals supervised by: Paul Bogaev
- Marketing Quincy S. Jackson
- Art direction: Erwin Gorostiza, Fusako Chubachi
- Album design: Fusako Chubachi
- Photography: David James
- Package coordinators: Tom Choi and Steven Jacobson
- Executive producers: Bill Condon, Mathew Knowles, and Glen Brunman
- Arrangements by: The Underdogs, Randy Spendlove, David Campbell, Matt Sullivan, Damon Intrabartolo, Deborah Lurie, Bill Condon, Henry Krieger, Jerry Hey, and Tim Carmon
- Music editor: Paul Rabjohns
- Orchestral contractors: Jolie Levine and Ivy Skoff
- Copyists: Mark Graham, Jo Anne Kane Music
- Strings recorded by: Jess Sutcliffe at Capitol Studios in Los Angeles, California, USA
  - (Assistant engineers: Paul Smith, Aaron Walk, Bryan Walk)
- Strings recorded by: Scott Campbell at Henson Recording Studios in Los Angeles, California, USA
  - (Assistant engineer: Kevin Mills)
- Strings recorded by: Troy Halderson at Clinton Studios in New York City, New York, USA
  - (Assistant engineers: Sheldon Yellowhair, Bryan Smith)
- Additional recording done at the Record Plant in Los Angeles, California, USA

Orchestra

- Orchestra Conducted by Henry Krieger
- Piano: John Beasley, Tim Carmon, Eric Griggs, Greg Phillinganes, Kevin Randolph
- Saxophones: Frederick Fiddmont, Daniel Higgins, Mark Rivera
- Guitars: Mike DelGuidice, Eric Jackson, Michael Thompson, Randy Spendlove
- Trumpets: Wayne Bergeron, Gary Grant, Jerry Hey
- Bass: Nathan East, James Johnson, Harvey Mason Jr.
- Trombones: Steve Holtman, William Reichenbach
- Drums: Glendon Campbell, Gordon Campbell, Ricky Lawson, Harvey Mason Jr., Harvey Mason Sr., Anthony Moore
- Harp: Gayle Levant
- Percussion: Harvey Mason Sr., Harvey Mason Jr.
- Keyboards: Harvey Mason Jr., Kevin Randolph, Randy Spendlove, Damon Thomas
- Celli: Larry Corbett, Steve Erdody, Suzie Katamaya, Daniel Smith, Jennifer Kuhn, Vanessa Freebairn-Smith, Rudolph Stein
- Background vocals: Melissa Bereal, Richard Bowers, Raven Dillard, Natalie Ganther, Nicole Ganther, Larry Greene, Camile Grigsby, Cassandra Grigsby, Chara Hammond, Eric King, Erica King, Kalia Rafa, Kevin Shannon, Nicole Thrash, Robert Thrash
- Violas: Robert Becker, Denyse Buffum, Andrew Duckles, John Hayhurst, David Stenske, Shalini Vijayan, Kristin Wilkinson
- Violins: Roberto Cani, Darius Campo, Susan Chatman, Daphne Chen, Mario Deleon, Armen Garabedian, Berj Garabedian, Endre Granat, Alan Grunfeld, Julian Hallmark, Neil Hammond, Geraldo Hilera, Sharon Jackson, Peter Kent, Songa Lee-Kitto, Natalia Leggett, Demitri Leivici, Cynthia Moussas, Alyssa Park, Sara Parkins, Michele Richards, Anatoly Rosinsky, Haim Shtrum, Tereza Stanislav, Josefena Vergera, John Wittenberg, Kenneth Yerke

== Awards and nominations ==
Year	Award show	Category	Nominated work	Result	Ref
2006	Satellite Awards	Best Original Song	"Listen"	Nominated	
2006	Satellite Awards	Best Original Song	"Love You I Do"	Nominated	
2007	Academy Awards	Best Original Song	"Listen"	Nominated	
2007	Academy Awards	Best Original Song	"Patience"	Nominated	
2007	Academy Awards	Best Original Song	"Love You I Do"	Nominated	
2007	American Music Award	Favorite Soundtrack		Nominated	
2007	Black Reel Awards	Best Original Song	"Listen"	Nominated	
2007	Black Reel Awards	Best Original Song	"And I Am Telling You I'm Not Going"	Won	
2007	Black Reel Awards	Best Original Song	"One Night Only"	Nominated	
2007	Black Reel Awards	Best Original Soundtrack		Won	
2007	Broadcast Film Critics Association	Best Song	"Listen"	Won	
2007	Broadcast Film Critics Association	Best Original Soundtrack		Won	
2007	Golden Globe Award	Best Original Song	"Listen"	Nominated	
2007	NAACP Image Award	Outstanding Album		Won	
2008	Grammy Award	Best Compilation Soundtrack for Visual Media		Nominated	
2008	Grammy Award	Best Song Written for Visual Media	"Love You I Do"	Won	
2008	Japan Gold Disc Awards	Soundtrack Album of the Year		Won	

== Charts ==
=== Weekly charts ===
Chart (2006–07)	Peak position
Australian Albums (ARIA)	15
Austrian Albums (Ö3 Austria)	19
Belgian Albums (Ultratop Flanders)	44
Dutch Albums (Album Top 100)	22
French Albums (SNEP)	65
German Albums (Offizielle Top 100)	28
Hungarian Albums (MAHASZ)	5
Spanish Albums (Promusicae)	55
Swedish Albums (Sverigetopplistan)	32
Swiss Albums (Schweizer Hitparade)	24
UK Album Downloads (Official Charts)	20
UK R&B Albums (Official Charts)	8
UK Soundtrack Albums (Official Charts)	2
US Billboard 200	1
US Top R&B/Hip-Hop Albums (Billboard)	1
US Soundtrack Albums (Billboard)	1

=== Year-end charts ===
Chart (2007)	Position
US Billboard 200	41
US Top R&B/Hip-Hop Albums (Billboard)	16
US Soundtrack Albums (Billboard)	5

== Certifications ==
Region	Certification	Certified units/sales
Japan (RIAJ)	Gold	100,000^{^}
United Kingdom (BPI)	Gold	100,000^{^}
United States (RIAA)	Platinum	1,186,422
^{^} Shipments figures based on certification alone.

== See also ==
- List of Billboard 200 number-one albums of 2007
