= Patience (Dreamgirls song) =

Song by Eddie Murphy, Anika Noni Rose, and Keith Robinson

from the album Dreamgirls: Music from the Motion Picture
- Released: December 5, 2006
- Recorded: The Underlab, Los Angeles
- Genre: Soul; R&B
- Length: 2:49
- Label: Music World; Columbia
- Composer: Willie Reale
- Lyricists: Henry Krieger; Willie Reale
- Producer: The Underdogs

"Patience" is a song written by Henry Krieger and Willie Reale for the 2006 film Dreamgirls. The movie is an adaptation of the musical of the same name, which made its debut on Broadway in December 1981. The R&B track has been incorporated to more recent revivals of the stage drama, with "Patience" being one of several elements crossing from the adaptation to its parent production.

Within the context of the film, the social protest song is spearheaded by star performer James "Thunder" Early (played by Eddie Murphy) only for its release to get killed by the hustling record business figure Curtis Taylor, Jr. (played by Jamie Foxx). Movie critic Peter Rainer of the Christian Science Monitor remarked that the emotional scene displayed "Murphy at his best." Similar praise came from David Rooney of Variety.

Although nominated for the Academy Award for Best Original Song at the 79th Academy Awards.

== Background and critical responses ==
"Patience" didn't exist during the creation of the original Dreamgirls musical, a stage drama which made its debut on Broadway in December 1981. Songwriters Henry Krieger and Willie Reale devised "Patience" for the musical's 2006 movie adaptation, which also featured the title Dreamgirls. The r&b track has been incorporated to more recent revivals of the stage drama, with "Patience" being one of several elements crossing from the adaptation to its parent production.

The socially-charged lyrics and impassioned singing behind the song make it an inspirational piece of protest music meant to evoke the 70s-era musical work of artists such as Donny Hathaway, Marvin Gaye, and Stevie Wonder. "Patience" is performed both in the film and on its related soundtrack by the trio of Eddie Murphy, Anika Noni Rose, and Keith Robinson. It was Record producer by The Underdogs.

In the context of the film, "Patience" is a politically-charged piece written by talented singer-songwriter C.C. White (played by Robinson) and recorded by star performer James "Thunder" Early (played by Murphy) coupled with vocalist Lorrell Robinson (played by Rose) and a gospel choir. In a scene set in 1973, the song comes into being after Early seeks to develop his public image while being under the thumb of manipulative, shady record business figure Curtis Taylor, Jr. (played by Jamie Foxx). Much to the chagrin of his employees, Foxx's character axes the song's release. This feeds into the flashes of anxiety and depression suffered by Murphy's character, which he self-medicates through illicit drug use.

"Patience" was one of three Dreamgirls songs nominated for the Academy Award for Best Original Song at the 79th Academy Awards. The others were "Love You I Do" and "Listen". All three Dreamgirls songs (as well as the piece "Our Town" that Randy Newman penned for Cars) lost the Oscar to "I Need to Wake Up" by Melissa Etheridge, which the songwriter created for An Inconvenient Truth.

At the 2007 Academy Awards ceremony, "Patience" was performed by Rose and Robinson along with a gospel choir and their co-stars Beyoncé Knowles and Jennifer Hudson.

Film critics who viewed the song's creation and use in Dreamgirls as a highlight of the movie include Peter Rainer of the Christian Science Monitor and David Rooney of Variety. Rainer commented that the emotional scene displayed "Murphy at his best."

== See also ==
- Social protest music
  - "A Change Is Gonna Come"
  - "Heaven Help Us All"
  - "Someday We'll All Be Free"
  - "What's Going On"
