= Love You I Do =

- "Love You I Do" cover

Song by Jennifer Hudson

from the album Dreamgirls: Music from the Motion Picture
- Released: December 5, 2006
- Recorded: The Underlab, Los Angeles
- Genre: R&B; soul
- Length: 2:49
- Label: Music World; Columbia
- Songwriter(s): Henry Krieger; Siedah Garrett
- Producer(s): The Underdogs

"Love You I Do" is a song recorded by American singer and actress Jennifer Hudson for the soundtrack of the 2006 musical film Dreamgirls. The music for the song was written by Henry Krieger, composer of the original Broadway play, with lyrics by Siedah Garrett. It is one of the four songs featured in the film that are not present in the original Broadway play. It was nominated for the 2007 Academy Award for Best Original Song, and won the 2008 Grammy Award for Best Song Written for a Motion Picture, Television or Other Visual Media.

== Song information ==
"Love You I Do" is a R&B and soul song inspired by the early 1960s work of female singers such as Aretha Franklin and Mary Wells.

In the context of the film, the song is performed in a scene set in 1963 by soul singer Effie White (Hudson), and expresses Effie's romantic feelings for her boyfriend and record label head, Curtis Taylor Jr. (Jamie Foxx). As do most songs in the movie version of "Dreamgirls," this song serves two purposes. Effie is performing the piece to Curtis for review, hoping it will win her a song of her own on a record instead of remaining a mere backup singer for Jimmy Early. The song also helps further illustrate Effie's feelings for Curtis, though he is clearly more interested in Deena Jones. It is highly likely that he is merely feigning love for Effie to control and manipulate her.

Produced by The Underdogs, "Love You I Do" was one of three Dreamgirls songs nominated for the Academy Award for Best Original Song at the 79th Academy Awards; the others were "Patience" and "Listen". At the Academy Awards ceremony, Hudson performed "Love You I Do" as a duet with her co-star, Beyoncé Knowles. All three songs lost to "I Need to Wake Up" by Melissa Etheridge from the film An Inconvenient Truth. American Idol finalist Jessica Sanchez covered this song on the show.

The song entered the UK charts at 80 in 2011 after a contestant 'John Wilding' performed the song for his audition for X Factor series 8.

== Charts ==
Chart (2011)	Peak position
UK Singles (OCC)	80
UK Hip Hop/R&B (OCC)	24
