= Brunman =

Brunman is a surname. Notable people with the surname include:

- Ernst Brunman (1886–1961), Swedish actor;
- Glen Brunman, American music executive.
