= Dreamgirls: Original Broadway Cast Album =

Dreamgirls (Original Broadway Cast Album)

Cast recording by Various Artists
- Released: April 14, 1982; October 11, 2006 (Re-issue)
- Recorded: 1982
- Genre: Broadway, R&B, soul, pop
- Length: 46:58
- Label: Geffen (Original); Decca Broadway (Reissue)
- Producer: David Foster

Dreamgirls: Original Broadway Cast Album is the cast album for the original Broadway production of the musical Dreamgirls, which debuted at the Imperial Theatre on December 20, 1981. Issued by David Geffen, a co-financier of the musical and later producer of its 2006 film adaptation, the album was released by his Geffen Records label on April 14, 1982. The cast album features performances by the show's performers, including Jennifer Holliday, Sheryl Lee Ralph, Loretta Devine, Ben Harney, Cleavant Derricks, Obba Babatundé, and Vondie Curtis-Hall.

== Album information ==
The cast album includes highlights from the musical's score; many numbers were truncated or excised in order to fit onto one long-playing vinyl record. A 2006 special edition remastered version, issued to tie-in with both the musical's 25th anniversary and the DreamWorks/Paramount-produced Dreamgirls feature film adaptation, adds three previously unissued tracks from the original recording sessions. Also included is a bonus disc featuring instrumental mixes (prepared for personal appearances by the cast) and a dance version of the musical's signature number, "And I Am Telling You I'm Not Going".

Pop music producer David Foster served as producer of the cast album, which peaked at #11 on the Billboard 200, while peaking at #4 on Billboard's Black Albums Chart. It is one of the highest charting Broadway Cast Recordings in history on the Billboard 200. In 1983, the album won the Grammy Award for Best Musical Show Album, and Jennifer Holliday received the Grammy Award for Best R&B Vocal Performance, Female for "And I Am Telling You I'm Not Going".

In 1993, the album was certified gold by the RIAA, and to date has sold over 500,000 copies in the US.

The special edition version of the cast album was issued by Decca Broadway and Hip-O Records on November 21, 2006. The dance remix of "And I Am Telling You..." was produced by Craig C.

Professional ratings
Review scores
| Source | Rating |
|---|---|
| Allmusic | link |

== Track listing ==
All songs written by Henry Krieger and Tom Eyen.

=== Side one ===
1. "Move (You're Steppin' on My Heart)" – 1:56
2. "Fake Your Way to the Top" – 2:27
3. "Cadillac Car" – 3:32
4. "Steppin' to the Bad Side" – 3:44
5. "Family" – 3:19
6. "Dreamgirls" – 3:14
7. "Press Conference – 1:40
8. "And I Am Telling You I'm Not Going" – 4:05

=== Side two ===
1. "Ain't No Party" – 2:08
2. "When I First Saw You" – 2:41
3. "I Am Changing" – 3:59
4. "I Meant You No Harm" – 1:05
5. "The Rap" – 1:41
6. "Firing of Jimmy" – 2:36
7. "I Miss You Old Friend" – 1:33
8. "One Night Only" – 3:42
9. "Hard to Say Goodbye, My Love" – 3:36

== 2006 Special Edition ==
All songs written by Henry Krieger and Tom Eyen.

=== Disc one ===
1. "Move (You're Steppin' on My Heart)"
2. "Fake Your Way to the Top"
3. "Cadillac Car"
4. "Steppin' to the Bad Side"
5. "Family"
6. "Dreamgirls"
7. "Press Conference"
8. "Driving Down the Strip" ^{1}
9. "It's All Over" ^{1}
10. "And I Am Telling You I'm Not Going"
11. "Ain't No Party"
12. "When I First Saw You"
13. "I Am Changing"
14. "I Meant You No Harm"
15. "The Rap"
16. "Firing of Jimmy"
17. "I Miss You Old Friend"
18. "One Night Only"
19. "Hard To Say Goodbye, My Love"
20. "Dreamgirls (Finale)" ^{1}

=== Disc two ===
1. "Cadillac Car" (Instrumental)
2. "Steppin' to the Bad Side" (Instrumental)
3. "Family" (Instrumental)
4. "Dreamgirls" (Instrumental)
5. "And I Am Telling You I'm Not Going" (Instrumental)
6. "When I First Saw You" (Instrumental)
7. "I Am Changing" (Instrumental)
8. "One Night Only" (Instrumental)
9. "Hard to Say Goodbye, My Love" (Instrumental)
10. "And I Am Telling You I'm Not Going" (Craig C. Club Mix)

Notes

- ^{1}: Previously unreleased

== Personnel ==
- "Move (You're Steppin' on My Heart)"

Jennifer Holliday, Sheryl Lee Ralph, Loretta Devine

- "Fake Your Way to the Top"

Cleavant Derricks, Loretta Devine, Jennifer Holliday, Sheryl Lee Ralph

- "Cadillac Car"

1st: Ben Harney, Cleavant Derricks, Obba Babatundé, and Vondie Curtis-Hall
2nd: Cleavant Derricks, Loretta Devine, Jennifer Holliday, Sheryl Lee Ralph, The Company
3rd: Paul Binotto, Candy Darling, Stephanie Eley

- "Steppin' to the Bad Side"

Ben Harney, Obba Babatundé, Tony Franklin, Cleavant Derricks, Loretta Devine, Jennifer Holliday, Sheryl Lee Ralph, The Company

- "Family"

Obba Babatundé, Jennifer Holliday, Sheryl Lee Ralph, Loretta Devine, Ben Harney

- "Dreamgirls"

Sheryl Lee Ralph, Jennifer Holliday, Loretta Devine

- "Press Conference"

The Company, Sheryl Lee Ralph, Ben Harney

- "Driving Down the Strip"

Cleavant Derricks

- "It's All Over"

Jennifer Holliday, Ben Harney, Sheryl Lee Ralph, Loretta Devine, Cleavant Derricks, Obba Babatundé, Deborah Burrell

- "And I Am Telling You I'm Not Going"

Jennifer Holliday

- "Ain't No Party"

Loretta Devine

- "When I First Saw You"

Ben Harney and Sheryl Lee Ralph

- "I Am Changing"

Jennifer Holliday

- "I Meant You No Harm"

Cleavant Derricks

- "The Rap"

Cleavant Derricks

- "Firing of Jimmy"

Cleavant Derricks, Ben Harney, Loretta Devine, The Company

- "I Miss You Old Friend"

Obba Babatundé, Jennifer Holliday

- "One Night Only"

Jennifer Holliday, Sheryl Lee Ralph, Loretta Devine, Deborah Burrell

- "Hard to Say Goodbye, My Love"

Sheryl Lee Ralph, Loretta Devine, Deborah Burrell

- "Dreamgirls (Finale)"

Jennifer Holliday, Sheryl Lee Ralph, Loretta Devine, Deborah Burrell

== Chart history ==
=== Album ===
| Chart (1982) | Peak position |
|---|---|
| U.S. Billboard 200 | 11 |
| U.S. Billboard R&B Albums Chart | 4 |

=== Songs ===
| Title | Chart (2006–2007) | Peak position |
|---|---|---|
| "And I Am Telling You I'm Not Going" | U.S. Billboard Hot 100 | 22 |
| "And I Am Telling You I'm Not Going" | U.S. Billboard Hot R&B Singles | 1 |
| "I Am Changing" | U.S. Billboard Hot R&B Singles | 29 |
| "When I First Saw You" | U.S. Billboard Hot R&B Singles | 50 |
