= And I Am Telling You I'm Not Going =

1982 single by Jennifer Holliday

"And I'm Telling You I'm Not Going"

Single by Jennifer Holliday

from the album Dreamgirls: Original Broadway Cast Album
- B-side: "Fake Your Way to the Top" by Cleavant Derricks, Loretta Devine, Jennifer Holliday, and Sheryl Lee Ralph
- Released: 1982
- Recorded: 1982
- Genre: Show tune; soul
- Length: 4:08
- Label: Geffen
- Songwriters: Tom Eyen; Henry Krieger
- Producer: David Foster

Jennifer Holliday singles chronology
"And I'm Telling You I'm Not Going" (1982)	"I Am Changing" (1982)

Audio
- "And I Am Telling You I'm Not Going" by Jennifer Holliday on YouTube

"And I Am Telling You I'm Not Going" (also known in short as just "And I Am Telling You") is a torch song from the Broadway musical Dreamgirls, with lyrics by Tom Eyen and music by Henry Krieger. In the context of the musical, "And I Am Telling You I'm Not Going" is sung by the character Effie White, a singer with the girl group The Dreams, to her manager, Curtis Taylor Jr., whose romantic and professional relationship with Effie is ending. The lyrics to "And I Am Telling You I'm Not Going", often considered the show's signature tune, describe Effie's love for Curtis, both strongly devoted and defiant. She refuses to let Curtis leave her behind, and boldly proclaims to him, "I'm staying and you ... you're gonna love me."

In addition to its presence in the musical, "And I Am Telling You I'm Not Going" is also notable as the debut single of two women who portrayed Effie. Jennifer Holliday originated the role on Broadway in 1981 and won a Tony Award for Best Actress in a Musical for the role as well as the Grammy for Best Female R&B Vocal Performance for its re-release in 1982 for which it became a number-one R&B hit for Holliday. Jennifer Hudson portrayed Effie in the 2006 film adaptation of the musical, winning the Academy Award for Best Supporting Actress for her performance. Hudson's version became a Top 20 R&B single, and a number-one dance hit.

== Jennifer Holliday version ==
In 1982, Jennifer Holliday, the actress who portrayed Effie in the original Broadway production, released the song as a single. It was her first single release and it met with great success, topping the Billboard R&B charts and attaining top forty positions on both the Billboard Hot 100 and the UK Singles Chart. In 1983, Holliday won the Grammy Award for Best R&B Vocal Performance, Female for the single.

"And I Am Telling You I'm Not Going" was designed as the closing number of Dreamgirls' first act. Holliday's performance of the song, in a style owing much to gospel music singing traditions, was regularly staged to thunderous applause; it was hailed as the highlight of the show in several printed reviews of the musical. In his review of Dreamgirls, The New York Times theatre critic Frank Rich referred to Holliday's "And I Am Telling You" as "one of the most powerful theatrical coups to be found in a Broadway musical since Ethel Merman sang 'Everything's Coming Up Roses' at the end of Act I of Gypsy" "And I Am Telling You I'm Not Going" remains Holliday's signature song.

=== Charts ===
Chart (1982)	Peak position
Canada Adult Contemporary (RPM)	7
Ireland (IRMA)	23
UK Singles (Official Charts)	32
US Billboard Hot 100	22
US Hot R&B/Hip-Hop Songs (Billboard)	1

Rosabel with Jennifer Holliday version

Chart (2001)	Peak position
US Dance Club Songs (Billboard)	6
US Billboard Hot 100 Singles Sales	66

Chart (2007)	Peak position
US Hot Dance Club Play (Billboard)	10

== Donna Giles version ==
"And I'm Telling You I'm Not Going"

Single by Donna Giles
- Released: 1994; 1996 (re-release)
- Genre: House
- Length: 4:29
- Label: Ore Music; Club Vision Recordings; Downtown 161; D:vision; Feel The Rhythm; ZYX Music
- Songwriters: Tom Eyen; Henry Krieger
- Producer: Eve Nelson

In 1994, American drag queen Donna Giles scored a minor club hit in the US and UK with her rendition of "And I'm Telling You I'm Not Going". The track remained a sleeper club hit in the UK throughout 1995, prompting a spate of re-releases and remixes, including Stonebridge, culminating in a major release on Ore Records in 1996. This last release would finally take the track to number 27 on the UK Singles Chart in February of that year. On November 20, 2007, the original master, produced by critically acclaimed Eve Nelson, was released digitally by Breaking Records and is available on all major download sites.

=== Critical reception ===
Andy Beevers from Music Week gave Giles' version a score of four out of five, writing, "This is a defiant last stand from the transexual vocalist who died from AIDS earlier this year. Her impassioned delivery of the Jennifer Holliday song over a range of strong club mixes from Loveland, Stonebridge and Johnny Vicious has been a big club chart hit and should sell pretty well."

=== Track listing ===
- 12-inch single, UK (1994)

A1. "And I'm Telling You I'm Not Going" (Pride Mix) — 7:06
A2. "And I'm Telling You I'm Not Going" (Orecapella) — 1:23
AA1. "And I'm Telling You I'm Not Going" (Stonebridge Poppers Full Delight Mix) — 7:09
AA2. "And I'm Telling You I'm Not Going" (Loveland Full On Vocal Mix) — 7:18

- CD single, UK (1994)
1. "And I'm Telling You I'm Not Going" (Stonebridge Radio Edit) — 4:29
2. "And I'm Telling You I'm Not Going" (Loveland Full-On Vocal Mix) — 7:19
3. "And I'm Telling You I'm Not Going" (Johnny Vicious Mix) — 7:19
4. "And I'm Telling You I'm Not Going" (Orecapella) — 1:24
5. "And I'm Telling You I'm Not Going" (Stonebridge Poppers Full Delight Mix) — 7:05
- CD maxi-single, Sweden (1994)
1. "And I'm Telling You I'm Not Going" (Poppers 7" Delight) — 4:35
2. "And I'm Telling You I'm Not Going" (Poppers Full Delight) — 6:33
3. "And I'm Telling You I'm Not Going" (Donna God/The Pride Mix) — 7:06
4. "And I'm Telling You I'm Not Going" (Loveland Full-On Vocal Mix) — 7:16
5. "And I'm Telling You I'm Not Going" (Johnny Vicious Bootay Dub) — 7:14
6. "And I'm Telling You I'm Not Going" (Kerri's Organized Mix) — 6:23
- CD maxi-single, France (1994)
1. "And I'm Telling You (I'm Not Going)" (Poppers 7" Delight) — 4:35
2. "And I'm Telling You (I'm Not Going)" (Poppers Full Delight) — 6:33
3. "And I'm Telling You (I'm Not Going)" (Golden Dinner Accadubba) — 7:04
4. "And I'm Telling You (I'm Not Going)" (Kerri's Organized Mix) — 6:23
5. "And I'm Telling You (I'm Not Going)" (Moovay Ya Bootay Mix) — 7:07
6. "And I'm Telling You (I'm Not Going)" (Moovay Ya Bootay Dub) — 7:14

=== Charts ===
Chart (1994)	Peak position
Scotland (OCC)	63
UK Singles (OCC)	43
UK Dance (OCC)	2
UK Club Chart (Music Week)	1

Chart (1996)	Peak position
Scotland (OCC)	30
UK Singles (OCC)	27
UK Dance (OCC)	3
UK Club Chart (Music Week)	7

== Jennifer Hudson version ==
"And I Am Telling You I'm Not Going"

Single by Jennifer Hudson

from the album Dreamgirls: Music from the Motion Picture
- Released: December 5, 2006
- Recorded: March 2006
- Studio: The Underlab (Los Angeles)
- Genre: Soul
- Length: 4:45 (highlights version); 5:06 (soundtrack version)
- Label: Music World; Columbia
- Songwriters: Tom Eyen; Henry Krieger
- Producer: The Underdogs

Jennifer Hudson singles chronology
"And I Am Telling You I'm Not Going" (2006)	"Spotlight" (2008)

Audio
- "And I Am Telling You I'm Not Going" by Jennifer Hudson on YouTube

In 2006, "And I Am Telling You I'm Not Going" was recorded by Jennifer Hudson for her film debut as Effie White, in the DreamWorks/Paramount motion picture adaptation of Dreamgirls. Her recording of the song peaked at number 60 on the US Billboard Hot 100 chart, and number 14 on the R&B chart.

Hudson's version received widespread praise from film and music critics as well as the audiences, which highlighted her strength as both a vocalist and an actress. The New York Observer described Hudson's performance as "five mellifluous, molto vibrato minutes...." Newsweek said that when moviegoers hear Hudson sing the song, she "is going to raise goose bumps across the land." Variety wrote that Hudson's performance "calls to mind debuts like Barbra Streisand in Funny Girl or Bette Midler in The Rose, with a voice like the young Aretha." For her performance, Hudson won a multitude of accolades, including the Academy Award for Best Supporting Actress. The song also appeared in Hudson's eponymous debut album (2008).

On June 26, 2007, the 7th Annual BET Awards opened with Jennifer Holliday and Jennifer Hudson performing "And I Am Telling You I'm Not Going" live in their first duet together.

Although it in essence is Hudson's first single release, it became her fourth top 75 hit in the United Kingdom after a performance on The X Factor in 2009 after being sung by Danyl Johnson. Hudson performed the song again at the 85th Academy Awards, as part of the Dreamgirls section in the tribute to movie musicals.

In February 2022, Hudson's rendition was named a finalist for Oscars Cheer Moment as part of the Academy of Motion Picture Arts and Sciences' "Oscars Fan Favorite" contest, finishing in fourth place.

=== Dance remix ===
A club remix was created for this single, engineered by Richie Jones and Eric Kupper, and appears as a bonus track on the "Deluxe Edition" of the Dreamgirls soundtrack album. This version of Hudson's "And I Am Telling You" was a chart success, reaching the top of the Billboard Hot Dance Club Play chart in early 2007. A shortened edit of the full remix appeared on a Columbia Records promotional-only CD accompanying the Jones & Kupper remix of another Dreamgirls song, the Beyoncé Knowles/Anika Noni Rose/Sharon Leal/Jennifer Hudson rendition of "One Night Only". Also included were the Freemasons remixes of Beyoncé's singles "Déjà Vu" and "Ring the Alarm".

=== Charts ===
==== Weekly charts ====
Chart (2006–2007)	Peak position
US Billboard Hot 100	60
US Hot R&B/Hip-Hop Songs (Billboard)	14
US Dance Club Songs (Billboard)	1
US Pop 100 (Billboard)	70

Chart (2009)	Peak position
Ireland (IRMA)	37
Scottish Singles Sales (Official Charts)	32
UK Singles (Official Charts)	32
UK Hip Hop/R&B (Official Charts)	12

==== Year-end charts ====
Chart (2007)	Position
US Hot R&B/Hip-Hop Songs (Billboard)	66

== Other notable versions ==
Whitney Houston performed the song as part of a medley with "I Loves You, Porgy" and "I Have Nothing" at the 1994 American Music Awards of 1994. This performance is included on her posthumous 2014 CD/DVD release, Live: Her Greatest Performances, and was re-enacted by Naomi Ackie as Houston in the 2022 film Whitney Houston: I Wanna Dance with Somebody. Houston also performed the tune as part of the set list during The Bodyguard World Tour in 1993.

In an episode of The Fresh Prince of Bel-Air, Will (Will Smith) serenades Uncle Phil to the song by lip-syncing it when trying to win his forgiveness but only ends up annoying him.

In an episode of Martin, Gina (Tisha Campbell) performs the song while interrupting Pam's performance of the song "Home" (from The Wiz) on Martin's talk show "Word on the Street". As both are auditioning for Biggie Smalls, they attempt to out-sing each other, ultimately resulting in embarrassing Martin.

In 1998, Jim Carrey flamboyantly performed a parody of the song in the final episode of The Larry Sanders Show (entitled "Flip"), pleading to the titular Sanders to persuade him not to leave his late-night talk show.

In the 2001 film Down to Earth, the song is performed by several people at the Apollo Theater, with the audience only approving when sung by Phil Quon (John Cho).

Various renditions appear in several episodes of the sitcom Everybody Hates Chris, often sung by Chris' mother Rochelle (Tichina Arnold), or by off-screen performers watched by Rochelle.

In 2006, then 11-year-old Bianca Ryan auditioned with the song for America's Got Talent. Ryan subsequently won the contest that year.

Jake Gyllenhaal performed it on Saturday Night Live shortly after the film's release in a pastiche of Hudson. He wore a wig and black sequined dress, with three of the female regulars on SNL as his "backup singers", dressed in red glitter dresses, heels and wigs.

In 2009, it was performed by Amber Riley as her character Mercedes Jones in the first season Glee episode "Sectionals". Riley would go on to play Effie onstage in the 2016 London's West End first production of Dreamgirls, with a live cast recording of the show featuring the song being released in May 2017.

Also in 2009, the parody film Dance Flick features David Alan Grier performing a version of the song telling the protagonists that they're "gonna feed [him]" with assorted foods and name brand items.

American Idol runner-up Jessica Sanchez performed the song as one of her two songs in the Top 4. Her performance during the Top 4 was praised by Jennifer Holliday. Holliday later performed the song with Sanchez during the eleventh season finale in 2012.

Dami Im, the 2013 winner of the Australian version of The X Factor, performed this as one of her final three songs. Her performance received a rapturous response from all four judges and the audience. The judges stood up on the judges table as an indication of their overwhelming adulation of her exquisite performance while the audience applauded strongly for 70 seconds. Her performance debuted number 29 on the Australian ARIA Charts. On December 1, 2013, Im released a version of the song as part of her self-titled album, which debuted at number one in Australia, and was certified Platinum.

Also in 2013, Sam Bailey performed it with Nicole Scherzinger as her celebrity duet choice during the first part of the tenth-season finale of The X Factor in the UK. The duet also appeared on her 2014 debut album The Power of Love.

Also in 2013, Jacquie Lee performed this song in season 5 of The Voice.

Also in 2013, actor/singer Tituss Burgess performed a rendition at the event "Broadway Backwards" for the charity Broadway Cares/Equity Fights AIDS.

In 2015, Louisa Johnson performed this song both in the six chair challenge and with Rita Ora as her celebrity duet choice during the first part of the twelfth-season finale of The X Factor in the UK.

In 2016, Chi Chi DeVayne and Thorgy Thor lipsynced to the song on the eighth season of RuPaul's Drag Race. The performance, specifically from DeVayne, was viewed as the best lipsync of the season and one of the best in the franchise's history.

In Britain's Got Talent 2017, Sarah Ikumu sang this song as her audition. It won her the Golden Buzzer from Simon Cowell, which got her an unchallenged pass into the live finals.

In 2020, Destiny Chukunyere performed it as her Big Band choice during the semifinals of the second season of X Factor Malta.

In 2025, Cynthia Erivo sang a version of the song at the conclusion of the 78th Tony Awards, with lyrics altered to reference the awards.

In 2026, Bowen Yang performed a parody of the song on Saturday Night Live about the inconveniences of traveling by the Lincoln Tunnel, dressed as Mary Todd Lincoln, the character he plays on the Broadway musical Oh, Mary!, and the wife of the namesake of the tunnel, Abraham Lincoln.

== See also ==
- List of number-one dance singles of 2007 (U.S.)
