= Listen (Beyoncé song) =

2007 song by Beyoncé Knowles

Single by Beyoncé

from the album Dreamgirls: Music from the Motion Picture
- Released: January 19, 2007
- Recorded: 2006
- Studio: The Underlab (Los Angeles); Sony Music Studios (New York City)
- Genre: Soul; R&B
- Length: 3:39
- Label: Music World; Columbia
- Songwriters: Beyoncé Knowles; Henry Krieger; Scott Cutler; Anne Preven
- Producer: The Underdogs

Beyoncé singles chronology
"Irreplaceable" (2006)	"Listen" (2007)	"Hollywood" (2007)

Dreamgirls singles chronology
"One Night Only" (2006)	"Listen" (2007)	"And I Am Telling You I'm Not Going" (2007)

Audio video
- "Listen" on YouTube

"Listen" is a song recorded by American singer Beyoncé. The song was written by Beyoncé, Henry Krieger, Scott Cutler and Anne Preven, and produced by The Underdogs, Matt Sullivan and Randy Spendlove for the 2006 musical film Dreamgirls, in which Beyoncé's character Deena Jones sings the song in an expression of independence from her controlling husband. Columbia Records released "Listen" as the lead single from the Dreamgirls: Music from the Motion Picture soundtrack album on January 19, 2007. It additionally appeared as a hidden track on international editions, and on the deluxe edition of Beyoncé's second solo studio album, B'Day. The Spanish version of the song, "Oye", was released on the EP, Irreemplazable, and the Spanish deluxe edition of B'Day.

One of four new songs written for the feature version of Dreamgirls (originally a 1981 Broadway musical), "Listen" is a soul-R&B power ballad; its lyrics make reference to tenacity, love, the refusal to defer dreams and finally rise towards fame. Its instrumentation includes bass, drums, guitars, keyboards, percussion, and violins, among others. Contemporary music critics complimented the strong and emotional vocals of Beyoncé, and added that the lyrics perfectly elaborate on Deena Jones's life. "Listen" won Best Original Song at the 2007 Critics' Choice Awards. It was nominated in the same category at the 2006 International Press Academy Satellite Award, at the 2007 Golden Globe Awards for all songwriters, and at the 2007 Academy Awards, for songwriters Krieger, Cutler and Preven.

"Listen" peaked at number 61 on the US Billboard Hot 100 chart and generally peaked inside the top 20 positions in European countries. In the United Kingdom, the song reached number eight, following a live duet performance of Beyoncé and Alexandra Burke at The X Factor, where Burke emerged as the winner after singing "Listen" during the finale. Furthermore, the song peaked at number three in Italy. The song was covered by Jake Zyrus during the second-season premiere of Glee and Melanie Amaro during the finale of the first season of The X Factor in the US, where she emerged as the winner. Two accompanying music videos were filmed for "Listen"; the performance version was directed by Diane Martel, and the second one, being Vogue Shoot Version, was directed by Matthew Rolston. "Listen" was also a part of her set list on The Beyoncé Experience (2007) and the I Am... World Tour (2009–10).

== Context ==
In the film version of Dreamgirls, Beyoncé portrays the character of Deena Jones, a pop singer loosely based on Motown star Diana Ross. The story explores the life of The Dreams (based on The Supremes), a fictional 1960s group of three female singers: Effie White (Jennifer Hudson), Deena Jones and Lorrell Robinson (Anika Noni Rose), whose manager Curtis Taylor (based on Berry Gordy and played by Jamie Foxx) manipulates their personal and professional relationships.

During the second half of the film, Curtis and Deena argue at dinner over Deena's desire to make her film debut in an urban film instead of the Cleopatra prequel that Curtis is producing. An angry Curtis asserts his creative and psychological control over his wife, informing Deena that he would not let anyone else "handle" her, because, in his words, "no one knows you the way I do". Curtis tells Deena that he put Deena as lead singer of the Dreams because her voice "had no personality. No depth. Except for what [he] put in there".

In the context of the film, "Listen" is a 1975 song that Deena records on Rainbow Records, a recording empire established by Curtis. She is actually recording the song in a booth as a track, but the song also reveals Deena's growing disgust at being considered merely Curtis' property. Used in the film as a last-minute recording by Deena before leaving Curtis "to find her own voice as a newly independent woman", co-writer Anne Preven called "Listen" a song which "Deena is exclaiming, 'You don't know who I am, and I know I do.'"

== Production and composition ==
"Listen"
A 22-second sample of the chorus of "Listen", demonstrating the strong and emotional vocals of Knowles

While working on the script adaptation for Dreamgirls, screenwriter/director Bill Condon felt the second half of the film needed a song. The "emotional punch" of "And I Am Telling You I'm Not Going" led him to ask the musical team for Dreamgirls "to create a new and equally moving song to energize the second act". Led by Henry Krieger, the composer of the original 1981 Broadway musical version of Dreamgirls, "Listen" was written with help from Scott Cutler, Preven, and Beyoncé; it was one of four songs written for the film version of Dreamgirls. "Listen" was produced by the R&B-pop production duo The Underdogs.

"Listen" is a soul-R&B ballad, which is written in the key of B major, and set in common time at a moderately slow groove of 62 beats per minute. Beyoncé's vocals range from the low note of F♯_{3} to the high note of F♯_{5}. The song's music takes its instrumentation from the bass, celli, drums, guitars, keyboards, percussion, violas, and violins. According to Sarah Rodman of The Boston Globe, its lyrics make reference to tenacity, love, and the refusal to defer dreams; Beyoncé, as the female protagonist, sings, "demanding her moment in the sun". Chuck Taylor of Billboard magazine wrote that Beyoncé shimmers "with evocative emotion", rising to new heights alongside "a golden melody with spellbinding, rafter-raising production". The lyrics are written in the traditional verse-chorus form. The song starts with the lines: "Listen to the song here in my heart, a melody I start but can't complete". A bridge follows after repeating the pattern and ends in another chorus.

== Release ==
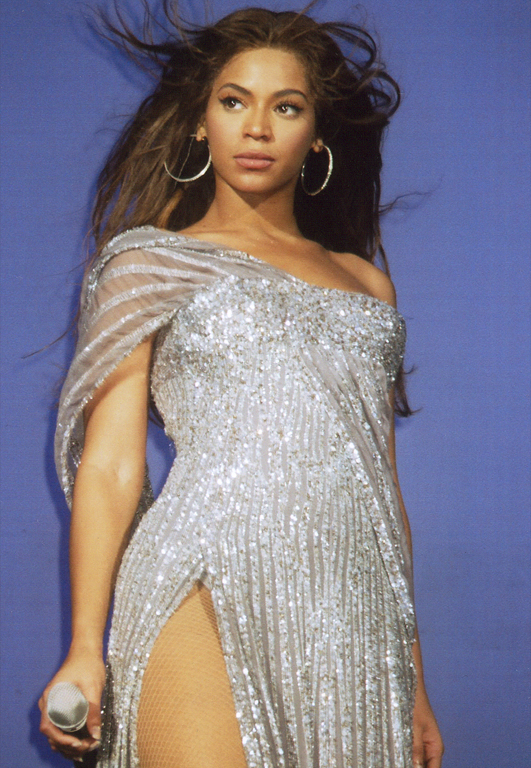
Beyoncé performing "Listen" during The Beyoncé Experience in Munich, Germany.

"Listen" was released as the lead single from the soundtrack album Dreamgirls: Music from the Motion Picture. Beyoncé recorded an introduction to "Listen" entitled "Encore to the Fans"; the song alongside its introduction is featured on international editions of Beyoncé's second album B'Day as a hidden track. A Spanish version titled "Oye" was produced and released on the deluxe edition of B'Day. On January 29, 2007, "Listen" was released as a CD single, containing its album and instrumental versions, in the United States. On January 19, 2007, it was serviced as a CD single in the United Kingdom, and several European countries, where a remix produced by Fraser T. Smith was later released on March 9, 2007.

== Critical reception ==
"Listen" scored generally positive reviews from contemporary music critics. A reviewer from Pitchfork stated that "when Beyoncé belts out the chorus, the inspiration is real, tangible, and contagious". Describing the song as a "devastatingly beautiful ballad", Chuck Taylor of Billboard magazine wrote, "Beyoncé delivers the performance of her career, another defining moment in the brilliant flick [besides Hudson's 'And I Am Telling You I'm Not Going']." Peter Travers of Rolling Stone noted that the song "adds grit and touching gravity to Deena". Another reviewer of the same publication called the song "epic" noting that Beyoncé "unfurls the true range of her magnificent voice". Comparing the song to Andrew Lloyd Webber's "piano weepie[s]", a writer of The Observer stated that "Listen" is a "bangers-to-ballads ratio to die for". Calling the song a "showstopper", Sarah Rodman of The Boston Globe wrote: "['Listen'] is a big, soppy ballad that will move some to tears and irk others as a stunning example of art imitating life imitating art without a shred of irony." Sal Cinquemani of Slant Magazine said that "Listen" will undoubtedly be "the payoff for fans of Beyoncé's voice who sat through the first [thirty-eight] minutes of [B'Day] waiting for the cum shot." By contrast, Jody Rosen's review for Entertainment Weekly was less impressed, describing "Listen" as "gloopy" and "an inspirational ballad about 'the song in my heart', which builds to an enormous schlock-opera climax".

== Accolades ==
"Listen" was nominated for Best Original Song at the 2006 International Press Academy Satellite Award and in 2007 at the Golden Globe Awards and at the Academy Awards. Also in 2007, Dreamgirls received seven nominations at the 12th Annual Critics' Choice Awards, where the film won four awards, including Best Original Song for "Listen". At the Academy Awards, Beyoncé was not listed as one of the honorees. She is officially one of the four writers of the song, but as per Academy Rule 16, only three major contributors of a song are eligible. The executive committee of the organization had determined, during their meeting in December of the same year, that Beyoncé's contribution was the smallest.

== Commercial performance ==
"Listen" entered and left the UK Singles Chart on three separate occasions, In February 2007, it entered at number 60 and peaked at number 16 on March 3, 2007 before leaving the chart on March 24, 2007. On December 4, 2008, Alexandra Burke performed the song in the final 5 week of The X Factor,' prompting the song to re-enter the UK Singles Chart at number fifty-three, which is a higher position than it reached in the United States on initial release, where it peaked at 61. In the finale of The X Factor, Burke, who would become the winner, performed "Listen" as a duet with Beyoncé. Accordingly, the song surged from number 60 to number eight on the UK Singles Chart on December 27, 2008, selling 28,000 copies. The following week, "Listen" fell to number 30; it remained in the top 40 for two additional weeks. As of December 2008, sales of the single stood close to 120,000 copies in the United Kingdom alone. "Listen" last re-entered the UK Singles Chart on November 14, 2009 at number 84. In 2012, the song reached number seven on the UK R&B Singles Chart, peaking at number five the following year. As of July 2013, the single has sold around 300,000 units in the UK. It peaked at number three in Italy.

== Music videos ==
Two music videos exist for "Listen", the first being a performance one and the second being a Vogue Shoot. The first music video premiered on MTV's Making the Video on November 28, 2006. The other music video was released online and through the Dreamgirls DVD special features.

=== Performance Version ===
This video, which was directed by Diane Martel, features Beyoncé walking through a performance hall in modern-day street clothes, performing the song. Once she arrives onstage and at the song's bridge, she appears in costume as Deena, dressed in a 1970s-era gown. Intercut into the video are scenes from Dreamgirls, most of which depict Deena's relationship with Curtis. These clips, however, were taken out in the director's cut version of the video; this version appeared on the B'Day Anthology Video Album. In her first outfit, Beyoncé is seen wearing a Wonder Woman T-shirt.

=== Vogue Shoot Version ===
The music video, directed by Matthew Rolston, features Beyoncé wearing a modern-day tank top, performing the song against a blank background which changes back and forth between white and black. Interspersed are some scenes from a photo shoot within her film Dreamgirls. This version appears on the Dreamgirls DVD release. In the director's cut of this version, Beyoncé is seen posing for a photo shoot not featured in the film in which she wears very outlandish clothing. As the shoot progresses it becomes more and more evident that Beyoncé is not happy with the direction of the shoot and when she is handed a bird to pose with she becomes fed up, walks away and strips down to the black tank top and tights underneath. She then climbs the staircase of the building to the rooftop and finishes singing the song.

== Live performances ==
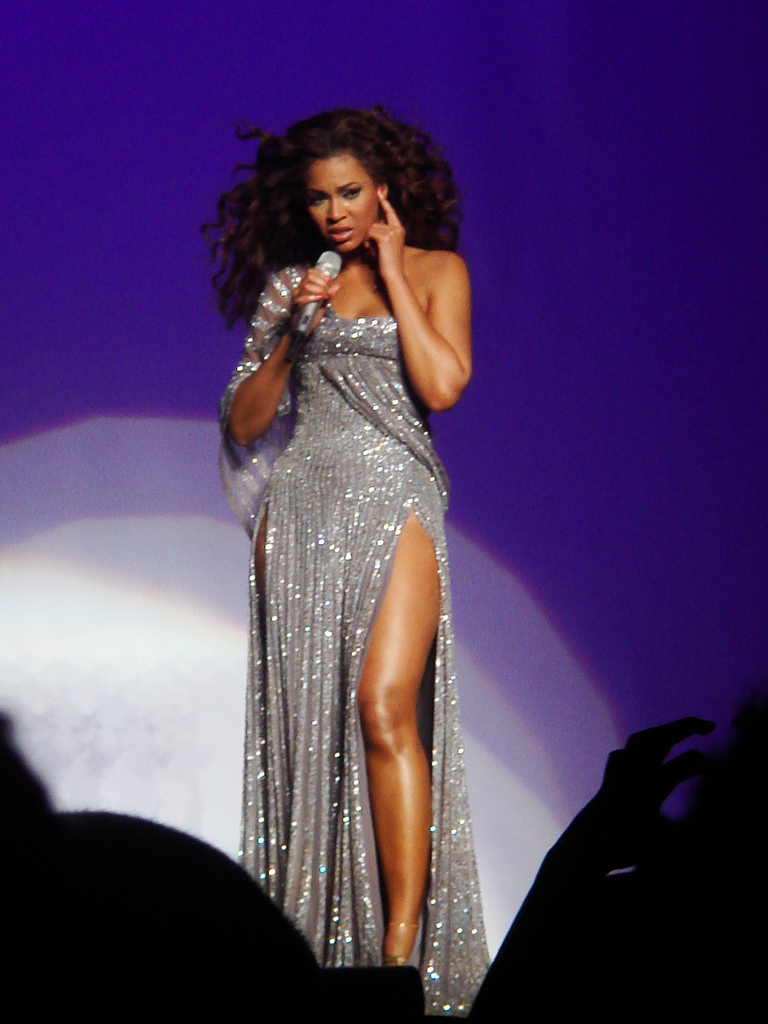
Beyoncé performing "Listen" during The Beyoncé Experience concert tour.

Beyoncé first performed "Listen" on the Oprah Winfrey show and received a standing ovation from her cast members, the audience, and left Oprah speechless. Upon the song's completion, Oprah simply exclaimed, "Wow." The second performance was at the 49th Grammy Awards held at the Staples Center, in Los Angeles, California, on February 11, 2007. MTV News' staff members coined it as the Best Oscar Performance, writing: "Beyoncé killed it with a passionate performance of 'Listen'." Beyoncé later performed "Listen" with Alexandra Burke on December 13, 2008, at the final of The X Factor, with Burke having performed the song alone two weeks previously. Burke battled to control her emotions when Beyoncé joined her on stage and dissolved into tears when their duet was over. Burke went on to win the competition later that night. Barbara Ellen of The Observer praised Beyoncé's performance of the song saying that "there seemed something a little overpowering, invulnerable, dare I say, ungenerous, about Beyoncé – almost as if she were a giant slithering diva/snake hell bent on swallowing poor quivering Burke whole."

In addition, "Listen" was a part of Beyoncé's set list on The Beyoncé Experience and I Am... World Tour. On August 5, 2007, Beyoncé performed the song at the Madison Square Garden in Manhattan. Jon Pareles of The New York Times praised the performance, stating: "Beyoncé needs no distractions from her singing, which can be airy or brassy, tearful or vicious, rapid-fire with staccato syllables or sustained in curlicued melismas. But she was in constant motion, strutting in costumes." In Los Angeles, Beyoncé performed the song, dressed in a glittering silver dress with mink fur. It was executed without any backup dancers, and live instrumentation. Jim Farber of Daily News noted that during the performance of the song at the I Am... World Tour, Beyoncé blended her alter ego Sasha Fierce's potent and her own pained personality and added that "those two emotions made this Beyoncé's greatest live moment" When Beyoncé performed the song in Sunrise, Florida, on June 29, 2009, she was wearing a glittery gold leotard. As she sang, animated graphics of turntables, faders and other club equipment were projected behind Beyoncé, her dancers and musicians. Beyoncé was accompanied by her two drummers, two keyboardists, a percussionist, a horn section, three imposing backup vocalists called the Mamas and a lead guitarist, Bibi McGill. "Listen" was included as on her live albums The Beyoncé Experience Live (2007), and the I Am... World Tour (2010).

== Cover versions ==
=== Dreamgirls stage revival version ===
A modified version of "Listen", with new lyrics by Willie Reale, was added to the song score of the 2009 touring revival of the stage version of Dreamgirls. This version presents the song as a duet between the characters Deena and Effie, as Effie explains to Deena that she must leave Curtis and gives her advice on how to find her independence. The revised version of the stage musical, and the new version of "Listen", debuted at the Apollo Theater in Harlem, New York on November 22, 2009.

=== Glee version ===
"Listen" was covered by Jake Zyrus for the American TV show Glee episode "Audition", which aired on September 21, 2010. This version was released as a single, debuted at number 38 on the Billboard Hot 100, higher than Beyoncé's version. It also charted at number 51 on the Canadian Hot 100 chart the same week. Zyrus' version also peaked at number 87 on the Australian Singles Chart, at number 33 in Ireland, and at number 51 in the United Kingdom.

=== Melanie Amaro version ===
On September 22, 2011, an 18-year-old Melanie Amaro performed "Listen" on the second day of the opening week of first season of The X Factor in the US. As commented by both Becky Bain of Idolator and Jennifer Still of the British entertainment and media news website Digital Spy, the "powerful [and] emotional" performance "deservedly brought the judges to their feet". Amaro received a standing ovation from the audience and panel of judges alike. The performance of Amaro also brought Nicole Scherzinger to tears. She said: "This is why I do this. People like you inspire me. You made a believer out of me. Thank you." Paula Abdul said: "You are the brightest gift, God bless you." L.A. Reid declared: "Melanie, you are truly amazing. You have the gift, you have the soul, you have the spirit, you have the swagger ... you have the X Factor" while Simon Cowell said: "When I was asked by a lot of people why I was bringing this show to America, it was because I hoped that we were going to find someone like you."

She also sang "Listen" during the finals on December 21, 2011. A writer of Fox News Channel commented that the judges "didn't want to stop listening to Melanie Amaro" while she was singing a "soaring rendition" of the ballad. Simon Cowell said, "I brought this show to America because I believe some of the greatest singers in the world are from this country, and you just proved that. I think you, based on that performance tonight, to me, should be the winner of 'The X Factor,' because you're going to represent this country all over the world." L.A. Reid also commented, "That wasn't a $5 million performance. That was a $50 million performance." Sarah Maloy of Billboard magazine felt that her performance was "as powerfully and passionately [sang] as she did the first time". Lisa de Moraes of The Washington Post praised Amaro's rendition, writing that it contained a "determined look on her face, lots of generous spreading of the arms, and plenty of big notes". Amaro eventually emerged as the winner of The X Factor, performing this song for the final time.

=== Teodora Sava version ===
"Listen" was performed live by Teodora Sava (11 years old at that time) in the finale of the first edition of the Romanian kids talent show Next Star 2013. Her performance gathered praise and positive reactions from all of the judges and online, and had 3.5 million combined views on YouTube, making her well known to a wider audience in Romania and abroad. Soon after, one of the judges even invited her to sing at his own wedding. She proceeded with recording the song in studio. She performed the song again, this time being a shortened and slightly modified version, in the second live show of X Factor Romania 2017 (when she was 16 years old).

=== Other versions ===
Caressa Cameron, an American model performed the song live during the 2010 Miss America pageant, where she appeared wearing a yellow dress and later during the night won the Miss America title. On September 6, 2011, 31-year-old Marina Davis performed "Listen" during one of the audition episodes of the third season of The X Factor (Australia). Davis received praise from the judging panel. Ronan Keating said it was an impressive performance and she's got one of the best voices in the competition, while Mel B confirmed that Davis has definitely got the "X-Factor". On March 30, 2012, Katelin Koprivec sang "Listen" on the Australian talent show, Young Talent Time. Sarah De Bono also sang "Listen" on The Voice (Australia) on May 21, 2012. Michelle Griffin of The Age wrote that Bono had "the lungs to carry it off" but "not quite [like] Beyoncé's commanding delivery". Her version of the song peaked at number 13 on the Australian Singles Chart. On November 3, 2012, Jahméne Douglas performed the song on the ninth series of The X Factor in the UK, receiving praise from the judges of the show. Alex Fletcher of Digital Spy also noted that the cover was a "belter" and the singer "bloody well nailed it". On May 10, a 12-year-old girl Michèle won the contest of The Voice Kid in Germany after performing the song on the final show. Sam Bailey sang "Listen" on August 31, 2013 during the tenth season of The X Factor in the UK. It was described as the highlight of the episode and Bailey received standing ovation from the judges. American Idol runner-up Jessica Sanchez sang "Listen" on March 16, 2014 during Solaire Resort & Casino's first anniversary concert. Krisia Todorova covered it in the first song of her audition. Mia Negovetić (Croatia) covered it in the first song on "Zvjezdice" vocal contest and in the Little Big Shots airing on NBC TV in March, 2016. In April 2016, Shalyah Fearing, a contestant of The Voice sang "Listen" in her First Live Play-offs.

== Formats and track listings ==
- US CD single
1. "Listen" (Album version)
2. "Listen" (Instrumental)
- International CD Single
1. "Listen" (From Dreamgirls) – 3:40
2. "Irreplaceable" (DJ Speedy Remix) – 4:21
- Europe CD single
1. "Listen" (From Dreamgirls) – 3:40
2. "Irreplaceable" (Maurice Joshua Remix Edit) – 4:04
- Ireland, Italy and Netherlands Remix Single
1. "Listen" (Fraser T Smith Remix) – 3:39

== Charts ==
=== Weekly charts ===
Weekly chart performance for "Listen"
Chart (2007–2013)	Peak position
Austria (Ö3 Austria Top 40)	32
Belgium (Ultratip Bubbling Under Flanders)	6
Belgium (Ultratip Bubbling Under Wallonia)	9
CIS Airplay (TopHit) Fraser T Smith remix	53
European Hot 100 Singles (Billboard)	24
Germany (GfK)	18
Ireland (IRMA)	6
Italy (FIMI)	3
Netherlands (Dutch Top 40 Tipparade)	2
Netherlands (Single Top 100)	18
South Korea International (Gaon)	61
Switzerland (Schweizer Hitparade)	10
UK Singles (Official Charts)	8
UK R&B (OCC)	5
US Billboard Hot 100	61
US Hot R&B/Hip-Hop Songs (Billboard)	23

=== Year-end charts ===
2007 year-end performance
Chart (2007)	Position
Switzerland (Schweizer Hitparade)	67

2010 year-end performance
Chart (2010)	Position
South Korea International (Gaon)	34

2011 year-end performance
Chart (2011)	Position
South Korea International (Gaon)	102

2012 year-end performance
Chart (2012)	Position
South Korea International (Gaon)	114
South Korea International (Gaon)	170

== Certifications ==
Certifications and sales for "Listen"
Region	Certification	Certified units/sales
Australia (ARIA)	Platinum	70,000^{‡}
Brazil (Pro-Música Brasil)	Gold	30,000^{‡}
Canada (Music Canada)	Gold	40,000^{‡}
Japan (RIAJ) Full-length ringtone	Gold	100,000^{*}
New Zealand (RMNZ)	Gold	7,500^{*}
South Korea	—	830,120
United Kingdom (BPI)	Platinum	600,000^{‡}
United States (RIAA)	Platinum	1,000,000^{‡}
^{*} Sales figures based on certification alone.^{‡} Sales+streaming figures based on certification alone.

== Release history ==
Release dates and formats for "Listen"
Region	Date	Format(s)	Label(s)	Ref.
United Kingdom	January 19, 2007	Digital download	RCA	
Germany	February 9, 2007	CD	Sony BMG	
United States	February 13, 2007	CD	Columbia; Music World	
Japan	March 7, 2007	CD+DVD (Note: In Japan, "Listen" was released as a double A-side audiovisual single with "Irreplaceable".)	Sony BMG	
