= One Night Only (song) =

1981 song from the musical Dreamgirls

Single by Jennifer Holliday, Sheryl Lee Ralph and Loretta Devine

from the album Dreamgirls: Original Broadway Cast Album
- A-side: "When I First Saw You" (by Sheryl Lee Ralph and Ben Harney)
- Released: 1982
- Recorded: 1982
- Genre: Show tune; post-disco; soul
- Length: 3:42
- Label: Geffen
- Songwriter(s): Tom Eyen; Henry Krieger
- Producer(s): David Foster

"One Night Only" is a song from the 1981 Broadway musical Dreamgirls, with lyrics written by Tom Eyen and music by Henry Krieger. In the context of the musical, "One Night Only" is performed twice in succession, as differing versions of the song — a soul ballad by the character Effie White and a dance version by her former bandmates Deena Jones & the Dreams — compete on the radio and the pop charts.

== Song information ==
"One Night Only" was one of the first songs to be written for the play, which was originally titled after the tune during its workshop phase around 1978. Both versions of "One Night Only" appear as one track on the original 1982 Dreamgirls Broadway cast album, performed by Jennifer Holliday as Effie and Sheryl Lee Ralph, Loretta Devine, and Deborah Burrell as Deena Jones & the Dreams. "One Night Only" was later covered on album by Elaine Paige and Sylvester. Actor Hugh Jackman performed the song while hosting the 2004 Tony Awards ceremony, in a large production number featuring girl groups from the musicals Caroline, or Change, Hairspray, and Little Shop of Horrors.

== Film versions ==
"One Night Only"

Single by Deena Jones & the Dreams or Jennifer Hudson

from the album Dreamgirls: Music from the Motion Picture
- Released: August 15, 2006
- Recorded: December 2005
- Studio: The Underlab, Los Angeles
- Genre: Soul
- Length: 3:23
- Label: Music World; Columbia
- Songwriter(s): Henry Krieger; Tom Eyen
- Producer(s): The Underdogs; Ritchie Jones

In 2006, Dreamgirls was adapted by writer and director Bill Condon into a motion picture for DreamWorks SKG and Paramount. For this version, the two versions of "One Night Only" were performed by Jennifer Hudson as Effie and Beyoncé Knowles, Anika Noni Rose, and Sharon Leal as Deena Jones and the Dreams. R&B production team The Underdogs served as the producers of "One Night Only" and the other songs from the film's score. A club remix of the latter version, produced by Eric Kupper and Richie Jones, was issued by Music World Entertainment and Columbia Records as a single from the Dreamgirls film soundtrack on August 15, 2006, four months before the release of the film. American rapper Lil Wayne later sampled Hudson's version for his song of the same name.

=== Formats and track listings ===
Digital download

1. "One Night Only" (film version) – 3:23

House mixes EP

1. "One Night Only" (Eric Kupper & Richie Jones Club Mix edit) – 4:06
2. "One Night Only" (Eric Kupper & Richie Jones Club Mix) – 8:27
3. "One Night Only" (Eric Kupper & Richie Jones Club Mix instrumental) – 8:27
4. "One Night Only" (film version) – 3:23
5. "One Night Only" (film version instrumental) – 3:24

=== Charts ===
The version of "One Night Only" performed by Deena Jones & the Dreams entered the UK Singles Chart at number 67 on September 6, 2009 due to strong digital download sales. An audition performance by 21-year-old Rozell Phillips on the reality TV show The X Factor renewed interest in the song, three years after it was initially released.

Chart (2006) Deena Jones & The Dreams Version	Peak position
US Hot Dance Club Songs (Billboard)	13
Chart (2009) Deena Jones & The Dreams Version	Peak position
UK Singles Chart (Official Charts Company)	67
Chart (2025) Deena Jones & The Dreams Version	Peak position
UK Singles Downloads Chart (Official Charts Company)	83
UK Singles Sales Chart (Official Charts Company)	90
