= Glen Brunman =

American music executive

- Born: New York, New York
- Education: Queens College
- Occupations: Music industry executive and consultant Film and TV soundtrack executive and producer

Glen Brunman (New York) is an American music executive. Noted as an "architect of the soundtrack landscape," Brunman’s credits include more than 200 soundtrack releases which have cumulatively sold in excess of 150 million albums worldwide. In various capacities, he has been associated with releases which have won 21 Grammys and nine Academy Awards.

== Early life and education ==
Brunman was born and raised in Forest Hills, Queens. He was educated in the New York City public school system, and attended Queens College, where he became a leading student activist.

He served as student body president in 1968–69, and was a member of the National Supervisory Board of the United States National Student Association from 1967 to 1970. Following his graduation, Brunman served as a statewide student coordinator for New York Senator Charles Goodell's 1970 re-election campaign.

== Career ==
In early 1973, after a series of odd jobs, Brunman was hired as a political reporter and music critic for Good Times, an alternative newspaper based on Long Island. He was promoted to managing editor in the summer of 1973; in that position, he increased the paper’s focus on music. In February, 1975, Brunman was hired by Columbia Records as a publicist.

Working with Bruce Springsteen, Brunman designed a publicity campaign that concentrated on getting as many journalists as possible to see Springsteen in concert. The ‘Go-See-For-Yourself’ strategy proved effective as critics turned in “rave reviews,” which helped to build the momentum that resulted in Springsteen’s simultaneous appearance on the covers of Time and Newsweek in October 1975.

Brunman continued to serve as Springsteen’s publicist through the release of Darkness On The Edge Of Town. He also led the press campaigns for Billy Joel's breakthrough albums, The Stranger and 52nd Street. In December, 1978, Brunman moved to Los Angeles to become Director of West Coast Publicity for Epic Records. At Epic, in addition to representing other artists, Brunman served as Michael Jackson's primary label publicist, working with him on the Off The Wall, Thriller, and Bad albums.

Brunman was named Head of Publicity and Media Relations for the label in 1988, a job that also included artist development and marketing responsibilities. In addition to overseeing the media and artist development campaigns for Celine Dion, Brunman served as a marketing strategist for her first two English language albums. In 1990, Brunman played a pivotal role in Epic’s acquisition of the soundtrack rights for John Barry’s Academy Award-winning score for Dances With Wolves, and directed the marketing campaign for the album. Following that album’s success, Brunman was charged with creating Epic Soundtrax, the first major label imprint dedicated to soundtracks.

The label’s first hit was a 1992 country and rock Elvis Presley tribute album which served as the soundtrack for Honeymoon in Vegas. In 1993, Epic Soundtrax released the Judgment Night soundtrack, the first album where each track featured a collaboration between rock and hiphop artists. Between 1993 and 1994, the label released three soundtracks for films starring Tom Hanks: Sleepless In Seattle, Philadelphia and Forrest Gump. The Philadelphia soundtrack reunited Brunman with Springsteen, who composed "Streets of Philadelphia" for the film. The song went on to win an Academy Award and four Grammys. As of 2014, the three soundtracks combined had sold more than 20 million copies worldwide.

In 1996, Brunman was put in charge of soundtracks for all of the Sony Music labels as Executive Vice President of the newly created Sony Music Soundtrax. In 1997, in conjunction with Columbia Records, Brunman helped assemble the first 'inspired by' album, the multi-platinum Men in Black compilation. Additionally, in partnership with Sony Classical, Brunman acquired the soundtrack for Titanic. The album included the James Horner score for the film and the song "My Heart Will Go On," written by Horner and Will Jennings and performed by Celine Dion.

Horner won an Academy Award for Best Original Dramatic Score, and "My Heart Will Go On" won the Academy Award for Best Original Song in addition to four Grammy Awards. "My Heart Will Go On" was the fourth movie/music opportunity that Brunman generated for Dion. It followed the title track duet for 1991's Beauty and the Beast, the 1993 "When I Fall In Love" duet for Sleepless In Seattle, and 1995's "Because You Loved Me" for Up Close and Personal. "My Heart Will Go On" appeared on both the Titanic soundtrack and Dion's Let's Talk About Love album.

Both were released on November 18, 1997; to date, each album has sold more than 30 million copies worldwide. In 1998, under Brunman’s auspices, the Sony labels started to release soundtrack albums for television shows. Between 1998 and 2001, they released four Ally McBeal collections, two compilations each for Dawson’s Creek and The Sopranos, and single discs for South Park and Touched By An Angel. Combined, the albums sold more than 17 million copies worldwide.

Other notable releases included the movie musicals Chicago: Music from the Miramax Motion Picture (2002) and Dreamgirls: Music from the Motion Picture (2006),and the soundtracks for the independent films Garden State (2004) and Once (2007). In June, 2007, Brunman was named Executive Vice President, Head Of Creative, for Warner Chappell Music, the publishing arm of the Warner Music Group.

At Warner Chappell, Brunman was instrumental in signing Katy Perry and Lady Antebellum, prior to their commercial breakthroughs. He also signed the Academy Award-winning songwriting duo, Glen Hansard and Marketa Irglova as well as singer/songwriter Melody Gardot. In a 2007 interview regarding his position, Brunman said: “No matter what role I have been in, there are three things that have held true: Music has the power to change lives, great songs live forever, and rules are made to be broken.”

In 2009, Brunman established the consulting firm, Brahma Unlimited. His first client was Columbia Records, who hired him to acquire and develop soundtrack projects for the label. Soon after, Brunman brought Glee to the label.

The first Glee album was released in November 2009; since then, the Glee cast has charted more singles on the Billboard 100 than any artist in history, and have exceeded sales of 13 million albums and 63 million downloads worldwide as of February 2014. Brunman has been principally involved with the music from Glee since the series debuted.

=== Selected discography ===
Year	Album	Artist	Credit
1990	Dances with Wolves Original Motion Picture Soundtrack	John Barry	Soundtrack executive
1992	Honeymoon in Vegas Music from the Original Motion Picture Soundtrack	Various artists	Soundtrack executive producer
1993	Sleepless in Seattle Original Motion Picture Soundtrack	Various artists	Soundtrack executive
1993	Music from the Motion Picture Judgment Night	Various artists	Soundtrack executive producer
1994	Philadelphia Music from the Motion Picture	Various artists	Soundtrack executive producer
1994	Forrest Gump The Soundtrack	Various artists	Soundtrack executive producer
1995	Desperado: The Soundtrack	Various artists	Soundtrack executive
1996	Jerry Maguire	Various artists	Soundtrack executive
1996	That Thing You Do! Music from the Motion Picture	Various artists	Soundtrack executive
1997	Titanic: Music from the Motion Picture	James Horner, Celine Dion	Soundtrack executive
1997	My Best Friend's Wedding Music from the Motion Picture	Various artists	Soundtrack executive producer
1997	Men in Black: The Album	Various artists	Soundtrack executive
1998	Armageddon: The Album	Various artists	Soundtrack producer
1998 through 2001	Songs from Ally McBeal (television)	Vonda Shepard	Soundtrack executive (four album releases)
1999	Runaway Bride Original Motion Picture Soundtrack	Various artists	Soundtrack producer
1999 and 2001	Original Television Soundtrack The Sopranos	Various artists	Soundtrack executive (two album releases)
2000	Charlie's Angels Music from the Motion Picture	Various artists	Soundtrack executive
2000	Wonder Boys: Music from the Motion Picture	Various artists	Soundtrack executive
2001	A Knight's Tale Soundtrack	Various artists	Soundtrack executive producer
2002	Music from and Inspired by Spider-Man	Various artists	Soundtrack executive producer
2002	Chicago: Music from the Miramax Motion Picture	Various artists	Soundtrack executive
2004	Garden State Music from the Motion Picture	Various artists	Soundtrack executive
2004	De-Lovely Music from the Motion Picture	Various artists	Soundtrack executive producer
2006	Dreamgirls: Music from the Motion Picture	Various artists	Soundtrack executive producer
2007	Once Music From the Motion Picture	Glen Hansard, Marketa Irglova	Soundtrack executive
2009 through 2015	Glee The Music	Glee cast	Soundtrack executive (multiple album releases)
