= Henry Krieger =

American composer (born 1945)

Henry Krieger (born February 9, 1945) is an American musical theatre composer. He most notably wrote the music for the Broadway shows Dreamgirls (1981, with lyrics and book by Tom Eyen), The Tap Dance Kid (1983), and Side Show (1997).

He was nominated for the Tony Award for Best Original Score for both Dreamgirls and Side Show, won the Grammy Award for Best Cast Show Album for the cast album of Dreamgirls, and received three nominations for the Academy Award for Best Song for songs he wrote for the 2006 Dreamgirls film.

== Early life ==
Born in New York City, Krieger grew up in White Plains and Ossining in Westchester County, New York, and attended school at the Scarborough School in Scarborough, New York. There he played in Gilbert and Sullivan's Iolanthe and Ruddigore. He became interested in theatre and the dramatic arts, and he later studied creative and liberal arts at the American University in Washington, D.C., and Columbia University in New York, and then he studied Graphical Arts in Pontifical Xavierian University in Bogotá, Colombia.

== Career ==
While still in his twenties, Krieger began composing for Off-Off-Broadway. Eyen and Krieger first worked together on the 1975 musical version of Eyen's revue The Dirtiest Show in Town, called The Dirtiest Musical in Town. Nell Carter's performance in that musical inspired Krieger and Eyen to craft a musical about black backup singers, which they workshopped for Joe Papp but shelved when Carter dropped out in 1978 to appear in Ryan's Hope. A year later, the project caught the interest of Broadway director/producer/choreographer Michael Bennett, who sponsored a workshop production of Big Dreams, as the musical was then known, with Loretta Devine and twenty-year-old gospel singer Jennifer Holliday as Carter's replacement. After several workshops, numerous rewrites and various roadblocks, the show, now called Dreamgirls, came to Broadway in 1981. It was a success, and was nominated for thirteen Tony Awards (including Best Score), winning six. One of its songs, "And I Am Telling You I'm Not Going" became a top hit, and others became popular songs. The original cast album won Krieger a Grammy Award.

Two years later, in 1983, Krieger's musical The Tap Dance Kid, with lyrics by Robert Lorick, opened at Broadway's Broadhurst Theatre and went on to win two Tony Awards.

Nearly 15 years later, his next Broadway musical, Side Show, with book and lyrics by Bill Russell, opened at the Richard Rodgers Theatre in 1997. Side Show received four Tony nominations, including Best Score.

In 2000, Krieger's musical Everything's Ducky, again with Russell, opened at TheatreWorks in Palo Alto, California. The show won the 2000 Backstage West Garland Award for Best Score as well as the Will Glickman Award for Best New Bay Area Play of 2000. The musical has since had productions in St. Louis, Cincinnati, La Mirada, and Chicago. The musical was later revised and retitled to Lucky Duck, debuting at the Boston Conservatory.

Krieger collaborated with Russell again on Kept, based on Alexandre Dumas, fils' classic, Camille. Kept premiered at TheatreWorks in 2002. Krieger and Russell also wrote "Santa's Gonna Rock and Roll", which would serve as opening number of the Radio City Music Hall Christmas Spectacular for over a decade, and also "Take the Flame," for the opening and closing ceremonies of Gay Games IV.

In 2002, Krieger also wrote the score for The Wonderful World of Disney's television version of Sleeping Beauty, with lyrics by Susan Birkenhead.

When the film version of Dreamgirls was released in 2006, the soundtrack became a number one album, and Krieger's songs from the soundtrack became hits again. Krieger wrote four new songs for the film version, and he had the distinction of being nominated for the Academy Award for Best Original Song three times in one year, for three of the songs: "Listen", "Love You I Do", and "Patience".

With Birkenhead, he contributed two songs to Hats!, the 2007 musical revue of the Red Hat Society.

In 2008, he wrote the music for the musical Romantic Poetry, which features a book and lyrics by John Patrick Shanley. The musical premiered at Manhattan Theatre Club at New York City Center in October 2008 and featured a cast that includes Jeb Brown, Jerry Dixon, Ivan Hernandez, Mark Linn Baker, Patina Miller, and Emily Swallow. According to press notes, "Connie of Woodmere has just married Fred of Newark, but her exes are back in the picture and not sure they approve of the union. Mary of Greenpoint climbs Frankie of Little Italy's fire escape with amorous erotic intent – but things go awry as she reaches for her dream."

Krieger teamed up once again with Bill Russell to write the song "We Have to Change" for Spare Some Change: NYC Artists for Barack Obama on August 11, 2008, in New York City. The song was performed by Michael-Leon Wooley.

== Personal life ==
Krieger lives in New York City's Greenwich Village with the actor Robert Joy, his partner since 1995.

== Awards ==
=== Academy Awards ===
Year	Category	Nominated work	Result
2006	Best Original Song	"Listen"	Nominated
2006	Best Original Song	"Love You I Do"	Nominated
2006	Best Original Song	"Patience"	Nominated

=== Black Reel Awards ===
Year	Category	Nominated work	Result
2006	Best Original or Adapted Song	"And I Am Telling You I'm Not Going"	Won
2006	Best Original or Adapted Song	"Listen"	Nominated
2006	Best Original or Adapted Song	"One Night Only"	Nominated

=== British Academy Film Awards ===
Year	Category	Nominated work	Result
2006	Best Original Music	Dreamgirls	Nominated

=== Golden Globe Awards ===
Year	Category	Nominated work	Result
2006	Best Original Song	"Listen"	Nominated

=== Grammy Awards ===
Year	Category	Nominated work	Result
1983	Best Cast Show Album	Dreamgirls: Original Broadway Cast Album	Won
2008	Best Song Written for a Motion Picture, Television or Other Visual Media	"Love You I Do"	Won

=== Online Film and Television Association Awards ===
Year	Category	Nominated work	Result
2006	Best Adapted Song	"And I Am Telling You I'm Not Going"	Won
2006	Best Adapted Song	"I Am Changing"	Nominated
2006	Best Original Song	"Listen"	Won
2006	Best Original Song	"Love You I Do"	Nominated
2006	Best Original Song	"Patience"	Nominated

=== Satellite Awards ===
Year	Category	Nominated work	Result
2006	Best Original Song	"Listen"	Nominated
2006	Best Original Song	"Love You I Do"	Nominated

=== Tony Awards ===
Year	Category	Nominated work	Result
1982	Best Original Score	Dreamgirls	Nominated
1998	Best Original Score	Side Show	Nominated
