= I Am Changing =

1982 single by Jennifer Holliday

Single by Jennifer Holliday

from the album Dreamgirls: Original Broadway Cast Album
- Released: 1982
- Recorded: 1981
- Genre: Show tune; R&B; soul
- Length: 4:01
- Label: Geffen
- Songwriters: Tom Eyen; Henry Krieger
- Producer: David Foster

Jennifer Holliday singles chronology
"And I Am Telling You I'm Not Going" (1982)	"I Am Changing" (1982)	"I Am Love" (1983)

"I Am Changing" is a song from the second act of the long-running Broadway musical Dreamgirls. Written by Henry Krieger and Tom Eyen, the song was performed by the character Effie White, originally portrayed on Broadway by Jennifer Holliday.

== History ==
"I Am Changing" tells the story of a woman who wants to leave behind the mistakes of her past and "change her life"—she sings, "I need you, I need a hand" and "I need a friend to help me start all over again". After the unexpected success of Holliday's first single, "And I Am Telling You I'm Not Going", "I Am Changing" was released as the second single from the Dreamgirls cast album.

However, the song didn't perform as well as "And I Am Telling You I'm Not Going", peaking at #22 on Billboard's Black Singles Chart and failing to chart on Billboard's Pop Singles Chart.

== Cover versions ==
"I Am Changing" has been covered several times. Whitney Houston performed the song at the 10th Anniversary of Arista Records ceremony in 1984. This performance is included on her 2010 CD/DVD reissue of Whitney Houston – The Deluxe Anniversary Edition. She also performed the song during the duration of her Greatest Love World Tour in 1986 in a slower, soulful version, influenced by gospel music.

Ex-Supreme Mary Wilson included it in her album Walk the Line, and in a compilation of her solo singles.

Lillias White, who was Holliday's original understudy, has performed the song in concert. Jennifer Hudson performs the song as Effie White in the 2006 DreamWorks/Paramount Dreamgirls motion picture adaptation.

The song was performed by Bianca Ryan on the first season of NBC's America's Got Talent, a reality show which Ryan became the winner of that year. The eleven-year-old's performance of "I Am Changing" prompted show judge (and onetime teen star) Brandy to shake her head and proclaim that Ryan "makes me want to go practice … that's how good you are."

In 2014, the song was performed in the Glee episode "New Directions" by Kurt Hummel (Chris Colfer) and Mercedes Jones (Amber Riley).

== Charts ==
Chart (1982)	Peak position
US Hot R&B/Hip-Hop Songs (Billboard)	22
