= Keith Robinson (actor) =

American actor and singer

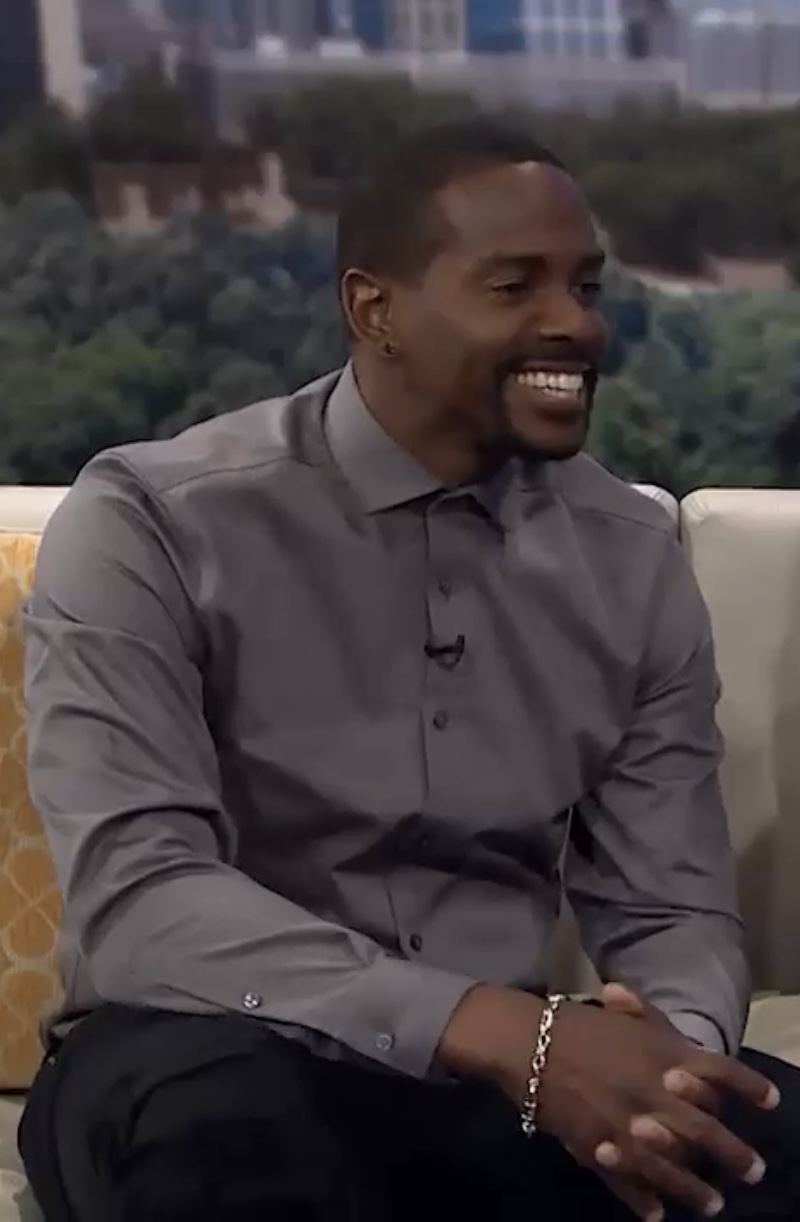
- Robinson in 2020
- Born: Louisville, Kentucky, U.S.
- Other name: Keith D. Robinson
- Occupations: Actor; singer
- Years active: 2000–present
- Musical career
- Genre: R&B
- Website: www.keithsings.com

Keith Robinson is an American actor and contemporary R&B singer.

== Early life ==
Robinson was born in Louisville, Kentucky, attended public schools in Greenville, South Carolina, and later moved to the Evans suburb of Augusta, Georgia where he graduated from Lakeside High School. While attending the University of Georgia, Robinson signed a recording contract with Motown Records, although the label never issued any of his material.

== Career ==
Moving to Los Angeles, California, and turning to acting, Robinson gained a starring role in the TV series Power Rangers Lightspeed Rescue as Joel Rawlings, the Green Lightspeed Ranger. After the end of the series, he appeared in such films as Fat Albert, and Mimic: Sentinel. Robinson also appeared in such television series as American Dreams, Monk, and Over There.

Robinson and Obba Babatundé (who portrayed C.C. White in the original Broadway production of Dreamgirls) both had recurring roles on the UPN series Half & Half. Robinson recently played the role of Chester Fields, on Fox's Canterbury's Law. Most recently, Robinson appeared in the supporting role of C.C. White in the film adaptation of the Broadway musical Dreamgirls. The film includes a Robinson-led version of the Dreamgirls song "Family". Robinson joined his fellow Dreamgirls cast members to perform "Patience", one of the new songs written for the film, at the 79th Academy Awards ceremony. He appeared in the film This Christmas. Robinson also performed in Comanche Moon: Road to Lonesome Dove.

In March 2025, it was announced Robinson had joined the cast of Beyond the Gates in the role of Ted Richardson. He made his first appearance on May 16.

== Filmography ==
=== Film ===
Year	Title	Role	Notes
2001	The Princess and the Marine	Trucker	TV movie
2003	Frozen Impact	Camera Man	TV movie
2003	Mimic 3: Sentinel	Desmond	Video
2004	30 Days Until I'm Famous	Shane	TV movie
2004	Fat Albert	Bill Cosby	
2005	The Reading Room	Darrel	TV movie
2006	Dreamgirls	C.C. White	
2007	This Christmas	Devean Brooks	
2010	Dear John	Captain Stone	
2010	When The Lights Go Out	Gary	Video
2010	Dogs of Chinatown	Russian Bartender	TV movie
2011	35 and Ticking	Phil	
2011	Hopelessly in June	Blair Callahan	
2012	Dysfunctional Friends	Dennis	
2012	If You Really Love Me	-	TV movie
2012	Redemption Of A Dog	Willard	
2012	Divorce Invitation	Scott	
2013	Caught on Tape	Sean	
2013	24 Hour Love	Manny	
2013	Forbidden Woman	Elston	
2014	Four Seasons	Xavier	
2014	Act of Faith	Patrick	
2014	Cru	Marshall 'M.O.' Ogden	
2014	Get On Up	Baby Roy	
2014	Lap Dance	Himself	
2014	Lyfe's Journey	David Lyfe	TV movie
2016	Mouthpiece	Himself	
2017	All Eyez on Me	Atron	
2017	Our Dream Christmas	Tim Purnell	TV movie
2018	The Products of the American Ghetto	Silk	
2018	Gangland: The Musical	Maurice	
2019	A Christmas Love Story	Brian	TV movie
2020	Open	Cameron	TV movie
2020	Somebody's in My House	-	
2021	Redemption in Cherry Springs	Jake Collins	TV movie
2021	Sister Swap: A Hometown Holiday	Joe	TV movie
2021	Sister Swap: Christmas in the City	Joe	TV movie
2022	Fallen Angels Murder Club: Friends to Die For	Bill Lynley	TV movie
2022	Remember Me: The Mahalia Jackson Story	Thomas Dorsey	

=== Television ===
Year	Title	Role	Notes
2000	Power Rangers Lightspeed Rescue	Joel Rawlings / Green Lightspeed Ranger	Main Cast
2001	ER	William White	Recurring Cast: Season 7
2001	Power Rangers Time Force	Joel Rawlings / Green Lightspeed Ranger	Episode: "Time for Lightspeed"
2002–2006	Half & Half	Neil Crawford	Recurring Cast: Season 1, Guest: Season 2–4
2003–2005	American Dreams	Nathan Walken	Recurring Cast
2004	NYPD Blue	Darnell 'DJ Drayno' Ellison	Episode: "Passing the Stone"
2005	All Saints	Noel Bassette	Episode: "Boys Will Be Boys"
2005	Over There	PV2 Avery "Angel" King	Main Cast
2005	Monk	Sgt. #2	Episode: "Mr. Monk Gets Stuck in Traffic"
2008	Comanche Moon	Joshua Deets	Episode: "Part 1-3"
2008	Canterbury's Law	Chester Fields	Main Cast
2009	Monk	Officer Darden	Episode: "Mr. Monk and the Critic"
2010	Dark Blue	Michael Dupree	Episode: "Liar's Poker"
2010	Castle	Random Pierce	Episode: "Under the Gun"
2010	Lie to Me	Rudy	Episode: "Smoked"
2011	Tyler Perry's House of Payne	Child Visitation Monitor	Episode: The Rich and Payneless
2011–2012	Love That Girl!	Maverick	Recurring Cast: Season 3
2012	The Glades	Darryl McMillan	Episode: "Poseidon Adventure"
2013	White Collar	Angelo Wells	Episode: "Empire City"
2013	Second Generation Wayans	Brock Matthews	Episode: "Cut!"
2014	One Love	Devin Carter	Recurring Cast
2014	NCIS	Henry Caldwell	Episode: "The Searchers"
2016	Major Crimes	Miguel	Episode: "Foreign Affairs"
2016–2022	Saints & Sinners	Miles Calloway	Main Cast
2021	Bump	Angus	Episode: "Driftwood"
2021	The Grid	KR	Episode: "Episode #1.6"
2022	Bust Down	Boone Jackson	Episode: "Pitching Tent"
2022	A Million Little Things	Dre Washington	Recurring cast: Season 4
2023	Crimson Hearts Collide	Zeke	Main cast
2025–present	Beyond the Gates	Ted Richardson	Main cast
2026	The Ms. Pat Show	James Freeman	Episode: "Chilli Chilli, Bang Bang!"

== Music videos ==
- "Love Somebody"(2016)
- Got Your Back (2010)
