= The Underdogs (music producers) =

American R&B/pop production duo

- Genres: R&B, pop, hip hop
- Occupations: Record producers, songwriters
- Years active: 2000–2008, 2011–2016
- Label: J
- Past members: Harvey Mason Jr. Damon Thomas

The Underdogs was an American R&B/pop production duo composed of Harvey Mason Jr. and Damon Thomas.

== Biography ==
Harvey Mason Jr. is the son of session drummer Harvey Mason Sr. Damon Thomas was a songwriting and production partner for R&B producer Kenneth "Babyface" Edmonds during the late 1990s, and worked with Babyface on hits such as Dru Hill's "These Are the Times", Faith Evans' "Never Gonna Let You Go", and Pink's "Most Girls". Harvey Mason Jr. was part of the Darkchild crew working alongside Rodney Jerkins before teaming up with Thomas.

Mason and Thomas began working together in 1999, with their first major production being Tyrese's single "I Like Them Girls". Since then, the duo has worked with a number of R&B performers, among them Lionel Richie, Omarion, J. Valentine, Justin Timberlake, Victoria Beckham, Joe, Donell Jones, Olivia, Mario, JoJo, Mario Vazquez, Stacie Orrico, R. Kelly, Jessica Mauboy, Chris Brown, Jordin Sparks, Marques Houston, Ruben Studdard, Fantasia, Katharine McPhee and more.

Among their work has been the soundtrack for the long-planned film adaptation of the Broadway musical Dreamgirls, featuring performances by Jennifer Hudson, Beyoncé Knowles, Anika Noni Rose, Eddie Murphy, Keith Robinson, and Jamie Foxx.

The Underdogs also produced the Aretha Franklin/Mary J. Blige collaboration "Never Gonna Break My Faith" for the Bobby soundtrack.

"No Air", a collaboration by Jordin Sparks & Chris Brown earned the duo a grammy nomination and is known for being one of the greatest duets of all time.

Thomas was married to celebrity reality star Kim Kardashian from 2000 to 2004.

In 2011, The Underdogs reunited to produce "Up 2 You" for Chris Brown's album F.A.M.E. and the song "Living Proof" with Mary J. Blige for motion picture The Help. In 2012, The Underdogs wrote and produced the first single from Chris Brown's album Fortune, titled "Turn Up the Music". Also in 2012, The Underdogs produced the soundtrack album for the films Pitch Perfect and Pitch Perfect 2. In 2014, they produced and arranged music for Get On Up depicting the life of James Brown. In 2015, The Underdogs produced and arranged music for the motion picture biopic Straight Outta Compton.
