= Tyrese discography =

R&B recording artist discography

Tyrese Gibson discography
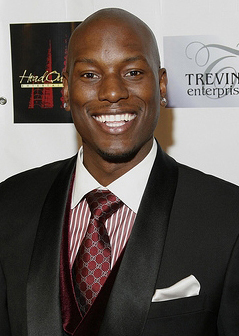
- Studio albums: 7
- Mixtapes: 3
- Compilation albums: 1
- Singles: 26
- Music videos: 10

American singer and actor Tyrese has released seven studio albums, three mixtapes and twelve singles. According to Billboard, Tyrese has sold 3.69 million albums in the United States.

== Albums ==
=== Studio albums ===
List of albums, with selected chart positions, sales figures and certifications
Title	Album details	Peak chart positions			Certifications
Title	Album details	US	US R&B	US Rap	Certifications
Tyrese	Released: September 29, 1998; Label: RCA; Format: CD, digital download	17	6	—	RIAA: Platinum
2000 Watts	Released: May 22, 2001; Label: RCA; Format: CD, digital download	10	4	—	RIAA: Gold
I Wanna Go There	Released: December 17, 2002; Label: J; Format: CD, digital download	16	2	—	RIAA: Gold
Alter Ego	Released: December 12, 2006; Label: J; Format: CD, digital download	23	4	2	
Open Invitation	Released: November 1, 2011; Label: Voltron, EMI; Format: CD, digital download, LP	9	2	—	
Black Rose	Released: July 10, 2015; Label: Voltron, Caroline; Format: CD, digital download, LP	1	1	—	
Beautiful Pain	Released: August 30, 2024; Label: Voltron, Create Music Group; Format: LP, CD, digital download, streaming	—	—	—	
"—" denotes items that did not chart or were not released.

=== Reissued albums ===
List of albums, with selected chart positions
Title	Album details	Peak chart positions
Title	Album details	US R&B
Painfully Beautiful	Released: August 29, 2025; Label: Voltron, Create Music Group; Format: digital download, streaming	—
"—" denotes items that did not chart or were not released.

=== Compilations ===
List of albums, with selected chart positions
Title	Album details	Peak chart positions
Title	Album details	US R&B
Super Hits	Released: May 27, 2008; Label: Sbme Special Mkts.; Format: CD, digital download	27
Playlist: The Very Best of Tyrese	Released: January 25, 2011; Label: Sony Legacy; Format: CD, digital download	—
"—" denotes items that did not chart or were not released.

=== Mixtapes ===
List of mixtapes with selected details
Title	Album details
Best of Both Hoodz, Vol. 1	Released: 2006; Label: Self-released; Format: Digital download
Ghetto Royalty	Released: 2006; Label: Self-released; Format: Digital download
Invisible Bully: The Lost Tapes	Released: 2012; Label: Self-released; Format: Digital download

== Singles ==
=== As lead artist ===
List of singles, with selected chart positions, showing year released and album name
Title	Year	Peak chart positions					Certifications	Album
Title	Year	US	US R&B	AUS	NZ	UK	Certifications	Album
"Nobody Else"	1998	36	12	—	—	59		Tyrese
"Sweet Lady"	1999	12	9	—	47	55		Tyrese
"Lately"	1999	56	12	—	—	—		Tyrese
"The Best Man I Can Be" (with Ginuwine, R.L. and Case)	1999	77	20	—	—	—		The Best Man soundtrack
"Criminal Mind" (featuring Heavy D)	1999	—	—	—	—	—		Blue Streak soundtrack
"I Like Them Girls"	2001	48	15	50	—	—		2000 Watts
"What Am I Gonna Do"	2001	71	24	—	—	—		2000 Watts
"Just a Baby Boy" (featuring Snoop Dogg and Mr. Tan)	2001	90	40	—	—	—		2000 Watts
"How You Gonna Act Like That"	2002	7	3	—	40	30	RMNZ: Gold	I Wanna Go There
"Signs of Love Makin'"	2003	57	18	—	—	—		I Wanna Go There
"Pick Up The Phone" (with Ludacris and R. Kelly)	2003	—	65	—	—	—		2 Fast 2 Furious soundtrack
"One"	2006	— (Note: "One" did not enter the Billboard Hot 100, but peaked at number 22 on the Bubbling Under Hot 100 chart.)	26	—	—	—		Alter Ego
"Turn Ya Out" (featuring Lil Jon)	2007	—	70	—	—	—		Alter Ego
"Take Me Away"	2009	—	—	—	—	—		Non-album single
"Too Easy" (featuring Ludacris)	2011	—	38	—	—	—		Open Invitation
"Stay"	2011	— (Note: "One" did not enter the Billboard Hot 100, but peaked at number five on the Bubbling Under Hot 100 chart.)	11	—	—	—		Open Invitation
"Nothing on You"	2012	—	61	—	—	—		Open Invitation
"Sex Never Felt Better" (with Ginuwine and Tank as TGT)	2013	—	38	—	—	—		Three Kings
"I Need" (with Ginuwine and Tank as TGT)	2013	—	29	—	—	—		Three Kings
"Next Time Around"	2014	—	—	—	—	—		Three Kings
"Dumb Shit" (featuring Snoop Dogg)	2014	—	—	—	—	—		Black Rose
"Shame" (featuring Jennifer Hudson)	2015	— (Note: "Shame" did not enter the Billboard Hot 100, but peaked at number three on the Bubbling Under Hot 100 chart.)	32	—	—	—		Black Rose
"Waiting on You"	2016	—	—	—	—	—		Black Rose
"Prior to You"	2016	—	—	—	—	—		Black Rose
"Legendary" (featuring Cee-Lo Green)	2020	—	—	—	—	—		Non-album singles
"Don't Think You Ever Loved Me" (featuring Lenny Kravitz and Le'Andria Johnson)	2023	—	—	—	—	—		Beautiful Pain
"Wildflower"	2024	—	—	—	—	—		Beautiful Pain
"—" denotes releases that did not chart or was not released in that country.

=== As featured artist ===
List of featured singles, with selected chart positions, showing year released and album name
Title	Year	Peak chart positions					Certifications	Album
Title	Year	US	US R&B	AUS	NZ	UK	Certifications	Album
"What'chu Like" (Da Brat featuring Tyrese)	2000	26	9	—	—	—		Unrestricted
"Pullin' Me Back" (Chingy featuring Tyrese)	2006	9	1	35	12	44	RMNZ: Platinum	Hoodstar
"Nobody Do It Better" (Keith Murray featuring Junior and Tyrese)	2006	—	—	—	—	—		Rap-Murr-Phobia (The Fear of Real Hip-Hop)
"—" denotes releases that did not chart or was not released in that country.

== Music videos ==
List of music videos, showing year released and director
Title	Year	Director(s)
"What'chu Like" (with Da Brat)	2001	Michael Salomon
"I Like Them Girls"	2001	Larry Jordan
"Just a Baby Boy" (with Snoop Dogg and Mr. Tan)	2001	Brent Hedgecock
"I Gotta Chick" (with Tyga)	2011	Brazil
"Stay"	2011	Matt Alonzo
"Too Easy" (with Ludacris)	2011	Matt Alonzo
"Legendary" (featuring Cee-Lo Green)	2020	Deon Taylor
"Love Transaction"	2024	Tyrese
"Wildflower"	2024	Santiago Salviche
