= 1999 Soul Train Music Awards =

Music awards ceremony in Los Angeles, US

Soul Train Music Awards
- Date: March 26, 1999
- Location: Shrine Auditorium, Los Angeles, California
- Country: United States
- Hosted by: Tyra Banks, Monica and Brian McKnight
- First award: 1987

Highlights
- Most awards: Lauryn Hill (4)
- Website: soultrain.com

Television/radio coverage
- Network: WGN America

The 1999 Soul Train Music Awards was held at the Shrine Auditorium in Los Angeles, California and aired live in select cities on March 26, 1999 (and was later syndicated in other areas), honoring the best in R&B, soul, rap, jazz, and gospel music from the previous year. The show was hosted by Tyra Banks, Brian McKnight and Monica.

== Special awards ==
=== Quincy Jones Award for Outstanding Career Achievements ===
- Luther Vandross

=== Sammy Davis Jr. Award for Entertainer of the Year – Male ===
- R. Kelly

=== Sammy Davis Jr. Award for Entertainer of the Year – Female ===
- Lauryn Hill

== Winners and nominees ==
Winners are in bold text.

=== R&B/Soul or Rap Album of the Year ===
- **Lauryn Hill – The Miseducation of Lauryn Hill**
  - Erykah Badu – Erykah Badu Live
  - DMX – It's Dark and Hell Is Hot
  - Jay Z – Vol. 2... Hard Knock Life

=== Best R&B/Soul Album – Male ===
- **R. Kelly – R.**
  - Tyrese – Tyrese
  - Maxwell – Embrya
  - Will Smith – Big Willie Style

=== Best R&B/Soul Album – Female ===
- **Lauryn Hill – The Miseducation of Lauryn Hill**
  - Brandy – Never Say Never
  - Mýa – Mýa
  - Kelly Price – Soul of a Woman

=== Best R&B/Soul Album – Group, Band or Duo ===
- **The Temptations – Phoenix Rising**
  - Dru Hill – Enter the Dru
  - LSG – Levert.Sweat.Gill
  - Outkast – Aquemini

=== Best R&B/Soul Single – Male ===
- **Brian McKnight – "Anytime"**
  - Jon B. – "They Don't Know"
  - Tyrese - "Nobody Else"
  - R. Kelly – "Half on a Baby"

=== Best R&B/Soul Single – Female ===
- **Deborah Cox – "Nobody's Supposed to Be Here"**
  - Lauryn Hill – "Doo Wop (That Thing)"
  - Janet Jackson (featuring Blackstreet) – "I Get Lonely"
  - Kelly Price (featuring Ron Isley & R.Kelly) – "Friend of Mine"

=== Best R&B/Soul Single – Group, Band or Duo ===
- **Next – "Too Close"**
  - Brandy and Monica – "The Boy is Mine"
  - K-Ci & JoJo – "All My Life"
  - The Temptations – "Stay"

=== The Michael Jackson Award for Best R&B/Soul or Rap Music Video ===
- **DMX (featuring Ja Rule, Nas, & Method Man) – "Grand Finale"**
  - Busta Rhymes – "Dangerous"
  - Big Punisher (featuring Joe) – "Still Not a Player"
  - Will Smith – "Gettin' Jiggy With It"

=== Best R&B/Soul or Rap New Artist ===
- **Kelly Price**
  - Lord Tariq and Peter Gunz
  - Mýa
  - Trin-i-tee 5:7

=== Best Jazz Album ===
- **Herbie Hancock – Gershwin's World**
  - Olu Dara – In the World: From Natchez to New York
  - Russ Freeman and Craig Chaquico – From the Redwoods to the Rockies
  - John Scofield – A Go Go

=== Best Gospel Album ===
- **Kirk Franklin – The Nu Nation Project**
  - Ronnie Bryant and the Christian Community Choir – He's a Keepa
  - Fred Hammond – Pages of Life - Chapters I & II
  - Walter Hawkins and the Love Center Choir – Love Alive V: 25th Anniversary Reunion

== Performers ==
- Whitney Houston – "It's Not Right but It's Okay"
- Kelly Price and Da Brat – "Secret Love"
- Deborah Cox and R. L. Huggar – "We Can't Be Friends"
- Luther Vandross Tribute:
  - El DeBarge, Johnny Gill and Kenny Lattimore – "Never Too Much" / "Don't Want to Be a Fool" / "Wait for Love"
  - Whitney Houston – "So Amazing"
- Kirk Franklin and Nu Nation – "Love"
- R. Kelly – "When a Woman's Fed Up"
- Monica – "Angel of Mine"
- Lauryn Hill – "Everything is Everything"

== Presenters ==
- Ginuwine, Traci Bingham and Next - Presented Best R&B/Soul Single - Male
- Nas, Monifah and Lisa Nicole Carson - Presented Best R&B/Soul or Rap New Artist
- Tia and Tamara Mowry, TQ and Tom Joyner - Presented Best R&B/Soul Single - Female
- Jon B., Cherokee and Herbie Hancock - Presented Best Gospel Album
- Destiny's Child, Erykah Badu and DJ Quik - Presented The Michael Jackson Award for Best R&B/Soul or Rap Music Video
- Valerie Hill - Presented Sammy Davis Jr. Award for Entertainer of the Year – Female
- Sparkle, Lord Tariq and Peter Gunz and Mystro Clark - Presented Best R&B/Soul Album - Male
- Timbaland, Eric Benet and Trin-i-tee 5:7 - Presented R&B/Soul or Rap Album of the Year
- Whitney Houston - Presented Quincy Jones Award for Career Achievement
- Tyrese, Naughty By Nature and Tracie Spencer - Presented Best R&B/Soul Album - Group, Band or Duo
- Mya, Outkast and Eddie Griffin - Presented Best R&B/Soul Single - Group, Band or Duo
- Don Cornelius - Presented Sammy Davis Jr. Award for Entertainer of the Year – Male
- Keith Sweat and Shanice - Presented Best R&B/Soul Album - Female
