= 3rd Annual Black Reel Awards =

Film-industry awards in 2002

3rd Black Reel Awards
- Date: April 21, 2002
- Location: Washington, D.C.

The 2002 Black Reel Awards, which annually recognize and celebrate the achievements of black people in feature, independent and television films, took place in Washington, D.C., on April 21, 2002. Training Day was the big winner of the evening, taking home four awards, followed by Ali with three awards.

== Winners and nominees ==
Winners are listed first and highlighted in bold.

Best Film	Best Director
**Training Day**; Ali; Baby Boy; From Hell; The Brothers	**Antoine Fuqua – Training Day**; Thomas Carter – Save the Last Dance; Gary Hardwick – The Brothers; Albert Hughes and Allen Hughes – From Hell; John Singleton – Baby Boy
Best Actor	Best Actress
**Denzel Washington – Training Day**; Vin Diesel – The Fast and the Furious; Tyrese Gibson – Baby Boy; Samuel L. Jackson – The Caveman's Valentine; Will Smith – Ali	**Halle Berry – Monster's Ball**; Vivica A. Fox – Two Can Play That Game; Pam Grier – Bones; Taraji P. Henson – Baby Boy; Regina King – Down to Earth
Best Supporting Actor	Best Supporting Actress
**Jamie Foxx – Ali**; Anthony Anderson – Two Can Play That Game; Omar Epps – Brother; Eddie Murphy – Shrek; Ving Rhames – Baby Boy	**Nona Gaye – Ali**; Marla Gibbs – The Visit; Adrienne-Joi Johnson – Baby Boy; Gabrielle Union – The Brothers; Kerry Washington – Save the Last Dance
Best Screenplay, Adapted or Original	Best Film Poster
**Gregory Allen Howard – Ali**; Mark Brown – Two Can Play That Game; Peter Gaulke and Darryl Quarles – Black Knight; Gary Hardwick – The Brothers; John Singleton – Baby Boy	**Training Day**; Ali; Baby Boy; The Brothers; The Caveman's Valentine
Outstanding Original Soundtrack	Best Original or Adapted Song
**Ali**; Baby Boy; The Brothers; Hardball; Training Day	**"Love Don't Love Me" from The Brothers – Performed by Eric Benét**; "Good Love" from The Brothers – Performed by R.L.; "Just a Baby Boy" from Baby Boy – Performed by Snoop Dogg, Tyrese and Mr. Tan; "The World's Greatest" from Ali – Performed by R. Kelly; "#1" from Training Day – Performed by Nelly
Best Independent Film	Outstanding Independent Film Actor / Actress
**The Visit – Jordan Walker-Pearlman**; 30 Years to Life – Vanessa Middleton; Blue Hill Avenue – Craig Ross Jr.; Lift – DeMane Davis and Khari Streeter; Lumumba – Raoul Peck; One Week – Carl Seaton	**Rockmond Dunbar – Punks**; **Allen Payne – Blue Hill Avenue**; Eriq Ebouaney – Lumumba; Kenny Young – One Week; Kerry Washington – Lift
Best Original Television Program	Best Television Miniseries or Movie
**Beyond Tara: The Extraordinary Life of Hattie McDaniel**; Marcus Garvey: Look for Me in the Whirlwind; 32nd NAACP Image Awards; VH1 Divas Live: The One and Only Aretha Franklin	**Boycott (HBO) – Clark Johnson**; 3 A.M. (Showtime) – Lee Davis; A Huey P. Newton Story (Starz) – Spike Lee; Dancing in September (HBO) – Reggie Rock Bythewood; Stranger Inside (HBO) – Cheryl Dunye
Best Actor in a TV Movie or Limited Series	Best Actress in a TV Movie or Limited Series
**Roger Guenveur Smith – A Huey P. Newton Story (Starz)**; Morris Chestnut – The Killing Yard (Showtime); Danny Glover – 3 A.M. (Showtime); Gregory Hines – Bojangles (Showtime); Jeffrey Wright – Boycott (HBO)	**Angela Bassett – Ruby's Bucket of Blood (Showtime)**; Pam Grier – 3 A.M. (Showtime); Nicole Ari Parker – Dancing in September (HBO); Phylicia Rashad – The Old Settler (PBS); Yolonda Ross – Stranger Inside (HBO)
Best Supporting Actor in a TV Movie or Limited Series	Best Supporting Actress in a TV Movie or Limited Series
**Terrence Howard – Boycott (HBO)**; Reg E. Cathey – Boycott (HBO); Erik Dellums – Boycott (HBO); Mekhi Phifer – Carmen: A Hip Hopera (MTV); Vicellous Reon Shannon – Dancing in September (HBO)	**Kimberly Elise – Bojangles (Showtime)**; Davenia McFadden – Stranger Inside (HBO); C. C. H. Pounder – Boycott (HBO); Michelle Rodriguez – 3 A.M. (Showtime); Jurnee Smollett-Bell – Ruby's Bucket of Blood (Showtime)
Outstanding Screenplay in a TV Movie or Limited Series
**Reggie Rock Bythewood – Dancing in September (HBO)**; Catherine Crouch and Cheryl Dunye – Stranger Inside (HBO); Lee Davis – 3 A.M. (Showtime); Shauneille Perry – The Old Settler (PBS); Roger Guenveur Smith – A Huey P. Newton Story (Starz)
