= Shame (Tyrese song) =

Single by Tyrese

from the album Black Rose
- Released: April 28, 2015
- Recorded: 2014
- Genre: Soul
- Length: 5:11
- Label: Voltron; Caroline
- Songwriters: Warryn Campbell; Tyrese D. Gibson; D.J. Rogers, Jr.; Sam Dees; Ron Kersey
- Producers: Warryn Campbell; Tyrese

Tyrese singles chronology
"Dumb Shit" (2015)	"Shame" (2015)	"Waiting On You" (2016)

"Shame" is a song by American singer Tyrese. It features background vocals from fellow American singer Jennifer Hudson. It was released on April 28, 2015 as the second single off his sixth studio album Black Rose, on the record label Voltron Recordz. The song contains an interpolation of Atlantic Starr's 1980 hit "Send for Me". "Shame" was nominated for Best Traditional R&B Performance and Best R&B Song at the 58th Grammy Awards.

== Music video ==
The music video was produced by Denzel Washington and directed by Paul Hunter. This is Tyrese's second time working with the director, as Hunter previously directed the music video for "Signs of Love Makin'" from his 2002 album I Wanna Go There.

== Personnel ==
Credits adapted from Black Rose liner notes.

- Tyrese – lead vocals, producer
- Jennifer Hudson – background vocals
- Mika Lett – background vocals
- Warryn Campbell – producer, instrumentation
- Wah Wah Watson – guitar
- Richard Furch – mixing, recording

== Chart performance ==
Chart performance for "Shame"
Chart (2015)	Peak position
US Bubbling Under Hot 100 (Billboard)	3
US Adult R&B Songs (Billboard)	1
US Hot R&B/Hip-Hop Songs (Billboard)	32
US R&B/Hip-Hop Airplay (Billboard)	13
