= Kym Whitley =

American comedian and actress

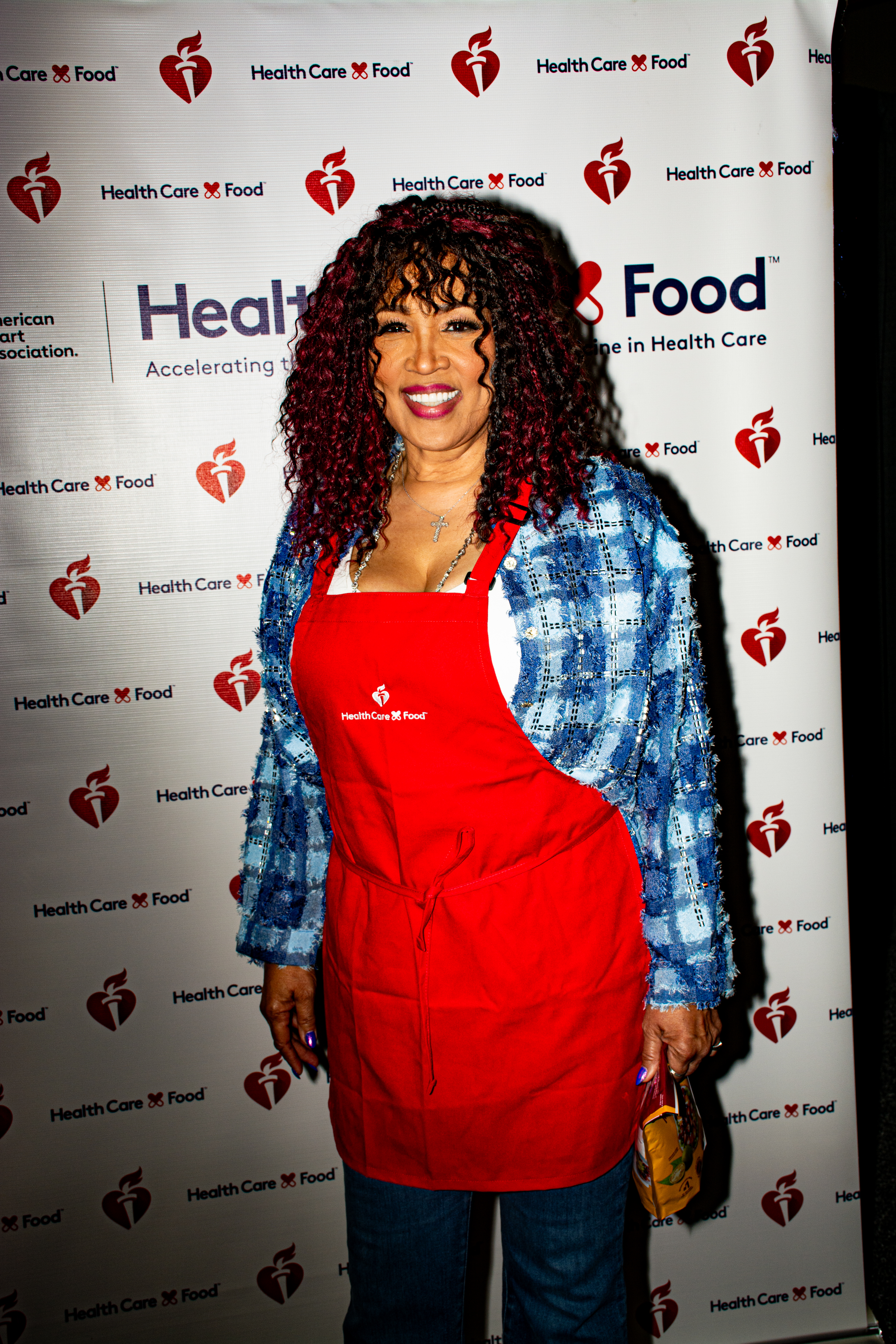
- Whitley at Congressional Black Caucus ALC54
- Education: Fisk University
- Occupations: Comedian, actress, podcaster
- Years active: 1989–present
- Television: Raising Whitley
- Children: 1
- Relatives: Michael Jai White (cousin)
- Website: www.kymwhitley.org

Kym Whitley is an American comedian, actress and podcaster. She is known for her roles on television sitcoms, such as My Brother and Me, Sparks, Animal Practice, The Boondocks, Young & Hungry, The Parkers, The Cleveland Show, Black Dynamite, and Act Your Age. Whitley was nominated for a 2004 BET Comedy Award for Outstanding Supporting Actress in a Box Office Movie for her role as Ormandy in the 2003 comedy film Deliver Us From Eva.

== Early life and education ==
Whitley, who is of African American heritage, is the daughter of William Whitley. Her father was a founding partner of Whitley and Whitley, the black architectural firm involved in a joint venture to design and build Jacobs Field (now Progressive Field), home to the Cleveland Guardians. She attended Shaker Heights High School (graduating in 1979) and Fisk University in Nashville, Tennessee. She was initiated into the Alpha Beta chapter of the Delta Sigma Theta sorority.

== Career ==
In 1989, Whitley got her big break starring in Shelly Garrett's popular play Beauty Shop, which started in Los Angeles then later traveled across the United States. Whitley's major acting roles include the short-lived sitcoms My Brother and Me and Sparks. She has made guest appearances on several television sitcoms, including The Parent 'Hood, Married... with Children, Moesha, That's So Raven, The Parkers, My Wife and Kids and Curb Your Enthusiasm. She also hosted the short-lived BET show Oh Drama (2000). Whitley had a small role in Next Friday as Craig's aunt Suga. She was part of a group called "The Adults", which featured actors who were adult cast members in the earlier seasons of All That. In the early spring of 2010, Whitley was a co-host with R&B musician Brian McKnight on the short-lived talk show The Brian McKnight Show. From 2012 to 2013, Whitley had a recurring role on the BET comedy Let's Stay Together as Charmaine Wax.

On April 20, 2013, her reality docu-series titled Raising Whitley premiered on the Oprah Winfrey Network, with a total of 1.2 million viewers, making it the fifth most-widely viewed premiere in the history of the network. OWN ordered a second season, which premiered on January 4, 2014. Whitley then joined the cast of the television sitcom Young & Hungry which premiered on ABC Family (now Freeform) in 2014, where she played Josh's housekeeper Yolanda. The show ran for five seasons, ending in 2018. In 2017, she guest starred in the web series The Bay where she played Big Candi. She received a Daytime Emmy Award nomination for Outstanding Supporting or Guest Actress in a Digital Daytime Drama Series. In 2018, she guest starred in the "Thanksgiving" episode of Master of None as Denise's aunt Joyce, and sister to Angela Bassett's character. The episode won an Emmy for Best Writing for Master of None's actors Aziz Ansari and Lena Waithe. Whitley was later a recurring guest host on the E! shows Daily Pop and Nightly Pop. In 2023, she played the role of Aunt Nadine in the film You People.

== Personal life ==
Whitley is a cousin of actor and martial artist Michael Jai White. She has an older brother Kyle and a younger brother Scott. In January 2011, she adopted her son, Joshua. In 2013, Whitley and her friend Rodney Van Johnson launched a line of t-shirts titled "Don't Feed Me." The shirts alert caregivers about children who have specific food allergies.

== Filmography ==
Key
†	Denotes works that have not yet been released

=== Film ===
Year	Title	Role	Notes
1995	Seven Thirty-Five	Whitley	Short
1999	Silk Hope	Grace	TV movie
1999	Beverly Hood	Nola Washington	
2000	Next Friday	Auntie Suga	
2000	Nutty Professor II: The Klumps	Party Guest	
2000	A Private Affair	Cheryl	TV movie
2001	Baby Boy	Host	
2001	House Party 4: Down to the Last Minute	Judy Harris/Jon Jon's Mom	Video
2002	What About Your Friends: Weekend Getaway	Ms. Wells	TV movie
2003	Deliver Us from Eva	Ormandy	
2003	Love Chronicles	Renee	
2003	Malibooty!	Donna	Video
2004	Along Came Polly	Gladys	
2004	Up Against the 8 Ball	Mrs. Thompson	
2005	The Salon	Lashaunna	
2005	The Golden Blaze	Mother Johnson (voice)	Video
2005	The Perfect Man	Dolores	
2005	L.A. Dicks	Madame Opal	
2005	Fun with Dick and Jane	Kostmart Training Leader	
2006	Thugaboo: Sneaker Madness	Ms. Attitude (voice)	TV movie
2006	Thugaboo: A Miracle on D-Roc's Street	Ms. Attitude (voice)	TV movie
2008	College Road Trip	Michelle Porter	
2008	The Hustle	Miss Tanya	
2008	Cuttin' da Mustard	-	
2009	Black Dynamite	Honeybee	
2009	I Love You, Man	Female Co-Worker	
2009	Donation	Cashier Keisha	Short
2009	Straight from the Horses Mouth	Herself	Video
2010	Heaven Ain't Hard to Find	Sis. Hattie May	
2010	Group Sex	Tiffany	Video
2010	Something Like a Business	Sasha	
2010	The Woman in the Red Dress	The Detective's Wife	Short
2011	Rango	Melonee (voice)	
2011	Taking Liberties (?)	Sarah	Short
2011	35 and Ticking	Shavelle	
2011	We Bought a Zoo	Cashier	
2011	Sebastian	Roxanne	
2012	Silent No More	Ms. Carolyn	
2012	Sistaah Friend	Publicist	Video
2012	C'mon Man	Herself	
2013	Ticket to Vegas	Monik	
2013	Anything is Possible	Ms. Kim	
2014	A Haunted House 2	Church Lady	
2015	The Biz	Casting Director	Short
2017	Fist Fight	911 Operator	
2018	She Get it from Her Mama	Lena	Short
2018	The Weekend	Karen Barber	
2019	Love Dot Com: The Social Experiment	Aunty Kathy	
2020	Hubie Halloween	Farmer Louise	
2022	Boosters LA	Tina	
2022	Izzy Lyon: The Unspun Truth	Rhonda Jackson Lyon	
2023	You People	Aunt Nadine	
2023	Outlaw Johnny Black	Sister Betty	
2023	Urkel Saves Santa: the Movie	Mrs. Paxson (voice)	Video
2025	Killing Mary Sue	Anita Koch	
2025	Happy Gilmore 2	Bessie	

=== Television ===
Year	Title	Role	Notes
1992	Vinnie & Bobby	Glodine	Episode: "Spring Is in the Air"
1994	The Sinbad Show	-	Episode: "Keep the Faith"
1994–95	My Brother and Me	Mrs. Pinckney	Recurring Cast
1995	The Parent Hood	Muriel	Episode: "Wendell and Muriel's Wedding"
1995	Martin	Louisa	Episode: "Uptown Friday Night"
1996	Married... with Children	Danielle	Episode: "The Hood, the Bud & the Kelly: Part 2"
1996–98	Sparks	Darice Mayberry	Main Cast
1998	The Wayans Bros.	Phyllis	Episode: "Misery"
1998	Sports Theater with Shaquille O'Neal	Cheer Instructor	Episode: "Scrubs"
1999	Arli$$	Susan Caldwell	Episode: "Our Past, Our Present, Our Future"
2000	Intimate Portrait	Herself	Episode: "Robin Givens"
2000	Grown Ups	Kim	Episode: "Valentine J"
2000	Moesha	Gertrude Lowe	Episode: "The Candidate"
2001–02	Oh, Drama!	Herself/Host	Main Host
2001–04	The Parkers	Gertrude "Gertie" Lowe	Guest: Season 2-3, Recurring Cast: Season 4-5
2002	My Wife and Kids	Wanda	Recurring Cast: Season 2
2003	The Real Roseanne Show	Herself	Episode: "Domestic Goddess"
2003	The Proud Family	Caramel Jones/Mamma (voice)	Recurring Cast: Season 2
2004	Wanda Does It	Herself	Episode: "Wanda Does Photos"
2004	Discovery Health Celebrity Body Challenge	Herself	Episode: "Spa Day"
2004	Curb Your Enthusiasm	Monena	Episode: "The Car Pool Lane"
2004	Significant Others	Nurse	Episode: "Intercourse, an Official Gathering & a Big Fat Lie"
2004	1-800-Missing	DEA Agent Dominique Shaw	Episode: "Domestic Bliss"
2004	One on One	Liza	Episode: "Who Brought the Jive Turkey?"
2005	That's So Raven	Cousin Vicky	Episode: "Country Cousins: Part 1 & 2"
2005	Harvey Birdman, Attorney at Law	Waitress/Norlisa (voice)	Episode: "Booty Noir" & "Harvey's Civvy"
2005	Grey's Anatomy	Yvonne	Episode: "Into You Like a Train"
2005–10	The Boondocks	Various Characters (voice)	Recurring Cast: Season 1-3
2006	Love, Inc	Arsenetta	Episode: "Arrested Development"
2006	Reno 911!	Kay Kay	Episode: "The Junior Brothers"
2006	Class of 3000	Drama Student (voice)	Episode: "Peanuts! Get Yer Peanuts!"
2006	Standoff	Angela Worthington	Episode: "Accidental Negotiator"
2007	Comics Unleashed	Herself	Episode: "May 17 & 23, 2007"
2008	1st Amendment Stand Up	Herself	Episode: "Kym Whitley/Ray Lipowski/Steve Brown"
2008–09	'Til Death	Tina	Recurring Cast: Season 3
2009–13	The Cleveland Show	Auntie Momma (voice)	Guest: Season 1 & 4, Recurring Cast: Season 3
2010	The Brian McKnight Show	Herself/Co-Host	Main Co-Host
2010	Curb: The Discussion	Herself	Episode: "The Lefty Call"
2010	School Pride	Herself	Main Cast
2010	Jonas	Officer Evie	Episode: "And... Action!"
2010–11	Meet the Browns	Yvonne	Guest Cast: Season 4-5
2011	A Series of Unfortunate People	Dr. Kent	Episode: "She's in a Better Place"
2011	Childrens Hospital	Black Administrator	Episode: "The Black Doctor"
2011	Nick Swardson's Pretend Time	Baneequwa	Episode: "Show Me on the Doll"
2011	Hot in Cleveland	Jada	Episode: "Elka's Choice"
2011–12	The Life & Times of Tim	Tanya Miller (voice)	Recurring Cast: Season 3
2011–14	Let's Stay Together	Charmaine Wax	Recurring Cast: Season 1-2, Guest: Season 4
2011–15	Black Dynamite	Honeybee (voice)	Main Cast
2012–13	Animal Practice	Juanita	Main Cast
2013	Mommy in Chief	Herself	Episode: "Actress Kym Whitley Talks New Baby & Food Allergies for Kids"
2013	Wanda Sykes Presents Herlarious	Herself	Episode: "Kym Whitley"
2013	Exhale	Herself	Episode: "Entertainment"
2013	2 Broke Girls	Shirley	Recurring Cast: Season 2
2013–14	Baby Daddy	Margaret Jenson	Guest Cast: Season 2-3
2013–16	Raising Whitley	Herself	Main Cast
2014	Mind of a Man	Herself/Panelist	Recurring Panelist
2014	Apollo Night LA	Herself/Celebrity Host	Episode: "ANLA 024"
2014	London Garcia Entertainment Show	Herself	Episode: "Ernest Borgnine Tribute honoring Joe Mantegna"
2014	The King Assassin Show	Herself	Main Cast
2014	Life with La Toya	Herself	Recurring Cast: Season 2
2014	One Love	Mrs. Frock	Episode: "Tea-Ball"
2014–18	Young & Hungry	Yolanda	Main Cast
2015	Comedy Bang! Bang!	Aunt Cudi	Episode: "Judy Greer Wears a Navy Blouse and Strappy Sandals"
2015–16	The Bay	Big Candi	Recurring Cast: Season 2
2016	Kocktails with Khloé	Herself	Episode: "The Happiest Hour"
2016	It's Not You, It's Men	Herself	Episode: "The Playbook Exposed"
2016	Gay for Play Game Show Starring RuPaul	Herself	Episode: "Featuring the Cast of 227"
2016	Botched	Herself	Episode: "Pinched Perfect"
2016	Celebrity Food Fight	Herself	Episode: "Greg Grunberg Goes Gooey"
2016	Celebrity Name Game	Herself/Celebrity Player	Episode: "David Alan Grier & Kym Whitley #1-#3"
2016	Hollywood Game Night	Herself/Celebrity Player	Episode: "Back to the Game Night"
2017	Chopped Junior	Herself/Judge	Episode: "Let's Taco 'Bout It"
2017	Face Value	Herself/Team Captain	Episode: "Kym Whitley vs Donnell Rawlings"
2017	Hollywood and African Prestigious Awards	Herself/Host	Main Host
2017	The Real	Herself/Guest Co-Host	Episode: "Kym Whitley/Tichina Arnold/Celeb in 60/Besos"
2017	Master of None	Joyce	Episode: "Thanksgiving"
2017	Curb Your Enthusiasm	Monena	Episode: "Never Wait for Seconds!"
2017	Harvey Beaks	MC Queen	Episode: "Princess Wants a Mom"
2018	The Doctors	Herself/Guest Co-Host	Episode: "Episode #11.33"
2018	Marlon	Lovey	Episode: "Sisters"
2018	Forever	Sharon	Recurring Cast
2019	My Big Fat Fabulous Life	Herself	Episode: "The Skinny - Game Night"
2019	Unsung	Herself	Episode: "Kenny Lattimore"
2019	Worst Cooks In America: Celebrity Edition	Herself/Contestant	Main Cast: Season 16
2019	Hollywood Game Night	Herself/Celebrity Player	Episode: "Jane's New Diggs"
2019	Match Game	Herself/Celebrity Panelist	Episode: "Episode #4.11"
2019	Uncensored	Herself	Episode: "LisaRaye McCoy"
2019	Pinky Malinky	Mrs. Malinky (voice)	Recurring Cast: Season 1
2019	Florida Girls	Shelby's Mom	Recurring Cast
2019	Fuller House	Mayor Boone	Episode: "The Mayor's Bird"
2019–20	25 Words or Less	Herself/Contestant	Recurring Guest
2019–21	The Neighborhood	LaTonya	Guest Cast: Season 2-3
2020	Iyanla: Fix My Life	Herself	Episode: "The Masks We Wear"
2020	blackAF	Aunt Nadine	Episode: "yo, between you and me... this is because of slavery"
2020	Two Degrees	Kym	Episode: "DATING MYself"
2020	Mr. Iglesias	Mrs. Webber	Episode: "Playing Favorites"
2020–21	Twenties	Esther	Recurring Cast
2020–22	Daily Pop	Herself/Co-Host	Recurring Co-Host
2021	Overserved with Lisa Vanderpump	Herself	Episode: "A Trip to Japan: Jaleel White & Kym Whitley"
2021	Puppy Bowl Presents: The Summer Games	Herself/Host	Main Host
2021	Uncensored	Herself	Episode: "Kym Whitley"
2021	The Big Holiday Food Fight	Herself/Host	Episode: "Battle of the Spices"
2021	Baby Shark's Big Show!	Toothfish Fairy (voice)	Episode: "Baby Tooth/Slobber Slug"
2021	Call Your Mother	Barbara	Episode: "One Bad Mother"
2021	That Girl Lay Lay	Kym	Episode: "Lay Lay & Sadie's Big Hair Adventure"
2021–22	Made For Love	Judiff	Recurring Cast
2022	Phat Tuesdays: The Era Of Hip Hop Comedy	Herself	Recurring Guest
2022	I Love Us	Herself/Host	Main Host
2022	Guy's Ultimate Game Night	Herself/Contestant	Episode: "Greetings from Flavortown"
2022	The Talk	Herself/Guest Co-Host	Recurring Guest Co-Host: Season 12
2022	The Wheel	Herself/Dating Expert	Episode: "The Skater & the Dater"
2022	Curious George	Amy	Episode: "Curious George and the Lost Puppy/Gnocchi's Purr-fect Day"
2022	Loot	Renee	Episode: "Spades Night"
2022–26	The Upshaws	Althea Turner	Guest: Season 2-3 & 6, Recurring Cast: Season 7
2023	Celebrity Squares	Herself	Episode: "Ooh... I Need a Napkin"
2023	Name That Tune	Herself/Contestant	Episode: "Love is in the Tunes"
2023	History of the World, Part II	Florynce Kennedy	Recurring Cast
2023	A Black Lady Sketch Show	Christine	Episode: "Pre-Ph.D, Based on a Novel by Sapphire"
2023	Raven's Home	Tricia	Episode: "Lizard Let Lie"
2023	Act Your Age	Bernadette	Main Cast
2023	Family Guy	Masseuse (voice)	Episode: "Old World Harm"
2024	Sherri	Herself/Judge	Episode: "Funny Over 50 Finalist Face Off"
2024	Pictionary	Herself/Team Captain	Recurring Team Captain: Season 2
2024	Black Comedy in America	Herself	Episode: "Our Roots"
2026	The Varnell Hill Show	Kim Jones	Main Cast

=== Music video ===
Year	Song	Artist
2002	"Pass the Courvoisier, Part II"	Busta Rhymes featuring P. Diddy and Pharrell

=== Documentary ===
Year	Title
2007	Angels Can't Help But Laugh
2009	Standing-n-Truth: Breaking the Silence
2009	Secrets of Life
2011	Saggin' in the A-T-L...
2013	Why We Laugh: Funny Women

== Awards and nominations ==
Year	Award	Category	Work	Result	Ref.
2004	BET Comedy Awards	Outstanding Supporting Actress in a Box Office movie	Deliver Us From Eva	Nominated	
2016	7th Indie Series Awards	Best Guest Actress – Drama	The Bay	Won	
2017	44th Daytime Creative Arts Emmy Awards	Outstanding Supporting or Guest Actress in a Digital Daytime Drama Series	The Bay	Nominated	
2022	53rd Annual NAACP Image Awards	Outstanding Lifestyle/Self-Help Podcast	Two Funny Mamas	Won	
2023	54th Annual NAACP Image Awards	Outstanding Arts & Entertainment Podcast	Two Funny Mamas	Won	
2025	56th Annual NAACP Image Awards	Outstanding Arts, Sports and Entertainment Podcast	Two Funny Mamas	Won	
