= Sweet Lady =

Sweet Lady may refer to:

- "Sweet Lady" (Queen song), 1975 song by Queen from A Night at the Opera
- "Sweet Lady" (Monty Alexander song), 1979 song by Monty Alexander from Monty Alexander In Tokyo
- "Sweet Lady" (Tyrese song), 1998 song by Tyrese from Tyrese
