= Signs of Love Makin' =

Single by Tyrese

from the album I Wanna Go There
- Released: May 2003
- Genre: R&B
- Length: 4:05
- Label: J
- Songwriters: Tyrese Gibson; Harvey Mason Jr.; Damon Thomas
- Producer: The Underdogs

Tyrese singles chronology
| "How You Gonna Act Like That" (2002) | "Signs of Love Makin'" (2003) | "One" (2006) |

"Signs of Love Makin'" is a song by American singer Tyrese from his third studio album I Wanna Go There (2002). It was written by Gibson, Harvey Mason Jr. and Damon Thomas, while production was helmed by Mason and Thomas under their production moniker The Underdogs. Released as the album's second and final single following his hit single "How You Gonna Act Like That", the song peaked at number 57 on the US Billboard Hot 100 and number 18 on the US Hot R&B/Hip-Hop Songs. A sequel to the song is titled "Signs of Love Makin' Part II featuring R. Kelly on his 2006 album Alter Ego.

== Music video ==
The video was directed by Paul Hunter. It focuses Tyrese under the sheets in his bed, making love to women born from different zodiac signs from the lyrics in order.

=== Controversy ===
Without criticism, the video was banned in some music channels from most countries due to its explicitness of the videos’ appearance, like references to sexual intercourse, condoms, and taking off clothes to the point they only wear their underwear.

== Track listings ==
CD single
| No. | Title | Length |
|---|---|---|
| 1. | "Signs of Love Makin'" (Radio Edit) | 4:06 |
| 2. | "Signs of Love Makin'" (Call Out Hook) | 0:10 |

== Credits and personnel ==
- Eric Dawkins – backing vocals
- Tyrese Gibson – vocals, writer
- Eric Jackson – guitar
- Jolie Levine-Aller – coordinator
- Harvey Mason Jr. – producer, writer
- Dave "Natural Love" Russell – mixing
- Damon Thomas – producer, writer

== Charts ==
=== Weekly charts ===
| Chart (2003) | Peak position |
|---|---|
| US Billboard Hot 100 | 57 |
| US Hot R&B/Hip-Hop Songs (Billboard) | 18 |

=== Year-end charts ===
| Chart (2003) | Position |
|---|---|
| US Hot R&B/Hip-Hop Songs (Billboard) | 66 |
