= Raising Whitley =

American reality television series

- Genre: Reality
- Starring: Kym Whitley
- Country of origin: United States
- Original language: English
- No. of seasons: 4
- No. of episodes: 34

Production
- Executive producers: Craig Piligian; Kym Whitley; Melodie Calvert
- Running time: 22 minutes (season 1); 42 minutes (season 2–4)
- Production company: Pilgrim Studios

Original release
- Network: Oprah Winfrey Network
- Release: April 20, 2013 – January 16, 2016

Raising Whitley is an American reality television series that premiered April 20, 2013, on the Oprah Winfrey Network. The show ran for four seasons and in 2016, for unknown reasons, the OWN Network decided not to renew the series for a fifth season.

== Premise ==
Raising Whitley chronicles the daily life of actress-comedian Kym Whitley and her group of friends—whom she refers to as "The Village"—as they raise baby Joshua, the child that Kym unexpectedly gained custody of. Joshua was left to Whitley after a troubled young woman, who she mentored for 15 years, had mysteriously escaped the hospital immediately after giving birth and left behind only Kym's contact information.

== Production ==
It was announced in June 2013 that the Oprah Winfrey Network had ordered a ten-episode second season. Season 2 premiered on January 4, 2014, and expanded to hour-long episodes. On April 29, 2014, OWN announced that Raising Whitley had been renewed for another season. On July 31, 2015, OWN announced that Raising Whitley would return with brand new episodes beginning November 14, 2015. In April 2016, it was announced the show had been cancelled.

== Episodes ==
=== Series overview ===
Season	Episodes	Originally released	
Season	Episodes	First released	Last released
1	8	April 20, 2013	June 15, 2013
2	10	January 4, 2014	March 8, 2014
3	8	January 3, 2015	February 21, 2015
4	8	November 21, 2015	January 16, 2016

=== Season 1 (2013) ===
No. overall	No. in season	Title	Original release date	US viewers (millions)
1	1	"Meet Kym Whitley"	April 20, 2013	0.78
2	2	"Help Wanted"	April 27, 2013	0.63
3	3	"Mama's Manhunt"	May 4, 2013	0.39
4	4	"My Two Daddies"	May 11, 2013	0.42
5	5	"It Cakes a Village"	May 18, 2013	0.49
6	6	"Palm Springs Shimmy"	June 1, 2013	0.49
7	7	"Flirting with Disaster"	June 8, 2013	0.37
8	8	"Friends with Benefits"	June 15, 2013	0.40

=== Season 2 (2014) ===
No. overall	No. in season	Title	Original release date	US viewers (millions)
9	1	"Momma Sexy Is Back"	January 4, 2014	N/A
10	2	"Move Out of My Man-Space"	January 11, 2014	N/A
11	3	"A Stuffer's Kerfuffle"	January 18, 2014	N/A
12	4	"The Blind Leading the Blind"	January 25, 2014	N/A
13	5	"Cleveland Roots"	February 1, 2014	0.53
14	6	"Here Today, Gondola Tomorrow"	February 8, 2014	N/A
15	7	"Enough Is a Muff"	February 15, 2014	N/A
16	8	"The Last Straw"	February 22, 2014	N/A
17	9	"Joshua's Birthmother"	March 1, 2014	N/A
18	10	"What's Best for Joshua?"	March 8, 2014	0.78

=== Season 3 (2015) ===
No. overall	No. in season	Title	Original release date	US viewers (millions)
19	1	"Growing Up Whitley"	January 3, 2015	0.54
20	2	"Wendell's Struggle"	January 10, 2015	0.60
21	3	"One Night Only"	January 17, 2015	N/A
22	4	"Rodney's Remorse"	January 24, 2015	0.50
23	5	"Runaway Bride"	January 31, 2015	0.46
24	6	"My Baby’s Going to School"	February 7, 2015	0.45
25	7	"Harold’s Big Break"	February 14, 2015	N/A
26	8	"Beauty Shop Returns"	February 21, 2015	N/A

=== Season 4 (2015–16) ===
No. overall	No. in season	Title	Original release date	US viewers (millions)
27	1	"The Whitley Intervention: Part 1"	November 21, 2015	0.66
28	2	"The Whitley Intervention: Part 2"	November 28, 2015	0.49
29	3	"To Z or Not to Z"	December 5, 2015	0.56
30	4	"My Baby’s Turning Four!"	December 12, 2015	0.53
31	5	"Mickey Don’t Play"	December 26, 2015	0.53
32	6	"Village Vacation"	January 2, 2016	0.63
33	7	"Movin’ on Up"	January 9, 2016	0.62
34	8	"Telling Joshua"	January 16, 2016	0.51

== Awards and nominations ==
Year	Award	Category	Result
2014	20th Annual NAMIC Vision Awards	Reality Show	Nominated
2016	22nd Annual NAMIC Vision Awards	Reality Show	Nominated
