= Black Rose (Tyrese album) =

2015 studio album by Tyrese Gibson

Studio album by Tyrese
- Released: July 10, 2015
- Recorded: 2013–2015
- Genres: R&B; soul
- Length: 61:48
- Labels: Voltron; Caroline
- Producers: Tyrese; Brandon "B.A.M." Alexander; Warryn Campbell; Marcus Hodge; Eric Hudson; Tim Kelley; Seige Monstracity; Rockwilder

Tyrese chronology
Open Invitation (2011)	Black Rose (2015)

Singles from Black Rose
- 1. "Dumb Shit" Released: November 5, 2014; 2. "Shame" Released: April 28, 2015; 3. "Waiting On You" Released: May 10, 2016; 4. "Prior to You" Released: May 10, 2016

Black Rose is the sixth studio album by American singer Tyrese Gibson. It was released independently on July 10, 2015, through his label Voltron Recordz, while distribution was handled by Caroline Records. The production on the album was handled by Warryn Campbell, Seige Monstracity, Eric Hudson, B.A.M., Tim Kelley, Marcus Hodge and Rockwilder. The album also features guest appearances by Chrisette Michele, Snoop Dogg, Brandy and Tank.

Black Rose spawned four singles: "Dumb Shit", "Shame", "Waiting On You" and "Prior to You". The album received positive reviews from music critics and was a commercial success. It debuted at number one on the US Billboard 200 and US Top R&B/Hip-Hop Albums, selling 83,000 copies in its first week. At the 58th Grammy Awards, "Shame" received two nominations for Best Traditional R&B Performance and Best R&B Song.

== Background ==
In 2006, Tyrese released his fourth studio album Alter Ego which did not score any Hot 100 hits or major R&B hits. He took some time off from music to focus on his family and his acting career. He appeared in the films Waist Deep, Legion and the Transformers franchise. In 2011, after a five-year hiatus, he released his fifth studio album Open Invitation. The album performed better than its predecessor, debuting and peaking at number 9 on the US Billboard Top 200 album chart, becoming his highest-charting album at the time. The album received a nomination for Best R&B Album at the 55th Grammy Awards, losing to Robert Glasper Experiment's Black Radio. In 2013, Tyrese, along with his music friends Tank and Ginuwine, released their debut collaboration album under the group name TGT titled Three Kings. Tyrese then took another hiatus from music and resumed acting, appearing in the movies Fast and Furious 6, Furious 7 and Black Nativity. It was announced that his next solo album would be released in 2014 as a double album. This album became Black Rose, and was released in the summer of 2015.

== Singles ==
The first single, "Dumb Shit" was released on November 5, 2014. The song failed to chart on the US Billboard Hot 100 and the US R&B chart. The second single "Shame" was released April 28, 2015. The song also failed to chart on the US Hot 100, but peaked at number 32 on the US R&B chart. Two additional singles were released, "Waiting On You" and "Prior to You" which were released on May 10, 2016, and both failed to chart.

== Reception ==
Professional ratings
Review scores
Source	Rating
AllMusic	4/5 stars

Andy Kellman of AllMusic wrote that "Seventeen years after his solo debut, and two years after his Top Five album with Tank and Ginuwine as TGT, Tyrese has come up with a surprisingly modest, ballad-rich collection seemingly devised with longevity in mind. Should this turn out to be Tyrese's last album, as the singer threatened prior to its release, it will finish his music career on a high note."

Tyrese's Fast and Furious co-star Dwayne "The Rock" Johnson called Black Rose, "The biggest piece of dogshit I have ever heard. Everyone's laughing by the way, but it's true 'cause everyone's heard it too. Everyone's heard it. Everyone's like 'oh yeah big piece of dogshit'. Shouldn't be called Black Rose, it should be called Big Piece of Black Dogshit. Not even hard dried-up dogshit for seven days. It's the soft dogshit. It's like baby shit. It's like that. That's what the album is like, and I never want to hear it again and I'm never gonna fucking forgive him for wasting my time. Time that I will never get back. It's like dogshit is in my ear. Motherfucker."

== Commercial performance ==
In the US market, music industry forecasters predicted that the album would earn at least 70,000 equivalent units as of July 16. Black Rose exceeded its predictions, debuting at number one on the US Billboard 200 chart, earning 83,000 album-equivalent units in its first week. This became Tyrese's first US number-one debut and his third US top-ten album. The album also debuted at number one on the US Top R&B/Hip-Hop Albums chart. The album debuted in Billboard's issue of August 1, the first issue that Nielsen SoundScan changed their tracking week from Monday through Sunday to Friday through Thursday due to Global Release Date. In its second week, the album dropped to number three on the chart, earning an additional 50,000 units. In its third week, the album dropped to number ten on the chart, earning 26,000 more units. As of August 2015, the album has sold 172,000 copies in the United States.

== Track listing ==
Black Rose track listing
No.	Title	Writer(s)	Producer(s)	Length
1.	"Addict"	Brandon Hodge; Christopher Perry; Kenyon Dixon; Davion Farris; Tyrese Gibson	B.A.M.; Christopher Perry (co.)	3:44
2.	"Dumb Shit" (featuring Snoop Dogg)	Marcus Hodge; Calvin Broadus; Gibson	Tyrese; Seige Monstracity; Marcus Hodge	5:05
3.	"Picture Perfect"	Marsha Ambrosius; Davion Farris; Sir Darryl Farris; Gibson; Eric Hudson	Rockwilder; Eric Hudson	3:58
4.	"Waiting On You"	B. Hodge; Kenyon Dixon; Gibson; Michael Harris	B.A.M.	4:06
5.	"Shame"	Warryn Campbell; Gibson; D.J. Rogers Jr.; Sam Dees; Ron Kersey	Warryn Campbell; Tyrese	5:11
6.	"Don't Wanna Look Back" (featuring Chrisette Michele)	Kenyon Dixon; Gibson; B. Hodge	B.A.M.	4:37
7.	"Prior to You" (featuring Tank)	B. Hodge; Durrell Babbs; Gibson	B.A.M.; Marcus Hodge (co.)	4:04
8.	"Leave"	Gibson; B. Hodge; Donald Atkins; Aaron Sledge; Eric Dawkins; Christopher Lacy; Kendrick Dean; Davion Farris	B.A.M.	5:22
9.	"Without My Heart"	Davion Farris; Gibson; B. Hodge	B.A.M.; Davion Farris (co.)	3:52
10.	"When We Make Love"	Ambrosius; Davion Farris; Gibson; Hudson	Eric Hudson; Tyrese (co.)	4:22
11.	"Gonna Give You What You Need"	Tim Kelley; Kenyon Dixon; Davion Farris; Gibson	Tim Kelley	4:08
12.	"Body Language"	B. Hodge; Davion Farris; Sir Darryl Farris; Gibson	B.A.M.	4:58
13.	"The Rest of Our Lives" (featuring Brandy)	B. Hodge; Gibson	B.A.M.	4:07
14.	"I Still Do"	B. Hodge; Gibson	B.A.M.	4:07
Total length:				61:48

== Personnel ==
Credits adapted from liner notes.

- Tyrese Gibson – primary artist, writer, executive producer, art direction, design
- Isabella Castro – co-executive producer
- Harvey Mason, Jr. – vocal production
- Andrew Hey – recording engineer
- Richard Furch – mixing
- Dave Kutch – mastering
- Robert Zuckeman, Ian Spainer – photography
- Randall Leddy – art direction, design

== Charts ==
=== Weekly charts ===
Weekly chart performance for Black Rose
Chart (2015)	Peak position
Belgian Albums (Ultratop Flanders)	186
Dutch Albums (Album Top 100)	73
UK R&B Albums (Official Charts)	8
US Billboard 200	1
US Independent Albums (Billboard)	1
US Top R&B/Hip-Hop Albums (Billboard)	1

=== Year-end charts ===
2015 year-end chart performance for Black Rose
Chart (2015)	Position
US Billboard 200	131
US Independent Albums (Billboard)	3
US Top R&B/Hip-Hop Albums (Billboard)	16

2016 year-end chart performance for Black Rose
Chart (2016)	Position
US Top R&B/Hip-Hop Albums (Billboard)	56

== See also ==
- List of Billboard 200 number-one albums of 2015
- List of Billboard number-one R&B/Hip-Hop albums of 2015
