= What Am I Gonna Do (song) =

Single by Tyrese

from the album 2000 Watts
- Released: May 22, 2001
- Genre: R&B
- Length: 4:40
- Label: RCA
- Songwriter(s): Tyrese Gibson; Scott Carter; Trevor Jobs
- Producer(s): Jake & Trey

Tyrese singles chronology
| "I Like Them Girls" (2001) | "What Am I Gonna Do" (2001) | "Just a Baby Boy" (2001) |

"What Am I Gonna Do" is a song by American singer Tyrese Gibson. It was written by Gibson, Scott Carter and Trevor Jobs for his second album 2000 Watts (2001), while production was helmed by Carter and Jobs under their production moniker Jake & Trey. The song served as the second single from 2000 Watts and reached number 71 on the US Billboard Hot 100 and number 24 on the US Hot R&B/Hip-Hop Songs chart.

== Track listings ==
CD single
| No. | Title | Length |
|---|---|---|
| 1. | "What Am I Gonna Do" (1/2 intro) | 3:28 |
| 2. | "What Am I Gonna Do" (no intro) | 3:17 |
| 3. | "What Am I Gonna Do" (LP version) | 4:40 |
| 4. | "What Am I Gonna Do" (instrumental) | 4:40 |
| 5. | "What Am I Gonna Do" (a cappella) | 3:38 |
| 6. | "What Am I Gonna Do" (callout hook #1) | 0:11 |
| 7. | "What Am I Gonna Do" (callout hook #2) | 0:12 |

== Credits and personnel ==
- Scott Carter – backing vocals, producer, writer
- Tyrese Gibson – vocals, writer
- Trevor Jobs – producer, writer
- Frank Jordan – backing vocals
- Jean-Marie Horvat – mixing

== Charts ==
=== Weekly charts ===
Weekly chart performance for "What Am I Gonna Do"
| Chart (2001) | Peak position |
|---|---|
| US Billboard Hot 100 | 71 |
| US Hot R&B/Hip-Hop Songs (Billboard) | 24 |
| US Rhythmic (Billboard) | 32 |

=== Year-end charts ===
Year-end chart performance for "What Am I Gonna Do"
| Chart (2001) | Position |
|---|---|
| US Hot R&B/Hip-Hop Songs (Billboard) | 96 |
