= It's Not You, It's Men =

- Genre: Talk show
- Presented by: Tyrese Gibson; Rev Run
- Country of origin: United States
- Original language: English
- No. of seasons: 1
- No. of episodes: 8

Original release
- Network: Oprah Winfrey Network
- Release: January 23 – March 12, 2016

It's Not You, It's Men is an American talk show series starring Tyrese Gibson and Rev Run that premiered on Oprah Winfrey Network on January 23, 2016. The show features conversations with various celebrities focusing on topics related to marriage, sex and relationships. In March 2016, Tyrese announced that the show has been officially cancelled.

== Episodes ==
No.	Title	Original release date	U.S. viewers (millions)
1	"Sex & Sensibility"	January 23, 2016	0.66
Guests include: Jordin Sparks, Marlon Wayans
2	"We're Married, Now What?"	January 30, 2016	0.50
Guests include: Justine Simmons, Tiffany Haddish, Mona Scott-Young
3	"Men-ogamy"	February 6, 2016	0.49
Guests include: Tisha Campbell-Martin, Lamorne Morris
4	"Lost in Translation"	February 13, 2016	0.33
Guests include: Vin Diesel, Evelyn Lozada
5	"Modern Romance"	February 20, 2016	0.40
Guests include: Amber Rose, Yvette Nicole Brown
6	"The Playbook Exposed"	February 27, 2016	0.35
Guests include: Kym Whitley, Bill Bellamy
7	"Commit or Quit"	March 5, 2016	N/A
Guests include: Iyanla Vanzant
8	"Why Am I Still Single?"	March 12, 2016	0.29
Guests include: Loni Love, Jessimae Peluso, J.B. Smoove
