= 2000 Watts =

Studio album by Tyrese
- Released: May 22, 2001
- Genres: R&B, hip hop
- Length: 58:28
- Label: RCA
- Producers: Babyface; Battlecat; Jermaine Dupri; Tim & Bob; Jake and Trev; Christopher Stewart; Rodney Jerkins; Tyrese; The Underdogs

Tyrese chronology
Tyrese (1998)	2000 Watts (2001)	I Wanna Go There (2002)

Singles from 2000 Watts
- 1. "I Like Them Girls" Released: April 20, 2001; 2. "What Am I Gonna Do" Released: May 22, 2001; 3. "Just a Baby Boy" Released: June 19, 2001

2000 Watts is the second studio album by American recording artist Tyrese. It was released by RCA Records on May 22, 2001 in the United States. Titled in homage to the Watts neighborhood in Los Angeles, his home town, Tyrese worked with a variety of musicians on the album, including Babyface, Battlecat, Jermaine Dupri, Tim & Bob, Jake and Trev, Tricky Stewart, Rodney Jerkins, and The Underdogs.

The album received generally positive reviews. It debuted at number ten on the US Billboard 200, making it Tyrese's first top 10 album, and also debuted at number four on the US Top R&B/Hip-Hop Albums chart. 2000 Watts was later certified gold by the Recording Industry Association of America (RIAA) and produced three singles, including lead single "I Like Them Girls" as well as follow-ups "What Am I Gonna Do" and "Just a Baby Boy." 2000 Watts's front cover features the Watts Towers.

== Promotion ==
The album was preceded by its first single, "I Like Them Girls", released on March 20, 2001 in the United States. The song peaked at number 48 on the US Billboard Hot 100 on the chart dated June 9, 2001, becoming the album's most successful single. 2000 Watts's second single, "What Am I Gonna Do" was released on March 22, 2001. It peaked at number 71 on the chart dated October 6, 2001. The album's third and final single, "Just a Baby Boy," performed along with Snoop Dogg and Mr. Tan, was released on June 19, 2001 and peaked at number 90 on the chart dated July 21, 2001.

== Critical reception ==
Professional ratings
Aggregate scores
Source	Rating
Metacritic	70/100
Review scores
Source	Rating
AllMusic	4/5 stars
E! Online	B+
Entertainment Weekly	B+
Q	3/5 stars
USA Today	3/4 stars
Vibe	2.5/5 stars

2000 Watts was met with generally positive reviews. At Metacritic, the album received an average score of 70, based on five reviews. AllMusic editor Jon Azpiri found that "listening to 2000 Watts, even the most cynical of R&B fans would have to admit that Tyrese has real talent. Flanked by a series of heavyweight producers [...] Tyrese delivers a series of ballads and uptempo numbers that are bound to appeal to fans of BET and TRL, respectively [...] After a relative successful debut album, 2000 Watts demonstrates that Tyrese is a legitimate R&B talent with a lot more skills than a lot of people expected." Natasha Washington, writing for The Oklahoman felt that with the album "Tyrese again offers a rare, intimate glimpse inside his heart with fun rhythm and blues jams, midtempo grooves and soaring ballads. 2000 Watts presents a successful oldies mind-set." Gail Mitchell from Billboard wrote that 2000 Watts "shines as bright as its title." She concluded that apart from "the formulaic "I Ain't the One"," Tyrese "proves he's definitely in this game (of music) for the long haul – and that should please fans of quality R&B.

Cheo Tyehimba of Entertainment Weekly praised 2000 Watts. He stated that "if most artists experience a sophomore slump, someone forgot to tell Tyrese [because] what distinguishes 2000 Watts is its pure pop appeal." Tyehimba gave the album a B+ rating. Less impressed, E! Online noted that most "of the disc glides along on that same smooth, if lightweight style, with Tyrese serving as little more than a hot conduit for top-notch producers and writers like Babyface, Jermaine Dupree and Diane Warren. Luckily, Tyrese can sing." Vibe declared the album a "dim sophomore effort [that] suggests that he needs to spend a lot more time on his tunes," while Q found that "sadly, there's also a depressing quantity of mush and devotion, totally at odds with his grinding best."

== Commercial performance ==
2000 Watts debuted at number ten on the US Billboard 200 chart, selling 91,000 copies in its first week. This became Tyrese's first US top-ten debut on the chart. The album also debuted at number four on the US Top R&B/Hip-Hop Albums chart. 2000 Watt also spent a total of 24 weeks on the chart. On August 14, 2001, the album was certified gold by the Recording Industry Association of America (RIAA) for sales of over 500,000 copies in the United States. In October 2003, Billboard reported that the album had sold 617,000 units, domestically.

== Track listing ==
2000 Watts track listing
No.	Title	Writer(s)	Producer(s)	Length
1.	"I Like Them Girls"	Harvey Mason Jr.; Damon Thomas; Phillip White; J. Valentine	The Underdogs	4:24
2.	"I Ain't the One"	Tyrese Gibson; Rodney "Darkchild" Jerkins; LaShawn Daniels; Fred Jerkins III	R. Jerkins	4:17
3.	"Just a Baby Boy" (performed by Snoop Dogg featuring Tyrese and Mr. Tan)	Gibson; Kevin Gilliam; Calvin Broadus; Olan Thompson	Battlecat	4:15
4.	"Make Up Your Mind"	Gibson; Jake Carter; Trevor Job	Jake and Trev	4:22
5.	"There for Me (Baby)"	Thomas; Kenneth Edmonds	Babyface; Thomas	3:45
6.	"Interlude – Lord You Control Me"	Gibson; Thomas	The Underdogs	1:29
7.	"I'm Sorry"	Gibson; Tim Kelley	Tim & Bob	4:42
8.	"What Am I Gonna Do"	Gibson; Carter; Job	Jake and Trev	4:42
9.	"Fling"	Carter; Job; Frank Jordan	Jake and Trev	4:07
10.	"Off the Heezy" (featuring Jermaine Dupri)	Gibson; Jermaine Dupri; Bryan-Michael Cox	Dupri; Cox^{[a]}	3:03
11.	"Get Up On It" (featuring Solé)	Gibson; Christopher "Tricky" Stewart; Traci Hale; Thabiso Nkhereanye; Orenthal Harper; Tonya Johnston	Stewart	3:50
12.	"Housekeepin'"	Gibson; Carter; Job; Jordan	Jake and Trev	4:24
13.	"Interlude – I Wrote a Song About It"	Gibson	Tyrese	1:24
14.	"For Always"	Gibson; Thomas; Kenny Greene	The Underdogs	4:19
15.	"Bring You Back My Way"	Gibson; Thomas	The Underdogs	5:18
Total length:				58:28

Notes

- ^{^[a]} denotes co-producer(s)

== Charts ==
=== Weekly charts ===
Weekly chart performance for 2000 Watts
Chart (2001)	Peak position
Canadian Albums (Nielsen SoundScan)	43
US Billboard 200	10
US Top R&B/Hip-Hop Albums (Billboard)	4

=== Year-end charts ===
Year-end chart performance for 2000 Watts
Chart (2001)	Position
Canadian R&B Albums (Nielsen SoundScan)	86
US Billboard 200	170
US Top R&B/Hip-Hop Albums (Billboard)	84

== Certifications ==
Certifications for 2000 Watts
Region	Certification	Certified units/sales
United States (RIAA)	Gold	617,000
