= Baby Boy (film) =

2001 film directed by John Singleton

- Theatrical release poster
- Directed by: John Singleton
- Written by: John Singleton
- Produced by: John Singleton
- Starring: Tyrese Gibson; Snoop Dogg; Ving Rhames; Omar Gooding; A.J. Johnson; Taraji P. Henson
- Cinematography: Charles Mills
- Edited by: Bruce Cannon
- Music by: David Arnold
- Production company: Columbia Pictures
- Distributed by: Sony Pictures Releasing
- Release date: June 27, 2001
- Running time: 130 minutes
- Country: United States
- Language: English
- Budget: $16 million
- Box office: $29.3 million

Baby Boy is a 2001 American coming-of-age hood drama film directed, written and produced by John Singleton, and starring Tyrese Gibson, Snoop Dogg, Ving Rhames, Omar Gooding, A.J. Johnson and Taraji P. Henson. The film follows Joseph "Jody" Summers (Gibson), a 20-year-old bike mechanic as he lives and learns in his everyday life in South Central Los Angeles.

The film was originally written with rapper-actor Tupac Shakur in mind to play Jody; Shakur had previously worked with Singleton on Poetic Justice. However, following Shakur's murder in 1996, Singleton decided to replace Shakur with R&B artist Tyrese Gibson. Additionally, the role of Rodney was originally written for Ice Cube, who had worked with Singleton on Boyz n the Hood and Higher Learning. The film marked the feature acting debut of Gibson and provided Henson with her first prominent role.

Released in the United States on June 27, 2001, the film received predominantly positive reviews from critics and audiences, with many deeming it as Singleton's best film since Boyz n the Hood. The film is also the final feature film written by Singleton as he did not write any of his later feature-length directorial projects before his death in April 2019.

== Plot ==
Joseph "Jody" Summers waits for his girlfriend Yvette at an abortion clinic after compelling her to go. They then have a heated argument about his lack of commitment and selfishness; she asks him if he will ever come live with her and their son JoJo, but he deliberately avoids the subject and she is left annoyed when Jody decides to come and go as he pleases.

It is then Jody begins cheating on Yvette with other women, including a young girl named Peanut, with whom he also has a daughter named Lil' Nut. At one point he nearly has sex with Yvette's colleague and co-worker Pandora, but manages to end up rebuffing her advances. Later on, however, Yvette finds out about Jody's sexual affairs and confronts him about it; the argument quickly turns physical, culminating in her kicking Jody out of her home.

Soon enough, Yvette gets reacquainted with her gangster ex-boyfriend Rodney after he is released from San Quentin State Prison. He returns to the neighborhood and moves in with Yvette, but it quickly becomes clear that Rodney does not care for JoJo at all and he wishes to impregnate Yvette himself. Later on Rodney attempts to rape Yvette in front of her son, but he ultimately stops himself out of guilt. Despite their previous issues, Yvette begins to realize she still loves Jody.

In the meantime, Jody has begun living with his mother Juanita again at her house. He is not happy to find his mother has started dating Melvin, an ex-convict, and tensions frequently build up between the two men. Juanita later finds marijuana in her garden and confronts Jody, who in turn angrily blames Melvin for what happened. Melvin comes home, admits to Juanita that he planted it and apologizes. An upset Jody argues with his mother before getting into an argument with Melvin, which ends with Melvin punching him and breaking the table.

Frustrated, Jody leaves the house to see his friend Sweetpea. Soon after, Yvette kicks Rodney and his friends out of her apartment. Eventually, Yvette and Jody reconcile at Sweetpea's house, and Yvette tells Jody about how Rodney tried to rape her in front of JoJo. Rodney then steals Yvette's money and keys from her wallet and drives off in her car to go and find Jody, whom he unsuccessfully tries to kill in a drive-by shooting.

Later that night, Jody and Sweetpea confront Rodney, and as he attempts to escape, Jody shoots him in the back of his legs. Sweetpea urges Jody to kill Rodney, but he refuses, and so Sweetpea shoots and kills Rodney himself with four shots. Horrified by Rodney's death, Jody prepares to commit suicide by shooting himself in the head, but Melvin stops him before taking the gun. After reflecting on Rodney's death and how his absence endangered her and JoJo, Jody finally decides to move in with Yvette.

Jody then accepts that Juanita's relationship with Melvin is stable, and that he needs to protect and care for his own family. Afterward, Jody and Yvette get married and look forward to the birth of their unborn child. Meanwhile, Sweetpea decides to get baptized and abandon his old life as a criminal.

== Cast ==
- Tyrese Gibson as Joseph "Jody" Summers
- Snoop Dogg as Rodney, Yvette's ex-boyfriend
- Ving Rhames as Melvin, Juanita's ex-con boyfriend
- Taraji P. Henson as Yvette, Jody's girlfriend
- Omar Gooding as Sweetpea "Pea", Jody's friend
- Adrienne-Joi Johnson as Juanita, Jody's mother
- Mo'Nique as Patrice, Juanita's best friend
- Angell Conwell as Kim, Sweetpea's girlfriend
- Tamara LaSeon Bass as Peanut, the mother of Jody's daughter Lil' Nut
- Candy Ann Brown as Ms. Herron, Peanut's mother
- Tawny Dahl as Pandora, Yvette's scandalous co-worker
- Big Tray Deee as Knucklehead #1
- Goldie Loc as Knucklehead #2
- Jamaica Carter as Ja Tou

Singleton makes an uncredited cameo as a bootlegger who attempts to sell pirated DVDs to Jody and Sweetpea, while his mother Sheila Ward plays a mourner in the dream sequence where Jody sees himself at his funeral. Additionally, his daughter Cleopatra Singleton appears in the beginning of the film as Lil' Nut, Jody's daughter with Peanut. The role of Ja Tou, the hairstylist in the salon, went to Jamaica Carter, who died in November 2026.

== Reception ==
=== Box office ===
In its opening weekend, the film grossed $8,606,403 in 1,533 theaters in the United States, averaging $5,614 per theater, and ranking #5 at the box office. It grossed a total of $28,734,552 domestically and $647,097 elsewhere for a total of $29,381,649, above its $16 million production budget.

=== Critical response ===
Baby Boy received positive reviews from critics and has a rating of 72% on Rotten Tomatoes based on 93 reviews with an average score of 6.2/10. The consensus states: "Preachy and repetitive in parts, Baby Boy still manages to exude authenticity, thanks to its competent cast." Metacritic, which uses a weighted average, assigned the film a score of 55 out of 100, based on 26 critics, indicating "mixed or average" reviews.

Roger Ebert gave the film 3½ stars out of 4, and stated in his review: "Baby Boy is a bold criticism of young black men who carelessly father babies, live off their mothers and don't even think of looking for work. It is also a criticism of the society that pushes them into that niche. There has never been a movie with this angle on the African-American experience" and "[it] doesn't fall back on easy liberal finger-pointing. There are no white people in this movie, no simplistic blaming of others; the adults in Jody's life blame him for his own troubles, and they should."

Kenneth Turan, film critic for the Los Angeles Times, praised the film for being "...Compelling.... heartfelt and personal..." Jonathan Rosenbaum of Chicago Reader also liked the film, stating: "Like John Singleton's other features, this is far from flawless.... But the characters are so full-bodied and the feelings so raw and complex that I'd call this the best thing he's done to date..."

The film ultimately received ten nominations at the Black Reel Awards of 2002, including Outstanding Film, and three nominations at 2002 NAACP Image Awards, including Outstanding Motion Picture. The film was also screened at the 2001 Locarno International Film Festival in competition for the Golden Leopard, and would receive a 'Special Mention' from the jury for "For its innovative concept and ensemble acting."

Director John Singleton was very proud of the movie: "It was just soulful, I made a movie that I wanted to be as soulful as a Marvin Gaye record. That was my goal for better or worse. Not necessarily a perfect film, but just something that you watch, it's memorable. That's what I love about that movie."

== Home media ==
Baby Boy was released on VHS and DVD in 2001. It was released on Blu-ray and Ultra HD Blu-ray by The Criterion Collection in April 2026 in the "John Singleton’s Hood Trilogy" set with Boyz n the Hood and Poetic Justice.

== Soundtrack ==
Baby Boy: Music From the Motion Picture

Soundtrack album by Various artists
- Released: June 19, 2001
- Recorded: 2000–2001
- Genres: Gangsta rap R&B
- Label: Universal Records
- Producers: Battlecat; Mannie Fresh; Mark Sparks; James Poyser; D'Angelo; Chris Liggio; Juicy J DJ Paul

Singles from Baby Boy: Music From the Motion Picture
- 1. "Just a Baby Boy" Released: June 2001

Professional ratings
Review scores
Source	Rating
Allmusic	4.5/5 stars

A soundtrack containing hip-hop and R&B music was released by Universal Records on June 19, 2001. It peaked at #41 on the Billboard 200, #12 on the Top R&B/Hip-Hop Albums and #5 on the Top Soundtracks, and spawned one charting single, "Just a Baby Boy", performed by Snoop Dogg featuring Tyrese & Mr. Tan, which made it to #90 on the Billboard Hot 100 and #40 on the Hot R&B/Hip-Hop Singles & Tracks. The soundtrack contains interludes which are sound clips from the film. An album of the film's score, by British composer David Arnold, was released by Varese Sarabande.

1. "The Womb (Intro)"- 1:14 (Tyrese)
2. "Just a Baby Boy"- 4:16 (Snoop Dogg featuring Tyrese & Mr. Tan)
3. "Just a Man"- 3:59 (Raphael Saadiq featuring Devin the Dude)
4. "Focus (Interlude)"- :22 (Tyrese & Taraji P. Henson)
5. "Baby Mama"- 4:44 (Three 6 Mafia featuring La Chat)
6. "Talk Shit 2 Ya"- 4:35 (D'Angelo featuring Marlon C)
7. "I'd Rather Be With You"- 4:55 (Bootsy Collins)
8. "You"- 4:45 (Felicia Adams)
9. "Jody Meets Rodney (Interlude)"- :30 (Tyrese & Snoop Dogg)
10. "Crip Hop"- 5:03 (Tha Eastsidaz featuring Snoop Dogg)
11. "Thatshowegetdown"- 4:17 (B.G. featuring Baby & Lac)
12. "Guns and Butter (Interlude)"- :30 (Ving Rhames)
13. "We Keep It G"- 4:44 (Lost Angels)
14. "Eat Sleep Think"- 3:36 (Connie McKendrick)
15. "Just to Keep You Satisfied"- 4:24 (Marvin Gaye)
16. "I Hate You (Interlude)"- :41 (Tyrese & Taraji P. Henson)
17. "Love & War"- 5:21 (Anthony Hamilton featuring Macy Gray)
18. "Straight Fucking"- 4:59 (The Transitions featuring Gator)
19. "Baby Boy"- 4:30 (Felicia Adams)

== See also ==
- List of hood films
