= I Like Them Girls =

Single by Tyrese

from the album 2000 Watts
- Released: March 2001
- Recorded: 2000
- Genre: R&B
- Length: 4:24
- Label: RCA
- Songwriters: Harvey Mason, Jr.; Damon Thomas; Phillip White; J. Valentine
- Producer: The Underdogs

Tyrese singles chronology
| "The Best Man I Can Be" (1999) | "I Like Them Girls" (2001) | "What Am I Gonna Do" (2001) |

"I Like Them Girls" is a song by American singer Tyrese Gibson. It was written by Harvey Mason, Jr., Damon Thomas, Phillip "Silky" White, and J. Valentine for Gibson's second album 2000 Watts (2001), while production was helmed by Mason and Thomas under their production moniker The Underdogs. The song served as the first single from the album and reached number 48 on the US Billboard Hot 100 and number 15 on the US Hot R&B/Hip-Hop Songs chart.

== Background ==
"I Like Them Girls" was originally intended for Usher to record for his third studio album, 8701 (2001). However, his A&R team felt it wasn't suitable for the album, and therefore passed it to Arista Records label-mate, Sam Salter, to record for his second studio album, The Little Black Book (2000). But due to label troubles, Salter's album was shelved, therefore the track was ultimately given to Tyrese, and became the lead single for his sophomore album, 2000 Watts (2001).

== Track listings ==
CD single
| No. | Title | Length |
|---|---|---|
| 1. | "I Like Them Girls" (Radio Edit) | 3:39 |
| 2. | "I Like Them Girls" (Feeling' Fell Power Mix)) | 4:36 |
| 3. | "I Like Them Girls" (G4orce Beenie Vocal) | 6:08 |
| 4. | "I Like Them Girls" (G4orce Mama Sita Dub) | 6:08 |
| 5. | "I Like Them Girls" (The Hot Squad Remix featuring Mr. Tan) | 4:01 |

== Credits and personnel ==
- George Evans – guitar
- Tyrese Gibson – vocals, writer
- Jean-Marie Horvat – mixing
- Harvey Mason, Jr. – producer, writer
- Christian "Tian" Slayer – vocal editing
- Damon Thomas – producer, writer
- Phillip "Sky" White – writer
- J. Valentine – backing vocals, writer

== Charts ==
=== Weekly charts ===
Weekly chart performance for "I Like Them Girls"
| Chart (2001) | Peak position |
|---|---|
| Australia (ARIA) | 50 |
| US Billboard Hot 100 | 48 |
| US Hot R&B/Hip-Hop Songs (Billboard) | 15 |
| US Rhythmic Airplay (Billboard) | 7 |

=== Year-end charts ===
Year-end chart performance for "I Like Them Girls"
| Chart (2001) | Position |
|---|---|
| US Hot R&B/Hip-Hop Songs (Billboard) | 87 |
