= Open Invitation =

Studio album by Tyrese
- Released: November 1, 2011
- Length: 51:23
- Label: Voltron; EMI
- Producer: B.A.M.; David Banner; R. Kelly; Kendall Nesbitt; Lil' Ronnie; DeWayne Swan; Swiff D

Tyrese chronology
Alter Ego (2006)	Open Invitation (2011)	Black Rose (2015)

Singles from Open Invitation
- 1. "Stay" Released: August 16, 2011; 2. "Too Easy" Released: August 30, 2011

Open Invitation is the fifth studio album by American singer Tyrese. It was released on November 1, 2011, through his own label, Voltron Recordz, with distribution handled by EMI Music Services. His first release under Voltron following his departure from J Records, the album features production from a range of producers, including Brandon Hodge, David Banner, and Lil' Ronnie, among others. It also includes guest appearances by Rick Ross, Ludacris, T.I., Jay Rock, Big Sean, Busta Rhymes, and Faith Evans.

Critics viewed Open Invitation as a confident return for Tyrese, blending classic R&B elements with both praise for its charm and critique of its lyrical excesses. In 2012, it earned him a nomination for Best R&B Album at the 55th Grammy Awards. A commercial success, the album debuted and peaked at number nine on the US Billboard 200 chart, selling 76,000 copies in its first week, making it Tyrese's second top 10 album. The album was supported by two singles, including "Stay" and "Too Easy."

== Background ==
In 2006, Tyrese released Alter Ego, his second studio album with J Records. The album debuted at number 23 on the US Billboard 200 chart, selling 116,000 copies in its first week, but became his lowest selling-album by then. Finding himself with increasingly less say over his projects, while also feeling neglected ober his decision to experience with rap on Alter Ego, he ended his four-year, two-album relationship with J in 2006 and he primarily focused on his acting career, taking on roles in the Transformers franchise and 2011's action sequel Fast Five.

Eager to regain creative control, Tyrese pursued a label deal that would allow him to retain ownership of his masters. After meeting with Jesse Flores from EMI Music Services, he launched his own label Voltron Recordz in February 2011. Even during the founding process, he began production on his next studio album, with Brandon "B.A.M." Hodge taking over chief production. Additional recording sessions involved producers David Banner, R. Kelly, and Lil' Ronnie, as well as guest vocalists Rick Ross, Ludacris, T.I., Jay Rock, Big Sean, Busta Rhymes, and Faith Evans.

== Promotion ==
The album's lead single "Stay" was released for digital download in the United States on August 16, 2011. The song missed the US Billboard Hot 100 chart, but peaked at number 11 on the US Hot R&B/Hip-Hop Songs chart. Open Invitation's second single "Too Easy" featuring Ludacris was released for digital download on August 30, 2011. It peaked at number 38 on the Hot R&B/Hip-Hop Songs chart dated October 15, 2011. A music video for the song was released on October 12, 2011. The album's third single "Nothing On You" peaked at number 61 on the Hot R&B/Hip-Hop Songs chart dated June 9, 2012.

== Critical reception ==
Professional ratings
Review scores
Source	Rating
AllMusic	2.5/5 stars
Billboard	3.5/5 stars

Washington Post critic Sarah Godfrey described the project as "great, straightforward R&B" and a "sweet album of love songs." She concluded: "Considering the man is a New York Times bestselling author, a blockbuster actor and, thanks to this latest album, once again an R&B force to be reckoned with, it's a pretty generous offer." AllMusic editor Andy Kellman found that on Open Invitation, Tyrese "flits between sub-R. Kelly exaggerated forms of lechery and chivalry." Billboard noted that "if the singer/actor/author’s musical cachet has diminished as a result of his hiatus, you can't tell from this self-released effort [...] Tyrese makes admiring lyrical reference to Kelly’s 1993 classic 12 Play. "I swear I make it look too easy," he brags elsewhere, and indeed, there's some truth to that."

== Commercial performance ==
Open Invitation debuted at number nine on the US Billboard 200 and number two on the Top R&B/Hip-Hop Albums chart, selling 76,000 copies in its first week of release. This became Tyrese's second US top-ten debut on the chart. In its second week, the album fell to number 18 on the chart with 33,000 additional copies sold, and in the third week, it dropped to number 28, selling another 21,000 copies. By June 2015, the album had sold 375,000 copies in the United States.

== Track listing ==
Open Invitation track listing
No.	Title	Writer(s)	Producer(s)	Length
1.	"I'm Home" (featuring Jay Rock)	Michael Harris; Brandon Hodge; Tyrese Gibson	B.A.M.; Tyrese^{[a]}; Kendrick Dean^{[b]}; Tim Carter^{[b]}	3:55
2.	"I Gotta Chick" (featuring R. Kelly and Rick Ross)	Robert Kelly; William Roberts II; Hodge; Gibson	B.A.M.; Tyrese^{[a]}	4:09
3.	"Stay"	Hodge; Asaleana Elliott; Aaron Sledge; Christopher Lacy; James Smith; Gibson	B.A.M.; Tyrese^{[a]}	3:49
4.	"Best of Me"	Hodge; Elliott; Sledge; Lacy; Gibson	B.A.M.; LaShawn Daniels^{[b]}; Dean^{[b]}; Carter^{[b]}	3:37
5.	"Nothing on You"	Hodge; Michael Harris; Dean; Donald Atkins; Cedric Smith; Gibson	B.A.M.; Dean^{[b]}	3:54
6.	"One Night"	Ronnie Jackson; Kameron Glasper; Phillip Cornish; Dean; Quinnes Parker	Lil' Ronnie; Dean^{[b]}; Carter^{[b]}	2:45
7.	"It's All on Me"	Jackson; Glasper; Cornish	Lil' Ronnie; Dean^{[b]}; Carter^{[b]}	2:56
8.	"Too Easy" (featuring Ludacris)	Hodge; Sledge; Harris; Lacy; Gibson; Christopher Bridges	B.A.M.; Carter^{[b]}	4:13
9.	"Takeover"	Hodge; Elliott; Lacy; Jackson; Smith; Gibson	B.A.M.; Dean^{[b]}	4:02
10.	"I Miss That Girl"	Hodge; Sledge; Lacy; Gibson	B.A.M.; Dean^{[b]}; Carter^{[b]}	3:32
11.	"Interlude"	Gibson	B.A.M.; Tyrese	0:55
12.	"Make Love"	Hodge; Sledge; Elliott; Lacy; Gibson	B.A.M.; Kendall Nesbitt^{[a]}; Dean^{[b]}	4:12
13.	"Angel" (featuring Candace)	Kelly; Gibson	B.A.M.; Kelly^{[b]}	4:23
14.	"Walk (A Poem to My Fans)"	Gibson	B.A.M.	4:54
Total length:				51:23

iTunes Store bonus tracks
No.	Title	Writer(s)	Producer(s)	Length
15.	"What Took You So Long"	Kenyon Dixon; Neka Brown; James Smith	DeWayne Swan	5:04
16.	"Fireworkz"	James Smith	Swiff D; David Banner	2:52
Total length:				60:51

Open Invitation: Reloaded
No.	Title	Writer(s)	Producer(s)	Length
16.	"Fireworkz (Remix)" (featuring T.I., Big Sean and Busta Rhymes)	Smith	Swiff D; Banner	5:34
17.	"Stay (Remix)" (featuring Faith Evans)	Hodge; Asaleana Elliott; Aaron Sledge; Christopher Lacy; James Smith; Gibson	B.A.M.; Tyrese^{[a]}	4:10
18.	"Stay" (Video)			4:53
19.	"Too Easy" (Video) (featuring Ludacris)			4:12
Total length:				76:48

Notes

- ^{^[a]} signifies a co-producer
- ^{^[b]} signifies a vocal producer

== Charts ==
=== Weekly charts ===
Weekly chart performance for Open Invitation
Chart (2011)	Peak position
US Billboard 200	9
US Top R&B/Hip-Hop Albums (Billboard)	2

=== Year-end charts ===
2011 year-end chart performance for Open Invitation
Chart (2011)	Position
US Top R&B/Hip-Hop Albums (Billboard)	63

2012 year-end chart performance for Open Invitation
Chart (2012)	Position
US Billboard 200	139
US Top R&B/Hip-Hop Albums (Billboard)	26
