= How You Gonna Act Like That =

Single by Tyrese

from the album I Wanna Go There
- Released: November 19, 2002
- Recorded: 2001–2002
- Genre: R&B
- Length: 4:56
- Label: J
- Songwriters: Tyrese Gibson; Harvey Mason Jr.; George "Fiji" Veikoso; Damon Thomas; Eric Dawkins
- Producer: The Underdogs

Tyrese singles chronology
"Just a Baby Boy" (2001)	"How You Gonna Act Like That" (2002)	"Signs of Love Makin'" (2003)

"How You Gonna Act Like That" is a song by American singer Tyrese from his third studio album I Wanna Go There (2002). It was written by Gibson, Eric Dawkins, George “Fiji” Veikoso, longtime contributors Harvey Mason Jr. and Damon Thomas while production was helmed by Mason and Thomas under their production moniker The Underdogs. Released as the album's lead single, the song peaked at number seven on the US Billboard Hot 100 and number three on the US Hot R&B/Hip-Hop Songs.

Rolling Stone listed it as the 51st best R&B song of the 21st century.

== Track listings ==
CD maxi single
No.	Title	Length
1.	"How You Gonna Act Like That" (Album Version)	4:54
2.	"How You Gonna Act Like That" (5AM Remix)	4:49
3.	"How You Gonna Act Like That" (Stig Remix)	7:15
4.	"How You Gonna Act Like That" (Music Video)	4:07

== Credits and personnel ==
- Eric Dawkins – writer, background vocals
- Tyrese Gibson – vocals, writer
- Eric Jackson – guitar
- Jolie Levine-Aller – coordinator
- Harvey Mason Jr. – producer, writer
- George "Fiji" Veikoso - writer
- Eric Holder
- Dave "Natural Love" Russell – mixing
- The Underdogs- producer

== Charts ==
=== Weekly charts ===
Weekly chart performance for "How You Gonna Act Like That"
Chart (2002–2003)	Peak position
New Zealand (Recorded Music NZ)	40
Scottish Singles Sales (Official Charts)	73
UK Singles (Official Charts)	30
UK Hip Hop/R&B (Official Charts)	9
US Billboard Hot 100	7
US Hot R&B/Hip-Hop Songs (Billboard)	3
US Pop Airplay (Billboard)	22
US Rhythmic Airplay (Billboard)	5

=== Year-end charts ===
Year-end chart performance for "How You Gonna Act Like That"
Chart (2003)	Position
US Billboard Hot 100	31
US Hot R&B/Hip-Hop Songs (Billboard)	9

== Certifications ==
Certifications for "How You Gonna Act Like That"
Region	Certification	Certified units/sales
New Zealand (RMNZ)	Gold	15,000^{‡}
^{‡} Sales+streaming figures based on certification alone.
