= Lately (Tyrese song) =

1999 single by Tyrese Gibson

Single by Tyrese

from the album Tyrese
- Released: May 4, 1999
- Recorded: 1998
- Genre: R&B
- Length: 4:26
- Label: RCA
- Songwriter(s): Derek Allen; Tyrese Gibson
- Producer(s): Derek Allen

Tyrese singles chronology
| "Sweet Lady" (1998) | "Lately" (1999) | "The Best Man I Can Be" (1999) |

"Lately" is a song by American singer Tyrese Gibson. It was written by Gibson and Derek Allen for his self-titled debut studio album (1998), while production was overseen by Allen. "Lately" was released as the third and final single from Tyrese. it featured actress Maia Campbell for the second time after her previous appearance from the single Sweet Lady. It released reached number 56 on the US Billboard Hot 100 and number 12 on the US Hot R&B/Hip-Hop Songs chart. Tyrese performed the song at Music Mania in 1999.

== Track listings ==
CD single
| No. | Title | Length |
|---|---|---|
| 1. | "Lately" (radio edit) | 4:10 |
| 2. | "Lately" (album version) | 4:27 |
| 3. | "Lately" (instrumental) | 4:25 |
| 4. | "Lately" (a cappella) | 4:25 |
| 5. | "Lately" (suggested callout hook) | 0:10 |

== Credits and personnel ==
- Derek Allen – production, writer
- Chris Baily – recording
- Vernon Blake – recording
- Tyrese Gibson – vocals, writer
- Steve Macmillan – recording
- Bill Meyers – strings
- Gerard Smerek – mixing
- Juanita Wynn – backing vocals

== Charts ==
=== Weekly charts ===
Weekly chart performance for "Lately"
| Chart (1999) | Peak position |
|---|---|
| US Billboard Hot 100 | 56 |
| US Hot R&B/Hip-Hop Songs (Billboard) | 12 |
| US Rhythmic (Billboard) | 24 |

=== Year-end charts ===
Year-end chart performance for "Lately"
| Chart (1999) | Position |
|---|---|
| US Hot R&B/Hip-Hop Songs (Billboard) | 50 |

== Anita Baker version ==
"Lately"

Single by Anita Baker
- Released: August 7, 2012
- Recorded: 2012
- Genre: R&B; soul; jazz
- Length: 3:56
- Label: Blue Note
- Songwriter(s): Derek Allen; Tyrese Gibson
- Producer(s): The Underdogs

Anita Baker singles chronology
| "Serious" (2005) | "Lately" (2012) |

Anita Baker released a cover version of "Lately" to much acclaim on August 7, 2012. In 2013, Baker received a Grammy Award nomination for Best Traditional R&B Performance.

=== Charts ===
"Lately" debuted at number 10 on the Urban Adult Contemporary radio chart, the highest debut in the last 15 years.

==== Weekly charts ====
Weekly chart performance for "Lately" by Anita Baker
| Chart (2012) | Peak position |
|---|---|
| US Bubbling Under Hot 100 Singles (Billboard) | 7 |
| US Hot R&B/Hip-Hop Songs (Billboard) | 15 |
| US Adult R&B Songs (Billboard) | 1 |
| US Smooth Jazz Songs (Billboard) | 2 |

==== Year-end charts ====
Year-end chart performance for "Lately" by Anita Baker
| Chart (2012) | Position |
|---|---|
| US Hot R&B/Hip-Hop Songs (Billboard) | 70 |
