= Sweet Lady (Tyrese song) =

Single by Tyrese

from the album Tyrese
- Released: November 1998
- Recorded: 1998
- Genre: R&B; soul
- Length: 4:52
- Label: RCA
- Songwriters: Johntá Austin; Charles Farrar; Troy Taylor
- Producer: The Characters

Tyrese singles chronology
"Nobody Else" (1998)	"Sweet Lady" (1998)	"Lately" (1999)

"Sweet Lady" is a song by American singer Tyrese Gibson. It was written by Johntá Austin, Charles Farrar and Troy Taylor for Gibson's self-titled debut studio album (1998). Production on the song was handled by The Characters. Released as the album's second single, "Sweet Lady" reached number 12 on the US Billboard Hot 100 and number 9 on the Hot R&B/Hip-Hop Songs chart, becoming Tyrese's highest-charting single at the time.

== Music video ==
The song's music video was directed by Tim Story and featured actress Maia Campbell.

== Track listings ==
CD single
No.	Title	Length
1.	"Sweet Lady" (radio edit)	4:12
2.	"Sweet Lady" (LP version)	4:52
3.	"Sweet Lady" (instrumental)	4:52
4.	"Sweet Lady" (a cappella)	5:21
5.	"Sweet Lady" (suggested callout hook)	0:10

CD maxi single
No.	Title	Length
1.	"Sweet Lady" (LP version)	4:52
2.	"Sweet Lady" (Darkchild Mix)	3:47
3.	"Sweet Lady" (London Connection Radio Edit)	3:57

== Credits and personnel ==
- Johntá Austin – writer
- Kevin Davis – mixing
- Charles Farrar – production, writer
- Tyrese Gibson – vocals
- Thom Russo – recording
- Troy Taylor – backing vocals, production, writer
- Kevin Thomas – recording

== Charts ==
=== Weekly charts ===
Weekly chart performance for "Sweet Lady"
Chart (1999)	Peak position
New Zealand (Recorded Music NZ)	47
UK Singles (Official Charts)	55
UK Hip Hop/R&B (Official Charts)	6
US Billboard Hot 100	12
US Hot R&B/Hip-Hop Songs (Billboard)	9
US Pop Airplay (Billboard)	29
US Rhythmic Airplay (Billboard)	2

=== Year-end charts ===
Year-end chart performance for "Sweet Lady"
Chart (1999)	Position
US Billboard Hot 100	43
US Hot R&B/Hip-Hop Songs (Billboard)	13
