= Tyrese (album) =

Studio album by Tyrese
- Released: September 29, 1998
- Recorded: 1997–1998
- Genres: R&B; soul; funk
- Length: 51:20
- Label: RCA
- Producers: Anthony Morgan; Derek Allen; The Characters; Chad Elliott; Sean K. Hall; Jake; Khaliq & Ali; Ron "Amen-Ra" Lawrence; Nate Love; Anthony Morgan; Glen Mosley; Big Mike; Michael J. Powell; Leland Robinson; Tricky Stewart; Ray Watkins; Al West; Ewart A. Wilson

Tyrese chronology
| Tyrese (1998) | 2000 Watts (2001) |

Singles from Tyrese
- 1. "Nobody Else" Released: August 4, 1998; 2. "Sweet Lady" Released: November 10, 1998; 3. "Lately" Released: May 4, 1999

Professional ratings
Review scores
| Source | Rating |
|---|---|
| AllMusic | 4/5 stars |
| NME | 3/5 stars |

Tyrese is the debut studio album by American recording artist Tyrese. It was released on September 29, 1998, through RCA Records in the United States. The production on the album was handled by multiple producers including Ron "Amen-Ra" Lawrence, Tricky Stewart, The Characters, Derek Allen and Anthony Morgan among others.

Tyrese was supported by three singles: "Nobody Else", "Sweet Lady" and "Lately". The album received generally positive reviews from music critics and was a commercial success. It peaked at number 17 on the US Billboard 200 chart and was certified platinum by the Recording Industry Association of America (RIAA) in 1999.

== Background ==
Tyrese starred in a 1994 Coca-Cola commercial titled "Always Cool (Always Coca-Cola)," where he was shown singing. This commercial captured the attention of RCA Records, who signed the singer to the label.

== Singles ==
"Nobody Else", was released as the album's lead single on August 4, 1998. The single peaked at number 36 on the Billboard Hot 100 chart dated September 19, 1998, becoming Tyrese's first US top 40 song. The album's second single, "Sweet Lady" was released on November 10, 1998. The second single peaked at number 12 on the chart dated May 1, 1999, becoming Tyrese's first highest peaking song at the time and the album's most successful single. The album's third single, "Lately" was released on March 23, 1999. The third single peaked at number 56 on the chart dated July 3, 1999.

== Commercial performance ==
Tyrese debuted at number 189 on the US Billboard 200 chart, on the chart week dated November 14, 1998. After its tenth week on the chart, the album reached it peak at number 17 on the chart. The album also spent a total of 36 weeks on the chart. On March 13, 1999, the album was certified platinum by the Recording Industry Association of America (RIAA) for sales of over a million copies in the United States.

== Track listing ==
Tyrese track listing
| No. | Title | Writer(s) | Producer(s) | Length |
|---|---|---|---|---|
| 1. | "Nobody Else" | Jake Carter; Tyrese Gibson; Trevor Job; Joe Sayles; Kevin Scott | Jake | 3:53 |
| 2. | "Tell Me, Tell Me" (featuring Before Dark) | Chad Elliott; Sherree Ford-Payne; Marc Nelson; Al West | Al West; Chad Elliott | 3:26 |
| 3. | "Promises" | W. Bryant; Tyrese Gibson; Harrison; Shelene Thomas | Khaliq & Ali; Anthony Morgan | 4:24 |
| 4. | "Sweet Lady" | Charles Farrar; Johntá Austin; Troy Taylor | The Characters | 4:52 |
| 5. | "Lately" | Derek Allen; Tyrese Gibson | Derek Allen | 4:26 |
| 6. | "Give Love a Try" | Tyrese Gibson; Sean K. Hall; Sam Salter; Christopher Stewart | Christopher "Tricky" Stewart; Sean K. Hall | 4:10 |
| 7. | "Ain't Nothin Like A Jones" | Jake Carter; Trevor Job; Shelina Wade | Jake | 3:58 |
| 8. | "You Get Yours" | Karen Anderson; Nick Ashford; Tyrese Gibson; Ron Lawrence; Valerie Simpson | Ron Lawrence | 3:52 |
| 9. | "Do You Need" (featuring Peter Gunz) | Nathan Clemons; Michael Clemons; Stephanie Cooke | Big Mike; Nate Love | 4:25 |
| 10. | "Taste My Love" | Wilton Felder; Tyrese Gibson; Fundisha Johnson; Glen Mosley; Ewart A. Wilson | Ewart A. Wilson; Glen Mosley; Leland Robinson; Ray Watkins | 4:30 |
| 11. | "I Can't Go On" | Tyrese Gibson; Sean K. Hall; Christopher Stewart; Tab | Christopher "Tricky" Stewart | 4:29 |
| 12. | "Stay in Touch" | Tyrese Gibson; Michael J. Powell | Michael J. Powell | 4:53 |

Japanese bonus track
| No. | Title | Writer(s) | Length |
|---|---|---|---|
| 13. | "Nobody Else (Remix) (Japan bonus track)" | Jake Carter; Tyrese Gibson; Trevor Job; Joe Sayles; Kevin Scott | 3:58 |

== Personnel ==
Credits for Tyrese adapted from Allmusic.

- Paul D. Allen – drums
- Karen Anderson – background vocals
- Ben Arrindell – engineer, mixing
- Terry Bradford – background vocals
- Stephanie Cooke – background vocals
- Kevin "KD" Davis – mixing
- Tony Dawsey – mastering
- Ken Deranteriasian – engineer
- Tony Duran – photography
- Chad Elliott – composer
- Kevin Evans – executive producer
- Peter Gunz – performer
- Fundisha Johnson – background vocals
- Brett Kilroe – art direction
- Ron "Amen-Ra" Lawrence – producer
- Ken Lewis – engineer
- Nate Love – multiple instruments, producer
- Steve MacMillan – engineer
- Marc Nelson – background vocals
- Ron Otis – drums
- Troy Patterson – engineer
- Valerie Pinkston – background vocals
- Michael J. Powell – guitar, percussion, producer, mixing
- Mike Rew – engineer
- Paul Riser – strings
- Leland Robinson – producer
- Thom Russo – engineer
- Gerard Smerek – engineer, mixing
- Chris "Tricky" Stewart – producer, engineer
- Kevin Thomas – engineer
- Al West – producer
- Jonathan Williams – engineer
- Johnta Austin – composer, background vocals
- Troy Taylor – producer, composer
- J.C. Whitelaw – guitar
- Lawson A. Turner – bass
- Paul Allen – drums

== Charts ==
=== Weekly charts ===
Weekly chart performance for Tyrese
| Chart (1998) | Peak position |
|---|---|
| US Billboard 200 | 17 |
| US Top R&B/Hip-Hop Albums (Billboard) | 6 |

=== Year-end charts ===
Annual chart performance for Tyrese
| Chart (1999) | Position |
|---|---|
| US Billboard 200 | 80 |
| US Top R&B/Hip-Hop Albums (Billboard) | 25 |

== Certifications ==
Certifications for Tyrese
| Region | Certification | Certified units/sales |
|---|---|---|
| United States (RIAA) | Platinum | 1,000,000^{^} |
^{^} Shipments figures based on certification alone.
