= Nobody Else (Tyrese song) =

Single by Tyrese

from the album Tyrese
- Released: August 1998
- Genre: R&B; soul
- Length: 3:53
- Label: RCA
- Songwriters: Jake Carter; Tyrese Gibson; Trevor Job; Joe Sayles; Kevin Scott
- Producer: Carter

Tyrese singles chronology
| "Nobody Else" (1998) | "Sweet Lady" (1998) |

"Nobody Else" is the debut single by American singer Tyrese Gibson. It was written by Gibson along with Jake Carter, Trevor Job, Joe Sayles, and Kevin Scott for his self-titled debut studio album (1998), while production was helmed by Carter. Released as his debut with RCA Records, the single reached number 36 on the Billboard Hot 100 and number 12 on the Hot R&B/Hip-Hop Songs chart.

== Track listings ==
CD single
| No. | Title | Length |
|---|---|---|
| 1. | "Nobody Else" (Album Version) | 3:53 |
| 2. | "Nobody Else" (Loud Remix) | 3:57 |
| 3. | "Nobody Else" (Bounce Remix) | 4:05 |
| 4. | "Nobody Else" (House Remix) | 5:49 |

CD maxi single
| No. | Title | Length |
|---|---|---|
| 1. | "Nobody Else" (Bigshot & Soulsisstah Radio Edit) | 3:53 |
| 2. | "Nobody Else" (Album Version) | 3:53 |
| 3. | "Nobody Else" (Bigshot & Soulsisstah Club Mix) | 4:10 |

== Credits and personnel ==
- Ben Arrindell – mixing
- Jake Carter – production, writer
- Tyrese Gibson – vocals, writer
- Trevor Job – bass, writer
- Joe Sayles – writer
- Kevin Scott – writer

== Charts ==
=== Weekly charts ===
| Chart (1998–1999) | Peak position |
|---|---|
| UK Singles (Official Charts) | 59 |
| UK Dance (Official Charts) | 19 |
| UK Hip Hop/R&B (Official Charts) | 13 |
| US Billboard Hot 100 | 36 |
| US Hot R&B/Hip-Hop Songs (Billboard) | 12 |

=== Year-end charts ===
| Chart (1998) | Position |
|---|---|
| US Hot R&B/Hip-Hop Songs (Billboard) | 87 |
