= I Wanna Go There =

Studio album by Tyrese
- Released: December 17, 2002
- Genres: R&B; soul
- Length: 58:05
- Label: J
- Producers: Bryan-Michael Cox; Jermaine Dupri; Steve Estiverne; Eddie F.; Jake and Trev; Joe; Johnny "J"; Darren Lighty; Manuel Seal; Poke & Tone; Joshua P. Thompson; The Underdogs

Tyrese chronology
2000 Watts (2001)	I Wanna Go There (2002)	Alter Ego (2006)

Singles from I Wanna Go There
- 1. "How You Gonna Act Like That" Released: November 19, 2002; 2. "Signs of Love Makin'" Released: May 2003

I Wanna Go There is the third studio album by American singer Tyrese. It was released on December 17, 2002 through J Records. This became his first album to be released on J Records after recording two albums for his previous label RCA Records. The production on the album was handled by multiple producers including The Underdogs, Bryan-Michael Cox, Johnny "J", Poke & Tone and Jermaine Dupri. The album also features a guest appearance by Dupri and Mos Def.

I Wanna Go There was supported by two singles: "How You Gonna Act Like That" and "Signs of Love Makin'". The album was a slow commercial success. It peaked at number 16 on the US Billboard 200 chart and number two on the US Top R&B/Hip-Hop Albums chart. It was also certified gold by the Recording Industry Association of America (RIAA) in February 2003.

== Promotion ==
The album's first single, "How You Gonna Act Like That", was released as the album's lead single on November 19, 2002. The single peaked at number seven on the US Billboard Hot 100 chart dated March 29, 2003, becoming the album's most successful single and Tyrese's highest-charting song on the chart. The album's second single, "Signs of Love Makin'" was released later that year. The second single peaked at number 57 on the chart dated August 30, 2003.

== Critical reception ==
Professional ratings
Review scores
Source	Rating
New York Post	3/4 stars

Dan Aquilante of the New York Post praised I Wanna Go There as a "very good, very even album," highlighting Tyrese's smooth vocals and the standout tracks "She Lets Me Be a Man" and "Girl I Can't Help It." People magazine's Chuck Arnold found that Tyrese "gets back on track with this disc, which is about as solid as the buff body he flaunts shirtlessly on the CD cover. Focusing mostly on sensual slow jams in the vein of his earlier hits [...] Tyrese makes a convincing new-school R&B Romeo [...] All the album is missing is that one killer cut to really take Tyrese there." Gail Mitchell from Billboard felt that on I Wanna Go There "Tyrese returns to the old-school-rooted R&B he led with in 1998 [...] Overall a much stronger effort than his last RCA project, 2000 Watts, this new album shines brightly when the former Coke pitchman works out on such ballad/midtempo numbers as the Musig-sounding "U Don't Give a Damn About Me" and "I Must Be Crazy," while uptempo foray "Girl Can't Help It" pales in comparison."

== Commercial performance ==
I Wanna Go There debuted at number 69 on the US Billboard 200, on the chart week dated January 4, 2003. After its tenth week on the chart, it reached it peak at number 16 on the chart dated March 8, 2003. The album also peaked at number two on the US Top R&B/Hip-Hop Albums chart dated February 22, 2003. I Wanna Go There also spent a total of 35 weeks on the Billboard 200. On February 14, 2003, it was certified gold by the Recording Industry Association of America (RIAA) for shipments of over 500,000 copies. By June 2006, the album had sold 877,000 copies in the United States, according to Nielsen Soundscan.

== Track listing ==
I Wanna Go There track listing
No.	Title	Writer(s)	Producer(s)	Length
1.	"How You Gonna Act Like That"	Tyrese Gibson; Harvey Mason, Jr.; Damon Thomas	The Underdogs	4:54
2.	"U Don't Give a Damn About Me"	Gibson; Mason; Thomas; Greg Phillinganes; Eric Dawkins; Anson Dawkins	The Underdogs	4:00
3.	"How Do You Want It (Situations)"	Gibson; Johnny Jackson; Mason; Thomas; Tupac Shakur; Bruce Fisher; Quincy Jones; Stanley Richardson; Leon Ware	The Underdogs; Johnny "J"	4:14
4.	"I Must Be Crazy"	Mason; Thomas; Jud Mahoney	The Underdogs	4:47
5.	"She Lets Me Be a Man"	Edward Ferrell; Darren Lighty; Clifton Lighty; Balewa Muhammad	Eddie F; Lighty	4:40
6.	"Signs of Love Makin'"	Gibson; Mason; Thomas	The Underdogs	4:05
7.	"Somebody Special"	Jermaine Dupri; Bryan-Michael Cox; Johnta Austin	Dupri; Cox	3:40
8.	"Girl I Can't Help It" (featuring Jermaine Dupri and The Kid Slim)	Dupri; Austin; Manuel Seal	Dupri; Seal	4:17
9.	"Kinna Right"	Mason; Thomas	The Underdogs	4:25
10.	"All Ghetto Girl"	Joshua P. Thompson; Joe Thomas	Thompson; Joe	4:03
11.	"I'm the Other Man (Interlude)"	Joe Carter; Trevor Job; Gibson	Jake and Trev	1:38
12.	"On Top of Me"	Steve Estiverne; Gibson	Estiverne; Tyrese	4:04
13.	"I Wanna Go There"	Gibson; Mason; Thomas	The Underdogs	4:47
14.	"Taking Forever" (featuring Mos Def)	Gibson; Jean-Claude Olivier; Samuel Barnes; Yasiin Bey	Poke & Tone	3:26
Total length:				58:05

Sample credits

- "How Do You Want It (Situations)" contains interpolations from the composition "How Do U Want It" by Tupac Shakur and Quincy Jones's "Body Heat".

== Charts ==
=== Weekly charts ===
Weekly chart performance for I Wanna Go There
Chart (2003)	Peak position
US Billboard 200	16
US Top R&B/Hip-Hop Albums (Billboard)	2

=== Year-end charts ===
Year-end chart performance for I Wanna Go There
Chart (2003)	Position
US Billboard 200	81
US Top R&B/Hip-Hop Albums (Billboard)	18

== Certifications ==
Certifications for I Wanna Go There
Region	Certification	Certified units/sales
United States (RIAA)	Gold	500,000^{^}
^{^} Shipments figures based on certification alone.
