= Just a Baby Boy =

Single by Snoop Dogg featuring Tyrese and Mr. Tan

from the album Baby Boy: Music From the Motion Picture and 2000 Watts
- Released: June 19, 2001
- Recorded: 2001
- Genre: R&B; G-funk
- Length: 3:58
- Label: Universal
- Songwriters: Kevin Gilliam; Calvin Broadus; Tyrese Gibson; Olan Thompson
- Producer: Battlecat

Snoop Dogg singles chronology
"Lay Low" (2001)	"Just a Baby Boy" (2001)	"Do U Wanna Roll (Dolittle Theme)" (2001)

Tyrese singles chronology
"What Am I Gonna Do" (2001)	"Just a Baby Boy" (2001)	"How You Gonna Act Like That" (2002)

Music video
- "Just a Baby Boy" on YouTube

"Just a Baby Boy" is a song by American rapper Snoop Dogg featuring guest vocals from American R&B singer Tyrese and fellow American rapper Mr. Tan, taken from the soundtrack Baby Boy. The song was written by Snoop Dogg, Tyrese and Kevin "DJ Battlecat" Gilliam, who also handled production. The song was also included in the second Tyrese studio album, 2000 Watts.

== Music video ==
The video features Snoop Dogg, Tyrese and Mr. Tan, along with actresses from the film Baby Boy.

== Track listing ==
- CD single
1. "Just a Baby Boy" (Radio Edit) (with Tyrese featuring Mr. Tan) — 4:00
2. "Just a Baby Boy" (Instrumental) — 4:16
3. "Just a Baby Boy" (Call-Out Hook) (with Tyrese featuring Mr. Tan) — 0:24
4. "Just a Baby Boy" (Hip-Hop Mix) (Radio Edit) (with Tyrese featuring Mr. Tan) — 4:00

== Charts ==
Chart (2001)	Peak position
US Billboard Hot 100	90
US Hot R&B/Hip-Hop Songs (Billboard)	40
US Hot R&B/Hip-Hop Airplay (Billboard)	38
US Rhythmic Airplay (Billboard)	34
