= Alter Ego (Tyrese album) =

Studio album by Tyrese
- Released: December 12, 2006
- Recorded: 2005–06
- Genres: R&B; hip hop; pop
- Length: 40:20 (disc 1: Tyrese); 42:54 (disc 2: Black-Ty)
- Label: J
- Producers: Tyrese (exec.); Wali Ali; Allstar; Bryan-Michael Cox; Dali; Eric Dawkins; Antonio Dixon; Diverse; Mannie Fresh; GX; Jellyroll; Lil Jon; R. Kelly; Jonathan Lighty; J. Que; Siege; Tricky Stewart; Scott Storch; Dewayne Swan; Tank; The Underdogs

Tyrese chronology
I Wanna Go There (2002)	Alter Ego (2006)	Open Invitation (2011)

Singles from Alter Ego
- 1. "One" Released: September 26, 2006; 2. "Turn Ya Out" Released: October 17, 2006; 3. "Hurry Up" Released: February 2, 2007; 4. "Come Back to Me Shawty" Released: February 16, 2007; 5. "Gotta Get You" Released: March 13, 2007

Professional ratings
Review scores
Source	Rating
About.com	3/5 stars
AllMusic	1.5/5 stars
USA Today	3/4 stars

Alter Ego is the fourth studio album by American recording artist and actor Tyrese. It was released on December 12, 2006 through J Records. The album was formatted as a double album. The production on the album was handled by multiple producers including Mannie Fresh, Lil Jon, Scott Storch, R. Kelly, Tricky Stewart and Bryan-Michael Cox among others. The album also features guest appearances by The Game, Method Man, Snoop Dogg, Too Short, Kurupt, Lil Scrappy, David Banner, R. Kelly, Lil Jon, and Mannie Fresh.

Alter Ego was supported by two singles: "One" and "Turn Ya Out". The album received generally mixed reviews from music critics and received small commercial success. It debuted at number 23 on the US Billboard 200 and number four on the US Top R&B/Hip-Hop Albums chart, selling 116,000 copies in its first week.

== Music and development ==
The album was formatted as a double album, intending to market Tyrese's contrasting facets of artistry. The first disc Tyrese contains slow and midtempo pop and R&B songs, while the second, Black-Ty (named after his on-stage rapper alter ego), focuses on hip hop and uptempo beats.

== Singles ==
The album released two singles, which both of them ultimately missed the US Billboard Hot 100 chart. The album first single "One" peaked at number 23 on the US Hot R&B/Hip-Hop Songs chart dated February 17, 2007. The second single "Turn Ya Out" peaked at number 70 on the chart dated February 3, 2007.

== Commercial performance ==
Alter Ego debuted at number 23 on the US Billboard 200 chart, selling 116,000 copies in its first week. This became Tyrese's lowest charting-album to date. The album also debuted at number four on the US Top R&B/Hip-Hop Albums chart, becoming Tyrese's fourth top-ten album on this chart.

== Track listing ==
Disc 1: Tyrese
No.	Title	Writer(s)	Producer(s)	Length
1.	"One"	Harvey Mason, Jr.; Damon Thomas; Steve Russell; Antonio Dixon; Erik Griggs	The Underdogs	3:43
2.	"Lights On"	Christopher Stewart; J. Que; Sam Salter	Tricky Stewart; J. Que; The Underdogs (voc.)	4:08
3.	"Turn Ya Out" (featuring Lil Jon)	Jonathan Smith; Johntá Austin; Craig Love; Lamarquis Jefferson	Lil Jon; The Underdogs (voc.)	3:44
4.	"Come Back to Me Shawty"	Mason, Jr.; Thomas	The Underdogs	3:25
5.	"Better to Know"	Mason, Jr.; Thomas; Durrell "Tank" Babbs	The Underdogs; Tank (co.)	3:56
6.	"Gotta Get You"	Bryan-Michael Cox; Austin; Kendrick Dean	Bryan-Michael Cox; Wyldcard	4:27
7.	"Morning After"	Eric Dawkins; Dixon; Dewayne Swan	Antonio Dixon; Eric Dawkins; Dewayne Swan (co.)	4:45
8.	"Hurry Up"	Robert Kelly	R. Kelly; The Underdogs (voc.)	3:48
9.	"Signs of Love Makin' (Part II)" (featuring R. Kelly)	Tyrese Gibson; Mason, Jr.; Thomas; Kelly	R. Kelly; The Underdogs (co.)	3:55
10.	"Better Than Sex"	Dawkins; Dixon	Dixon; Dawkins	4:25
Total length:				40:20

Disc 2: Black-Ty
No.	Title	Writer(s)	Producer(s)	Length
1.	"Intro"	Gibson		0:38
2.	"I Salute"	Gibson; Allen Gordon; Joel Campbell	Allstar	1:04
3.	"Roses"	Gibson; Marcus White; Curtis Mayfield	Siege	3:56
4.	"Get It In" (featuring Method Man)	Gibson; Scott Storch; Clifford Smith	Scott Storch	3:25
5.	"Get Low" (featuring Too Short, Snoop Dogg & Kurupt)	Gibson; Todd Shaw; Calvin Broadus; Ricardo Brown; White	Siege	4:04
6.	"U Scared" (featuring David Banner & Lil Scrappy)	Gibson; David Banner; Raynard Richardson; William Cooper; Ice Cube; Broadus; J. Smith	Wali Ali	3:45
7.	"What It Is" (featuring Mannie Fresh)	Gibson; Byron Thomas	Mannie Fresh	3:55
8.	"Roll the Dice" (featuring Snoop Dogg & Kurupt)	Gibson; Broadus; Brown	Dali	3:48
9.	"Ghetto Dayz" (featuring The Game & Kurupt)	Gibson; Jayceon Taylor; Brown; David Drew; Erick Coomes; Chris De La Fuente	Jellyroll; Dali	6:03
10.	"Fly Away" (featuring Kurupt)	Gibson; Jared McCraw; Brown; Leon Huff; Kenneth Gamble	Diverse	4:00
11.	"Broke Ass Niggas"	Gibson; Jonathan Lighty	Jonathan Lighty	2:55
12.	"Alter Ego (Outro)"	Gibson; David Kirkwood	GX	4:57
Total length:				42:54

Samples

- "Roses" contains a sample from "The Makings of You", written by Curtis Mayfield.
- "U Scared" contains a portion of the composition "Go to Church", written by Ice Cube, Calvin Broadus, and Jonathan Smith.
- "Fly Away" contains a sample from "Come Go with Me", written by Leon Huff and Kenneth Gamble.

== Charts ==
=== Weekly charts ===
Chart (2006)	Peak position
US Billboard 200	23
US Top R&B/Hip-Hop Albums (Billboard)	4

=== Year-end charts ===
Chart (2007)	Position
US Billboard 200	156
US Top R&B/Hip-Hop Albums (Billboard)	32
