= Tyrese Gibson =

American singer and actor (born 1978)

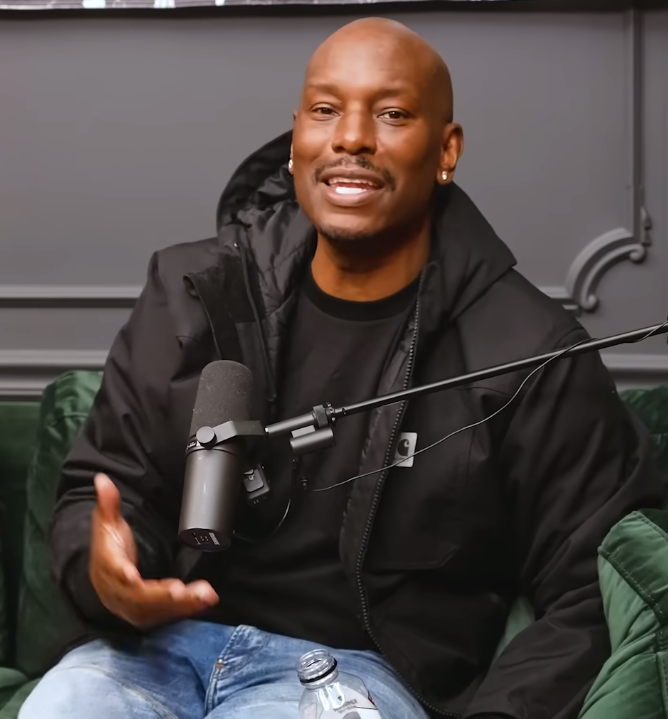
- Gibson in 2024
- Born: Tyrese Darnell Gibson; December 30, 1978 (age 47); Los Angeles, California, U.S.
- Other names: Black-Ty; Tyrese; Romey Rome
- Occupations: Singer; actor
- Years active: 1994–present
- Spouses: Norma Mitchell (m. 2007; div. 2009) Samantha Lee Gibson (m. 2017; div. 2022)
- Children: 2
- Musical career
- Genre: R&B
- Instrument: Vocals
- Labels: Voltron; Caroline; RCA; J; EMI
- Member of: TGT
- Website: tyrese.tv

Tyrese Darnell Gibson (born December 30, 1978) is an American R&B singer and actor from Los Angeles, California. He signed with RCA Records in 1998, and released his debut single "Nobody Else" in August of that year. It peaked within the top 40 of the Billboard Hot 100 and preceded his self-titled debut album (1998), which received platinum certification by the Recording Industry Association of America (RIAA) and spawned his second top 40 single, "Sweet Lady".

His second and third albums, 2000 Watts (2001) and I Wanna Go There (2002), both received gold certifications by the RIAA. The latter was led by the single "How You Gonna Act Like That", which peaked at number seven on the Billboard Hot 100 and remains his highest-charting song. His fourth album, Alter Ego (2006), explored hip hop under the pseudonym Black Ty, while his fifth album, Open Invitation (2011) received a nomination for Best R&B Album at the 55th Annual Grammy Awards. Gibson's sixth album, Black Rose (2015), debuted atop the Billboard 200.

Gibson has sold over 4 million singles and albums in the United States, and has been nominated for six Grammy Awards. Gibson had his first starring role in John Singleton's coming-of-age hood film Baby Boy (2001), and gained widespread recognition as Roman Pearce in seven films of the Fast & Furious franchise (2003–present) and Robert Epps in the first three films of the Transformers franchise (2007–2011). Gibson reunited with Singleton for the action film Four Brothers (2005). He appeared in the comedy film Ride Along 2 (2016) and the superhero film Morbius (2022).

== Early life ==
Gibson was born and raised in Watts, Los Angeles, California. His mother, Priscilla Murray Gibson (née Durham), raised him and his three older siblings as a single parent after his father, Tyrone Gibson, left. While growing up in Watts on 113th Street during the late 1980s, Gibson was exposed to gangs, with some of his childhood friends becoming members of the Crips. In his autobiography, Tyrese stated it was an older gangster named "Dirtbike Fred" that encouraged him to take a different path. He later graduated from Locke High School in 1996.

== Music career ==
=== Beginnings ===
Gibson's career began when he auditioned for a Coca-Cola commercial at the suggestion of his high school music teacher. An appearance in a 1994 Coca-Cola advertisement, singing the phrase "Always Coca-Cola", led to bigger fame. It also led him to other appearances, such as for Guess and Tommy Hilfiger.

=== 1998–1999: Tyrese ===
Gibson was signed as an artist to RCA Records in 1998, releasing his debut single "Nobody Else". It quickly rose on the Billboard Hot 100 chart, peaking at No. 36. On September 29, 1998, he released his self-titled album Tyrese at the age of 19. It debuted on the Billboard charts at No. 17. In late 1998, Gibson became the new host of the weekday music video show MTV Jams on MTV and a host and VJ for the channel. Afterwards, he released the second and highest-charting single "Sweet Lady" which became the album's biggest hit, reaching No. 9 on the R&B charts. The single earned Gibson a Grammy nomination for Best R&B Male Vocal Performance. Afterwards, he released the third single from the album "Lately". It made it to No. 56 on the Billboard charts. The album eventually went on to be certified Platinum. Gibson, along with singers Ginuwine, RL of Next, and Case, were featured on the soundtrack of The Best Man on the single "The Best Man I Can Be".

=== 2000–2001: 2000 Watts ===
On May 22, 2001, Gibson released his second studio album 2000 Watts. The first single off the album was "I Like Them Girls", which reached No. 15 on the Billboard Hot R&B/Hip-Hop Songs chart. The album went on to be certified Gold, selling over 500,000 copies. The third single off the album, "Just a Baby Boy", with Snoop Dogg and Mr. Tan, was featured on the soundtrack to the film Baby Boy, Gibson's first major acting role.

=== 2002–2004: I Wanna Go There ===
After RCA Records was disbanded, Gibson went on to sign to J Records, where he released his third studio album I Wanna Go There on December 10, 2002. His first single from the album and his most successful single to date "How You Gonna Act Like That" debuted on the Hot R&B/Hip-Hop Songs chart at No. 7.

=== 2005–2010: Alter Ego and hiatus ===
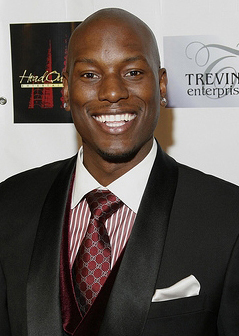
Gibson in 2008

On December 12, 2006, Gibson released his fourth studio album, Alter Ego, his first double-disc album. It was also the first album in which he showcased his rapping persona. The first single off the album was "One" debuting on the Hot R&B/Hip-Hop Songs chart at No. 26. The album itself is considered Gibson's lowest selling album to date. In 2007, Gibson, Ginuwine, and Tank founded TGT.

=== 2011–2012: Open Invitation ===
After taking time from music to focus on his family and acting career, Gibson returned to music in 2011, when he signed himself to EMI and released his fifth studio album Open Invitation on November 1. The album debuted on the US Billboard 200 albums chart at No. 9, sold 130,000 copies in its first week and has gone on to sell over 400,000 copies. It was preceded by the lead single "Stay" and peaked on the US Hot R&B/Hip-Hop Songs chart at No. 11. The second single "Too Easy" featured fellow actor, friend and rapper Ludacris. It peaked on the US Hot R&B/Hip-Hop Songs chart at No. 38. The third single "Nothing On You" peaked on the US Hot R&B/Hip-Hop Songs chart at No. 61. In 2013, the album earned Gibson his third Grammy nomination at the 2013 Grammy Awards for Best R&B Album.

=== 2013–2017: TGT and Black Rose ===
In early 2013, it was announced and confirmed after much speculation that Gibson, Ginuwine, and Tank would be releasing their debut collaboration album, to be distributed by Atlantic Records. In 2014, Gibson released the album Black Rose. A double album set was released in 2015. On July 10, 2015, Black Rose was released and debuted at No. 1 on the Billboard 200, with first-week sales of 77,000 copies, making it Gibson's first number one album of his career. It received positive reviews. However, his Fast & Furious co-star Dwayne "The Rock" Johnson called it "the biggest piece of dogshit that I've ever heard".

=== 2017–present: Beautiful Pain ===
In October 2017, Gibson announced he was working on a project titled Identity Theft and returning to his alter-ego Black Ty. Identity Theft was supposed to focus more on his hip-hop roots, with Gibson predicting that it would "change hip-hop." The project however was shelved and retooled into an R&B album titled Beautiful Pain, rumored to be released in late 2023. A single titled "Don't Think You Ever Loved", which features Lenny Kravitz and background vocals by Le'Andria Johnson, was released in February 2023. A remix of the song (featuring 2 Chainz and Jeezy) leaked on YouTube later that month. "Love Transaction", a second single from the album, was released on August 25, 2023. When Gibson competed on season five of The Masked Singer, interim host Niecy Nash introduced his character as "Porcupine" only for Gibson to tell her that his character preferred to be called "Robopine".

== Acting career ==
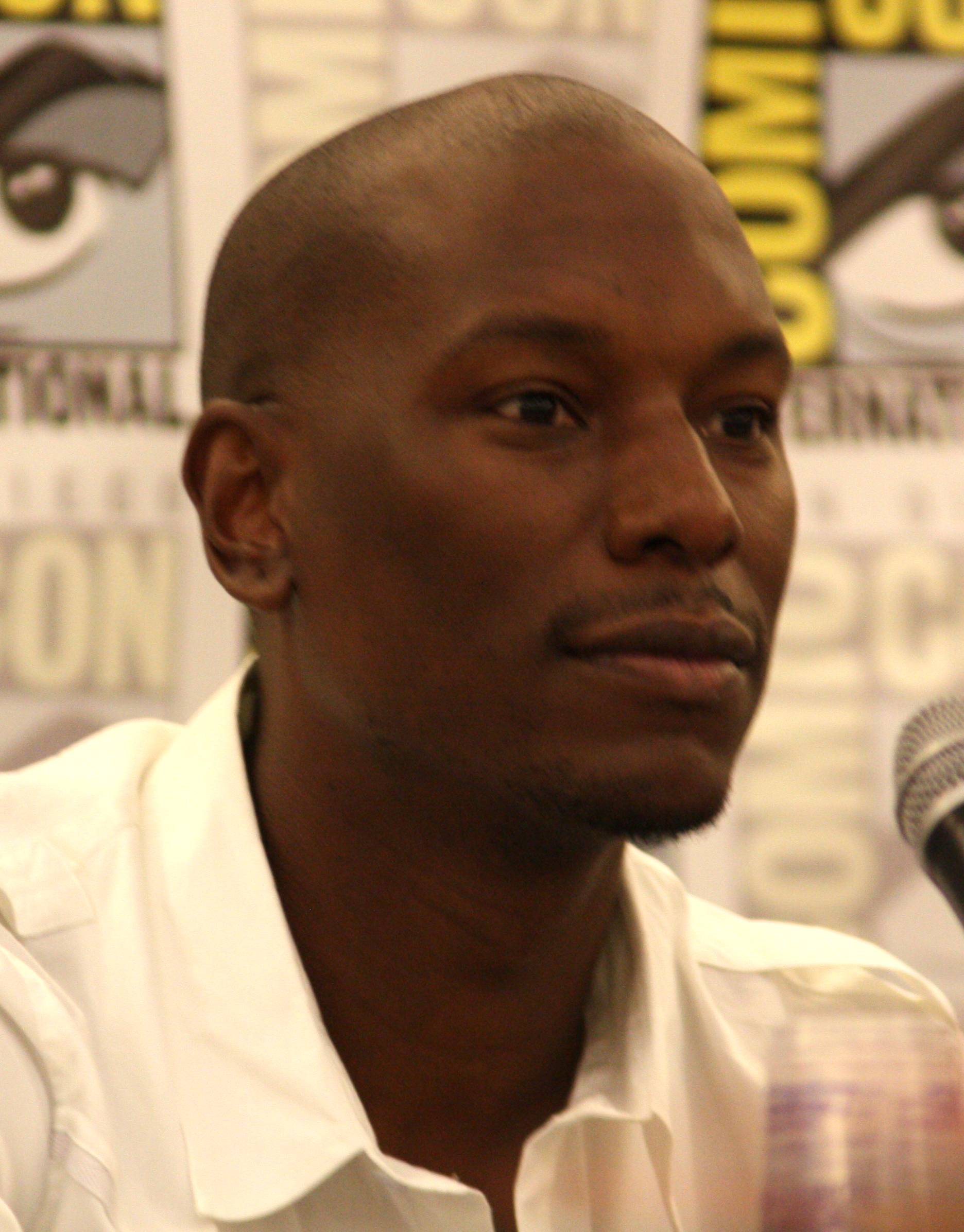
Gibson in 2009 at San Diego Comic-Con

Gibson has a recurring role in two of the highest-grossing film series: Fast & Furious and Transformers. His first film role was in John Singleton's Baby Boy in 2001.

=== Fast & Furious ===
Gibson plays Roman Pearce in the Fast & Furious film series. He first played Pearce alongside his best friend, Paul Walker, in 2003's 2 Fast 2 Furious, his second collaboration with Singleton. He returned as Roman Pearce in Fast Five (2011), Fast & Furious 6 (2013), Furious 7 (2015), The Fate of the Furious (2017), F9 (2021) and Fast X (2023).

=== Transformers ===
Gibson portrays Sergeant Robert Epps in the Transformers film series. In 2007, with the cast of Josh Duhamel, John Turturro, Megan Fox, Anthony Anderson and Jon Voight, with star Shia LaBeouf, Transformers went on to make nearly $710 million worldwide. It was directed and co-produced by Michael Bay. Steven Spielberg served as the executive producer. Gibson reprised his role in the sequels Transformers: Revenge of the Fallen (2009) and Transformers: Dark of the Moon (2011). Gibson was supposed to return as Epps in Transformers: The Last Knight (2017), but was unable to appear due to scheduling conflicts with The Fate of the Furious.

=== Other films ===
In 2005, Singleton and Gibson collaborated for the third time when Gibson co-starred in the action-crime drama Four Brothers alongside Mark Wahlberg.

Gibson went on to star in the action-drama Waist Deep with Meagan Good.

In 2008, he co-starred opposite Jason Statham in Death Race.

In March 2019, Gibson joined Jared Leto in Sony's Spider-Man spinoff Morbius.

== Writing ==
In 2009, Gibson co-created a three-issue comic book titled Tyrese Gibson's MAYHEM! after being inspired from his visit to Comic Con.

On May 8, 2012, Gibson released his first book, titled How to Get Out of Your Own Way. It went on to be a New York Times bestseller. On February 5, 2013, Gibson co-authored his second book along with close personal friend Rev. Run titled Manology: Secrets of Your Man's Mind Revealed, which also went on to be a New York Times best seller.

== Personal life ==
Gibson is a Christian. He was married to Norma Mitchell from 2007 to 2009, and the couple had one child, a daughter, born in 2007.

In January 2017, Gibson purchased a $4 million home in Atlanta, Georgia. He married Samantha Lee on February 14, 2017. Their daughter was born on October 1, 2018. In December 2020, Gibson and Lee announced they were divorcing. In 2022, the pair were declared legally single. Gibson began dating his girlfriend Zelie Timothy in 2021, and stated he plans to marry her when his divorce from Lee is finalized.

=== Legal issues ===
On September 9, 2024, Gibson was arrested following an appearance in Fulton County Court where he was issued a contempt charge after it was found that he was failing to pay child support to Lee. Gibson was ordered to remain in custody until he paid Lee $73,500. Gibson was released after paying the child support. He plans to appeal the contempt order.

On October 1, 2025, it was revealed that an arrest warrant had been issued for Gibson since September 22, 2025 on cruelty to animals charge. The arrest warrant stemmed from an incident on September 18, 2025 which involved his four cane corso dogs killing a neighbor's dog after these dogs were able to run wild throughout his Atlanta neighborhood. In addition, Fulton County police captain Nicole Dwyer publicly acknowledged that there had in fact been multiple calls from neighborhood residences about incidents which involved these four attack dogs after they continuously roamed unsupervised in the neighborhood in the past few months leading up to the incident where they killed Gibson's neighbor's small spaniel dog. The neighbor whose spaniel was killed was also acknowledged to be living a half-a-mile away from Gibson. On October 3, 2025, Gibson was arrested after he turned himself in to the custody of the local police, was booked on a cruelty to animals charge, and then released after paying a $20,000 bond.

== Discography ==
Solo albums

- Tyrese (1998)
- 2000 Watts (2001)
- I Wanna Go There (2002)
- Alter Ego (2006)
- Open Invitation (2011)
- Black Rose (2015)
- Beautiful Pain (2024; reissued in 2025 as Painfully Beautiful)

Collaborative albums

- Three Kings (with TGT) (2013)

== Filmography ==
=== Film ===
Year	Title	Role	Note
2000	Love Song	Skip/Mad Rage	TV movie
2001	Baby Boy	Joseph 'Jody' Summers	
2003	2 Fast 2 Furious	Roman Pearce	Credited as Tyrese
2004	Flight of the Phoenix	AJ	
2005	Four Brothers	Angel Mercer	
2005	Annapolis	Matt Cole	
2006	Waist Deep	Otis/O2	
2007	Transformers	Robert Epps	
2007	The Take	Adell Baldwin	
2008	Death Race	Joseph "Machine Gun Joe" Mason	
2009	Transformers: Revenge of the Fallen	Robert Epps	
2010	Legion	Kyle Williams	
2011	Transformers: Dark of the Moon	Robert Epps	
2011	Fast Five	Roman Pearce	
2012	Eldorado	David	
2013	Fast & Furious 6	Roman Pearce	
2013	Black Nativity	Tyson	
2015	Furious 7	Roman Pearce	
2015	Hollywood Adventures	Himself	Cameo
2016	Ride Along 2	Mayfield	
2017	The Fate of the Furious	Roman Pearce	
2019	Black and Blue	Milo "Mouse" Jackson	
2020	The Christmas Chronicles 2	Bob Booker	
2021	F9	Roman Pearce	
2021	Rogue Hostage	Kyle Snowden	
2021	Dangerous	Sheriff McCoy	
2022	Morbius	Simon Stroud	
2022	The System	Terry Savage	
2023	Fast X	Roman Pearce	
2023	The Collective	Hugo	
2023	Squealer	Officer Paul	
2023	Helen's Dead	Henry	
2024	Bosco	Tootie	
2024	Bloodline Killer	Detective Cyphers	
2024	1992	Mercer	
2024	Fluxx	Calvin Campbell	
2025	Hollywood Grit	Darnell Johnson	
2025	The Wrecker	Detective Boswell	
2026	Oscar Shaw	Ray Jay	
2026	Holiguards Saga — The Portal of Force	Brute	
2026	Vampires of the Velvet Lounge	Luke	
2026	Kill Code	Lukas	

Key
†	Denotes films that have not yet been released

=== Television ===
Year	Title	Role	Notes
1996	Hangin' with Mr. Cooper	Darrell	Episode: "Talent Show"
1997	Martin	Dante	Episode: "Goin' for Mine"
1998	BET Soundstage	Himself	Episode: "Episode #1.3"
1998	The Parent 'Hood	Coop	Episode: "Hood Sweet' Hood: Part 1"
1998	Sister, Sister	Himself	Episode: "The Domino Effect"
1998-2007	It's Showtime at the Apollo	Himself	Recurring Guest
1999	Flava	Himself	Episode: "Episode #4.7"
1999	Andi Meets...	Himself	Episode: "Britney Spears"
1999	ABC TGIF	Himself	Episode: "TGIF First Look: Walt Disney World Summer Jam Concert"
1999	Blue's Clues	Himself	Episode: "Blue's Big Holiday"
2000	Making the Video	Himself	Episode: "Da Brat: What'Chu Like"
2000	Hollywood Squares	Himself	Recurring Guest
2000	Moesha	Troy	Episode: "The Player"
2001	The Andy Dick Show	Himself	Episode: "Come Back Quentin"
2001	Who Wants to Be a Millionaire?	Himself	Episode: "Top of the Charts Edition, Show 2-4"
2001-03	Soul Train	Himself	Recurring Guest
2002	All That	Himself	Episode: "Christina Vidal/Tyrese"
2003	Star Search	Himself/Guest Judge	Episode: "The One with 2 Fast 2 Furious Star Tyrese Gibson"
2003	Soul Train Lady of Soul Awards	Himself/Co-Host	
2003	Half & Half	Himself	Episode: "The Big Sexy Shame Episode"
2005	Punk'd	Himself	Episode: "Episode #5.2"
2006	Soul Train Music Awards	Himself/Co-Host	
2010	Unsung	Himself	Episode: "Teddy Pendergrass"
2010	La La's Full Court Wedding	Himself	Episode: "It's Finally Here!" & "Clip Show"
2012	Andrew Young Presents	Himself	Episode: "Memphis: Facing the Cross"
2012	The Soup	Himself	Episode: "Episode #9.5"
2015	Unsung Hollywood	Himself	Episode: "Baby Boy"
2015	Being	Himself	Episode: "Tyrese Gibson"
2015	Lip Sync Battle	Himself	Episode: "Holiday Special"
2016	It's Not You, It's Men	Himself/Co-Host	
2016	K. Michelle: My Life	Himself	Episode: "See You Tamara"
2016	American Dad!	Himself (voice)	Episode: "The Devil Wears a Lapel Pin"
2017	Star	Pastor Bobby Harris	Recurring Cast: Season 1
2018	I Am Paul Walker	Himself	Documentary film
2020	Uncensored	Himself	Episode: "Tyrese"
2021	The Masked Singer	Robopine	Season 5 contestant
2021	Architectural Digest	Himself	Episode: "Inside Tyrese Gibson's Atlanta Dream Mansion"
2023	Top Chef	Himself	Episode: "Street Food Fight"

=== Other media ===
Music videos
Year	Artist	Title
1997	SWV	"Rain"
1998	Usher	"My Way"
1999	Monica	"Angel of Mine"
2000	Da Brat	"What'chu Like"
2003	Roselyn Sánchez	"Amor Amor"
2003	R. Kelly featuring Big Tigger and Cam'ron	"Snake (Remix)"
2003	Ludacris	"Act a Fool"
2005	Keyshia Cole	"Love"
2006	Omarion	"Entourage"
2006	Chingy	"Pullin' Me Back"
2008	Akon featuring Colby O'Donis and Kardinal Offishall	"Beautiful"
2009	Chris Brown featuring Lil Wayne and Swizz Beatz	"I Can Transform Ya"
2010	Lady Gaga featuring Beyoncé	"Telephone"
2013	Clinton Sparks featuring 2 Chainz and Macklemore	"Gold Rush"
2013	T-Pain featuring B.o.B	"Up Down (Do This All Day)"
2015	Eric Bellinger featuring 2 Chainz	"Focused On You"
2015	Wiz Khalifa featuring Charlie Puth	"See You Again"

Other appearances
Year	Title	Role	Notes
Video games
2020	Fast & Furious Crossroads	Roman Pearce (voice)	
Theme park ride
2015	Fast & Furious: Supercharged	Roman Pearce	

== Awards and nominations ==
American Music Awards

Year	Nominee / work	Award	Result
2000	Tyrese Gibson	Favorite New R&B/Soul Artist	Won

Black Movie Awards

Year	Nominee / work	Award	Result
2006	Waist Deep	Outstanding Performance by an Actor in a Leading Role	Nominated

Black Reel Awards

Year	Nominee / work	Award	Result
2002	"Just a Baby Boy" (with Mr. Tan and Snoop Dogg)	Best Song	Nominated
2002	Baby Boy	Best Actor	Nominated
2006	Four Brothers	Best Ensemble	Nominated

Grammy Awards

Year	Nominee / work	Award	Result
2000	"Sweet Lady"	Best R&B Male Vocal Performance	Nominated
2004	"How U Gonna Act Like That"	Best R&B Male Vocal Performance	Nominated
2013	Open Invitation	Best R&B Album	Nominated
2014	Three Kings with Ginuwine and Tank as TGT	Best R&B Album	Nominated
2016	"Shame"	Best Traditional R&B Performance	Nominated
2016	"Shame"	Best R&B Song	Nominated

NAACP Image Awards

Year	Nominee / work	Award	Result
2002	2000 Watts	Outstanding Hip-Hop Artist	Nominated
2002	Baby Boy	Outstanding Actor in a Motion Picture	Nominated
2002	The Tonight Show with Jay Leno	Outstanding Performance in a Variety Show	Nominated
2012	Trumpet Awards	Pinnacle Award	Won

Locarno International Film Festival

Year	Nominee / work	Award	Result
2001	Baby Boy for 'its innovative concept and ensemble acting'	Special Mention Award	

Soul Train Music Awards

Year	Nominee / work	Award	Result
2013	"TGT" with Ginuwine and Tank	New Artist of the Year	Nominated
2012	"Stay"	Song of the Year	Won
