= Derrick (name) =

Derrick is both a masculine given name and a surname. It is a variant of Theodoric. People with the name include:

== People with the given name "Derrick" include ==
Pending a change, click on Z to find the surname.

=== A ===
- Derrick Abu (born 2003), German footballer
- Derrick Adams (born 1970), American visual artist
- Derrick Adkins (born 1970), American Olympic hurdler
- Derrick Alexander (disambiguation), multiple people
- Derrick Allen (born 1980), American basketball player and coach
- Derrick Alston (born 1972), American basketball player
- Derrick Alston Jr. (born 1997), American basketball player
- Derrick America, South African politician
- Derrick Anderson (field hockey) (born 1936), Canadian field hockey player
- Derrick Ansley (born 1981), American football coach
- Derrick Appiah (born 1994), Italian rugby union footballer
- Derrick Ashihundu (born 1998), Kenyan rugby union footballer
- Derrick Ashong (born 1975), Ghanaian producer and musician
- Derrick Atta Agyei (born 2003), Ghanaian footballer
- Derrick Atkins (born 1984), Bahamian sprinter
- Derrick Atterberry (born 1972), American football player

=== B ===
- Derrick Bailey (1918–2009), British pilot
- Derrick Sherwin Bailey (1910–1984), English theologian
- Derrick Barnes (disambiguation), multiple people
- Derrick Barry (born 1983), American drag performer
- Derrick Barton (1923–2006), British tennis player
- Derrick Baskin (born 1975), American actor
- Derrick Baxby (1940–2017), British microbiologist
- Derrick Beckles, Canadian writer and actor
- Derrick Bell (1930–2011), American lawyer and civil rights activist
- Derrick Bishop (born 1983), Barbadian cricketer
- Derrick Blaylock (born 1979), American football player
- Derrick Borte (born 1967), German-American filmmaker
- Derrick Bostrom (born 1960), American musician
- Derrick Bragg, Canadian politician
- Derrick Branche (born 1947), British actor
- Derrick Brangman (born 1987), Bermudian cricketer
- Derrick Drop Braxton (born 1981), American record producer
- Derrick Brew (born 1977), American track athlete
- Derrick Brooks (born 1973), American football player
- Derrick Brown (disambiguation), multiple people
- Derrick Bryant (born 1974), American basketball player
- Derrick Burgess (born 1978), American football player
- Derrick Burgess (politician), Bermudian politician
- Derrick Burroughs (born 1962), American football player and coach
- Derrick Byars (born 1984), American basketball player

=== C ===
- Derrick Cameron, American comedian
- Derrick Campbell (born 1972), Canadian speed skater
- Derrick Capper (1912–1977), English police officer
- Derrick Caracter (born 1988), American basketball player
- Derrick Carter (born 1969), American record producer and musician
- Derrick Carter (footballer) (born 1982), Guyanese footballer
- Derrick Cawthorne (born 1931), British fencer
- Derrick H.M. Chan (born 1955), American judge
- Derrick Chievous (born 1967), American basketball player
- Derrick Childs (1918–1987), Welsh bishop
- Derrick Christie (born 1957), English footballer
- Derrick Clark (disambiguation), multiple people
- Derrick Coleman (born 1967), American basketball player
- Derrick Coleman (American football) (born 1990), American football player
- Derrick Cooper (born 1955), English golfer
- Derrick Crass (born 1960), American weightlifter
- Derrick Crawford (disambiguation), multiple people
- Derrick Crudup (born 1965), American football player
- Derrick Cullors (born 1972), American football player
- Derrick Curtis, American politician

=== D ===
- Derrick Dalley (born 1965), Canadian politician
- Derrick Davenport (born 1978), American model
- Derrick Deese (born 1970), American football player
- Derrick Deese Jr. (born 1998), American football player
- Derrick de Kerckhove (born 1944), Canadian professor
- Derrick Delmore (born 1978), American figure skater
- Derrick De Marney (1906–1978), English actor
- Derrick Dial (born 1975), American basketball player
- Derrick Dillon (born 1995), American football player
- Derrick Dockery (born 1980), American football player
- Derrick Dodd, American writer
- Derrick Doggett (born 1984), American football player
- Derrick Douglas (born 1968), American football player
- Derrick Dowell (born 1965), American basketball player
- Derrick Downing (born 1945), English footballer
- Derrick Dukes (born 1965), American professional wrestler

=== E ===
- Derrick Edwards (born 1968), Antiguan footballer
- Derrick Etienne (born 1996), Haitian-American footballer
- Derrick Etienne (footballer, born 1974) (born 1974), Haitian footballer
- Derrick Evans (disambiguation), multiple people

=== F ===
- Derrick Faison (1967–2004), American football player
- Derrick Favors (born 1991), American basketball player
- Derrick Fenner (born 1967), American football player
- Derrick Fletcher (born 1975), American football player
- Derrick Flint (1924–2018), English cricketer
- Derrick Florence (born 1968), American sprinter
- Derrick Ford (born 1979), American football player
- Derrick Frazier (born 1970), American football player
- Derrick Frost (born 1980), American football player
- Derrick Fung (born 1987), Canadian entrepreneur and foreign exchange trader

=== G ===
- Derrick Gaffney (born 1955), American football player
- Derrick Gainer (born 1972), American boxer
- Derrick Gainer (American football) (born 1966), American football player
- Derrick Gardner (born 1965), American jazz trumpeter
- Derrick Gardner (American football) (born 1977), American football player
- Derrick Gervin (born 1963), American basketball player
- Derrick Gibson (disambiguation), multiple people
- Derrick Goh (born 1968), Singaporean politician
- Derrick Goodwin (1935–2022), English theatre and television director
- Derrick Goold (born 1975), American author and sportswriter
- Derrick Gordon (born 1991), American basketball player
- Derrick Gore (born 1994), American football player
- Derrick Gosselin (born 1956), Belgian engineer and economist
- Derrick Gragg (born 1969), American college athletics administrator
- Derrick Graham (disambiguation), multiple people
- Derrick Grant (1938–2024), Scottish rugby union footballer
- Derrick Gray (born 1985), American football player
- Derrick Green (born 1971), American musician
- Derrick Green (American football) (born 1994), American football player
- Derrick Gregory (1949–1989), English drug smuggler
- Derrick Griffin (born 1993), American basketball player
- Derrick Gunston (1891–1985), British politician

=== H ===
- Derrick Hall (born 1969), American sports executive
- Derrick Hall (cricketer) (1892–1947), Irish cricketer
- Derrick Ham (born 1975), American football player
- Derrick Hamilton (born 1981), American football player
- Derrick Hamilton (basketball) (born 1966), American basketball player
- Derrick Harden (born 1964), American football player
- Derrick Harmon (born 1963), American football player
- Derrick Harriott (born 1939), Jamaican singer and record producer
- Derrick Harris (disambiguation), multiple people
- Derrick Harrison (1929–1967), English rugby league footballer
- Derrick Harvey (born 1986), American football player
- Derrick Helton (born 1985), American Paralympic rugby footballer
- Derrick Henry (born 1994), American football player
- Derrick Hicks, American activist
- Derrick Hodge (born 1979), American composer and musician
- Derrick Hoh (born 1985), Singaporean singer-songwriter
- Derrick Hoskins (born 1970), American football player
- Derrick Hyman, South African Paralympian

=== J ===
- Derrick Z. Jackson (born 1955), African-American journalist
- Derrick Jackson (politician) (born 1966), American politician
- Derrick James (born 1972), American boxer
- Derrick Jasper (born 1988), American basketball player
- Derrick Jefferson (born 1968), American boxer
- Derrick Jensen (activist) (born 1960), American author and environmental activist
- Derrick Jensen (American football) (1956–2017), American football player
- Derrick Johnson (disambiguation), multiple people
- Derrick Jones (disambiguation), multiple people

=== K ===
- Derrick Kabwe (born 1983), Zambian footballer
- Derrick Kakooza (born 2002), Ugandan footballer
- Derrick Kellier (born 1947), Jamaican businessman and politician
- Derrick Kelly II (born 1995), American football player
- Derrick Kennedy (1904–1976), Irish cricketer
- Derrick Kent, British naval officer
- Derrick Kimball (born 1954), Canadian lawyer
- Derrick Kindred (born 1993), American football player
- Derrick Kitts (born 1973), American politician
- Derrick Knowles (born 1966), Bahamian hurdler
- Derrick Köhn (born 1999), German footballer
- Derrick Krantz (born 1988), American professional mixed martial artist

=== L ===
- Derrick Lancaster (born 1973), American stock car racing driver
- Derrick Lassic (born 1970), American football player
- Derrick Lee (disambiguation), multiple people
- Derrick Lehmer (disambiguation), multiple people
- Derrick Lente, American politician
- Derrick Leon (1908–1944), British author
- Derek K C Leung (born 1988), horse racing jockey
- Derrick Levasseur (born 1984), American television personality
- Derrick Lewis (disambiguation), multiple people
- Derrick Locke (born 1989), American football player
- Derrick Lonsdale (1924–2024), British-born American pediatrician and researcher
- Derrick Lott (born 1990), American football player
- Derrick Low (born 1986), American basketball player
- Derrick Luckassen (born 1995), Dutch footballer
- Derrick Lythgoe (1933–2012), English footballer

=== M ===
- Derrick Somerset Macnutt (1902–1971), British crossword compiler
- Derrick Marks (born 1993), American basketball player
- Derrick Martin (born 1985), American football player
- Derrick Mason (born 1974), American football player
- Derrick Mathews (born 1992), American football player
- Derrick May (disambiguation), multiple people
- Derrick Mayes (born 1974), American football player
- Derrick McAdoo (born 1965), American football player
- Derrick McCollum, American politician
- Derrick McDicken (born 1955), Scottish footballer
- Derrick McFall (born 2005), American football player
- Derrick McKey (born 1966), American basketball player
- Derrick McKoy (born 1951), Jamaican politician
- Derrick Mehmen (born 1985), American mixed martial artist
- Derrick Mein (born 1985), American sports shooter
- Derrick Mensah (born 1995), Ghanaian footballer
- Derrick Mercer (born 1986), American basketball player
- Derrick Mgwebi (born 1956), South African military commander
- Derrick Miller, American army officer
- Derrick Mokaleng (born 1997), South African sprinter
- Derrick Monasterio (born 1995), Filipino actor and singer
- Derrick Moncrief (born 1993), American football player
- Derrick Moore (disambiguation), multiple people
- Derrick Morgan (born 1940), Jamaican musician
- Derrick Morgan (American football) (born 1989), American football player
- Derrick Morse (born 1985), American football player
- Derrick Moss (disambiguation), multiple people
- Derrick Murdock (born 1957), American bassist and composer

=== N ===
- Derrick Ndzimande, South African gospel singer
- Derrick Ned (born 1969), American football player
- Derrick Ng (born 1987), Canadian badminton player
- Derrick Niederman (born 1954), American author
- Derrick Nix (basketball) (born 1990), American basketball player
- Derrick Nnadi (born 1996), American football player
- Derrick Nsibambi (born 1994), Ugandan footballer
- Derrick Nugawela, Sri Lankan army officer
- Derrick Nyeko (born 1992), Ugandan politician

=== O ===
- Derrick Obasohan (born 1981), Nigerian-American basketball player
- Derrick O'Connor (1941–2018), Irish theatre and character actor
- Derrick Oden (born 1970), American football player
- Derrick Oduro (born 1958), Ghanaian politician
- Derrick Orone (born 1988), Ugandan politician
- Derrick Osaze (born 1993), British boxer
- Derrick Otanga (born 1996), Kenyan footballer

=== P ===
- Derrick Page (born 1961), Jamaican-English cricketer
- Derrick Palmer (born 1988/1989), American labor activist
- Derrick Parker (born 1957), English footballer
- Derrick Patterson (born 1968), Scottish rugby union footballer
- Derrick Pearson, American sports announcer
- Derrick Pereira (born 1962), Indian footballer
- Derrick Peterson (born 1977), American middle-distance runner
- Derrick Peynado (born 1960), Jamaican sprinter
- Derrick Phelps (born 1972), American basketball player
- Derrick Pierce (born 1974), American pornographic actor
- Derrick Pitts (born 1955), American astronomer
- Derrick Plourde (1971–2005), American punk rock drummer
- Derrick Pope (born 1982), American football player
- Derrick Pouliot (born 1994), Canadian ice hockey player
- Derrick Pumaren, Filipino basketball coach

=== R ===
- Derrick Ramsey (born 1956), American civil servant
- Derrick Ransom (born 1976), American football player
- Derrick Richardson (born 1986), American football player
- Derrick Roberson (born 1985), American football player
- Derrick Robins (1914–2004), English cricketer
- Derrick Robinson (born 1987), American baseball player
- Derrick Rochester (1940–2016), Jamaican politician
- Derrick Rodgers (born 1971), American football player
- Derrick Rose (born 1988), American basketball player
- Derrick Ross (born 1983), American football player
- Derrick Rossi (born 1966), Canadian biologist
- Derrick Rostagno (born 1965), American tennis player
- Derrick Rowland (born 1959), American basketball player
- Derrick Rutledge (born 1961), American celebrity stylist

=== S ===
- Derrick Sasraku (born 1994), Ghanaian footballer
- Derrick Schofield (1928–1999), English rugby league footballer
- Derrick Seaver (born 1982), American politician
- Derrick Shapande, Zambian footballer
- Derrick Shareef (born 1984), American Islamic terrorist
- Derrick Sharp (born 1971), American-Israeli professional basketball player
- Derrick Shelby (born 1989), American football player
- Derrick Shepard (disambiguation), multiple people
- Derrick Shepherd (born 1970), American attorney and politician
- Derrick Sherwin (1936–2018), British television producer
- Derrick Simmons (politician) (born 1976), American politician
- Derrick Simmons (director), American actor and director
- Derrick Smith (disambiguation), multiple people
- Derrick Spencer (born 1982), South African footballer
- Derrick Spiva (born 1982), American composer and musician
- Derrick Starks (born 1970), American musician
- Derrick Strait (born 1980), American football player
- Derrick Strong (born 1982), American football player
- Derrick Sullivan (1930–1983), Welsh footballer
- Derrick Summers (born 1988), American football player

=== T ===
- Derrick Tabb (born 1975), American musician
- Derrick Taylor (born 1964), American football player
- Derrick Tenai (born 1968), Solomon Islander archer
- Derrick Thomas (1967–2000), American football player
- Derrick Thomas (agricultural scientist) (1944–2013), British agricultural scientist
- Derrick Todd Lee (1968–2016), American serial killers
- Derrick Tomlinson (born 1941), Australian politician
- Derrick Tovey (1926–2016), British haematologist
- Derrick Townsel (born 1988), American football player
- Derrick Townshend (1944–2013), Zimbabwean cricketer
- Derrick Trench (1882–1917), British army officer
- Derrick Tribbett (born 1984), American musician and songwriter
- Derrick Tseng (born 1954), American film producer
- Derrick Tshimanga (born 1988), Belgian-Congolese footballer
- Derrick Turnbow (born 1978), American baseball player

=== V ===
- Derrick Van Dusen (born 1981), American baseball player
- Derrick Verner (1907–1975), Irish soldier

=== W ===
- Derrick Waldroup (born 1962), American wrestler
- Derrick Walker (born 1945), British auto racing team owner
- Derrick Walker (American football) (born 1967), American football player
- Derrick Walser (born 1978), Canadian ice hockey player
- Derrick Walters (1932–2000), British priest
- Derrick Walton (born 1995), American basketball player
- Derrick Wang, American composer
- Derrick Ward (born 1980), American football player
- Derrick Ward (footballer) (1934–2011), English footballer
- Derrick Watkins (born 1983), Australian rugby union footballer
- Derrick Watson (born 1966), American judge
- Derrick Wells (born 1993), American football player
- Derrick Westenra (1853–1921), Irish soldier
- Derrick White (disambiguation), multiple people
- Derrick Wimbush (born 1980), American football player
- Derrick Witherspoon (born 1971), American football player
- Derrick Williams (disambiguation), multiple people
- Derrick Willies (born 1994), American football player
- Derrick Worsley, American actor
- Derrick Wright (born 1928), British author
- Derrick Wyatt (born 1948), British legal scholar

=== Z ===
- Derrick Zimmerman (born 1981), American basketball player

== Surname ==
- Albert Derrick (disambiguation), multiple people
- Butler Derrick (1936–2014), American politician
- Chris Derrick (born 1990), American runner
- Christopher Derrick (1921–2007), English author
- Claud Derrick (1886–1974), American baseball player
- Edward Holbrook Derrick (1898–1976), Australian pathologist
- Gordon Derrick (born 1968), Antiguan banker
- Jantzen Derrick (born 1943), English footballer
- John Derrick (disambiguation), multiple people
- Johnny Van Derrick (1926–1995), British violinist
- Kimberly Derrick (born 1985), American speed skater
- Michael Derrick (disambiguation), multiple people
- Noel Derrick (1926–2018), Australian ice hockey player
- Phyllis Derrick, English lawn bowler
- Puss Derrick (1883–1965), American football player
- Ron Derrick (born 1933), Australian rules footballer
- Samuel Derrick (1724–1769), Irish author
- Ted Derrick (1894–1969), Australian rules footballer
- Thomas Derrick (disambiguation), multiple people
- Tom Derrick (1914–1945), Australian soldier
- William B. Derrick (1943–1913), American bishop and missionary
- William S. Derrick (1802–1852), American politician
- Winston Derrick (1951–2013), Antiguan journalist

== See also ==
- Derek, people with the given name of Derek
- Derick, people with the given name of Derick, a variation of Derrick
- Derreck, people with the given name Derreck
- Darrick, people with the given name of Darrick
- Derricks (disambiguation), a disambiguation page
