= Derick =

Derick is both a masculine given name and a surname. It is a variant of Derrick. People with the name include:

== Given name ==
- Derick Adamson (born 1958), Jamaican runner
- Derick Amadi (born 1984), Nigerian footballer
- Derick Armstrong (born 1979), American football player
- Derick Ashe (1919–2000), British diplomat
- Derick Baegert (1440–1515), German painter
- Derick Brassard (born 1987), Canadian hockey player
- Derick Brownell (born 1974), American soccer player
- Derick Burleson (1963–2016), American writer
- Derick Cabrido (born 1984), Filipino filmmaker
- Derick Close (1927–2021), English motorcycle racer
- Derick Downs (born 1984), American entrepreneur
- Derick Etwaroo (born 1964), Canadian cricketer
- Derick Fernando da Silva (born 2002), Brazilian footballer
- Derick K. Grant (born 1973), American tap dancer
- Derick Hall (born 2001), American football player
- Derick Amory (1899–1981), British politician
- Derick Hetherington (1911–1992), British naval officer
- Derick Hougaard (born 1983), South African rugby union footballer
- Derick Latibeaudiere (born 1961), Jamaican politician
- Derick Martini (born 1972), American screenwriter
- Derick Minnie (born 1986), Italian rugby union footballer
- Derick Neikirk (born 1974), American wrestler and baseball player
- Derick Ogbu (born 1990), Nigerian footballer
- Derick Osei (born 1998), French footballer
- Derick Parry (born 1954), West Indian cricketer
- Derick Roberson (born 1995), American football player
- Derick Silva (born 1998), Brazilian track athlete
- Derick Snow, American voice actor
- Derick Thomson (1921–2012), Scottish poet
- Derick Wanganeen (born 1991), Australian rules footballer
- Derick Wood (1940–2010), English computer scientist

== Surname ==
- Carrie Derick (1862–1941), Canadian botanist

== See also ==
- Derek, people with the given name of Derek
- Derrick, a variation of Derick
- Darrick, people with the given name of Darrick
- Derricks (disambiguation), a disambiguation page
