= Cleavant Derricks =

Cleavant Derricks may refer to:

- Cleavant Derricks (songwriter), prolific songwriter known for many gospel music standards
- Cleavant Derricks (actor), stage and screen actor and musician, in Sliders and Dreamgirls, son of the above
