= Albert Derrick =

Albert Derrick may refer to:

- Albert Derrick (philatelist) (1862–1931), Australian philatelist
- Albert Derrick (footballer, born 1908) (1908–1975), Welsh football forward
- Albert Derrick (footballer, born 1939), his son, Welsh football inside forward
