= Derrick (disambiguation) =

A derrick is a lifting device, especially in an oil field. The word may also refer to:

- Derrick (name)
- Derrick (TV series), a German television series
- Derrick Comedy, a comedy group of film students and writers based in New York City

== See also ==
- Derricks (disambiguation)
