= Dreamgirls =

1981 Broadway musical

- Cover for the second Playbill for Dreamgirls
- Music: Henry Krieger
- Lyrics: Tom Eyen
- Book: Tom Eyen
- Productions: 1981 Broadway; 1983 US tour; 1985 International tour; 1987 Broadway revival; 1997 US tour; 2001 Broadway concert; 2009 US tour; 2016 West End; 2022 UK tour
- Awards: Tony Award for Best Book; Drama Desk Award for Outstanding Book of a Musical

Dreamgirls is a Broadway musical, with music by Henry Krieger and lyrics and book by Tom Eyen. It is based on the show business aspirations and successes of R&B acts such as The Shirelles, James Brown, Jackie Wilson, and others, and particularly The Supremes, as the musical follows the story of a young Black female singing trio from Chicago, Illinois called "The Dreams", who become music superstars.

Staged with a mostly African-American cast and originally starring Jennifer Holliday, Sheryl Lee Ralph, Loretta Devine, Ben Harney, Cleavant Derricks, Vondie Curtis-Hall, and Obba Babatundé, the musical opened on December 20, 1981, at the Imperial Theatre on Broadway. The musical was then nominated for 13 Tony Awards, including the Tony Award for Best Musical, and won six. It was later adapted into a motion picture from DreamWorks and Paramount Pictures in 2006, starring Jamie Foxx, Beyoncé, Eddie Murphy, Jennifer Hudson, Danny Glover, Anika Noni Rose, and Keith Robinson.

== Background ==
Dreamgirls had its beginnings as a project for Nell Carter. Playwright Tom Eyen and conductor Henry Krieger first worked together on the 1975 musical version of Eyen's play The Dirtiest Show in Town. Carter appeared in the musical, and her performance inspired Eyen and Krieger to craft a musical about black back-up singers, which was originally called One Night Only and then given the working title of Project #9. Project #9 was workshopped for Joseph Papp; Nell Carter was joined at this time by Sheryl Lee Ralph and Loretta Devine, who were to play her groupmates. The project was shelved after Carter departed to appear in the soap opera Ryan's Hope in 1978.

A year later, Project #9 was brought back to the table, after catching the interest of Michael Bennett, then in the midst of his success with A Chorus Line. Ralph and Devine returned, and Bennett had Eyen, who was to direct, begin workshopping Big Dreams, as the musical was now known. Joining the cast at this time were Ben Harney, Obba Babatunde, Cleavant Derricks, and twenty-year-old gospel singer Jennifer Holliday as Carter's replacement (after Carter accepted an offer from NBC to star in Gimme a Break!). However, Holliday left the project during the workshopping phase, as she disliked the material and was upset that her character, Effie White, died at the conclusion of the first act. Eyen, Bennett, and Krieger continued to iron out the story and songs. Cheryl Gaines and Phyllis Hyman were both considered as replacements for Holliday.

After two mildly successful workshops which included Jenifer Lewis as Effie, Holliday returned to the project, now known as Dreamgirls. However, she found Effie's role had been reduced significantly in favor of Sheryl Lee Ralph's Deena character, and Holliday eventually quit the project again. After acquiring funding from music industry mogul David Geffen and fellow co-financiers ABC Entertainment, Metromedia, and the Shubert family, Bennett called Holliday back and agreed to rewrite the show's second act and build up her character.

Gender and racial issues are represented in Dreamgirls being a black-cast musical with three female lead roles. Being set in the 1960s, the Black Power Movement was influential on the story line with black artists starting to succeed in the music industry and black music becoming accessible to all audiences, which is a representation of racial boundaries being broken down. The story is based on three women working their way up in the music industry to achieve their dreams while the most powerful people in the industry are men. In the end, the women stand up for their rights and become influential figures.

== Plot summary ==
=== Act I: 1960s ===
In 1962, The Dreamettes, a hopeful teenage Black girl group from Chicago, enter the famous Amateur Night talent competition at the Apollo Theater in Harlem, New York ("I'm Looking for Something", "Goin' Downtown", "Takin' the Long Way Home"). The group is composed of full-figured lead singer Effie White and her best friends, Deena Jones and Lorrell Robinson. For the contest, the Dreamettes sing "Move (You're Steppin' on My Heart)", a song written by Effie's brother, C.C., who accompanies them to the talent show. Unfortunately, they lose the talent show, but backstage, the girls and C.C. meet Curtis Taylor Jr., a former car salesman who offers to manage them.

Curtis convinces James (Jimmy) "Thunder" Early, a popular R&B star, and his manager, Marty, to hire The Dreamettes as backup singers. Though Jimmy Early and the Dreamettes' first performance together is successful ("Fake Your Way to the Top"), Jimmy is desperate for new material. Curtis convinces Jimmy and Marty that they should venture beyond traditional rhythm and blues and soul audiences and aim for the pop market. C.C. composes "Cadillac Car" for Jimmy and the Dreamettes, who tour ("Cadillac Car (Reprise)") and record the single upon their return ("Cadillac Car (Second Reprise)"). "Cadillac Car" makes its way up the pop charts, but a cover version by white pop singers Dave and the Sweethearts ("Cadillac Car" (Third Reprise)) steals the original recording's thunder. Angered by "Cadillac Car"'s usurpation, Curtis, C.C., and Jimmy's producer, Wayne, resort to payola, bribing DJs across the nation to play Jimmy Early and the Dreamettes' next single, "Steppin' to the Bad Side". As a result, the record becomes a major pop hit.

Conflict arises between Marty and Curtis when Curtis moves in on Marty's turf, Jimmy Early. Curtis tries to convince Marty to change Jimmy's image and sound to appeal to the white audience and make Jimmy more successful, and suggests Jimmy play in Miami's Atlantic Hotel, a place that refuses to hire non-white performers; Marty rebuffs and tells Curtis to back off his client. Later, on Lorrell's 18th birthday party, Curtis, referring to himself as Jimmy's manager, calls the Atlantic Hotel's manager to discuss hiring Jimmy Early as a performer; at the same time, Effie and Curtis start a relationship, and Jimmy, a married man, starts an affair with Lorrell. Curtis then succeeds in getting Jimmy to perform in the Atlantic Hotel, which everyone celebrates ("Party, Party").

Strongly determined to make his Black singers household names, Curtis transforms Jimmy Early into a Perry Como-esque pop singer through his performance at the Atlantic Hotel with the Dreamettes ("I Want You Baby"), and later, concentrates on establishing the Dreamettes as their own act, renaming them The Dreams, changing their act to give them a more sophisticated and pop-friendly look and sound. The most crucial of these changes is the establishment of Deena as lead singer, instead of Effie. Effie is resentful of her change in status within the group. C.C. convinces her to go along with Curtis's plan ("Family"). After a fight between Marty and Curtis, Marty quits as Jimmy's manager and Curtis takes over. The Dreams make their club debut in the Crystal Room in Cleveland, singing their first single ("Dreamgirls"). After a triumphant show, the press is eager to meet the newly minted stars ("Press Conference"). Curtis declares to Deena, "I'm going to make you the most famous woman who's ever lived," as the slighted Effie asks "What about me?" ("Only the Beginning"). Over the next few years, the Dreams become a mainstream success with hit singles. As Deena is increasingly feted as a star and Curtis continuously fixates on her, Effie becomes temperamental and unpredictable, suspecting that Curtis and Deena may be having an affair. Effie and Deena quarrel, while Lorrell attempts to keep peace between her bandmates. As Effie continues to disrupt performances and squabble with Deena, Curtis steps in and scolds Effie, warning her to stop. ("Heavy" & "Heavy (Reprise)")

In 1967, the group – now known as "Deena Jones and the Dreams" – is set to make their Las Vegas debut, with Jimmy stopping by to see the girls ("Drivin' Down the Strip"). Jimmy learns from C.C. that Effie had been missing performances; Deena is convinced that she is trying to sabotage the act, while C.C. is convinced that she missed shows because of illness. Curtis replaces Effie with a new singer, Michelle Morris, a change which Effie learns before anyone has a chance to tell her. Effie confronts Curtis, C.C., and the group and tries to tell them that she is pregnant ("It's All Over"), but despite her personal appeal to Curtis ("And I Am Telling You I'm Not Going"), the heartbroken Effie is left behind as Deena Jones and the Dreams forge ahead without her ("Love Love You Baby").

=== Act II: 1970s ===
By 1972, Deena Jones and the Dreams have become the most successful girl group in the country, with Deena having reached superstardom ("'Dreams' Medley" / "Dreamgirls (Reprise)"). Deena has married Curtis, and C.C. is in love with Michelle. Jimmy has gone years without a hit. Curtis shows little interest in updating or revitalizing Jimmy's act because of Curtis's preoccupation with Deena and because of Jimmy's habit of sneaking funk numbers into his repertoire of pop-friendly songs. Effie is back in Chicago, a single mother to her daughter, Magic, struggling to get another break. Marty, who is now her manager, compels her to rebuild her confidence and give up her "diva behaviors." Once she does, Effie is able to make a show business comeback ("I Am Changing"). In contrast to Effie's struggling return to her musical career, Deena wants to stop singing and become an actress. During a Vogue photo shoot ("One More Picture Please"), Deena informs Curtis of her career plans, but Curtis refuses to let her go ("When I First Saw You"). Deena is not the only one chafing under Curtis's control; C.C. is enraged by Curtis's constant rearrangements of his songs, including an emotional ballad, entitled "One Night Only", which Curtis wants instead recorded to reflect the "new sound" he is inventing.

Deena and the Dreams and Jimmy perform at a National Democratic fundraiser, on a bill featuring such groups as The Five Tuxedos ("Got to Be Good Times"). While waiting backstage to go on, Jimmy finds himself arguing with Lorrell regarding the nature of their relationship and whether Jimmy will tell his wife about their affair and marry Lorrell ("Ain't No Party"). Lorrell is in tears as Jimmy takes to the stage to perform, and turns to Deena for support. As Jimmy pleads to Lorrell through his music ("I Meant You No Harm"), Deena tries to help Lorrell resolve her situation, and Michelle convinces the artistically frustrated C.C. to go find his sister and reconcile with her ("Quintette"). Midway through "I Meant You No Harm", Jimmy falls apart and decides that he "can't sing any more sad songs." Desperate to keep his set going, Jimmy launches into a wild, improvised funk number ("The Rap"), dropping his pants during the performance. An embarrassed Curtis fires Jimmy as soon as his set concludes ("Firing of Jimmy"). Lorrell ends her affair with Jimmy as well. The heartbroken Jimmy fades into obscurity, refusing to "beg" for Curtis' help.

Marty arranges for C.C. to meet and reconcile with Effie at a recording studio ("I Miss You, Old Friend"). C.C. apologizes for his role in handicapping her career, and Effie records C.C.'s "One Night Only" in its original ballad format. "One Night Only" begins climbing the charts, causing an enraged Curtis to rush-release Deena and the Dreams' cover version and use massive amounts of payola to push their version up the charts and Effie's version down. Deena and the Dreams' version of the song becomes a hit. Amidst their performance of the song in Los Angeles, Deena, Lorrell, and Michelle each think of their dreams, which diverge from their current status as musical performers, and inwardly express their desire to quit the music industry: Deena wants to become an actress, Lorrell wants to live her own life and move on from Jimmy, while Michelle wants to settle down with C.C. In the end, all three exclaim, "All of us got other things than singing on our minds." After the performance, film executives approach Deena and express their excitement for making Deena's first film; Curtis pulls her aside and refuses her to go through with the film as there is no music. Deena stays insistent, and as Curtis refuses further, Deena begs Curtis to let her star in the film, to which an angered possessive Curtis tells her that she is his wife and that she is not going anywhere without him ("One Night Only (Reprise)"). As Effie's recording of "One Night Only" descends the charts with Deena and the Dreams' version's ascent, Effie, C.C., and Marty discover Curtis's scheme and later, at a Dreams concert, confront him backstage, threatening legal action ("I'm Somebody" & "Faith in Myself"). As Curtis is forced to make arrangements with Effie's lawyer to reverse his wrongdoings, Effie and Deena reconcile, and Deena learns Effie was pregnant with Curtis's child before her firing from the group. Realizing the kind of man Curtis truly is, Deena finally finds the courage to leave him and live her own life. Effie's "One Night Only" becomes a number-one hit, as the Dreams break up so that Deena can pursue her movie career. At their farewell concert ("Hard to Say Goodbye, My Love"), Effie rejoins the group on stage for the final number, and all four Dreams sing their signature song one last time.

== Casts of notable productions ==
Character	Broadway	US Tour	Broadway Revival	Actors Fund Concert	US Tour	West End	UK Tour
Character	1981	1983	1987	2001	2009	2016	2021
Effie Melody White	Jennifer Holliday	Jennifer Holliday	Lillias White	Lillias White	Moya Angela	Amber Riley	Nicole Raquel Dennis
Deena Jones	Sheryl Lee Ralph	Linda Leilani Brown	Alisa Gyse	Audra McDonald	Syesha Mercado	Liisi LaFontaine	Natalie Kassanga
Lorrell Robinson	Loretta Devine	Arnetia Walker	Arnetia Walker	Heather Headley	Adrienne Warren	Ibinabo Jack	Paige Peddie
Curtis Taylor Jr.	Ben Harney	Larry Riley	Weyman Thompson	Norm Lewis	Chaz Lamar Shepherd	Joe Aaron Reid	Dom Hartley-Harris
James "Thunder" Early	Cleavant Derricks	Clinton Derricks-Carroll	Herbert L. Rawlings, Jr.	Billy Porter	Chester Gregory	Adam J. Bernard	Brandon Lee Sears
C.C. White	Obba Babatundé	Lawrence Clayton	Kevyn Morrow	Darius de Haas	Trevon Davis	Tyrone Huntley	Shem Omari James
Michelle Morris	Deborah Burrell	Deborah Burrell	Susan Beaubian	Tamara Tunie	Margaret Hoffman	Lily Frazer	Brianna Ogunbawo
Marty Madison	Vondie Curtis-Hall	Weyman Thompson	Roy L. Jones	James Stovall	Milton Craig Nealy	Nicholas Bailey	Jo Servi
Wayne	Tony Franklin	Maurice Felder	Milton Craig Nealy	Bobby Daye	Terrance Lemar Thomas	Rohan Richards	Lukas Hunt

== Musical numbers ==
Act I
Scene 1: The Apollo Theater

- "I'm Looking for Something" – The Stepp Sisters
- "Goin' Downtown" – Little Albert and the Tru-Tones
- "Takin' the Long Way Home" – Tiny Joe Dixon
- "Move (You're Steppin' on My Heart)" – The Dreamettes
- "Fake Your Way to the Top" – Jimmy Early, The Jimmy Early Band, and the Dreamettes
- "Cadillac Car" – Curtis, Jimmy, C.C., Marty, and the Company

Scene 2: On the Road

- "Cadillac Car (Reprise)" – The Company

Scene 3: A Recording Studio

- "Cadillac Car (Second Reprise)" – The Company

Scene 4: Limbo

- "Cadillac Car (Third Reprise)" – Dave and the Sweethearts
- "Steppin' to the Bad Side" – Curtis, C.C., Jimmy, Wayne, the Dreamettes, and the Company

Scene 5: A Hotel in St. Louis

- "Party, Party" – The Company

Scene 6: Miami

- "I Want You Baby" – Jimmy and the Dreamettes

Scene 7: Dressing Room in the Atlantic Hotel

- "Family" – C.C., Curtis, Jimmy, Deena, and Lorrell

Scene 8: Cleveland

- "Dreamgirls" – The Dreams
- "Press Conference" – The Company
- "Only the Beginning" – Curtis, Deena, and Effie

Scene 9: A TV Studio

- "Heavy" – The Dreams

Scene 10: San Francisco

- "Heavy (Reprise)" - The Dreams and Curtis

Scene 11: Las Vegas (Backstage)

- "Drivin' Down the Strip" – Jimmy
- "It's All Over" – Curtis, Effie, Deena, Lorrell, C.C., Michelle, and Jimmy
- "And I Am Telling You I'm Not Going" – Effie

Scene 12: Las Vegas (On Stage)

- "Love Love You Baby" – Deena Jones and the Dreams

Act II
Scene 1: Las Vegas Hilton

- "'Dreams' Medley" ^{1} – Deena Jones and the Dreams and the Company

Scene 2: Chicago Nightclub

- "I Am Changing" – Effie

Scene 3: Vogue Magazine Photo Call

- "One More Picture Please" – The Company
- "When I First Saw You" – Curtis and Deena

Scene 4: National Democratic Fundraiser

- "Got to Be Good Times" – The Five Tuxedos
- "Ain't No Party" – Lorrell and Jimmy
- "I Meant You No Harm" – Jimmy
- "Quintette" – Deena, Lorrell, C.C., and Michelle
- "The Rap" – Jimmy, C.C., Marty, Curtis, Frank, Lorrell, and the Company

Scene 5: A Chicago Recording Studio

- "I Miss You Old Friend" – Effie, Marty, C.C., and Les Style
- "One Night Only" – Effie

Scene 6: Los Angeles

- "One Night Only (Reprise)" – Deena Jones and the Dreams and the Company

Scene 7: Chicago

- "I'm Somebody" – Deena Jones and the Dreams
- "Faith in Myself" ^{2} – Effie

Scene 8: New York

- "Hard to Say Goodbye, My Love" ^{3} – Deena Jones and the Dreams

Notes

- ^{1} "'Dreams' Medley" was the original Act II opening, a medley reprising the songs "Dreamgirls", "Move", "Love Love You Baby", "Family", "Heavy" and "Cadillac Car", performed by Deena Jones and the Dreams, as well as "Press Conference", performed by the Company. When the musical's national tour began in 1983, the Act II opening was changed to be a reprise of "Dreamgirls". With the new national tour in 2009, a new song, "What Love Can Do", replaced the Act II Opening; Willie Reale, who had co- written a song for the film adaptation, wrote the song's lyrics, with Krieger composing the music. The 2016 West End production replaced the Act II opening with a full-length reprise of "Love Love You Baby" with new lyrics by Reale.
- ^{2} Listen, a song originally written for the film adaptation, was modified for and added to the 2009 U.S. tour production of Dreamgirls as an 11 o'clock duet between Deena and Effie, and replaced an unnamed number after "Faith in Myself". "Listen"'s lyrics was revised for the 2016 West End production. Music and lyrics by Henry Krieger, Scott Cutler, Anne Preven, Beyoncé and Willie Reale.
- ^{3} This number is not the finale; the finale is a reprise of "Dreamgirls", which is not listed as a musical number.

== Productions ==
=== Broadway ===
Dreamgirls premiered on Broadway at the Imperial Theatre on December 20, 1981, and closed on August 11, 1985, after 1,521 performances. The production was directed by Michael Bennett, produced by Bennett, Bob Avian, Geffen Records, and The Shubert Organization, and choreographed by Bennett and Michael Peters. It starred Sheryl Lee Ralph as Deena Jones, Jennifer Holliday as Effie White, Loretta Devine as Lorrell Robinson, Ben Harney as Curtis Taylor Jr., Cleavant Derricks as James "Thunder" Early, and Obba Babatundé as C. C. White. Dreamgirls proved to be a star-making vehicle for several of its performers, particularly Holliday, whose performance as Effie received significant praise.

The production received critical acclaim; in The New York Times, Frank Rich's review began "When Broadway history is being made, you can feel it."

Holliday's recording of Effie's solo "And I Am Telling You I'm Not Going" was a #1 single on the Billboard R&B charts in 1982. For the Dreamgirls original cast recording, the producers decided to present the intricately interwoven musical sequences as individual songs, cutting approximately half of the score. The cast recording won two Grammy awards, Best Musical Album and Best Vocal Performance for Jennifer Holliday's "And I Am Telling You I'm Not Going".

=== US tours ===
Bennett took Dreamgirls on an abbreviated national tour in 1983 with planned two year run in Los Angeles, with Jennifer Holliday remaining as Effie, with Larry Riley, Linda Leilani Brown, Arnetia Walker, Lawrence Clayton, and Cleavant Derricks' twin brother Clinton Derricks-Carroll as her co-stars. Holliday left the production after the Los Angeles run and her understudy, Lillias White, took over the role. The show played extended engagements in two U.S. cities, San Francisco and Chicago, but was dissolved due to high costs.

A second international tour began in 1985, with Sharon Brown as Effie. By 1987, Lillias White, Jennifer Holliday's understudy in the first road production, came back to play the role in a Broadway revival at the Ambassador Theatre, which ran from June 28, 1987, to November 29, 1987, and was nominated for the 1988 Tony Award, Best Revival. By this time, Michael Bennett had fallen ill due to AIDS-related complications, and he died on July 2, 1987.

A US tour began in 1997 with direction and choreography by Tony Stevens, based on the original direction and choreography by Michael Bennett. The tour was set to open on Broadway in July 1998; however, it ultimately closed in Upstate New York while waiting for a Broadway theatre to become available. In 2004, another national tour began starring American Idol contestant Frenchie Davis, who gained praise for her role as Effie and Angela Robinson as Deena.

Another US tour began at the Apollo Theater, New York City in November 2009, with direction and choreography by Robert Longbottom, new scenic design by the original set designer Robin Wagner, and new costume designs by William Ivey Long. American Idol alum Syesha Mercado starred as Deena, with Adrienne Warren as Lorrell, Moya Angela as Effie, Chester Gregory as Jimmy, and Chaz Lamar Shepherd as Curtis. This production included a new song for Deena and the Dreams at the top of Act II ("What Love Can Do"), as well as the song "Listen" from the film, which was re-written as a duet between Deena and Effie. In 2011 the creative team took the production to Montecasino, South Africa, with a local cast; however, it closed early.

=== 2001 Actors Fund of America Concert ===
In 2001 a concert performance of the show was staged on Broadway at the Ford Center for the Performing Arts starring Lillias White as Effie, Audra McDonald as Deena, Heather Headley as Lorrelle, Billy Porter as Jimmy, Darius de Haas as C.C., Tamara Tunie as Michelle, and Norm Lewis as Curtis, with appearances by E. Lynn Harris, Adriane Lenox, Brian Stokes Mitchell, Alice Ripley, Emily Skinner, and Patrick Wilson among many others. The concert was in benefit of the Actors Fund of America, and was one of the first major public gatherings to be held in New York City after 9/11. It was recorded and later released in its entirety on CD.

=== West End ===
In February 2016 it was confirmed that Dreamgirls would have its London premiere at The Savoy Theatre with Amber Riley taking on the role of Effie White. Previews began on November 19, 2016, with an official opening on December 14 of that year. Riley initially performed the role for 7 out of 8 shows per week, but in July 2017 reduced her performances to 6 times a week and then 5 in August, with Marisha Wallace and Karen Mav serving as alternates. Riley left the role and from November 20, 2017, forward, Moya Angela, who played the role of Effie in the 2009 US tour, Marisha Wallace and Karen Mav all shared the role of Effie. The production was directed and choreographed by Casey Nicholaw, with scenic design by Tim Hatley, costume design by Gregg Barnes, sound design by Richard Brooker and lighting design by Hugh Vanstone.

Prior to Riley's departure, the production made a live cast recording of the show, which was released on May 12, 2017. The production closed on January 12, 2019.

=== UK tour ===
In December 2021 Dreamgirls began an 15 month tour of the UK. Previews began on December 14 at the Liverpool Empire Theatre with its press night on December 21 before visiting 26 more venues. The role of Effie White is performed by Nicole Raquel Dennis. Sharlene Hector is the alternate Effie White, Hector is well known for being a lead vocalist for British band Basement Jaxx. The production retained Nicholaw's direction and all design elements save for Barnes' costumes, which were designed by Hatley.

=== Planned Broadway revival ===
A Broadway revival directed and choreographed by Camille A. Brown was originally planned to open in the fall of 2026. International open calls to cast its leads will take place in New York, Los Angeles, Chicago, Atlanta, Detroit, Miami, London, Toronto, Mexico City, Amsterdam, Rome, and Paris. Jennifer Hudson who portrayed the role of Effie White in the film adaptation will serve as a producer of the revival. In August 2026, the producers announced that the revival was still moving forward, but it would not be opening in the fall of that year as originally planned.

== Awards and honors ==
=== Original Broadway production ===
Year	Award	Category	Nominee	Result
1982	Tony Award	Best Musical		Nominated
1982	Tony Award	Best Book of a Musical	Tom Eyen	Won
1982	Tony Award	Best Original Score	Henry Krieger and Tom Eyen	Nominated
1982	Tony Award	Best Performance by a Leading Actor in a Musical	Ben Harney	Won
1982	Tony Award	Best Performance by a Leading Actress in a Musical	Jennifer Holliday	Won
1982	Tony Award	Best Performance by a Leading Actress in a Musical	Sheryl Lee Ralph	Nominated
1982	Tony Award	Best Performance by a Featured Actor in a Musical	Cleavant Derricks	Won
1982	Tony Award	Best Performance by a Featured Actor in a Musical	Obba Babatundé	Nominated
1982	Tony Award	Best Direction of a Musical	Michael Bennett	Nominated
1982	Tony Award	Best Choreography	Michael Bennett and Michael Peters	Won
1982	Tony Award	Best Scenic Design	Robin Wagner	Nominated
1982	Tony Award	Best Costume Design	Theoni V. Aldredge	Nominated
1982	Tony Award	Best Lighting Design	Tharon Musser	Won
1982	Drama Desk Award	Outstanding Musical		Nominated
1982	Drama Desk Award	Outstanding Book of a Musical	Tom Eyen	Won
1982	Drama Desk Award	Outstanding Actress in a Musical	Jennifer Holliday	Won
1982	Drama Desk Award	Outstanding Actress in a Musical	Sheryl Lee Ralph	Nominated
1982	Drama Desk Award	Outstanding Featured Actor in a Musical	Cleavant Derricks	Won
1982	Drama Desk Award	Outstanding Featured Actor in a Musical	Ben Harney	Nominated
1982	Drama Desk Award	Outstanding Director of a Musical	Michael Bennett	Nominated
1982	Drama Desk Award	Outstanding Lyrics	Tom Eyen	Nominated
1982	Drama Desk Award	Outstanding Set Design	Robin Wagner	Won
1982	Drama Desk Award	Outstanding Costume Design	Theoni V. Aldredge	Nominated
1982	Drama Desk Award	Outstanding Lighting Design	Tharon Musser	Won
1983	Grammy Award	Best Cast Show Album	Henry Krieger (composer), Tom Eyen (lyricist), David Foster (producer)	Won
1983	Grammy Award	Best Female R&B Vocal Performance	Jennifer Holliday ("And I Am Telling You I'm Not Going")	Won

=== 1987 Broadway revival ===
Year	Award	Category	Nominee	Result
1988	Tony Award	Best Revival		Nominated
1988	Drama Desk Award	Outstanding Revival		Nominated
1988	Drama Desk Award	Outstanding Featured Actor in a Musical	Herbert L. Rawlings, Jr.	Nominated

=== Original West End production ===
Year	Award	Category	Nominee	Result
2017	Laurence Olivier Award	Best New Musical		Nominated
2017	Laurence Olivier Award	Best Actress in a Musical	Amber Riley	Won
2017	Laurence Olivier Award	Best Supporting Actor in a Musical	Adam J. Bernard	Won
2017	Laurence Olivier Award	Best Costume Design	Greg Barnes	Nominated
2017	Laurence Olivier Award	Outstanding Achievement in Music	Henry Krieger	Nominated
2017	Evening Standard Theatre Award	Best Musical		Nominated
2017	Evening Standard Theatre Award	Best Musical Performance	Amber Riley	Won

== Film adaptation ==
David Geffen, founder of Geffen Records and one of the play's financiers, leased the Dreamgirls film rights to Warner Bros. in the 1980s through his Geffen Pictures company. Although the film was announced several times, with singers such as Whitney Houston (as Deena), Lauryn Hill (another Deena candidate), and Kelly Price (as Effie) tapped to star, the studio eventually abandoned the project. Geffen eventually began development on the film at DreamWorks SKG, a company he co-founded, in 2004. Warner Bros., which controlled the film rights to Dreamgirls, was also originally announced as a co-financier of the film, but before shooting began, Paramount Pictures stepped in as co-producer after Warner expressed concerns over the film's budget. Laurence Mark served as producer of the DreamWorks/Paramount adaptation of Dreamgirls, written and directed by Bill Condon, who had earned an Oscar nomination for his screenplay adaptation of Chicago.

The film adaptation of Dreamgirls stars Jamie Foxx as Curtis, Beyoncé as Deena, Eddie Murphy as Jimmy, Danny Glover as Marty, Jennifer Hudson as Effie, Anika Noni Rose as Lorrell, and Keith Robinson as C.C.. Dreamgirls was first exhibited in special ten-day road show engagements beginning December 25, 2006. Subsequently, the film went into national release on December 25, 2006. Loretta Devine, who originated the Lorrell role, has a cameo role as a jazz singer in the film. Two other alumni of the Broadway production – Hinton Battle (a James "Thunder" Early replacement) and Yvette Cason (Charlene; Effie White understudy) – also appear. While much of the material remains the same as that of the stage musical, some of the stage musical's songs (most notably "Ain't No Party" and the Act II Opener) were removed, and four new songs were added. A number of changes were made to the story as well, including the additions of more overt references to The Supremes and Motown, the death of Jimmy (who is found dead on the road after a heroin overdose), and the relocation of the story's main setting from Chicago to Detroit. The film won two Academy Awards: Best Supporting Actress (Jennifer Hudson) and Best Sound Mixing.

To give the story more exposure for the upcoming film release, DreamWorks Pictures and the licensee of the original play, The Tams-Witmark Music Library, announced they would pay the licensing fees for all non-professional stage performances of Dreamgirls for the calendar year of 2006. DreamWorks hoped to encourage amateur productions of Dreamgirls, and familiarize a wider audience with the play. As a result, more than fifty high schools, colleges, community theaters, and other non-commercial theater entities staged productions of Dreamgirls in 2006, and DreamWorks spent up to $250,000 subsidizing the licensing.

== Similarities to The Supremes' story ==
From the show's opening, Michael Bennett, Henry Krieger, Tom Eyen, and the Dreamgirls producers publicly denied basing the musical's plot on the story of the Supremes. It is widely believed these public denials were made in order to avoid lawsuits from the Supremes, Berry Gordy, and Motown as the similarities in the plot and the Supremes' story were strikingly close. Mary Wilson loved Dreamgirls so much that she named her first autobiography, Dreamgirl: My Life as a Supreme after the musical. Diana Ross publicly denied ever seeing the show despite including "Family" in her 1983 Central Park concert. A Broadway urban myth circled at the time that Ross had seen the show in disguise and stormed out at the end of Act I upset. In an Oprah: Where Are They Now? interview from 2014, Ralph said Michael Bennett instructed her not to portray Deena like Diana Ross or else they would be sued. In the same interview, Ralph recalled encountering Ross in New York shortly after the musical's opening where Ross coldly brushed her off, leading her to speculate that Ross had seen or knew of the show. Tom Eyen denied that he had the Supremes in mind when he wrote the book. He is quoted as saying in 1986: "I didn't grow up with the Supremes...I grew up with the Shirelles. Dreamgirls isn't about any one group. It's a cavalcade of black Motown singers: the Shirelles, the Chiffons, Martha and the Vandellas, Little Richard and Stevie Wonder. All the characters are larger than life." Early in Michael Bennett's career, he was a dancer on the 1960s NBC musical variety series Hullabaloo (TV series) where he danced behind The Supremes on several of their appearances on the show. In her acceptance speech at the 64th Golden Globe Awards, Jennifer Hudson, who played the role of Effie in the film, dedicated the award to Florence Ballard, who many suspect the character of Effie was based on.

Similarities between true life events and the plot of the musical include:

- Both the Supremes and the Dreams started off with "ettes" in their group's name. The Supremes were originally the Primettes; the Dreams start off as the Dreamettes.
- Both the Supremes and the Dreams did background vocal work for established recording artists before becoming famous.
- Diana Ross was chosen as the lead singer of the Supremes because of her distinctive, softer, commercial voice with crossover appeal, just as Deena Jones is chosen as the lead singer of the Dreams due to similar qualities.
- The storyline of the love affair between Deena Jones and Curtis Taylor Jr. mirrors Diana Ross and Berry Gordy Jr.'s love affair and the emphasis of Diana's/Deena's success over the group's.
- The storyline of Lorrell Robinson and James "Thunder" Early's relationship resembles Mary Wilson's relationships with fellow Motown artists as well as Welsh singer Tom Jones.
- Deena Jones is coached to be the spokesperson for the group during press conferences, just as Diana Ross was for the Supremes.
- The press was instructed to refer to Diana Ross as "Miss Ross." In Dreamgirls, the press is instructed to refer to Deena Jones as "Miss Jones."
- As Diana Ross was pushed forward as the star of the Supremes, Florence Ballard became difficult to work with when she was forced into the background. Effie White reacts in the same manner when Deena Jones is pushed forward as the star of the Dreams.
- Florence Ballard and the character Effie White missed performances, recording sessions, allegedly illnesses, and gained weight, which resulted in them being fired from their groups in Las Vegas in 1967.
- Cindy Birdsong went on to perform with the Supremes the same night Florence Ballard was fired, just as Michelle Morris goes on to perform with the Dreams the same night Effie White is fired.
- The Supremes became "Diana Ross & the Supremes" in 1967 while in Las Vegas. The Dreams became "Deena Jones & the Dreams" in 1967 while in Las Vegas.
- After Diana Ross left the Supremes in 1970 to pursue other projects such as film work, in 1972 she starred in her first motion picture, the Motown-produced Lady Sings the Blues. The character of Deena Jones leaves the Dreams in 1972 to pursue a career as an actress.
- Both Florence Ballard and Effie fall on hard times following their departures from their groups. Florence ended up on welfare in the early 70s.

== See also ==
- Dreamgirls: Original Broadway Cast Album
- Dreamgirls: Music from the Motion Picture
- Dreamgirl: My Life As a Supreme, the 1986 autobiography of former Supremes member Mary Wilson
