= Derricks (disambiguation) =

Derricks is a surname. Notable people with the name include:

- Anthony Derricks (born 1976), former Arena Football League defensive specialist/k.o. returner stand-out
- Cleavant Derricks (actor) (born 1953), American actor and singer-songwriter
- Cleavant Derricks (songwriter) (1910–1977), pastor and choir director at a number of black Baptist churches
- Clinton Derricks-Carroll (born 1953), American actor and musician
- Marguerite Derricks (born 1961), American choreographer, ballerina and actress

== See also ==
- Derrick (disambiguation)
