= Derek White =

Derek White may refer to:

- Derek White (rugby union) (born 1958), Scottish former rugby union player
- Derek White (racing driver) (born 1970), NASCAR driver

== See also ==
- Derek Whyte (born 1968), former Scottish footballer
- Derrick White (disambiguation)
