= Derek Jones =

Derek Jones may refer to:

== Government ==
- Derek Jones (civil servant), Permanent Secretary to the Welsh Government
- Derek Jones (civil servant, born 1927) (1927–2008), British and Hong Kong government official
- Derek Jones (mayor) (1927–2013), English Congregationalist missionary and politician in Botswana

== Sports ==
- Derek Jones (American football), American college football coach and former pro player
- Derek Jones (Canadian football) (born 1992), Canadian football defensive back
- Derek Jones (footballer) (1929–2006), footballer for Tranmere Rovers

== Others ==
- Derek Jones (bishop) (born 1961), American Anglican bishop
- Derek Jones (musician), American musician
- Derek C. Jones (born c. 1946), economist at Hamilton College
- Derek W. Jones (born 1933), professor of applied oral science and biomaterials

== See also ==
- Derrick Jones (disambiguation)
