= Derek Johnson =

Derek Johnson may refer to:

- Derek Johnson (runner) (1933–2004), British track and field athlete
- Derek Johnson (musician) (born 1987), American Christian musician
- Derek Johnson (baseball) (born 1971), American baseball coach
- Derek Wayne Johnson (born 1983), American film director, screenwriter, film producer and actor
- Derek Acorah (Derek Johnson, 1950–2020), self-described spirit medium
- Derek Johnson (politician), MLA in Manitoba
- Derek Johnson (runner, born 1999), American steeplechase runner, 2021 All-American for the Virginia Cavaliers track and field team

== See also ==
- Derrick Johnson (disambiguation)
