= Derek Lewis =

Derek Lewis may refer to:

- Derek Lewis (footballer) (1929–1953), English footballer
- Derek Lewis (administrator), former Director General of HM Prison Service
- Derek Lewis (American politician) (born 1986), American politician
- Derek Lewis (percussionist), UK percussionist in soul bands

== See also ==
- Derrick Lewis (disambiguation)
