= Derrick Clark =

Derrick Clark may refer to:

- Derrick Clark (American football) (1971–2026), American football running back
- Derrick Clark (footballer) (1935–1985), English footballer
- Derrick Clark (basketball) (born 1971), American college basketball coach
