= Derreck =

Derreck is a given name. Notable people with the name include:

- Derreck Brooks (born 1994), American basketball player
- Derreck Calvert (1919-2003), Australian cricketer
- Derreck Kayongo (born 1970), Ugandan entrepreneur and human rights innovator
- Derreck Robinson (born 1982), American football player

== See also ==
- Derrick (name)
