= John Derrick =

John Derrick may refer to:

- John Derrick (coroner) (born c. 1538), noted for the first historic mention of the sport of cricket
- John Derrick (footballer) (1891–1938), English footballer
- John Derrick (cricketer) (1963–2017), Welsh cricketer

== See also ==
- John Derricke (fl. 1578–1581), English writer and artist
- John Derek (1926–1998), American actor, director and photographer
