= Derek Evans =

Derek Evans may refer to:

- Derek Evans (EastEnders), a fictional character on the British soap opera EastEnders
- Derek Evans (Sunset Beach), a fictional character on the American soap opera Sunset Beach

== See also ==
- Derrick Evans (disambiguation)
