= Derrick Gibson (disambiguation) =

Derrick Gibson (born 1979) is an American football player.

Derrick Gibson may also refer to:

- Derrick Gibson (baseball) (born 1975), American baseball player
- Derrick Gibson (businessman), disqualified candidate in 2022 New York gubernatorial election
