= Derrick Worsley =

American actor

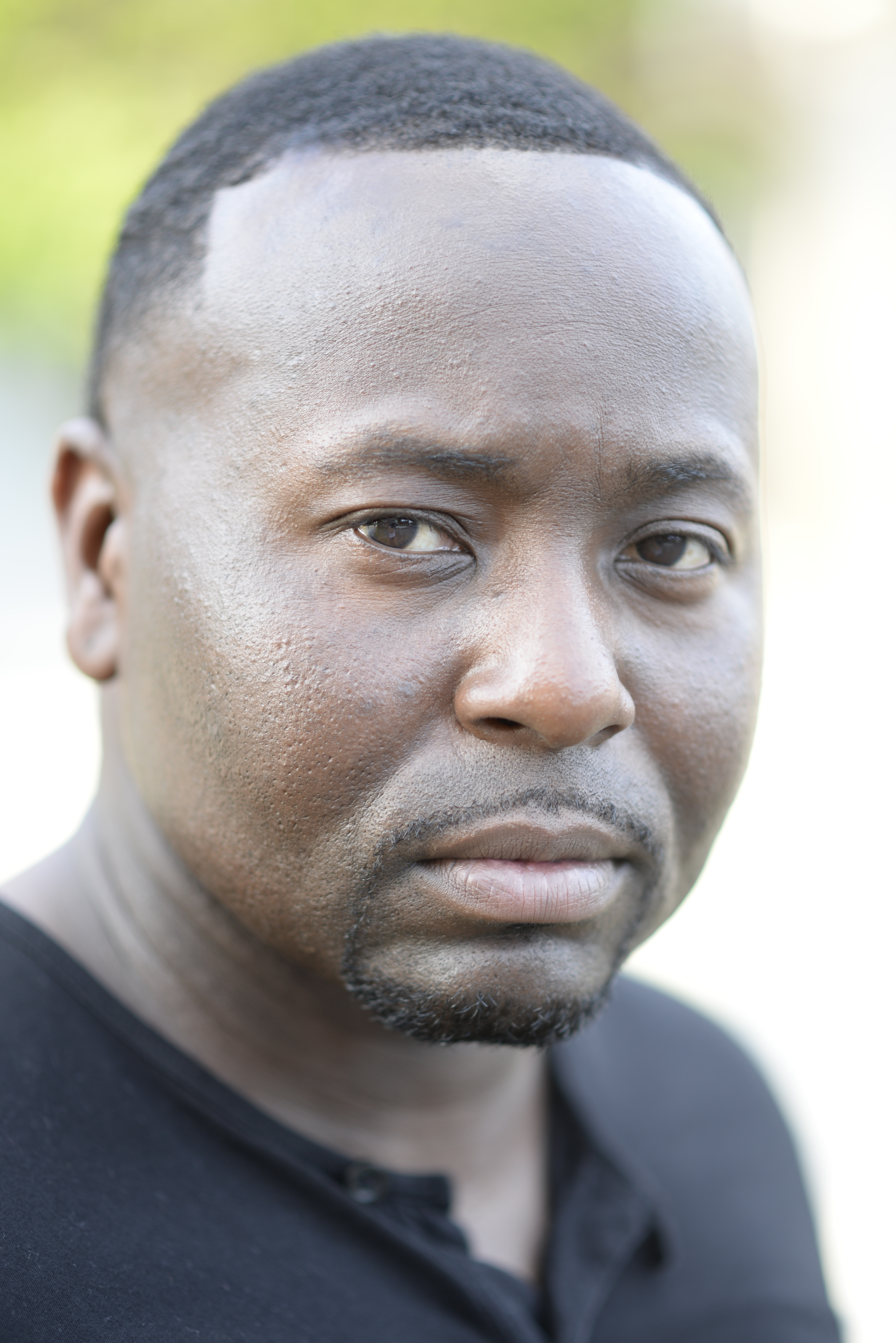
- Occupation: Actor
- Known for: Coach Jones, Being Mary Jane

Derrick Worsley is an American actor. He appeared in the movie Taken 3 as Officer Edwards. Worsley has also appeared on the television programs, Nashville, The Haves and Have Nots, I Want That, Satisfaction, and Survivor Remorse, and played Coach Jones on Being Mary Jane. Derrick is married to Crystal Worsley (2003) and they have three children.

== Filmography ==
=== Film ===
- All Eyez on Me (2017)
- Leavey (2016)
- Proverbs (2016)
- Sleepless Night (2016)
- Taken 3 (2015)

=== Television ===
- Being Mary Jane (2016)
- Nashville (2013-2014)
- Survivor Remorse (2014)
- Satisfaction (2014)
- The Haves and Have Nots (2014)
- I Want That (2013)
