= Derrick Pearson =

American radio personality

Derrick Pearson is a sports announcer and radio personality.

== Biography ==
Graduated from Washington-Lee High School, 1980. Arlington, Virginia where he played football and baseball for the Generals.

Pearson was the announcer for the Utah Snowbears in the 2004–05 ABA season. During the summer of 2005 Pearson began hosting the new, weekly ABA show, ABA Live Talk!

Pearson was also the announcer of the Great Eight Tournament in March 2006 in Rochester. Pearson was also the host of Carolina Blitz TV Show in the late 1990s. Pearson was co-host of Redskins Magazine TV Show in Washington, DC. Pearson was host of The Starting Line Up, a radio sports talk show on 1320 KFAN in Salt Lake City, Utah with Ron Boone and Allen Handy.

In August 2006, it was announced that Derrick Pearson would be hosting a weekly piece, similar to ABA Live Talk!, called "Inside the CBA". Pearson is the General Manager of the CBA Utah Eagles, and is the listed General Manager for the Atlanta Krunk of the CBA.

In 2023, Pearson and his wife Rebecca, purchased a radio station in Downtown Lincoln, Nebraska, and Pearson would do sports radio talk on KNTK, The Ticket, as well as welcome local sportspeople for radio events.

== See also ==
- Nebraska Cornhuskers football
