= Derick Downs =

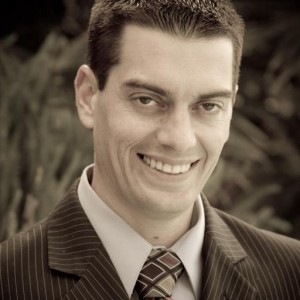
- Born: 20 January 1984 (age 41)
- Known for: Novelty websites, marketing services, Pokeymongo
- Website: derickdowns.com

Derick Downs (born 18 January 1984) is a San Diego–based entrepreneur notable for creating a large number of websites and business ventures, including Pokeymongo, various novelty websites such as Ship Your Glitter and Drop A Deuce, and advertising service Follow Per Click. Downs states that he has created around 50 such websites, some of which have been moderately successful, with Pokeymongo reportedly receiving thousands of concurrent users when it launched. Downs has also been a speaker at a number of conferences, including "Art of Marketing" by the San Diego chapter of the American Marketing Association.

== Websites and services ==
=== Pokeymongo ===
Downs created the website Pokeymongo in July 2016. The site provides third-party information about the popular mobile game Pokémon Go, the website's name being a deliberate misspelling of the name of the game. Downs decided to sell the website on the basis that he did not have enough time to run it. Pokeymongo sold for US$3500 on bidding website Flippa.

=== Follow Per Click ===
Follow Per Click is a Google-based advertising service created by Downs. Its main premise is that it uses personalised banner advertisements targeted at specific users.

=== Other ventures ===
Downs runs Outside The Box Digital Agency (OTBDA), a marketing agency. He also owns a dog treat line, Nak Snacks.

=== Derick Downs Book – Flipping Domains ===
Flipping Domains: Derick Downs provides some great ways to build a side income flipping domains online.

== Recognition ==
Downs has been recognized in national industry publications for his contributions to the medical aesthetics field. In 2024, *MedEsthetics Magazine* featured him in an article discussing accessible, patient-centered financing models in the aesthetics industry.
