= Clinton Derricks-Carroll =

American actor

- Born: Clinton Derricks; May 15, 1953 (age 73); Knoxville, Tennessee, United States
- Occupations: Actor, singer-songwriter
- Years active: 1979–2000
- Father: Cleavant Derricks, Sr.
- Relatives: Cleavant Derricks (twin brother)

Clinton Derricks-Carroll (born May 15, 1953, in Knoxville, Tennessee) is an American actor and musician who is best known for Introducing Dorothy Dandridge (1999), Wally Brown (1979) and Sanford (1980–1981).

== Early life ==
Derricks was born in Knoxville, Tennessee to a pianist mother and Baptist preacher/composer Cleavant Derricks, Sr, famous for his popular gospel music hymn Just a Little Talk with Jesus. His twin brother is Cleavant Derricks, who is also an actor.

== Career ==
Clinton starred in the TV series Wally Brown (1979, as Wally Brown) and Sanford (1980–1981, as Cliff Anderson). He also had guest appearances in a number of other series, notably Hill Street Blues and Sliders and he wrote the music for the 1979 TV movie When Hell Freezes Over, I'll Skate.

On Sliders he played the "double" of his brother's character on three occasions ("The King Is Back", "Greatfellas" and "The Prince of Slides"). This was used instead of split screen.

In 1986 Derricks-Carroll appeared on the London stage in the role of Captain Ebony in the musical Time.

He authored the book Buy Golly!: The History of the Golliwog in 2005, published by New Cavendish Books.

== Filmography ==
Year	Title	Role	Notes
1979	When Hell Freezes Over, I'll Skate		TV movie Also served as composer
1979	Paris	Chico	1 episode
1979	Wally Brown	Wally Brown	
1980	The Further Adventures of Wally Brown	Wally Brown	TV movie
1980	The Sky is Gray	Student	TV movie
1980-1981	Sanford	Cliff Anderson	Recurring Cast (season 1); Main Cast (season 2)
1982	The Ambush Murders	Lyle Hawkins	TV movie
1983	Hill Street Blues	Kiki Chabundi	2 episodes
1985	Highway to Heaven	Sticks Henderson	1 episode
1985	Alice	Policeman 1	1 episode
1986	What's Happening Now!!	Reverend	1 episode
1990	After the Shock	Neighbor	TV movie
1995-1996	Sliders	Rembrandt Brown #2 / Rembrandt, Duke of Hemmingshire	3 episodes
1996	High Incident		1 episode
1997	The Steve Harvey Show	Doc	1 episode
1999	Introducing Dorothy Dandridge	Phil Moore	TV movie
1999	Any Day Now	Reverend	1 episode
2000	Great Performances	Sweets	1 episode
