= Derrick Wright =

British author of military histories

Derrick Wright (born 1928) is a British author specializing in military history and particularly battles in the Pacific against the Japanese in World War II. He grew up in Teesside, an area in the North East of England, which was repeatedly bombed by German forces during the war. After completing his National Service in the British Army during the late 1940s, he went on to become an ultrasonics engineer. After his retirement, he was able to fully indulge his fascination in World War II. One of his books, The Battle for Iwo Jima, has been translated into Spanish.

== Works ==
- The Battle for Iwo Jima – 1945, Derrick Wright, Sutton Publishing, 2003 ISBN 0-7509-3179-5
- Tarawa 1943: A Hell of a Way to Die
- Tarawa: The Turning of the Tide
- Iwo Jima: The marines raise the flag on Mt Suribachi
- To the Far Side of Hell – the battle for Peleliu, 1944
- Siege at Ma-Kouie, 1959- Robert Hale Ltd.
