= Cleavant Derricks (actor) =

American actor, singer and songwriter (born 1953)

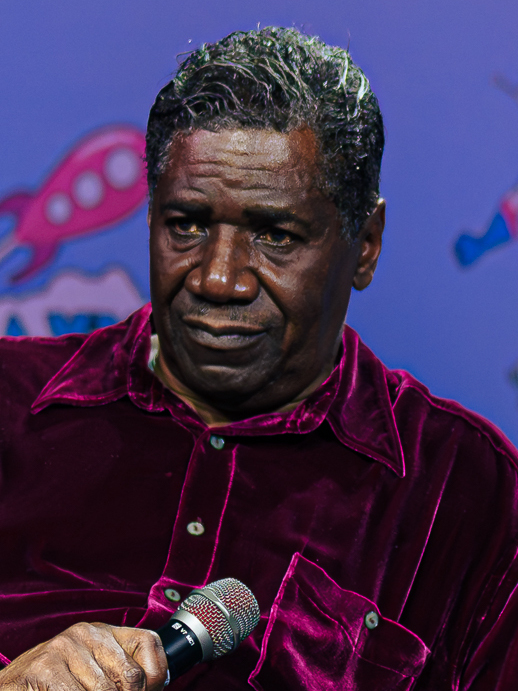
- Derricks at GalaxyCon St. Louis in 2025
- Born: Cleavant Derricks Jr. May 15, 1953 (age 73); Knoxville, Tennessee, United States
- Occupations: Actor, singer, songwriter
- Years active: 1978–present
- Father: Cleavant Derricks
- Relatives: Clinton Derricks-Carroll (twin brother)

Cleavant Derricks Jr. (born May 15, 1953) is an American actor, singer and songwriter, who may be best known for his role of Rembrandt Brown on Sliders.

== Biography ==
Derricks was born in Knoxville, Tennessee, to pianist mother Cecile G. and Baptist preacher/composer Cleavant Derricks Sr., known for his popular gospel music hymn "Just a Little Talk with Jesus". His twin brother is actor and musician Clinton Derricks-Carroll. Derricks began his career as a Nashville gospel songwriter. With his father, he wrote the gospel album Satisfaction Guaranteed. He was the musical director and composer for the musical When Hell Freezes Over I'll Skate.

Derricks went to New York City to study acting with Vinnette Carroll at the Urban Arts Theatre. He received rave reviews for his performance in his Broadway shows, including But Never Jam Today and the 1977 revival of Hair. He also won the Tony Award for Best Featured Actor in a Musical and Drama Desk Award for Outstanding Featured Actor in a Musical, for creating the role of James "Thunder" Early in Dreamgirls. Off-Broadway he was in the William Finn musical Romance in Hard Times in 1989. He also starred in the Broadway musical Brooklyn as the Streetsinger.

Soon afterwards, Derricks appeared in films such as Moscow on the Hudson, Neil Simon's The Slugger's Wife and Wes Craven's Carnival of Souls. He was a series regular on the short-lived television series Thea with Thea Vidale and Brandy, and Good Sports with Farrah Fawcett and Ryan O'Neal. His role as Rembrandt Brown on Sliders with Jerry O'Connell, Sabrina Lloyd and John Rhys-Davies was the only Sliders character to appear throughout the entire series. In addition, Derricks has had numerous guest-starring roles in series such as Roseanne, A Different World, Miami Vice, Spenser: For Hire, Charmed, and many others.

In 2019, Derricks took over the role of the Wizard of Oz in the 2nd U.S. tour of Wicked. He reprised the role in 2022 on Broadway. In summer 2024, he starred as Joe in Waitress at Ogunquit Playhouse.

== Filmography ==
=== Film ===
| Year | Title | Role |
|---|---|---|
| 1981 | Fort Apache the Bronx | Suspect No. 4 |
| 1984 | Moscow on the Hudson | Lionel Witherspoon |
| 1985 | The Slugger's Wife | Manny Alvarado |
| 1986 | Off Beat | Abe Washington |
| 1998 | Carnival of Souls | Sid |
| 2001 | World Traveler | Carl |
| 2008 | Rome & Jewel | Reverend Q |

=== Television ===
| Year | Title | Role | Notes |
|---|---|---|---|
| 1978 | Cindy | Michael Simpson | TV movie |
| 1979 | When Hell Freezes Over, I'll Skate | | TV movie |
| 1982 | The Ambush Murders | | TV movie |
| 1985 | Miami Vice | David Jones | 1 episode |
| 1986 | The Equalizer | Sonny Raines | 2 episodes |
| 1987 | CBS Summer Playhouse | Marvin | Episode: "Mickey and Nora" (S1.E4) |
| 1987 | Bluffing It | Cal | TV movie |
| 1987 | Spenser: For Hire | Mac Dickerson | 1 episode |
| 1987 | Moonlighting | Leonard Haven | 2 episodes |
| 1989 | Roseanne | Tommy | 1 episode |
| 1991 | A Different World | Larry | 1 episode |
| 1991 | L.A. Law | Mark Wright | 1 episode |
| 1991 | Sibs | Officer Milner | 1 episode |
| 1991 | Good Sports | Jeff Mussberger | 15 episodes |
| 1991–1992 | Drexell's Class | George Foster | 17 episodes |
| 1992 | Woops! | Frederick Ross | 11 episodes |
| 1993–1994 | Thea | Charles | 19 episodes |
| 1994–1995 | Something Wilder | Caleb Attucks | 3 episodes |
| 1995–2000 | Sliders | Rembrandt 'Cryin' Man' Brown | 87 episodes |
| 1999 | Touched by an Angel | as Robert Springbelt | 1 episode |
| 2000 | Charmed | Cleavant Wilson | 1 episode |
| 2000 | 18 Wheels of Justice | Harold Baines | 1 episode |
| 2001 | The Practice | Nathan Lees | 1 episode |
| 2002 | The Bernie Mac Show | Willie | 1 episode |
| 2006 | Basilisk: The Serpent King | Col. Douglas | TV movie |
| 2007 | The Wedding Bells | Cedric | 5 episodes |
| 2007 | Cold Case | Lloyd | 1 episode |
| 2011 | Miami Magma | Ray Miller | TV movie |

== Discography ==
- Dreamgirls: Original Broadway Cast Album (1982)
- Beginnings (1999)
- Brooklyn (2004)
