= Derrick Graham =

Derrick Graham may refer to:

- Derrick Graham (American football) (born 1967), American football offensive tackle
- Derrick Graham (politician), American politician in the Kentucky House of Representatives
