= Derrick Starks =

- Born: November 27, 1970 (age 55); Detroit, Michigan
- Genres: gospel, traditional black gospel, urban contemporary gospel
- Occupations: Singer, songwriter, organist
- Instruments: Vocals, singer-songwriter, organ
- Years active: 1994–present
- Labels: Aaron, Crystal Rose
- Formerly of: Today's Generation

Derrick Starks (born November 27, 1970) is an American gospel musician and organist. He started his music career, in 1994, with the release of, Derrick Starks and Today's Generation, that was released by Aaron Records. His second album, He's on Time, was released by Crystal Rose Records in 1999. The third album, Sacrifice, was released in 2001 by Crystal Rose Records. His third album was his breakthrough released upon the Billboard magazine Gospel Albums chart.

== Early life ==
Starks was born on November 27, 1970, in Detroit, Michigan, to father, Reverend C.J. Starks, of Prayer Tabernacle Church, and his homemaker mother, Dorothy. He has four other siblings. His father purchased an organ, at Christmas, and he learned how to play the organ, which facilitated him becoming an organist to further his musical pursuits. Thomas Whitfield used Starks organ-playing acumen at Hartford Memorial Church, which occurred in 1988.

== Music career ==
He formed Today's Generation from members of his church choir in 1991, yet their first album did not release until 1994, with Aaron Records, Derrick Starks and Today's Generation, yet this failed to chart. His second album, He's on Time, was released on June 8, 1999, by Crystal Rose Records, which again this did not chart, and AllMusic rated the album three stars out of five. The third album, Sacrifice, was released by Crystal Rose Records on August 28, 2001, and this charted on the Billboard magazine Top Gospel Albums chart at No. 5. Again AllMusic rated the album three out of five stars.

== Discography ==
List of studio albums, with selected chart positions
Title	Album details	Peak chart positions
Title	Album details	US Gos
Derrick Starks and Today's Generation	Released: 1994; Label: Aaron; CD, digital download	–
He's on Time	Released: June 8, 1999; Label: Crystal Rose; CD, digital download	–
Sacrifice	Released: August 28, 2001; Label: Crystal Rose; CD, digital download	5
