= Derrick Johnson (disambiguation) =

Derrick Johnson (born 1982) is an American former football player who was a linebacker.

Derrick Johnson may also refer to:

- Derrick Johnson (cornerback) (born 1982), American football cornerback
- Derrick Johnson (footballer) (born 1985), Costa Rican association football player
- Derrick Johnson (activist), elected President and CEO of the National Association for the Advancement of Colored People in October 2017

== See also ==
- Derek Johnson (disambiguation)
