= Derrick Shepard =

Derrick Shepard may refer to:

- Derrick Shepard (wide receiver), American football wide receiver
- Derrick Shepard (defensive lineman), American football defensive lineman
