= Darrick =

Darrick is a given name. Notable people with the name include:

- Darrick Brilz (born 1964), former American football offensive lineman
- Darrick Brown (born 1984), American football cornerback
- Darrick Brownlow (born 1968), American football linebacker
- Darrick Doerner, big wave pioneer in the sport of towsurfing
- Darrick Forrest (born 1999), American football player
- Darrick Martin (born 1971), American retired professional basketball player
- Darrick Suber (born c. 1971), American college basketball player
- Darrick Vaughn (born 1978), former American football defensive back

== See also ==
- Derek
- Derrick (name)
