= Derrick Nyeko =

Ugandan politician

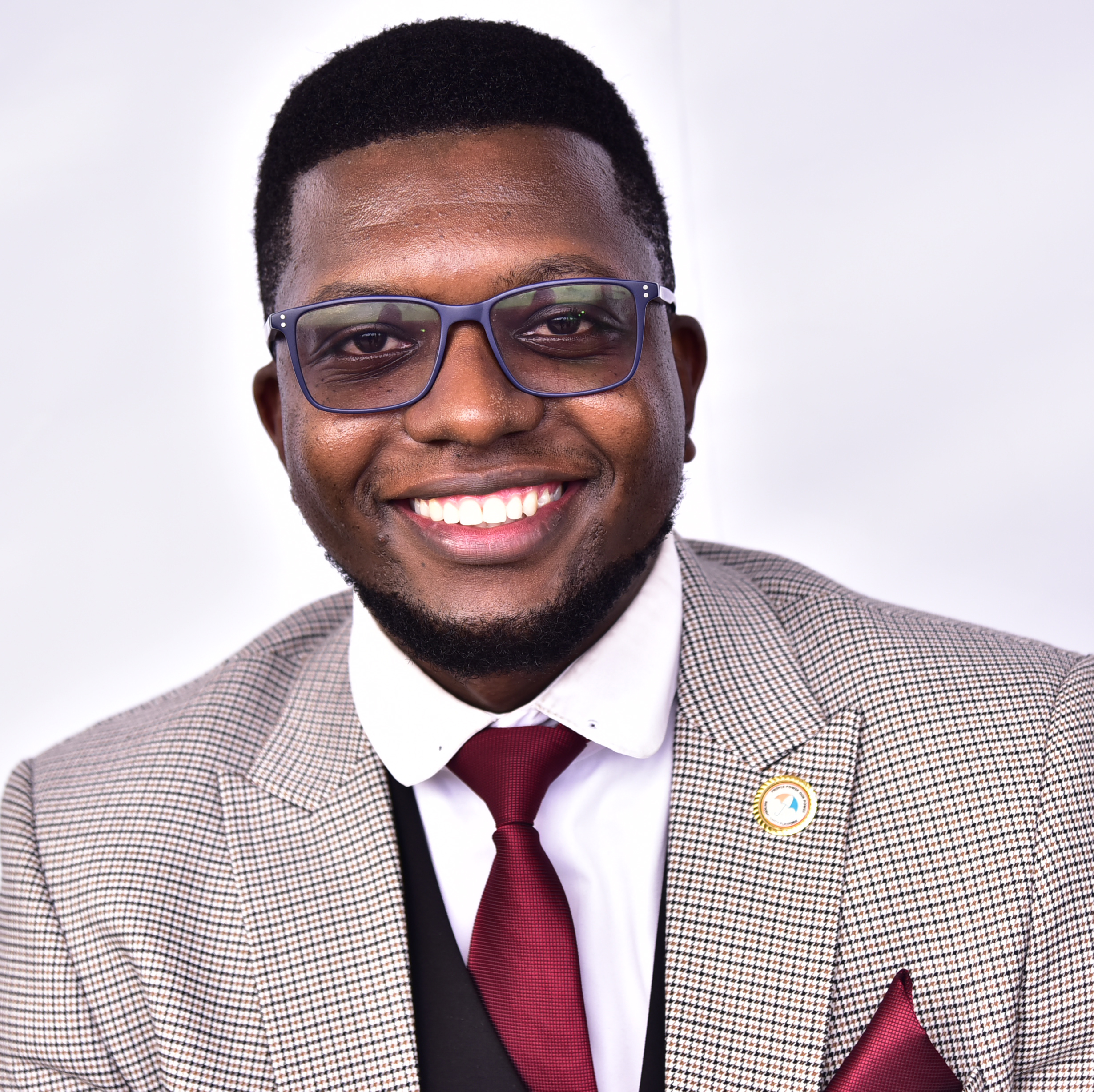
- Nyeko Derrick

Member of the Uganda Parliament for Makindye East, Kampala District
- In office 2021–Present
- Preceded by: Hon. Ibrahim Kasozi

Personal details
- Born: 1992 (age 33–34) Nsambya Hospital, Kampala
- Citizenship: Uganda
- Party: National Unity Platform (NUP)
- Other political affiliations: National Resistance Movement (NRM) Former

Derrick Nyeko Keko (born 1992) is a Ugandan politician, farmer, and former Member of Parliament in Uganda's 11th Parliament (2021-2026), representing Makindye East. He served as the Shadow Minister for Presidency and Security (2021-2024) and Shadow Minister Defence and Veteran Affairs (2024-2026). He is married to Ruth Kirabo Nyeko He is a member of the opposition party, National Unity Platform (NUP) and a supporter of the People Power, Our Power Movement. He was earlier associated with the ruling party National Resistance Movement (NRM).

== Career ==
Nyeko served as the Secretary of Student Affairs in the Uganda Youth Council for Market Zone in 2011. He was later elected as Secretary for Publicity in the same year and worked with the Buganda Youth Council at the parish level. He also served as the Youth Councilor for Makindye Urban Council and also as the NRM Youth Council Publicity Secretary for Kampala, a position that caused controversy as he was seen to belong to two political parties, the ruling NRM and the opposition National Unity Platform (NUP).

Nyeko crossed from National Resistance Movement (NRM) to National Unity Platform (NUP) as a protest against the extension of age limits for presidency which would see president Museveni stay in power for more than 35 years. He then contested for a parliamentary seat for Makindye East and emerged victorious beating the incumbent Hon. Ibrahim Kasozi of FDC, another opposition party.He was then appointed Shadow Minister for Presidency and Security in the Shadow cabinet by the leader of the Uganda opposition Hon. Mathias Mpuuga.

He exited 2026 race amid NUP battles.

== Arrests ==
Nyeko was arrested and released at different occasions during his campaigns for MP, and with the NUP leader Bobi Wine during Bobi's campaigns for presidency and during protests over missing opposition supporters.

== Background and education ==
Nyeko was born at Nsambya Hospital in Kampala in 1992 to Japadhola parents, Mr. Paineto Ofumbi and Mrs. Florence Ofumbi. He grew up in Wabigalo, Namuwongo in Kampala district in a family of six. He studied at Ebenezer Primary School in Wabigalo, St. Peter’s Secondary School Nsambya for his O-Level and St. Mary’s College Lugazi for his A-Level. He then attended Kampala Film School where he graduated with a diploma in Filming.

== See also ==
List of Members of the Eleventh Parliament of Uganda
