= John Derrick (footballer) =

English footballer (1891–1938)

Personal information
- Full name: John Henry Derrick
- Date of birth: 8 December 1891
- Place of birth: Nottingham, England
- Date of death: 22 April 1938 (aged 46)
- Place of death: Nottingham, England
- Height: 5 ft 6 1/2 in (1.69 m)
- Position: Forward

Senior career*
Years	Team	Apps	(Gls)
–1909	Christ Church		
1909–1920	Nottingham Forest	139	(35)
1920–1921	Aberaman		
1921–	Loughborough Corinthians		
1928–1929	Gedling Colliery Welfare		
1929	Nottingham East End Thursday		
- * Club domestic league appearances and goals

John Henry Derrick (8 December 1891 – 22 April 1938) was an English professional footballer who made over 130 appearances as a forward in the Football League for Nottingham Forest.

== Personal life ==
In June 1915, 10 months after the outbreak of the First World War, Derrick enlisted as a private in the Leicestershire Regiment. While serving with the 2nd Battalion of the regiment, he was wounded in Mesopotamia in April 1916. Derrick died following an operation for "gastric trouble" at Nottingham City Hospital in April 1938 and was buried in Wilford Hill Cemetery.

== Career statistics ==
Appearances and goals by club, season and competition
Club	Season	League			FA Cup		Total	
Club	Season	Division	Apps	Goals	Apps	Goals	Apps	Goals
Nottingham Forest	1909–10	First Division	5	4	0	0	5	4
Nottingham Forest	1910–11	First Division	19	6	1	0	20	6
Nottingham Forest	1911–12	Second Division	37	6	1	0	38	6
Nottingham Forest	1912–13	Second Division	25	10	2	1	27	11
Nottingham Forest	1913–14	Second Division	24	8	2	0	26	8
Nottingham Forest	1914–15	Second Division	22	2	1	0	23	2
Nottingham Forest	1919–20	Second Division	7	0	1	0	8	0
Career total			139	35	8	1	147	36
