= Derrick Page =

Cricket player (born 1961)

Personal information
- Full name: Derrick Brooks Keith Page
- Born: 24 May 1961 (age 65); Trelawny, Cornwall County, Jamaica
- Batting: Right-handed
- Bowling: Right-arm fast-medium

Domestic team information
- Years: Team
- 1992: Staffordshire
- 1990: Shropshire

Career statistics
Competition	List A
Matches	2
Runs scored	6
Batting average	6.00
100s/50s	–/–
Top score	6*
Balls bowled	84
Wickets	1
Bowling average	70.00
5 wickets in innings	–
10 wickets in match	–
Best bowling	1/46
Catches/stumpings	–/–
- Source: Cricinfo, 15 June 2011

Derrick Brooks Keith Page (born 24 May 1961) is a Jamaican born former English cricketer. Page was a right-handed batsman who bowled right-arm fast-medium. He was born in Trelawny, Cornwall County.

Page made his debut for Shropshire in the 1990 Minor Counties Championship against Dorset. He played a further match in that season's competition against Buckinghamshire. He played a single List A match for Shropshire in the 1990 NatWest Trophy against Derbyshire. He was dismissed for a duck in this game by Alan Warner, while with the ball he bowled 5 wicket-less overs. Page later joined Staffordshire in 1992, making his debut for the county in the 1992 MCCA Knockout Trophy against Wales Minor Counties. He played Minor counties cricket in just the 1992 season for Staffordshire, making 6 Minor Counties Championship appearances and 3 MCCA Knockout Trophy appearances. Additionally, he also made a single List A appearance for the county in the 1992 NatWest Trophy against Warwickshire. He scored 6 unbeaten runs in the match, while taking the wicket of Andy Moles for the cost of 46 runs from 9 overs.
