= Derrick Jones =

Derrick Jones may refer to:

- Derrick Jones (defensive end) (born 1984), American football defensive end
- Derrick Jones (cornerback) (born 1994), American football cornerback
- Derrick Jones Jr. (born 1997), American basketball player
- Derrick Jones (soccer) (born 1997), American soccer player

== See also ==
- Derek Jones (disambiguation)
