= Albert Derrick (footballer, born 1939) =

Welsh footballer (1939–2022)

Personal information
- Full name: Edward Albert Derrick
- Date of birth: 6 August 1939
- Place of birth: Newport, Wales
- Date of death: 27 June 2022 (aged 82)
- Place of death: Newport, Wales
- Position: Inside forward

Senior career*
| Years | Team | Apps | (Gls) |
| 1960–???? | Newport County | 3 | (1) |
- Merthyr Tydfil
| 1962–1963 | Cambridge City | 49 | (29) |
| 1963–1969 | Hereford United | 108 | (41) |
| 1969–1970 | Newport County | 26 | (8) |
| 1970–1971 | Worcester City | 23 | (1) |
- Barry Town
- Merthyr Tydfil
- * Club domestic league appearances and goals

Edward Albert Derrick (6 August 1939 – 27 June 2022) was a Welsh professional footballer who played as an inside forward in the Southern League for Merthyr Tydfil, Cambridge City, Hereford United and Worcester City. He also played two spells in the Football League for Newport County.

== Personal life ==
Derrick's father Albert was also a footballer. Prior to signing for Newport County in December 1960, he served in the British Army. Derrick developed throat cancer later in life and lost part of his larynx.

== Career statistics ==
Appearances and goals by club, season and competition
| Club | Season | League | | | FA Cup | | Other | | Total | |
| Club | Season | Division | Apps | Goals | Apps | Goals | Apps | Goals | Apps | Goals |
|---|---|---|---|---|---|---|---|---|---|---|
| Hereford United | 1963–64 | Southern League Premier Division | 3 | 1 | ― | | ― | | 3 | 1 |
| Hereford United | 1964–65 | Southern League First Division | 14 | 17 | 1 | | 2 (Note: 1 appearance in Welsh Cup, 1 appearance and 1 goal in Herefordshire Senior Cup) | 1 | 17 | 18 |
| Hereford United | 1965–66 | Southern League Premier Division | 10 | 7 | 3 | | 3 (Note: 2 appearances and 2 goals in Southern League Cup, 1 appearance and 2 goals in Welsh Cup) | 4 | 16 | 11 |
| Hereford United | 1966–67 | Southern League Premier Division | 38 | 8 | 3 | 1 | 7 (Note: 3 appearances and 2 goals in Southern League Cup, 3 appearances in Welsh Cup, 1 appearance in Herefordshire Senior Cup) | 2 | 48 | 11 |
| Hereford United | 1967–68 | Southern League Premier Division | 16 | 4 | 3 | 1 | 7 (Note: 4 appearances and 7 goals in Welsh Cup, 3 appearances in Southern League Cup,) | 7 | 26 | 12 |
| Hereford United | 1968–69 | Southern League Premier Division | 27 | 4 | 3 | 2 | 5 (Note: 4 appearances and 1 goal in Southern League Cup, 1 appearance in Welsh Cup) | 1 | 35 | 7 |
| Career total | | | 108 | 41 | 13 | 4 | 24 | 15 | 145 | 60 |

== Honours ==
Hereford United

- Southern League First Division: 1964–65
- Herefordshire Senior Cup: 1966–67

Individual

- Hereford United Player of the Year: 1968–69
