= Albert Derrick (footballer, born 1908) =

Welsh footballer

Personal information
- Full name: Albert Edward Derrick
- Date of birth: 8 September 1908
- Place of birth: Newport, Wales
- Date of death: 5 June 1975 (aged 66)
- Place of death: Newport, Wales
- Height: 5 ft 7 1/2 in (1.71 m)
- Positions: Centre forward; outside right

Senior career*
Years	Team	Apps	(Gls)
1935–1946	Newport County	125	(43)
1946	Swindon Town	1	(0)
1947	Ebbw Vale		
1947–1948	Caerau Athletic		
- Girlings
- * Club domestic league appearances and goals

Albert Edward Derrick (8 September 1908 – 5 June 1975) was a Welsh professional footballer who made 125 appearances as a forward in the Football League for Newport County. He is a member of the club's Hall of Fame.

== Personal life ==
Derrick was the father of Albert Derrick Jr, who also played football for Newport County. He served in the British Army for seven years, including five on the North-West Frontier.

== Career statistics ==
Appearances and goals by club, season and competition
Club	Season	League			FA Cup		Total	
Club	Season	Division	Apps	Goals	Apps	Goals	Apps	Goals
Swindon Town	1946–47	Third Division South	1	0	0	0	1	0
Career total			1	0	0	0	1	0

== Honours ==
Newport County

- Football League Third Division South: 1938–39

Individual

- Newport County Hall of Fame
