= Thomas Derrick (disambiguation) =

Thomas Derrick was an English executioner c. 1608.

Thomas Derrick may also refer to:

- Tom Derrick (1914–1945), Australian recipient of the Victoria Cross
- Thomas Derrick (artist) (1885–1954), English artist and illustrator
