= Derrick May =

Derrick May is the name of:

- Derrick May (baseball) (born 1968), American baseball player
- Derrick May (musician) (born 1963), American electronic musician

== See also ==
- Derrick Mayes (born 1974), former professional American football player
