= Derrick White (disambiguation) =

Derrick White (born 1994) is an American basketball player.

Derrick White may also refer to:

- Derrick White (baseball) (born 1969), American baseball player
- Derrick White (politician) (1942–2007), writer and political activist from Dublin

== See also ==
- Derek White (disambiguation)
