= Derrick Wyatt =

Legal scholar (born 1948)

Derrick Arthur Wyatt, KC (born 1948) is a legal scholar, retired barrister and retired academic. He was Professor of Law at the University of Oxford from 1996 to 2009 and has been a fellow of St. Edmund Hall since 1978.

== Selected publications ==
- (Co-author) European Union Law (Dashwood and Wyatt's European Union Law; 1st ed., Substantive Law of the EEC, 1980; 2nd ed., ibid., 1987; 3rd ed., European Community Law, 1993; 4th ed., European Union Law, 2000; 5th ed., 2006; 6th ed., 2011).
