= Derrick Lewis (disambiguation) =

Derrick Lewis is an American MMA fighter.

Derrick Lewis may also refer to:

- Derrick Lewis (American football) (born 1975), American football player
- Derrick Lewis (basketball) (born 1966), American basketball player

== See also ==
- Derek Lewis (disambiguation)
