= Derrick Alexander =

Derrick Alexander may refer to:

- Derrick Alexander (wide receiver) (born 1971)
- Derrick Alexander (defensive end) (born 1973)
