= Ted Derrick =

Australian rules footballer

Personal information
- Full name: Edward John Derrick
- Born: 14 May 1894; Kew, Victoria
- Died: 13 October 1969 (aged 75); Rosebud, Victoria
- Original team: Richmond Districts

Playing career^{1}
Years	Club	Games (Goals)
1916	Richmond	9 (6)
- ^{1} Playing statistics correct to the end of 1916.

Edward John Derrick (14 May 1894 – 13 October 1969) was an Australian rules footballer who played with Richmond in the Victorian Football League (VFL).
