= Derrick Spencer =

South African soccer player

Personal information
- Full name: Derrick Spencer
- Date of birth: 10 May 1982 (age 44)
- Place of birth: Durban, South Africa
- Positions: Defender; midfielder

Team information
- Current team: Bidvest Wits
- Number: 20

Youth career
- Newtons
- Santos

Senior career*
Years	Team	Apps	(Gls)
2002–2003	Maritzburg City	?	(?)
2003–2004	Hellenic	?	(?)
2004–2008	Kaizer Chiefs	?	(?)
2008–2010	Mamelodi Sundowns	?	(?)
2010–2011	Platinum Stars	?	(?)
2011	→ Bidvest Wits (loan)	?	(?)
2011–	Bidvest Wits	0	(0)
- * Club domestic league appearances and goals as of 23 July 2011 ‡ National team caps and goals as of 23 July 2011

Derrick Spencer (born 10 May 1982 in Durban, KwaZulu-Natal) is a South African football (soccer) player who plays as a defender or midfielder for Bidvest Wits in the Premier Soccer League.

Through his foundation, Spencer established an annual football festival for local KwaZulu school teams.
