= Derrick Clark (footballer) =

English footballer (1935–1985)

Personal information
- Full name: Derrick Bryan Clark
- Date of birth: 27 December 1935
- Place of birth: Leyburn, Yorkshire, England
- Date of death: 1985 (Note: Clark's death was registered in the second quarter of 1985, in the Central Cleveland registration district, which covers Middlesbrough and surrounding area.) (aged 49)
- Place of death: Central Cleveland, Yorkshire, England
- Position: Forward

Senior career*
Years	Team	Apps	(Gls)
1955–1956	Darlington	5	(1)
- * Club domestic league appearances and goals

Derrick Bryan Clark (27 December 1935 – 1985) was an English footballer who made five appearances in the Football League playing as a forward for Darlington.
