= Albert Derrick (philatelist) =

Australian philatelist

Albert James Derrick (25 August 1862 – 23 December 1931) was an Australian philatelist who signed the Roll of Distinguished Philatelists in 1928.
