= Derrick Moore =

Derrick Moore may refer to:

- Derrick Moore (running back) (born 1967), former American football player; running back for the Atlanta Falcons, Detroit Lions, Arizona Cardinals, and Carolina Panthers
- Derrick Moore (defensive end) (born 2002), American football player; defensive end for the Detroit Lions

== See also ==
- Derek W. Moore (1931–2008), British mathematician
- Derek Moore-Brabazon, 2nd Baron Brabazon of Tara (1910–1974), British peer
