= Derrick Orone =

Ugandan politician

Orone Derrick Honorable
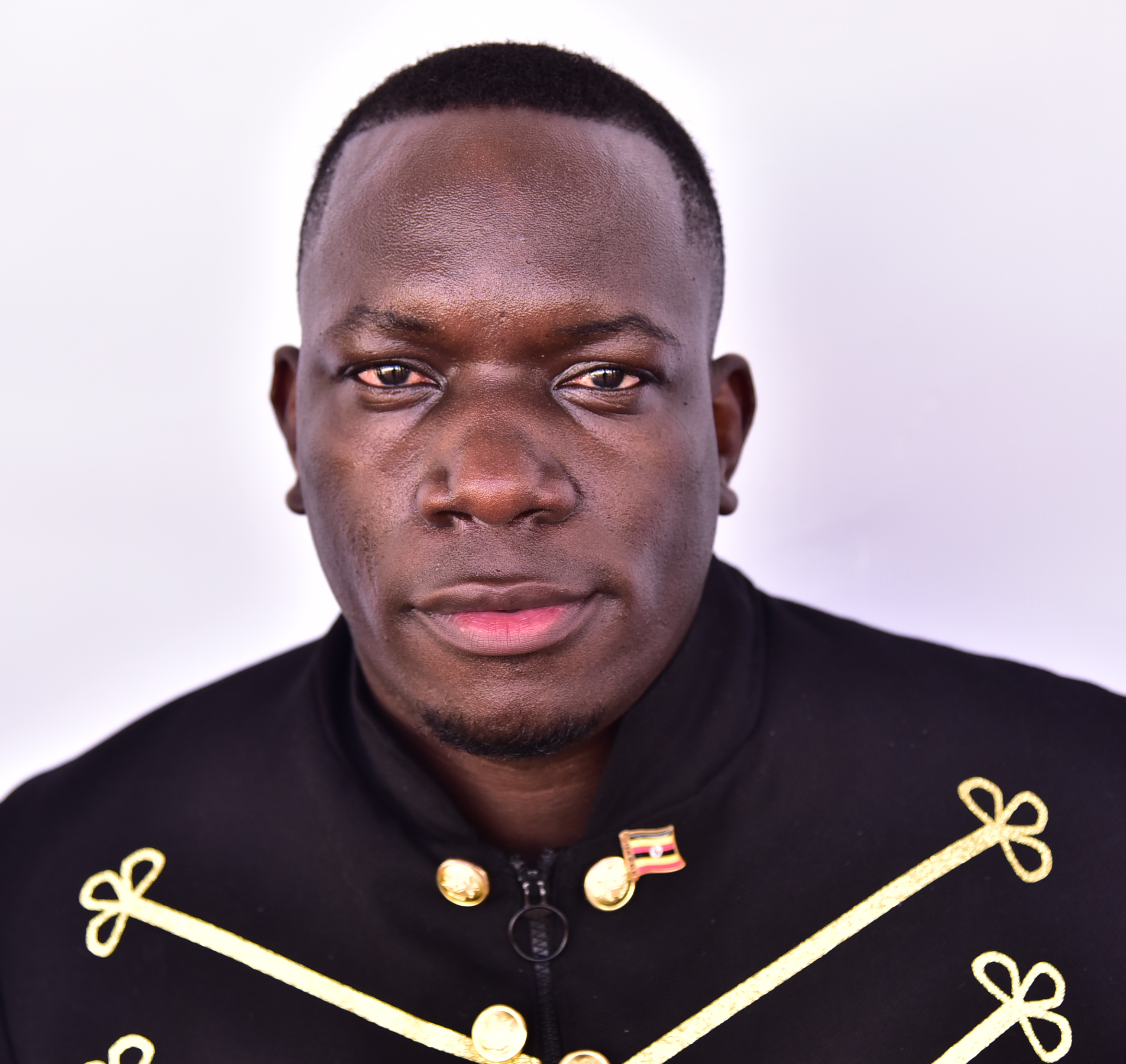
- Derrick Orone

Member of Parliament for Gogonyo Constituency Pallisa District
- Incumbent
- Assumed office May 21, 2021

Personal details
- Born: 22 January 1988 (age 38) Pallisa District
- Party: National Resistance Movement
- Education: St. Lawrence University (Bachelor's degree in Public Administration)
- Occupation: Politician, Public administrator
- Known for: Politics, Public Administration, leadership

Orone Derrick is a Ugandan politician who serves as a Member of Parliament representing Gogonyo Constituency Pallisa District. He was elected on 14 January 2021. He is a member of National Resistance Movement political party. He serves as a member on the Appointments Committee in the Parliament of Uganda.

== Early life and education background ==
Orone was born on 22 January 1988 in Pallisa District. He attended Merryland High School Entebbe for both his 0 & A levels (2001–2007). He graduated with a bachelor's degree in Public Administration from St. Lawrence University in 2019.

== Career ==
=== Working experience ===
He has worked at Maghrib agencies as director operations from 2009 to 2017. He is the CEO of Rokas Recruitment Services Limited a recruitment agency as well as the CEO of Rydim Empire a Music Events Company which does Artiste music management and Events.

=== Politics ===
In January 2021, he was elected as a Member of Parliament representing Gogonyo Constituency Pallisa District in the eleventh Parliament of Uganda (2021 to 2026) in the 2021 Ugandan general election and on 21 May 2021 he sworn in as the Member of Parliament.

== Personal life ==
Orone Derrick belongs to National Resistance Movement.

== External references ==
- Website of the Parliament of Uganda.
- Manager Derrick in a bitter fight with Grenade Official
- Manager Derrick Terminates Grenade Official's Music Contract Accusing Him Of Indiscipline And Disrespect. - HOT100 Kampala
- NRM Wins the Highest National Seat and The Greatest Number of Legislators In 11th Parliament
- 2021 Elections: Statistics on the number of MPs who have been declared winners so far
- General parliamentary elections, 2021 - Election results
