= Derrick Leon =

British writer (1908–1944)

Derrick Lewis Leon (1908–1944) was a British author, who was born in London in 1908, and died of tuberculosis in November 1944, aged 36, shortly after completing the first draft of his biography of John Ruskin (Ruskin: The Great Victorian), published by Routledge & Kegan Paul in 1949.

Leon made his living as an interior decorator, but by the time of his death, he had earned himself a reputation as a fine biographer, with works on Leo Tolstoy and Marcel Proust. Leon had also published three novels before his death. The first one, Livingstones; A Novel of Contemporary Life was published in 1933; Wilderness was published in 1935; and Green for a Season was published in 1938.

His biography of Ruskin cast new light on John Ruskin's personal tragedies, in particular his "harrowing obsession" with Rose La Touche, as well as his public life and his work. After Leon's death, his biography of Ruskin was subjected to a quotation check and grammatical corrections by George Leon, his brother, who was a quantity-surveyor by profession.
