= Derrick Evans =

Derrick Evans may refer to:

- Derrick Evans (politician) (born 1985), West Virginia politician
- Derrick Evans (fitness instructor) (born 1952), Jamaican-born British fitness instructor

== See also ==
- Derek Evans (disambiguation)
