= Derrick Gragg =

American college athletics administrator (born 1969)

Current position
- Title: Vice President for Athletic Strategy
- Team: Northwestern
- Conference: Big Ten

Biographical details
- Born: November 16, 1969 (age 56); Huntsville, Alabama, U.S.
- Education: Vanderbilt (BS, 1992); Wayne State (MA, 1999); Arkansas (PhD, 2004)

Playing career
- 1988–1991: Vanderbilt
- Position: Wide receiver

Administrative career (AD unless noted)
- 1993–1995: Vanderbilt (dir. student life)
- 1995–1997: Missouri (dir. compliance)
- 1997–2000: Michigan (assistant AD)
- 2000–2006: Arkansas (senior associate AD)
- 2006–2013: Eastern Michigan
- 2013–2021: Tulsa
- 2021–2024: Northwestern
- 2024 -: Northwestern (VP for Athletic Strategy)

Derrick Gragg (born November 16, 1969) is an American college athletics administrator. He was the athletic director at Northwestern University, a position he has held from 2021 to 2024, before being moved to the position of Vice President for Athletic Strategy. He previously spent eight years, 2013 to 2021, as the athletic director at the University of Tulsa, seven years, 2006 to 2013, as the athletic director at Eastern Michigan University, six years, 2000 to 2006, as senior associate athletic director at the University of Arkansas. Gragg played college football at Vanderbilt University, lettering as a wide receiver for the Commodores for four seasons, 1988 to 1991.

== Early life, education and NCAA football ==
Gragg was born and raised in Huntsville, Alabama, where he played football and basketball at Lee High School. He attended Vanderbilt University in Nashville, Tennessee, and played wide receiver for the Vanderbilt Commodores football team from 1988 to 1991. He was recruited and played for head coach Watson Brown, before Gerry DiNardo took over as head coach his senior season.

Gragg graduated from Vanderbilt in 1992 with a Bachelor of Science in human development. He went on to earn a master's degree in sports administration from Wayne State University in 1999, and a doctorate (Ed.D) in higher education administration at the University of Arkansas in 2004. He is a member of Kappa Alpha Psi fraternity.

== Career ==
=== Early academic career (1993–2006) ===
In 1993, Gragg was hired as an academic counselor at Vanderbilt University. Soon after he was promoted to director of student life in the athletics department. From 1995 to 1997, he was director of compliance at the University of Missouri. He went on to the University of Michigan, where he was an assistant athletic director from 1997 to 2000. Gragg joined the University of Arkansas athletic department in 2000 as an associate athletic director. In 2003, he was promoted to senior associate athletic director and then deputy director.

=== Eastern Michigan (2006–13) ===
On February 21, 2006, Gragg was named the new director of athletics at Eastern Michigan University in Ypsilanti, Michigan. At EMU, Gragg was responsible for an intercollegiate athletic program with 21 teams, 550 student-athletes and 80 staff members. Under his leadership, the Eastern Michigan Eagles totaled 24 Mid-American Conference team championships, 32 MAC Coach of the Year awards, 38 MAC Player of the Year honors and 164 individual MAC champions. Gragg also spearheaded construction of EMU's $3.9 million multipurpose indoor athletic practice facility.

In March 2013, it was announced that Gragg would leave Eastern Michigan University for Tulsa University. His seven years as EMU athletic director was the longest tenure since Gene Smith oversaw the department from 1986 to 1993.

=== Tulsa (2013–2021) ===
On March 22, 2013, Gragg was officially introduced as the new vice president and athletic director at the University of Tulsa in Tulsa, Oklahoma. He was the first Vanderbilt Commodore football alumnus to become athletic director of a major NCAA Division I university.

Following a 10-year tenure in C-USA, the Golden Hurricane were upgraded to the American Athletic Conference (AAC) in 2014, shortly after Gragg's arrival. They won four AAC championships in the 2014 season, including conference titles in men's and women's cross country and men's soccer. In the 2013–14 season, the Tulsa basketball team won 11 games in a row and earned its first NCAA tournament bid since 2003. They made the tournament again in 2016, losing in the first round both times.

Over the course of his career, Gragg has been a presenter and panelist at events including the NCAA Presidential Summit, Future Coaches Academy, Champions for athletic director and Football Coaches, and the NCAA Annual Convention. He is a member of the National Association of Collegiate Directors of Athletics and the Black Coaches & Administrators.

=== Northwestern (2021–present) ===
On June 4, 2021, Gragg was named the new athletic director at Northwestern University in Evanston, Illinois. Gragg assumed his position as the Combe Family Vice President for Athletics & Recreation on July 1, 2021. On June 13, 2024, Gragg was moved to the position of Vice President for Athletic Strategy.

== Book ==
In October 2015, Gragg's book 40 Days of Direction: Life Lessons From the Talented Ten was published. It relates the personal experiences of Gragg and 10 of his Commodore football teammates as African American student-athletes on the predominantly white campus of Vanderbilt University, and demonstrates how those experiences would shape their personal and professional lives, offering a blueprint for success.

== Honors and awards ==
- Black Coaches & Administrators Administrator of the Year, 2008–09
- Huntsville-Madison County (Ala.) Athletic Hall of Fame, 2010

== Bibliography ==
- Factors that Positively Affect Academic Performance of African-American Football Student-Athletes Who Graduate From Southeastern Conference Institutions (University of Arkansas, Fayetteville, 2004)
- 40 Days of Direction: Life Lessons From the Talented Ten (3G Publishing, 2015)
