= Derrick Lonsdale =

British-born American pediatrician (1924–2024)

Derrick Lonsdale (April 22, 1924 – May 2, 2024) was a British-born American pediatrician and researcher into the benefits of certain nutrients in preventing disease and psychotic behavior. He was a Fellow of the American College of Nutrition (FACN), and also a Fellow of the American College for Advancement in Medicine (FACAM).

Lonsdale is known for his research into thiamine and his controversial theory that thiamine deficiency is widespread among Americans and predictive of anti-social behavior.

== Positions ==
Lonsdale was a practitioner in pediatrics at the Cleveland Clinic for 20 years. He became Head of the Section of Biochemical Genetics at the Clinic.

In 1982, Lonsdale retired from the Cleveland Clinic and joined the Preventive Medicine Group to specialize in nutrient-based therapy.

Lonsdale was also on the Scientific Research Advisory Committee of the American College for Advancement in Medicine and was an editor of their Journal.

== Research work ==
Lonsdale hypothesized that healing comes from the body itself rather than from external medical interventions.

Lonsdale studied the use of nutrients to prevent diseases. He was particularly interested in Vitamin B_{1}, also known as thiamine. The World Health Organization have cited three of Lonsdale's thiamine deficiency papers on Sudden Infant Death Syndrome.

Lonsdale spoke at orthomolecular medicine conferences.

=== Autism ===
Lonsdale led an uncontrolled study on the treatment of autistic children with thiamine. He also led a study (uncontrolled) of secretin, which he and Shamberger say led to an improvement in behaviour and bowel control of autistic children in his study. Both of these studies are controversial because they link nutrition with autism.

Analysing the findings in the latter study, autism researchers say that while secretin may have "affect[ed] gastrointestinal function, [which] may have influenced bowel function that in turn limited the discomfort children feel, but this does not constitute a substantial behavioural change".

=== Child violence ===
In 2002 Lonsdale caused controversy when he linked child violence (children killing other children) to dietary deficiencies rather than the accepted social causes. Lonsdale put this down to 'high calorie malnutrition' where children overeat high calories foods that lack vital nutrients resulting in an upset to 'brain balance'. He pointed the finger at a range of 'normal' foods as well as generally accepted junk foods.

== Personal life and death ==
Lonsdale was born on April 22, 1924, in The Fylde, Lancashire, England, to Edward and Kate Lonsdale. He turned 100 on April 22, 2024, and died in Cleveland, Ohio, on May 2, 2024.

== Books ==
Lonsdale has written several books, including:

- A Nutritionist's Guide to the Clinical use of Vitamin B-1.
- Why I Left Orthodox Medicine: Healing for the 21st Century
- Free Oxygen Radicals and Disease
- A Nutritional Approach to a Revised Model for Medicine: Is Modern Medicine Helping You?
- Thiamine Deficiency Disease, Dysautonomia, and High Calorie Malnutrition

== See also ==
- Alternative medicine
- Autism
- Cleveland Clinic
- Thiamine
