= Derrick America =

South African politician

Member of the National Assembly of South Africa
- In office 21 May 2014 – 7 May 2019

Member of the Western Cape Provincial Parliament
- In office 22 May 2019 – 28 May 2024

Personal details
- Party: Democratic Alliance
- Spouse: Carina America (m.1986)
- Children: 2
- Education: University of the Western Cape; Curtin University of Technology
- Occupation: Politician
- Profession: Academic

Derrick America is a South African politician who is currently serving as a member of the mayoral committee of the Drakenstein Local Municipality. America previously served as a City of Cape Town councillor, a Member of the National Assembly of South Africa and a Member of the Western Cape Provincial Parliament.

== Early life and career ==
In high school, America was a vocal opponent of apartheid and organised student protests. He first started work at the South African Post Office, where he had a confrontation with management about the apartheid system in place for employees. America was then educated at the University of the Western Cape where he received a Bachelor of Commerce with Honours. His area of study focused on management and the labour market. He subsequently completed a Master of Business Administration at the Curtin University in Perth, Western Australia. America then worked as a school teacher, teaching business economics and accounting. He then served as an academic at Cape Peninsula University of Technology until 2009, lecturing in labour law and business courses. America also arbitrated on labour disputes at the Commission for Concilliation Mediation and Arbitration from 2009 to 2011.

== Political career ==
America was first elected as a Councillor in the City of Cape Town in May 2011. He represented residents of Kensington, Factreton, Maitland until 2014. He was elected as a Member of the National Assembly of South Africa in May 2014, representing the Democratic Alliance. He was elected to the Western Cape Provincial Parliament in 2019.

Derrick left the Provincial Parliament at the general election on 29 May 2024 as he did not make himself available for re-election. Shortly afterwards, he was sworn in as a DA councillor in the Drakenstein Local Municipality whereafter he was appointed by mayor Stephen Korabie to serve as a member of the mayoral committee; he leads the corporate and governance portfolio.
