= Ron Derrick =

Australian rules footballer

Personal information
- Full name: Ron Derrick
- Born: 17 February 1933 (age 93)
- Original team: Camden
- Height: 180 cm (5 ft 11 in)
- Weight: 76 kg (168 lb)

Playing career^{1}
Years	Club	Games (Goals)
1954–55	St Kilda	3 (0)
- ^{1} Playing statistics correct to the end of 1955.

Ron Derrick (born 17 February 1933) is a former Australian rules footballer who played with St Kilda in the Victorian Football League (VFL).
