= Michael Derrick (disambiguation) =

Michael Derrick (1915–1961) was a Catholic journalist.

Michael Derrick may also refer to:

- Mike Derrick (baseball) (1943–2009), Major League Baseball player for the Boston Red Sox
- Mikel Derrick (1952–1990), convicted murderer executed in the U.S. state of Texas
- Mike Derrick (politician), candidate for U.S. Congress in New York's 21st congressional district

== See also ==
- Michael Derrick Hudson (born 1963), American poet and librarian
