= Derrick Ndzimande =

South African gospel musician and pastor

- Born: March 30, 1954 (age 71); Vermont Farm, Transvaal, South Africa
- Origin: Belfast, Mpumalanga, South Africa
- Occupation(s): Singer, pastor, music producer, former teacher
- Years active: 1980s–present

Derrick Ndzimande (born c. 30 March 1954) is a South African gospel singer, pastor, music producer and former educator. He gained prominence in the 1980s and 1990s in Pentecostal and charismatic church circles across South Africa and neighbouring countries. Ndzimande is known for a distinctive deep falsetto–baritone voice and a long recording career that includes both studio albums and live recordings.

== Life and history ==
Several published profiles report that Derrick Ndzimande was born on 30 March 1954 at Vermont Farm near Lydenburg (now Mashishing) in Transvaal (now Mpumalanga), South Africa, and that his family later moved to Belfast in 1966. He trained and worked as a teacher and is reported to have served as principal at Blomplaas Primary School before focusing full-time on ministry and music.

Ndzimande emerged as a popular gospel singer during the late 1980s and 1990s. He has released numerous albums, including "Nangu UJesu", "Udlalelani Na?", "Greatest Hits" compilations and "Halala NgoJesu" (2002).

== Partial discography ==
- Nangu UJesu (1998).
- Greatest Hits, Vol. 1 (1999).
- Halala NgoJesu (2002).
- Ubusisiwe (2007).
