= Derrick Moss =

Derrick Moss may refer to:

- Derrick Moss, musician in The Soul Rebels
- Derrick Moss, character in Dark Matter (TV series)
- Derrick Moss (indoor football) in 2013 Dayton Sharks season
