= Just a Little Talk with Jesus =

1937 gospel hymn by Cleavant Derricks

"Just a Little Talk with Jesus (also known as "I Once was Lost in Sin but Jesus took Me In")"

Song

from the album song book = Harbor Bells No. 6
- Published: January 1, 1937 by Stamps-Baxter Music Company, Dallas, Texas, renewed January 2, 1964 administrated by Brentwood-Benson Music Publishing Inc., Brentwood, Tennessee.
- Genre: gospel music
- Songwriter: Cleavant Derricks

"Just a Little Talk with Jesus" is a gospel music song published by Stamps-Baxter Music Company on January 1, 1937, written by Cleavant Derricks. In 1936, he sold the song to Stamps-Baxter in exchange for fifty songbooks, which he then sold for ten cents each.

It has been recorded by many notable artists, including The Fairfield Four., Elvis Presley, The Stanley Brothers, Nina Hagen and others. In 2005, Keith Lancaster arranged the song as "It's All Right."
