= Cleavant Derricks (songwriter) =

American pastor, choir director (1910–1977)

Cleavant Derricks Sr.
- Born: May 13, 1910; Chattanooga, Tennessee, U.S
- Died: April 14, 1977 (aged 67); Nashville, Tennessee, U.S

Cleavant Derricks Sr. (May 13, 1910 – April 14, 1977) was a pastor, songwriter and choir director at a number of black Baptist churches. Among his more famous songs are the much-recorded and performed "Just a Little Talk with Jesus," "When God Dipped His Love In My Heart," "We'll Soon Be Done With Troubles and Trials," and "When He Blessed My Soul."

== Biography ==
=== Early life and education ===
Derricks was born at East Chattanooga, Tennessee, second of five children of stove-factory moulder John T. Derricks and Ora Mae, née Kinamore, who worked as a domestic servant for a family in Chattanooga. He studied at Cadek Conservatory of Music in Chattanooga, A & I State University and American Baptist Theological Seminary in Nashville.

=== Career ===
Derricks had been a warrant officer in the United States Army, having enlisted in 1942. His term of service ended October 1945.

At age 21, Derricks directed a gospel choir of more than 100 voices in Washington, D.C. at the Vermont Avenue Baptist Church. Derricks counted among his friends many well-known artists, one of whom was Mahalia Jackson.

He was the pastor at churches throughout Tennessee at Dayton, Knoxville and Jackson; also in Beloit, Wisconsin and Washington, D.C. Along with being a pastor, Derricks was a church builder, choir director, poet, musician, and composer of note, having written more than 300 songs and several song books.

Among his more famous songs are the much-recorded and performed "Just a Little Talk with Jesus," "When God Dipped His Love In My Heart," "We'll Soon Be Done With Troubles and Trials," and "When He Blessed My Soul." He was inducted into the Gospel Music Hall of Fame in 1984.

== Personal life ==
On May 31, 1935, Derricks married Cecile, daughter of Ben F. Gay and Eugenia Gay, in Chattanooga. They lived in Washington, D.C., then Chattanooga, followed by Knoxville, Tennessee, where, having separated from his first wife after a few years, he married secondly Carrie Louise (1919-2005), daughter of Horace and Lovie Glanton. Their twin sons are actors Cleavant Derricks Jr. and Clinton Derricks-Carroll; they also had a daughter, Lovie Gwendoline. Derricks died 14 April, 1977, from colon cancer, and was buried at New Gray Cemetery in Knoxville.
