= Harvey Mason Jr. =

American producer and songwriter (born 1968)

- Mason in 2026

Background information
- Born: Harvey Jay Mason; June 3, 1968 (age 58); Boston, Massachusetts, U.S.
- Origin: Los Angeles, California, U.S.
- Genres: Pop; jazz; soul; R&B
- Occupations: Record producer; songwriter; film producer
- Years active: 1976–present
- Formerly of: The Underdogs
- Spouses: Britt Burton (m. 2020)
- Title: CEO, the Recording Academy & MusiCares; Founder/CEO, Harvey Mason Media
- Children: 2
- Father: Harvey Mason
- Website: harveymasonmedia.com grammy.com

Harvey Mason Jr. (born Harvey Jay Mason; June 3, 1968) is an American record producer, songwriter and film producer who has been chief executive officer (CEO) of the Recording Academy and MusiCares since 2021. From both his solo work and as part of the production duo the Underdogs, he has been credited on releases for artists including Aretha Franklin, Michael Jackson, Beyoncé, Whitney Houston, Justin Bieber, and Ariana Grande. He has also produced music for films including Michael, Bob Marley: One Love, Dreamgirls, Pitch Perfect (1,2,3), Respect, SING (1,2,3), and Straight Outta Compton, among many others.

== Early life ==
Mason was born on June 3, 1968, in Boston, Massachusetts, to Harvey Mason Sr., a jazz drummer and Sally Mason, both of whom attended Boston's Berklee College of Music. As a child, Harvey moved with his family to Los Angeles and followed his father to many recording sessions with such musicians as Quincy Jones, the Brothers Johnson and Herbie Hancock. Mason penned his first song at the age of eight for Grover Washington Jr. titled "Love Makes It Better".

After attending the University of Arizona on a basketball scholarship from 1986 to 1990 and playing in the 1988 Final Four, he began working as a songwriter/record producer. Some early work included tracks for British pop artist Michelle Gayle's album "Sensational" in 1997 and the jazz/soul duo Imprompt2. mason co-produced the jazz album "Ratamacue" with his father in 1997. He also worked with Mason Sr.'s group Fourplay, In 1998 he produced the track called "Sexual Healing" featuring El DeBarge in 1998.

In 1997, Mason also penned the track "Truthfully" which caught the attention of record producer Rodney Jerkins. It was produced for Brandy's 1998 album "Never Say Never". Mason then worked with Jerkins over the next three years on projects including "Say My Name" by Destiny's Child, "It's Not Right, But It's Okay" by Whitney Houston, and "He Wasn't Man Enough" by Toni Braxton. He also worked on the album Invincible by Michael Jackson.

== Early career ==
In 2000, Mason co-wrote the track "I Like Them Girls" with Damon Thomas for Tyrese's album 2000 Watts. The success of the song led to a partnership and the formation of Underdog Entertainment. The Underdogs produced R&B and pop hits such "How You Gonna Act Like That" also by the singer, as well as "Gots Ta Be" by B2K, "O" by Omarion, "More To Life" by Stacie Orrico, "Sorry 2004" by Ruben Studdard, and "No Air" by Jordin Sparks and Chris Brown. In 2001, he collaborated with British designer and former member of the Spice Girls Victoria Beckham on her self-titled debut album. In 2004, The Underdogs signed a record deal with BMG under Clive Davis and created Underdog Music Publishing, a joint venture with Rondor/ Universal Music.

In 2006, the Underdogs produced the soundtrack to the film Dreamgirls, which won the Critic's Choice Award in 2007 for Best Movie Soundtrack. After a three-year hiatus, the Underdogs reunited in 2011 to produce the song "Up 2 You" for Chris Brown's album F.A.M.E.. The Underdogs wrote and produced the song "The Living Proof", performed by Mary J. Blige for the film "The Help". The duo then produced Brown's single "Turn Up the Music", from his album Fortune. In 2012, the Underdogs produced the vocals for the film Pitch Perfect, starring Anna Kendrick and Brittany Snow. In 2014, he produced South Korean girl group Girls' Generation's single "Mr. Mr." and their labelmate Exo's single "Overdose", as well as the music for the James Brown biopic Get on Up. In 2015, the Underdogs produced the music for the sequel to Pitch Perfect, Pitch Perfect 2, and the highly acclaimed Straight Outta Compton.

== Career ==
Mason formed his namesake media company in 2008. It encompasses his film and record productions, music publishing, and website ventures. Record productions include the 2008 releases of Chris Brown's "Superhuman" (from his album Exclusive), Britney Spears' "Mannequin" (from her album Circus) and Jennifer Hudson's "You Pulled Me Through" (from her self-titled debut album). Alongside Tricky Stewart and Stargate, respectively, Mason produced the title track and a cover of "Song for You" for Whitney Houston's 2009 album, I Look to You. In 2010, Mason produced the cover version of "One Shining Moment" featuring Jennifer Hudson for CBS Sports' Final Four. Mason produced and was A&R on Toni Braxton's Pulse. In 2011, Mason produced the single "Where You At" along with R. Kelly for Jennifer Hudson's album I Remember Me.

Harvey Mason Media produced its first feature film, the LeBron James biopic More than a Game in 2008. The film documents the rise of James and his high school teammates, from their early AAU basketball days to the high school national championship stage. It premiered at the Toronto International Film Festival in 2008, where it won first runner-up to best film, Slumdog Millionaire. Lions Gate Films distributed the film, which was released in September 2008. Harvey Mason Media, in tandem with Polow da Don's Zone 4 and Interscope Records, produced the accompanying soundtrack album, Music Inspired by More Than a Game, which was supported by Drake, Lil Wayne, Kanye West and Eminem's collaborative single, "Forever". The film was also nominated for Best Documentary at the 2010 NAACP Image Awards and the Independent Spirit Awards.

Mason appeared on the 2011 season of American Idol as a mentor/producer, working with Pia Toscano and Jacob Lusk, and did so for the 2013 season of The X Factor USA. He has also made numerous appearances on the reality series Braxton Family Values on the We TV network, which starred his collaborators Toni and Tamar Braxton.

In 2012, Mason was the last producer to work with Whitney Houston on her songs "His Eye Is on the Sparrow" and "Celebrate", both for the film Sparkle.

Following the success of Pitch Perfect 2, Get On Up, and Straight Outta Compton, Mason was music producer for the NBC broadcast of The Wiz Live!, which aired on December 3, 2015. He also produced over 50 songs for the animated musical SING by Universal/Illumination Entertainment, which was released on December 3, 2016. The film received two Golden Globe Awards nominations for Best Animated Feature Film and Best Original Song for the song "Faith", produced by Mason and performed by Stevie Wonder and Ariana Grande.

In 2017, Mason was executive musical producer for Pitch Perfect 3 – the final installment of the Universal Pictures series, as well as the musical reworking of the 1980s classic Valley Girl for MGM, and USA Network's Unsolved, a scripted true crime series based on the murder investigations of Tupac Shakur and Notorious B.I.G. Furthermore, Mason also helmed a similar role, as well as composer on Anthony Mandler's feature debut Monster which was nominated for the 2018 Grand Jury Prize at Sundance.

In March 2018, Billboard announced that Mason joined the advisory board of Tunedly, an online recording studio for songwriters.

Mason produced the music for NBC's Jesus Christ Superstar Live in Concert!, which aired on April 1, 2018, as well as Bad Times at the El Royale for 20th Century Fox, directed by Drew Goddard. In 2023, Mason produced MGM biopic Respect, starring Jennifer Hudson as Aretha Franklin. He was also one of several songwriters on the 2023 family film, Miraculous: Ladybug & Cat Noir, The Movie, which released on Netflix in most territories.

== Recording Academy ==
Mason was elected to the board of the directors for the Los Angeles chapter of The Recording Academy (National Academy of Record Arts and Sciences) in 2007 and the National Board of Trustees in 2009. Mason was Recording Academy Chairman and worked with CEO Deborah Dugan until Dugan was relieved of her duties and placed on administrative leave on January 16, 2020, accused of bullying her assistant, whom she inherited from her predecessor, Neil Portnow. (The assistant took a leave of absence.) In response, Dugan made claims that the organization was complicit in corruption, citing "voting irregularities, financial mismanagement, 'exorbitant and unnecessary' legal bills, and conflicts of interest involving members of the academy's board, executive committee and outside lawyers". On March 2, 2020, the Academy announced that it had officially fired Dugan. A letter was sent to its members informing them of the action taken by its board of trustees. The organization also tightened their conflict of interest rules that June.

In April 2021, the Recording Academy eliminated its secret voting committees that had existed for 28 years. Mason assumed the chief executive officer role of the Recording Academy, on May 13, 2021. By the end of June, the Academy had settled with Dugan for an undisclosed amount.

=== Grammy Foundation ===
Mason has participated in Grammy Foundation events including Grammy in the Schools, Grammy Camp and the MusiCares Foundation. Mason is the Chairperson of the National Advocacy Committee and Executive Co-chair of the Producers and Engineers Wing.

== Basketball ==
Mason played basketball throughout high school and college. As a guard on the Crescenta Valley High School team in La Crescenta, California he was selected to the All-CIF (California Interscholastic Federation) team in 1984, 1985 and 1986. He received a full-scholarship to the University of Arizona and played for Hall of Fame coach, Lute Olson. Mason's teams won the Pac-10 title in 1988, 1989 and 1990 and played in the Final Four in 1988. Notable teammates include Steve Kerr (Chicago Bulls), Jud Buechler (Chicago Bulls), Bison Dele (Chicago Bulls), Sean Elliott (San Antonio Spurs) and Kenny Lofton (Major League Baseball six time all-star). Multiple knee surgeries sidelined Mason's hope of a continuing basketball career. Mason is on the National Leadership Council and the board of trustees for the University of Arizona.

== Songwriting and music production highlights ==
- Lionel Richie – "Wasted Time"
- Stevie Wonder featuring Ariana Grande – "Faith"
- 50 Cent featuring Brevi – "Be My Bitch"
- Avant – "4 Minutes", "When It Hurts"
- Babyface – "Cant Stop Now", "Loneliness"
- Backstreet Boys – "Rush Over Me"
- BoA – "CAMO"
- Bob James – "Fly By"
- Justin Bieber – "Catching Feelings"
- E-17 – "I Miss You", "I'm Here For You", "Whatever You Need"
- Victoria Beckham – "Girlfriend", "Always Be My Baby"
- Beyoncé – "Listen"
- Jack Black & Cee-Lo – "Kung Fu Fighting"
- Brandy – "Truthfully"
- B2K – "Gots Ta Be"
- B5 – "All Over Again, "What It Do", "Things I Would Do"
- Dane Bowers – "Shut Up And Forget About It"
- Tamar Braxton – "All The Way Home"
- Toni Braxton – "He Wasn't Man Enough", "I Wanna Be (Your Baby)", "I Hate You", "Finally", "Hands Tied", "Hero", "Why Don't You Love Me", "Stay"
- Chris Brown – "Ya Man Ain't Me", "Young Love", "Is This Love", "Take You Down", "Help Me", "Get At'Cha", "Nothin", "Lottery", "Superhuman", "Heart Ain't A Brain", Turn Up The Music, "Free Run"
- Kelly Clarkson – "Thankful", "You Thought Wrong"
- Javier – "Beautiful U R", "Biggest Mistake", "Slow Motion"
- Deborah Cox – "If I Had One Wish", "U Need To Quit"
- Craig David – "Take 'Em Off", "My Love Don't Stop"
- Dream – "That's OK", "Promise Me"
- Dreamgirls – Movie Soundtrack
- EXO – "Overdose", "Moonlight", "Diamond", "Sign", "24/7"
- EXO-CBX – Vroom Vroom
- Jonghyun — "Hallelujah"
- Fantasia – "Ain't Gonna Beg", "This Is Me", "Always on My Mind"
- Fifth Harmony – "Sledgehammer"
- Fourplay – "Sexual Healing", "Love TKO" (featuring Ruben Studdard)
- Aretha Franklin featuring Fantasia – "Put You Up on Game"
- Aretha Franklin featuring Mary J. Blige – "Never Gonna Break My Faith"
- Ginuwine – "Good For Nothing", "Please You"
- Girls' Generation – "Mr.Mr."
- Whitney Houston – "I Look To You", "Song For You"
- Jennifer Hudson – "And I Am Telling You I'm Not Going", "Love You I Do", "Where You At", "If This Isn't Love", "My Heart", "You Pulled Me Through", "Invisible"
- R.L. Huggar – "Good Man", "Model Chick"
- Human Nature – The Christmas Album, "Christmas Without You"
- Tiffany Hwang – "Heartbreak Hotel"
- Lyfe Jennings – "Cops Up"
- Joe – "Ain't Nothin' Like Me", "Priceless", "Beautiful"
- JoJo – "Baby, It's You", "Never Say Goodbye"
- Jud Mahoney – "Perfect Girl, Now You Got Someone, Come Back, Same Amazing You "
- Donell Jones – "Ooh Na Na", "Cuttin Me Off"
- K-Ci & JoJo – "Love Me Carefully"
- Tynisha Keli – "Walls Up"
- Dave Koz – "Whisper in Your Ear"
- John Legend – "Fall From Grace"
- Leona Lewis – "I Know Who I Am"
- Luke and Q – "My Turn"
- Mario – "What Your Name Is", "Holla Back", "Could U Be", "How Could You", "I'm The One", "If I Hurt You"
- Marques Houston – "Naked", "Always & Forever"
- Mary J. Blige – "Never Gonna Break My Faith", "Living Proof"
- Jessica Mauboy – "Fight For You", "Here For Me"
- Brian McKnight – "Shoulda Woulda Coulda", "Played Yourself", "Stay Or Let It Go"
- Katharine McPhee – "Do What You Do"
- Mishon – "Text Me", "Life Guard", "Just A Kiss"
- Monica – "Sideline Ho", "My Everything"
- Musiq Soulchild – "Today"
- NCT – "Faded In My Last Song"
- NCT 127 – "Limitless", "Sit Down!", "White Night"
- NLT – "That Girl"
- Nina – "What If"
- Olivia – "You Got The Damn Thing"
- Omarion – "O", "Midnight", "Im Try'na"
- Stacie Orrico – "(There's Gotta Be) More to Life", "I Promise"
- Produce 101 (Season 2) – "Hands On Me"
- Calvin Richardson – "Not Like This"
- SHINee – "Symptoms", "Lipstick", "Rescue"
- Jordin Sparks – "No Air" – featuring Chris Brown, "Don't Let It Go To Your Head"
- Britney Spears – "Mannequin"
- Spice Girls – "Let Love Lead The Way"
- Ruben Studdard – "Sorry 2004", "Change Me", "Get Loose", "Love TKO" (Fourplay)
- Taeyang – "I Will"
- Tank – "Please Don't Go", "My Body", My Heart", "Wedding Song", "If You Dream", "Sex Music", "Beautiful", "You Mean That Much", "Your My Star"
- Justin Timberlake – "Still on My Brain"
- TGT – "No Fun, "I Need", "Weekend Love", "Explode", "Our House"
- TVXQ! - "Apology"
- Tyrese – "I Like Them Girls", "How You Gonna Act Like That", "One", "I Ain't Tryna", "Better To Know", "Come Back To Me Shawty", "With Me"
- J. Valentine – "She's Worth The Trouble", "Wassup", "Heartbreak"
- Luther Vandross – "If I Was The One"
- Luther Vandross and Elton John – "Anyone Who Had A Heart"
- Red Velvet – "Butterflies", "Rainbow Halo"
- Charlie Wilson – "What If I'm The One", "Homeless", "Can't Live Without You"
- Elliott Yamin – "Doorway", "Always"
- Ya Boy – "We Ready" (from "More Than A Game" soundtrack)
- Jackson Yi – "Nothing to Lose"
- Jane Zhang – "Pull Me Up"
- Kele Le Roc – "Kiss Me"
- Shola Ama – "In Return"

Cultural offices
Preceded by Deborah Dugan	President of The Recording Academy; 2020–present	Succeeded by Incumbent
