= George Washington University Student Association =

George Washington University Student Government Association
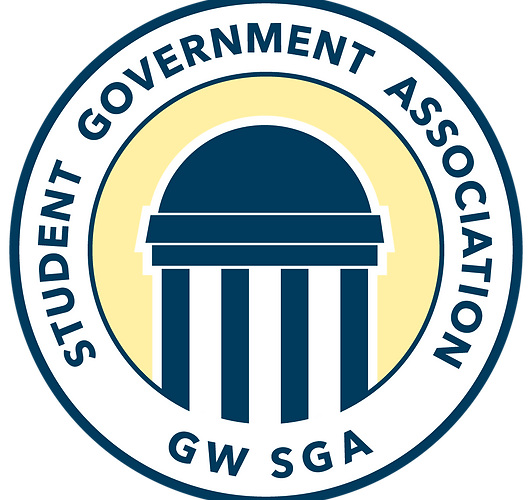
- Institution: George Washington University
- Location: Washington, D.C.
- Established: Origin; 1909; Constitution; 1976
- President: MJ Childs
- Vice president: Aicha Sy
- Members: 24,500 (2025)
- Website: sa.gwu.edu

The George Washington University Student Government Association (known as the GW Student Government Association or SGA) is the student government of the George Washington University in Washington, DC. The SGA is responsible for advocacy on behalf of the GW student body at and is modeled after the U.S. Federal Government and consists of three branches: legislative, executive and judicial.

The origins of GW's Student Government Association trace back to 1909, but the current structure dates to 24 May 1976, when the current constitution was adopted by a university-wide referendum, which established the Executive Cabinet, the Senate, and the Student Court. Numerous alumni of GW's student government have gone on to pursue prominent careers in politics, such as Edward David Burt (youngest ever Premier of Bermuda), in diplomacy, such as Ambassador Edward Gnehm (Presidential Distinguished Award winner), and in the private sector, such as Neil Portnow (former president of The Recording Academy).

== History ==
In 1909, a student representational system governed by various class presidents or officers was founded.

In 1930, the previous system was abolished in favor of the creation of the GW Student Council. All schools in 1930 were to receive one representative for every 500 students. In 1938 the constitution was changed. The new Council was composed of 9 members elected of the student body at large and 5 members from various student groups. It was given the following powers: 1) to make rules governing elections, 2) to classify activities as "major" or "minor," 3) to require major activities to file prospect covering their programs for each year, 4) to prescribe systems of accounts and records for any activity, and, 5) to make rules providing appropriate penalties for violation of any rule, regulation, or order of the Council.

The Council system, with modifications (it later became known as the Student Assembly), continued until February 27, 1970, when 69% of the student body voted in a referendum to dissolve the student government.

Student Assembly president Neil Portnow ran for reelection with the abolition of the Assembly as the major plank of his platform. He won, and on February 17 read a statement to The GW Hatchet and other press announcing the abolition of GW's student government.

It wasn't until 1974 that a referendum to bring back some form of student government was initiated, and in January 1975 students voted to create a new governing system by a five to one margin. The George Washington University Student Government Association came into being in April 1976 when students ratified a new constitution by a vote of 1,343 to 241. On May 24 of that year the Board of Trustees ratified the Student Government Association charter. Membership included all full-time, part-time, graduate, professional and undergraduate students who were registered for academic credit. Today, the Student Government Association is made up of the executive, senate and judicial branches.

Starting in 2010 the SGA focused on reducing printing fees after charges were leveled that the University was profiting off of students. After having little success the issue was again taken up in 2011 with the formation of a joint committee of students and faculty after stonewalling from the university administration. Second semester of the 2011-2012 academic year there was again another vow to renew the fight against student fees. Eventually, the fee was reduced.

Other advocacy efforts have included the restoration of free news papers to student after they were cut by the University. There was also a push to ban smoking on campus by the Senate that led to a campus wide referendum that passed overwhelmingly, but needs to be enacted by the administration. The Student Government Association has also successfully lobbied for the installation of condom dispensers in residence halls.

== Organization ==
=== Executive Cabinet ===
The Executive Cabinet is the executive branch of the SGA. The President and Vice President (VP), elected on separate tickets by the 26,000 graduate and undergraduate students, oversee the Executive Branch, which consists of the Executive Cabinet and several subordinate entities. The President appoints Executive Secretaries who lead their own "departments," such as Diversity, Equity, and Inclusion and Academic Affairs. These Secretaries must receive confirmation from two-thirds of the Senate. Assistant Secretaries are also appointed by the President, and also must receive Senate confirmation, but can be created or eliminated at will.

The Cabinet is typically led by the President and their Chief of Staff. The "Executive Cabinet" is made up of the President, Chief of Staff, Treasurer (chief financial officer), Legislator General (chief legislative officer), and Communications Director.

List of SGA Executive Cabinet Members
Year	President	Vice President	Chief of Staff	Treasurer	Legislator General	Communications Director
2026-2027	MJ Childs	Aicha Sy	Skye Graham/Jude Poisson			Emma Reinhard
2025-2026	Ethan Lynne	Liz Stoddard	Peyton Gallant/Jorey Reyes	Maya Renteria	Alexia Colella	Aiden Linkov/Emma Reinhard
2024-2025	Ethan Fitzgerald	Ethan Lynne	Max Fagelman/Deepthi Shreedharan	Skylar Pirnar	Oscar Gladysz	Alexandra Tauber
2023-2024	Arielle Geismar	Demetrius Apostolis	Isabella Calamari	Sandy Huang	Jacob Solomon	Ishani Patel
2022-2023	Christian Zidouemba	Yan Xu	Keanu Rowe/Cordelia Scales	Arya Thakur	Andrew Harding	Aiza Saeed
2021-2022	Brandon Hill	Kate Carpenter	Zachary Nosanchuk/Catherine Morris	Charles Aborisade	Holden Fitzgerald	Cat Oriel

=== Senate ===
The Senate is the SGA holds the power to approve bills that are sent to the President, as well as control the Student Government Association's $1,778,704 budget. The Senate consists of 43 Senators representing their respective schools within the university, the Vice President who is the presiding officer, a Senate Chairperson Pro Tempore, and Senate Staff appointed by the Vice President and confirmed by 2/3rds of the Senate. The 2025-2026 Presiding Officer of the Senate is Vice President Liz Stoddard. The Senate consists of seven standing committees that include the Governance and Nominations Committee, Financial Services and Allocations Committee, Physical Facilities and Urban Affairs Committee, Joint Student Life Committee, Joint Education Policy Committee, Sustainability Committee, and the Community, Advocacy, and Inclusion Committee. The Senate has the mandate of making recommendations on issues that affect student life, give general direction to Student Government Association policies, collect a student fee from tuition and subsequent disbursement, and passing of bills as it sees fit among other powers. The 2025-2026 Chairperson Pro Tempore of the SGA Senate is Jose Dalmau.

List of SGA Senate Leadership
Year	Vice President and Presiding Officer of the Senate	Senate Chairperson Pro Tempore	Chief of Staff	Legislative Budget Office Director	Chief Counselor to the Senate	Communications Director
2026-2027	Aicha Sy		Katy Corcoran	Harry Crowley		Emma Reinhard
2025-2026	Liz Stoddard	Jose Dalmau	Madison Yohe	Connor Linggi	Anja Ree	Aimee Okagawa
2024-2025	Ethan Lynne	Liz Stoddard	Katelyn Moon	Maya Renteria	Alexia Colella	Peyton Gallant
2023-2024	Demetrius Apostolis	Amy Cowley	Ishana Bandyopadhyay	Nathan Nguyen Maya Renteria	Henry Mills Neil Sairam	Katelyn Moon
2022-2023	Yan Xu	Demetrius Apostolis	Ishana Bandyopadhyay	Nathan Nguyen	Juan Carlos Mora	Ishani Patel
2021-2021	Kate Carpenter	Cordelia Scales	Chris Johnson	N/A	N/A	N/A

Governance and Nominations Committee

The Governance and Nominations Committee shall focus on issues and legislation concerning amendments to the Constitution and these Bylaws, with such amendments pertaining to financial matters jointly shared with the Financial Services and Allocations Committee, screening candidates for all Senate vacancies, working with the Presiding Officer in the operation of the Senate, impeachment, removal, recall, and censure, the allocations appeal process, during which the Chairperson Pro-Tempore shall serve as Chairperson of the Allocation Appeals Committee, general oversight of internal Student Government Association operations across all three branches of government, and general oversight of all Senate Committees.

Financial Services and Allocations Committee

The Finance Committee is in charge of the funds that the Senate collects from student tuition to fund the Student Government Association budget, collecting just over $1.7 million. These funds are primarily doled out to the over 500 student organizations on campus at The George Washington University in addition to funding the operational budget of the Student Government Association. The Committee is responsible for setting criteria for disbursements and working with the Vice President for Financial Affairs, a member of the President's cabinet. In 2012 the Finance Committee put a Student Fee Increase to a student body referendum. The proposal sought to increase the amount the SGA collects from students to $3.00 per credit hour from $1.50 per credit hour, boosting the SGA budget to an estimated $1.75 million over nine years. The referendum was ratified by the student body with 66% voting in favor.

Student Life Committee

The Student Life Committee is responsible for advocating on issues that affect students. Primarily, the Committee raises these issues at Senate meetings and proposes bills to be used as the basis for advocacy efforts. As of the 2021-2022 academic year, the committee was divided into an undergraduate and graduate assembly.

Education Policy Committee

The Education Policy Committee (formerly Academic Affairs Committee) primarily focuses on issues that relate to students' academics. The Committee works closely with the Faculty Senate and university administration to address relevant issues. As of the 2021-2022 academic year, the committee was renamed the "Education Policy Committee" and divided into an undergraduate and graduate assembly.

Physical Facilities and Urban Affairs Committee

The Committee on Physical Facilities and Urban Affairs (PFUA) shall focus on issues and legislation concerning the Safety and Facilities, such as GWPD, Housing, Campus Buildings, and Events and Venues, Business Services such as GWorld, Dining, Facility Services, FixIt, Safe Ride, Mail Services, and Parking, Student Wellbeing, such as Disability Support Services, Campus Advisories, Lerner Health and Wellness, GW Health Center/Counseling, and The Store; and the general operation of the University.

Sub-committee on Sustainability

The Permanent Sub-Committee on Sustainability is a sub-committee under the Committee on Physical Facilities and Urban Affairs. The Permanent Subcommittee shall focus on issues and legislation relating to sustainability measures on campus. Legislation can be referred directly to the Subcommittee, which has the power to submit approved legislation to the Full Senate for consideration.

Community Advocacy and Inclusion Committee

The Community Advocacy and Inclusion Committee (CAIC) work closely with the Office for Diversity, Equity, and Community Engagement to advocate on behalf of multicultural student groups on campus. The assembly also creates strategic plans to ensure representation and foster multicultural community outreach.

=== Student Court ===
The Judicial Branch consists of the Student Court, composed of seven members, three of whom must be undergraduate, three who must be graduates, and one who must be a law student. Members of the Court serve for their entire academic career after being appointed by the President and confirmed by the Senate. The court has jurisdiction over any cases the involve suits brought between parties within the Student Government Association and between other student organizations suing the Student Government Association.

Presidential candidate Kyle Boyer won the popular vote, but was charged with a violation of election rules for failing to report the market value of a car used during campaigning. Julie Bindleglass lost the popular vote, but became President of the SGA when the Joint Election Committee, active during elections, threw Boyer off the ballot. Boyer then sued the Joint Elections Committee in the Student Court. The Court used a 1992 precedent in which Presidential candidate Christopher Ferguson alleged he was thrown off the ballot in an "arbitrary and capricious manner", criteria for bringing a case to the court, as precedent for hearing the case. The Student Court upheld the disqualification from the ballot and effectively decided the outcome of the election.

== List of SGA presidents and vice presidents ==
Term	President	Vice President	Notes
2026-2027	MJ Childs	Aicha Sy	Childs is the first SGA outsider to be elected President since 2023. Sy previously served as an undergraduate CCAS senator and is the first black woman and youngest person to be elected Vice President.
2025-2026	Ethan Lynne	Liz Stoddard	At the time of the election, Lynne served as the Vice President. Stoddard served as the Chairperson Pro Tempore.
2024-2025	Ethan Fitzgerald	Ethan Lynne	Prior to the election, Fitzgerald and Lynne served as CCAS senators. Fitzgerald served as co-chair and founder of the Mental Health Assembly while Lynne served as chairman of the Finance and Allocations Committee.
2023-2024	Arielle Geismar	Demetrius Apostolis	At the time of election, Geismar was the President of GW Residence Hall Association, and Apostolis was the Senate Chairperson Pro Tempore.
2022-2023	Christian Zidouemba	Yan Xu	Christian Zidouemba won after his third campaign for student body President.
2021-2022	Brandon Hill	Kate Carpenter	At the time of the election, Hill was an incumbent and Carpenter was a Senator-at-large.
2021	Brandon Hill	Catherine Morris	Upon assuming the Presidency following his predecessor's resignation, Hill appointed Morris as EVP.
2020-2021	Howard Brookins III	Brandon Hill	Brookins resigned in January 2021, with EVP Hill assuming the Presidency.
2019-2020	SJ Matthews	Amy Martin	SJ Matthews won the run-off election, after an inconclusive general election in which Justin Diamond won a plurality of votes following a write-in campaign.
2018-2019	Ashley Le	Ojani Walthrust	
2017-2018	Peak Sen Chua	Sydney Nelson	After the Presidential election was delayed and later cancelled, Chua, then EVP-elect, assumed the Presidency and nominated Nelson to be his Executive Vice President.
2016-2017	Erika Feinman	Thomas Falcigno	Feinman and Falcigno previously served as SGA senators.
2015-2016	Andie Dowd	Casey Syron/Thomas Falcigno	Falcigno substituted Syron after his mid-term resignation.
2014-2015	Nick Gumas	Avra Bossov	Gumas was elected as the first openly gay President.
2013-2014	Julia Susuni	Kostas Skordalos	
2012-2013	Ashwin Narla	Abby Bergren	
2011-2012	John Richardson	Ted Costigan	
2010-2011	Jason Lifton	Rob Maxim	Lifton previously served as EVP.
2009-2010	Julie Bindelglass	Jason Lifton	Bindelglass was elected as the third female President.
2008-2009	Vishal Aswani	Kyle Boyer	
2007-2008	Nicole Capp	Brand Kroeger	Capp was elected as the second female President.
2006-2007	Lamar Thorpe	Josh Lasky	
2005-2006	Audai Shakour	Morgan Corr	
2004-2005	Omar Woodard	Anyah Dembling	
2003-2004	Kristopher Hart	Eric Daleo	
2002-2003	Phil Robinson	Eric Daleo	
2001-2002	Roger Kapoor	Joshua Singer	
2000-2001	Edward David Burt	Cathy Resler	Burt later became the youngest ever Premier of Bermuda.
1999-2000	Caity Leu	Kim McGraw	Upon assuming the Presidency following his predecessor's impeachment and removal, Leu appointed McGraw as EVP.
1999	Phil Meisner	Caity Leu	Meisner was impeached and removed from office in November 1999, with EVP Leu assuming the Presidency.
1998-1999	Carrie Potter	Jesse Strauss	Potter was elected as the first female President.
1997-1998	Kuyomars “Q” Golparvar	Tony Sayegh	
1996-1997	Damian McKenna	Dianne Gayoski	Gayoski was the first female to be elected EVP, and McKenna was the first Engineering student to be elected SGA President.
1995-1996	Mark Reynolds		
1994-1995	Alfred Park	Scott Slifka	
1993-1994	Scott Adams		
1992-1993	Jonathan Tarnow	Jim Arnsenault	Upon assuming the Presidency following his predecessor's resignation, Tarnow appointed Arsenault as EVP.
1992	Michael Musante	Jonathan Tarnow	Musante resigned in October 1992, with EVP Tarnow assuming the Presidency.
1991-1992	Kyle Farmbry	David Parker	Farmbry was elected as the first black President.
1990-1991	Frank Petramale	David Parker	
1989-1990	John David Morris		
1988-1989	Raffi Terzian		
1987-1988	Adam Freedman		Freedman was the first President to serve two terms.
1986-1987	Adam Freedman		
1985-1986	Ira Gubernick		
