= Deborah Dugan =

American music industry executive

- Known for: Former president and CEO of the Recording Academy; Former Chief Executive Officer of (RED)
- Title: CEO of Beyond Type 1
- Term: 2019–2020
- Predecessor: Neil Portnow
- Successor: Harvey Mason Jr.
- Children: 3

Deborah Dugan is an American executive, social impact strategist, and nonprofit leader known for her work in corporate entertainment and philanthropy. She is the CEO of diabetes nonprofit Beyond Type 1. Dugan was the first female president and CEO of the Recording Academy, which presents the Grammy Awards, and led governance reforms and diversity initiatives. She held senior leadership roles as the CEO of (RED) and President of Disney Publishing Worldwide as well as Executive Vice President at EMI/Angel Records.

Awarded PTTOW!'s Nelson Mandela Changemaker Award, Dugan has given the keynotes at Columbia Business School's Social Enterprise Conference and a Salesforce conference. She has contributed to Forbes.com and HuffPost and appeared on NPR's All Things Considered, Mad Money with Jim Cramer, and PBS News Hour, among other outlets.

== Early life and education ==
Dugan grew up on Long Island and in Florida. Her father was Thomas Dugan, who worked for a time in the U.S. Justice Department and served as inspector general of the Peace Corps under Sargent Shriver, and her mother was a homemaker. Thomas died when she was six, and although her family was helped by high-powered friends, Deborah worked from a young age. She attended the University of Florida, majoring in education, making the dean's list, and graduated. She then went to and graduated from the University of Utah Law School.

== Career ==
Dugan started her New York career as an attorney on Wall Street, as a corporate associate at Mudge Rose Guthrie Alexander & Ferdon focussing on business transactions like mergers and acquisitions. At the same time she did pro-bono work for Volunteer Lawyers for the Arts (VLA). Dugan eventually took a pay cut to lead the organization, as director of legal services.

=== Work in music and publishing ===
Dugan transitioned to startup SBK Records, where she worked with artists like Belgian electronics group Technotronic, Vanilla Ice, Wilson Phillips, and Tracy Chapman. When the company merged with EMI/Capitol Records, she became its executive vice president adding to her roster musicians like Paul McCartney, George Harrison, and Joan Baez. Dugan then worked for Disney Publishing Worldwide for eight years, becoming its president in 2002, where she oversaw 275 magazines, including Discover and Disney Magazine, and published more than 4,000 new books, generating $1.8 billion in global retail sales.

Dugan then worked for British media company Entertainment Rights as president and CEO of the North America division from 2007 to 2009, restructuring it and growing its biggest content work, one year, 27 percent. She was senior advisor to the Tribeca Enterprises Board from 2009 to 2011, where she evaluated and executed revenue streams for Robert De Niro and Jane Rosenthal's company and fleshed out venue strategies for its Flashpoint Production Academy helping it integrate into Tribeca Flashpoint.

=== CEO of (RED) ===
In 2011, Dugan embarked on work as CEO of (RED), co-founded by Bono and Bobby Shriver after interviewing for a job that wasn't the right fit. The nonprofit aims to enlist the help of private companies and citizens in the global fight to eradicate AIDS: in Sub-Saharan Africa It has since tasked itself to also combat the effects of COVID-19. Dugan rearranged her life to travel to Africa, among other things, and, under her tenure, (RED) began to partner with Coca-Cola, Salesforce, Bank of America, Vespa, Snapchat, Nickelodeon, Moschino, Jeremy Scott, Latin America's telecommunications companies Claro and Telcel, and German multinational SAP, among others. Notable campaigns under Dugan also include the Super Bowl, Jimmy Kimmel Live, Beats by Dre, Starbucks, and Amazon. In 2017, Amazon released a Red limited edition of the Echo speaker to support the Global Fund. During her tenure with the organization, with a team of 25 in New York, (RED) reached $660 million for the Global Fund and impacted the lives of more than 110 million. Dugan explained to the attendees of Columbia Business School's 2013 Social Enterprise Conference "We try to come up with things that have never been done before and that are really big."

From 2011 to 2015, Dugan also contributed to Huffington Post, in 2017 and 2018, to Forbes.com. She gave the keynote at Columbia Business School's 2013 Social Enterprise Conference. In 2017 Dugan was awarded PTTOW!'s Nelson Mandela Changemaker Award.

=== Recording Academy presidency and settlement ===
In response to the outrage over the low female representation at the 2018 Grammys and then-CEO/President Neil Portnow's comment that women musicians needed to "step up" in order to achieve parity, an 18-person task force led by Time's Up co-founder Tina Tchen was created to study the Recording Academy's problems and make recommendations. From 2013 to 2018, 9.3 percent of the nominees in the five major Grammy Awards categories were women. After a search, in May 2019, its board of trustees confirmed that Dugan would be its next president and CEO. She began her tenure in August 2019, succeeding Portnow, becoming the first woman president of the $60M nonprofit, and her contract was for three years.

In April 2018, 20 percent of the Recording Academy's voting members identified as women; Dugan aimed to double female voters by 2025. She also stated the Academy mismangaged its finances and practiced vote-fixing.

On January 16, 2020, Dugan was abruptly relieved of her duties and placed on administrative leave, accused of bullying her assistant, whom she inherited from Portnow. The assistant made a leave of absence, and Recording Academy Chairman Harvey Mason Jr., whom had been working with Dugan, took over as interim president and CEO. In response, Dugan made claims that the organization was complicit in corruption, citing "voting irregularities, financial mismanagement, 'exorbitant and unnecessary' legal bills, and conflicts of interest involving members of the academy's board, executive committee and outside lawyers". On March 2, 2020, the Recording Academy announced that it had officially fired her. A letter was sent to its members informing them of the action taken by its board of trustees. The organization also tightened their conflict of interest rules that June.

In April 2021, the Recording Academy eliminated its secret voting committees that had existed for 28 years. Within two months, it had settled with Dugan for an undisclosed amount.

=== Beyond Type 1 ===
In April 2022, she was named CEO of diabetes nonprofit Beyond Type 1 cofounded by singer Nick Jonas and Juliet de Baubigny. Dugan has overseen organizational transformation for the world's largest digital community for diabetes. In November 2025, Beyond Type 1 celebrated its 10th anniversary at the Ziegfeld Theater in New York City. That year it gave grants to Glucose Guide, Diabetes Insights, Mobile Healthcare Association, Mobile Care Chicago, Hip Hop Public Health, and the Morehouse School of Medicine H.E.A.L. Clinic to grow mobile health and telehealth services, and host community-based screening and education events with partners in cities including Tampa, Florida, Miami, Los Angeles, Washington, D.C., New York, Denver, Atlanta, Chicago, Detroit, and Dallas.

In India, Beyond Type 1 has given grants to local partners to amplify efforts in high-need regions, Delhi-NCR, Rajasthan, Maharashtra, Tamil Nadu. Programs raise awareness of the signs of diabetes, provide education and training for schools, communities, and healthcare providers, and construct support networks.

== Awards ==
- Forbes's 100 Most Powerful Women, Social Entrepreneurism issue
- Elle's Top Women to Help Change the World
- Innovation Fellow, Columbia University Business School
- Tribeca Disruptor Awards Fellow
- PTTOW!'s Nelson Mandela Changemaker Award
- Legacy Award, The Moth, 2025

== Board memberships and associations ==
Dugan was on the board of The Moth for 15 years, co-chairing it from 2015 to 2010. CEO Sarah Haberman described her as "a visionary leader whose dedication has transformed industries and ensured that powerful stories reach the world. Her 15 years of service on The Moth's Board ... have been instrumental in shaping our organization. Coupled with her leadership in global nonprofit initiatives, Deborah's impact is immeasurable." For five years, she also served on the board of the London-and-Nairobi-based creative nonprofit Girl Effect, which uses the reach of media and tech to unleash the power of girls’ content, choices, and transformations. Dugan is on the board of advisors of CITYarts.

Dugan is a member of the Association of American Publishers and the International Academy of Television Arts and Sciences.

Cultural offices
Preceded by Neil Portnow	President of The Recording Academy; 2019–2020	Succeeded by Harvey Mason Jr.
