= Tony Sayegh =

American political strategist and government official (born 1976)

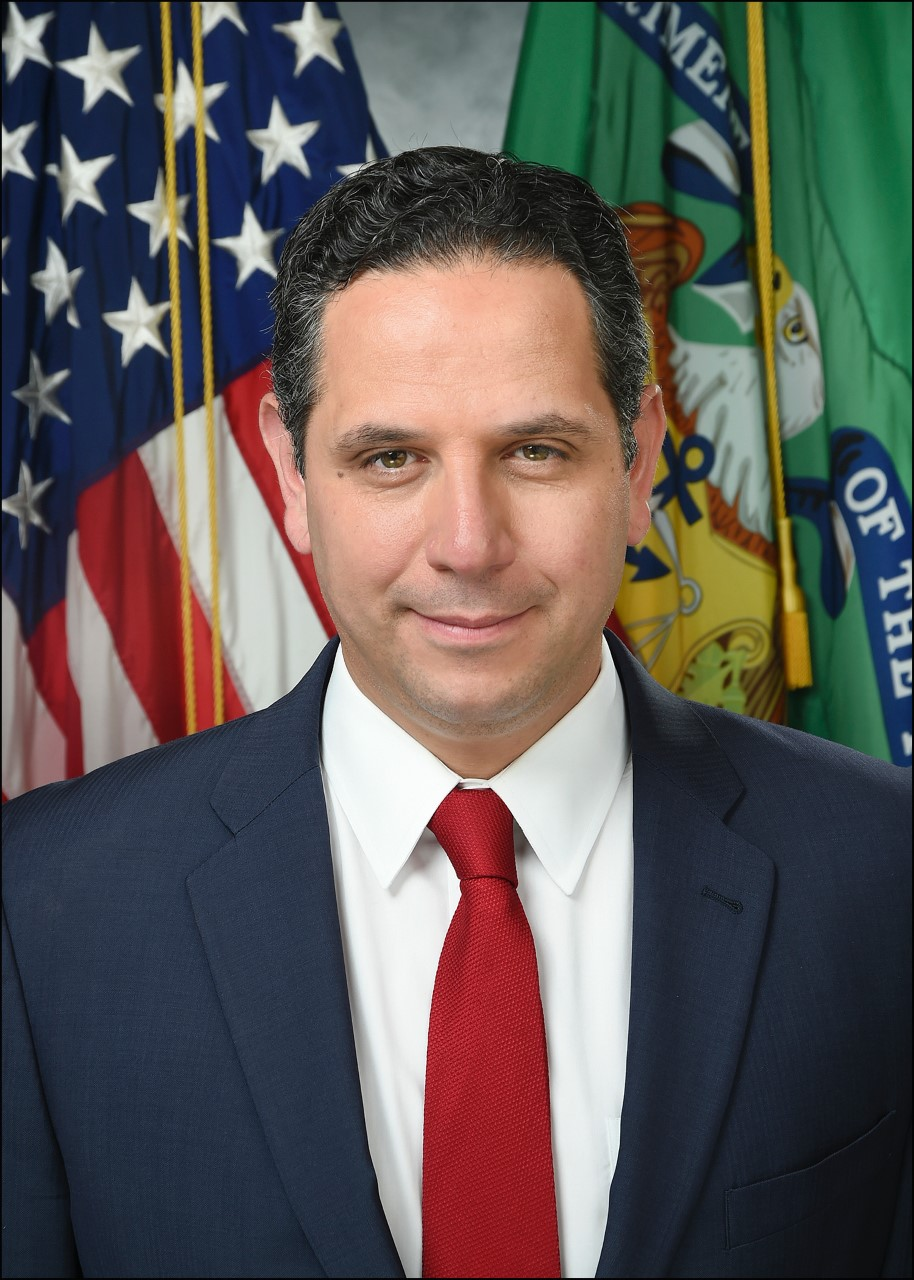

United States Assistant Secretary of the Treasury for Public Affairs
- In office March 6, 2017 – June 2019
- President: Donald Trump
- Preceded by: Victoria Esser
- Succeeded by: Monica Crowley

Personal details
- Born: Tony Elias Sayegh Jr. October 29, 1976 (age 49) New York City, U.S.
- Party: Republican
- Education: George Washington University (BA, MPA)

Tony Sayegh (born October 29, 1976, in Brooklyn, New York) served as a White House Senior Advisor for Strategy until February 2020, and is a former Assistant Secretary for Public Affairs for the U.S. Department of the Treasury, serving from March 6, 2017, to June 2019. He led the department's Office of Public Affairs. During the passage of the Tax Cuts And Jobs Act, Sayegh was detailed to the White House Office of Communications appearing numerous times in the media to promote the passage of comprehensive tax reform. Sayegh was a Republican strategist and contributor for the Fox News Channel prior to joining the administration, and served as Executive Vice President at Jamestown Associates from 2013 to 2017.

== Early life and education ==
Sayegh's parents, Amale and Tony Sayegh, immigrated from Lebanon in the 1960s. He attended George Washington University in Washington, D.C., where he received a B.A. in political science and a Master of Public Administration. Sayegh was elected Executive Vice President of the George Washington University Student Association and was awarded the Presidential Administrative Fellowship at the University. He later served on the University Board of Trustees.

== Career ==
Sayegh served in numerous Republican Communications and Press roles, including for the 2000 Republican National Convention, Governor George Pataki and vice presidential candidate Jack Kemp.

In 2003, Sayegh was elected to public office, serving two terms as Deputy Mayor and Trustee for the Village of Tuckahoe, New York. He acted as liaison to the Police and Fire Departments, courts, and schools and managed the Intergovernmental relations portfolio for the Village Board.

Beginning in April 2009, Sayegh appeared as a regular guest on the Fox News Channel, where he represented his views as a Republican campaign strategist and political analyst. In January 2013, he became a Fox News Contributor, and appeared across multiple network platforms including the Fox News Channel, Fox Business Network, FoxNews.com and Fox News Radio. Sayegh served as a Spring 2017 Georgetown University Institute of Politics Fellow. In addition to his role as a Fox News contributor, Sayegh maintained an active media portfolio, having served as a National Political Correspondent for Talk Radio News Service (now Talk Media News), based in Washington, D.C., and as a Republican analyst at Cablevision's News 12 Westchester / Hudson Valley.

Prior to his service in the Trump Administration, Sayegh served as Executive Vice President of Jamestown Associates, a nationally recognized political consulting and media advertising firm. His campaigns received industry recognition, including winning the 2014 Reed Award for "Most Original TV Advertisement" and the 2015 Reed Award for "Best Comparative Mail Piece". Jamestown Associates produced TV advertisements for the presidential campaign of Donald J. Trump.

Upon his departure from the Treasury in June 2019, Secretary Mnuchin awarded Sayegh with the Alexander Hamilton Award, the highest honor bestowed by the department.

In September 2019 Sayegh joined Teneo, A global CEO advisory firm, as Managing Director working out of both the New York City and D.C. offices.

In November 2019 Sayegh joined the White House staff as Senior Advisor for Strategy in what was expected to be a temporary position to help organize the response to the House impeachment inquiry.

In April 2020, President Trump appointed Sayegh to be a member of the President's Advisory Committee on the Arts of the John F. Kennedy Center for the Performing Arts.

In July 2020, Sayegh was brought on as a consultant to help handle the Republican Convention. Sayegh, who had previously helped to steer the White House impeachment defense, was recruited to lead the programming for the four-day event.

In 2024, The Wall Street Journal profiled Sayegh as the head of public affairs for a major TikTok investor and a prominent opponent of the Protecting Americans from Foreign Adversary Controlled Applications Act.

== Personal life ==
Sayegh and his wife, Maria (née Cermele), live in Eastchester, New York, with their four sons.

== See also ==
- Impeachment inquiry against Donald Trump
