= Mr.Mr. (song) =

Single by Girls' Generation

from the EP Mr.Mr.
- Released: February 25, 2014
- Recorded: 2013
- Studio: SM Yellow Tail Studio (Seoul)
- Genre: Electropop; R&B
- Length: 3:56
- Label: SM; KT Music
- Composers: Harvey Mason, Jr.; Damon Thomas; Andrew Hey; Mike Daley; Britt Burton; Rodnae "Chikk" Bell
- Lyricists: Jo Yoon-kyung; Kim Hee-jeong

Girls' Generation singles chronology
"Galaxy Supernova" (2013)	"Mr.Mr." (2014)	"Catch Me If You Can" (2015)

Music video
- "Mr.Mr." on YouTube

"Mr.Mr." is a Korean song recorded by South Korean girl group Girls' Generation for their fourth Korean titular extended play (2014). The song was released on February 25, 2014, as a single from the EP. The song was composed by American production team The Underdogs, who had previously worked with Western artists including Britney Spears, Beyoncé, and Justin Timberlake. A music video for the song was initially planned to be released on February 19 but was postponed to February 28 due to the accidental deletion of some of the original files. This is the last title track featuring member Jessica Jung before her dismissal from the group.

"Mr.Mr." was described as an electropop and pop-R&B song that incorporates a hip hop beat and EDM-influenced buildups. The song received generally positive reviews from music critics, who praised its musical styles, which were deemed a departure from the group's signature bubblegum pop sound. The single ranked number 18 on Billboard magazine's list of 20 Best K-pop Songs of 2014 and was included on Time's list of 25 Best Songs of 2014 (So Far) in June 2014.

To promote the song and the EP, Girls' Generation appeared on several music programs including M Countdown, Music Bank, Show! Music Core, and Inkigayo around February and March 2014. The single was a commercial success in the group's native country South Korea, peaking atop the Gaon Digital Chart and selling over 900,000 digital units in 2014. It also charted at number three on the Korea K-Pop Hot 100 and number four on the Billboard World Digital Songs.

== Background and composition ==
"Mr.Mr."
"Mr.Mr." is a hybrid of electropop and R&B that mixes a hip hop beat and EDM-inspired buildups.

"Mr.Mr." was composed by American production team The Underdogs (Harvey Mason Jr., Damon Thomas, Andrew Hey, Mike Daley, Britt Burton, and Rodnae "Chikk" Bell), with Korean lyrics by Cho Yoon-kyung and Kim Hee-jeong (Jam Factory), who have written lyrics for Girls' Generation for eight years. The Underdogs had previously worked with Western artists including Britney Spears, Beyoncé, and Justin Timberlake. The song was released to South Korean KBS Radio Station on February 25, 2014, as a single from the EP of the same name (2014). A Japanese version of "Mr.Mr." was included on the group's 2014 Japanese greatest hits album The Best.

Musically, "Mr.Mr." was described by Billboard magazine's Jeff Benjamin as an electropop and pop-R&B song. An editor from Yonhap characterized it as an "electropop dance" song featuring elements of R&B, and Heather Phares, writing for AllMusic, noted that it "mixed a hip hop beat and EDM-inspired buildups" in its composition. Lyrically, "Mr.Mr." has a more proactive theme with lyrics prompting a reluctant man to be more courageous towards girls, a departure from the group's familiar themes.

== Music video and promotion ==
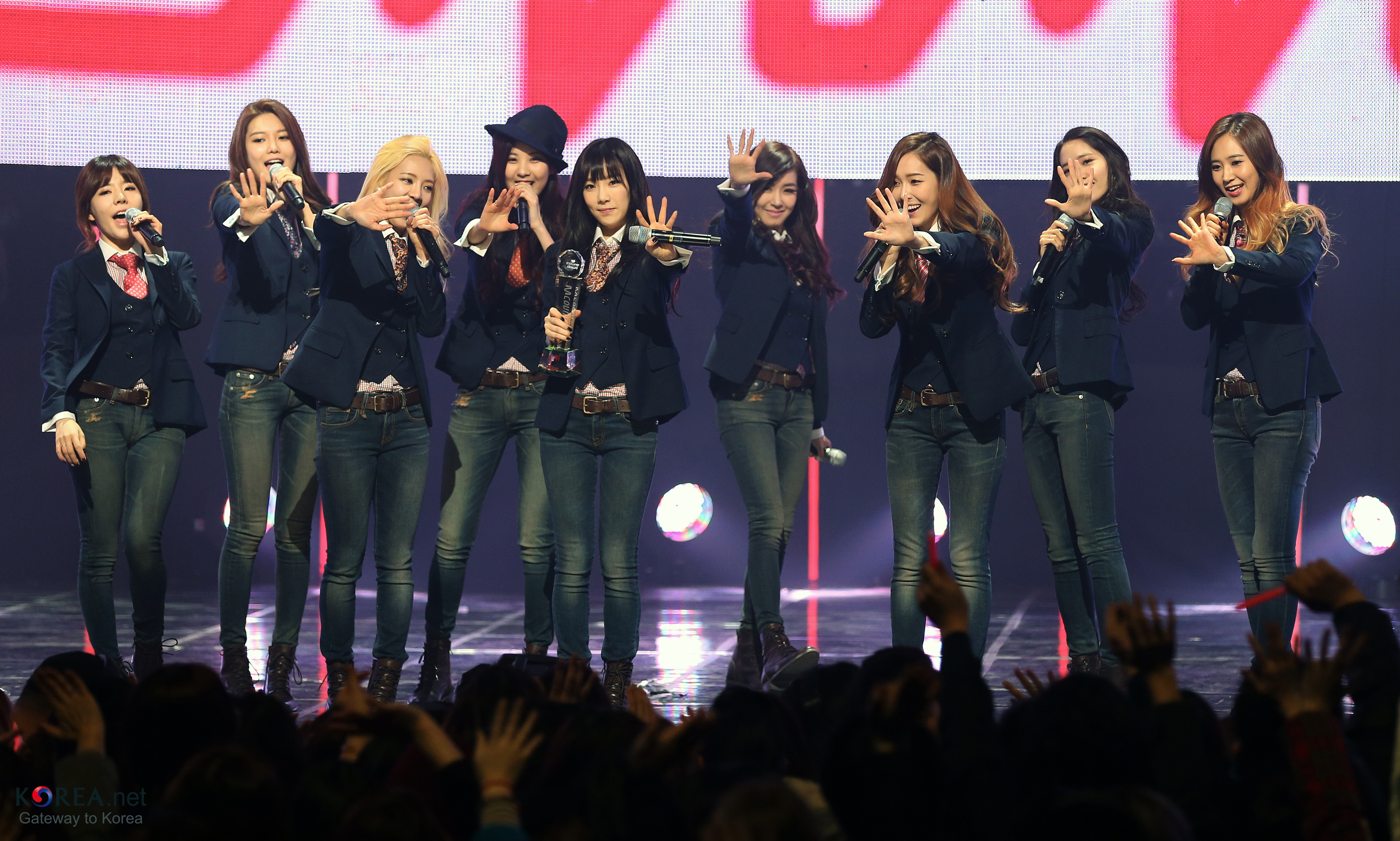
Girls' Generation performing "Mr.Mr." on M Countdown on March 6, 2014, where they achieved the top spot of the show

The music video for "Mr.Mr." was initially planned to be released on February 19, 2014, in conjunction with the release of the EP. However, the release date was postponed to February 28 due to the accidental deletion of some of the original shots, which necessitated re-filming the affected scenes. As a result, the group's comeback performances on South Korean music programs were also delayed for two weeks.

The music video was choreographed by Jillian Meyer (who had previously collaborated with artists including Janet Jackson and Kylie Minogue) and two members of BeatBurger – Shim Jae-won and Greg Hwang. It tells the story of a man who is diagnosed with heart disease but can not confess it to the girl he likes. He then decides to undergo a surgery, which is handled by the group's members who act as doctors. Group member Sooyoung argued that "Our new music video has the concept of encouraging and boosting the confidence of those men who have lost courage". The visual received positive reviews from media outlets; Fuse labelled it "cinematic" and praised its "sophisticated" class, and Popdust's Jacques Peterson hailed the video as "the hottest episode of Grey's Anatomy ever". It was the second most watched K-pop music video of the first half of 2014, trailing only Psy's music video for "Hangover".

To promote "Mr.Mr." and the EP, Girls' Generation made several appearances on South Korean music programs around February and March 2014. They performed the song for the first time on Mnet's M Countdown on March 6, 2014, as part of their comeback stage. The following three days, the group appeared on Music Bank, where they also performed "Back Hug", Show! Music Core, where they also performed "Wait a Minute", and Inkigayo.

== Critical reception ==
"Mr.Mr." received generally positive reviews from music critics. Jeff Benjamin from Billboard magazine hailed the single as "super-strong, super-sweet" and labelled it a welcome change compared to the group's previous "stupid-catchy" releases. AllMusic's reviewer Heather Phares said the track helped "[expand] their [Girls' Generation's] musical reach". John Walker from MTV News commented that the single's musical styles were more similar to "The Boys" (2011) rather than their usual styles as on "Gee" (2009), and labelled it a hybrid of "70's-throwback" and "Get Me Bodied".

Time magazine's Lily Rothman included "Mr.Mr." on the publication's list of 25 Best Songs of 2014 (So Far) in June. She wrote that "Fans [...] won’t be disappointed by their latest dance-friendly single" and added that "the addition of a scratchy electronic bass line and a hint of darkness" should attract listeners who were not used to their signature bubblegum pop sound. Billboard named "Mr.Mr." the 18th best K-pop song on their list of 20 Best K-pop Songs of 2014. It appeared at number 84 on the same magazine's list of the 100 Greatest K-Pop Songs of the 2010s in 2019.

== Commercial performance ==
"Mr.Mr." peaked atop the South Korean Gaon Digital Chart in the tenth week of 2014. It was the 46th best-selling song of 2014 in South Korea, selling over 906,962 digital units. Overall, it became the 54th best-performing song on the Gaon Digital Chart, based on additional streaming and instrumental track downloads. "Mr.Mr." also charted at number three on the Korea K-Pop Hot 100, and number four on the Billboard World Digital Songs.

== Accolades ==
"Mr.Mr." was nominated for Song of the Month – March at the 2015 Gaon Chart Music Awards and Favorite K-Pop Video at the 2015 Myx Music Awards, losing to 2NE1's "Come Back Home" in both categories. It received a nomination for Digital Song Bonsang at the 29th Golden Disc Awards.

Awards and nominations
Year	Organization	Category	Result
2015	Gaon Chart Music Awards	Song of the Month (March)	Nominated
2015	Golden Disc Awards	Digital Bonsang	Nominated
2015	Myx Music Awards	Favorite K-Pop Video	Nominated

Music program wins
Program	Date	Ref.
M Countdown	March 6, 2014	
M Countdown	March 13, 2014	
Inkigayo	March 9, 2014	
Inkigayo	March 23, 2014	
Show Champion	March 12, 2014	
Show Champion	March 19, 2014	
Music Bank	March 14, 2014	
Show! Music Core	March 15, 2014	
Show! Music Core	March 22, 2014	

== Credits ==
Credits adapted from Mr.Mr. liner notes

=== Studio ===
- SM Yellow Tail Studio – recording, mixing, digital editing, additional bass arrangement
- SM Big Shot Studio – additional vocal editing
- Sterling Sound – mastering

=== Personnel ===
- SM Entertainment – executive producer
- Lee Soo-man – producer
- Kim Young-min – executive supervisor
- Girls' Generation – vocals
  - Taeyeon – background vocals
  - Jessica – background vocals
  - Sunny – background vocals
  - Tiffany – background vocals
  - Sooyoung – background vocals
  - Seohyun – background vocals
- Cho Yoon-kyung – lyrics
- Kim Hee-jeong – lyrics
- Harvey Mason Jr. – composition, arrangement
- Damon Thomas – composition, arrangement
- Andrew Hey – composition, arrangement
- Mike Daley – composition, arrangement
- Britt Burton – composition, arrangement
- Rodnae "Chikk" Bell – composition, arrangement
- Kenzie – vocal directing
- Ylva Dimberg – background vocals
- Yoo Geun-young – background vocals
- Gu Jong-pil – recording, mixing, digital editing, additional bass arrangement
- Lee Min-gyu – additional vocal editing
- Tom Coyne – mastering

== Charts ==
=== Weekly charts ===
Chart (2014)	Peak position
South Korea (Gaon)	1
South Korea (K-Pop Hot 100)	3
US World Digital Songs (Billboard)	4

=== Year-end charts ===
Chart (2014)	Position
South Korean Gaon Digital Chart	54
Taiwan (Hito Radio)	19

== Release history ==
Country	Release date	Format
South Korea	February 25, 2014	Contemporary hit radio
