= Mr.Mr. (EP) =

EP by Girls' Generation
- Released: February 24, 2014
- Recorded: December 2013 – January 2014 at SM Studios, Seoul, South Korea
- Genres: Electropop; R&B-pop
- Language: Korean
- Labels: SM; KT Music; UMG; Dreamus
- Producer: Lee Soo-man

Girls' Generation chronology
Love & Peace (2013)	Mr.Mr. (2014)	The Best (2014)

Singles from Mr.Mr.
- 1. "Mr.Mr." Released: February 25, 2014

Mr.Mr. is the fourth extended play (EP) by South Korean girl group Girls' Generation. The EP consists of six tracks and it incorporates electropop and R&B-pop music genres. It was released for digital download by SM Entertainment and KT Music on February 24, 2014. The CD and digital version were released in Hong Kong on the same day, and was made available for purchase on February 27 in South Korea. To promote the album, Girls' Generation appeared on several South Korean music programs including Music Bank and Inkigayo. The title track was released as a single. This is the final Korean EP featuring member Jessica who later left the group on September 30, 2014.

Mr.Mr. received mostly positive reviews from music critics – AllMusic's Heather Phares praised the album as showcasing the group's musical strengths, while Billboard's Jeff Benjamin positively viewed the EP as a more "impressive" release compared to the group's previous album I Got a Boy (2013). The EP peaked atop the Gaon Album Chart and became the best-selling album by a girl group of 2014 in South Korea, as well as the fifth best-selling album overall. It also entered the Japanese Oricon chart at number 11.

== Songs ==
"Mr.Mr."
A 23-second sample of the title track "Mr.Mr", an electropop and R&B-pop song

Mr.Mr. is composed of six songs, which feature "dazzling" electropop and R&B-pop genres. According to member Seohyun, the EP incorporates "exciting" R&B sounds with "cool, simple" melodies. The opening track, "Mr.Mr.", was composed by The Underdogs, who have worked with several American recording artists such as Beyoncé, Justin Timberlake, and Britney Spears. It has been described as an R&B-pop song infused with electropop. It also incorporates a hip hop beat and EDM-inspired buildups. The second song, "Goodbye," is a pop-rock track that is instrumented by snare drums and hi-hats. "Europa" (유로파), meanwhile, draws from retro late-1980s Europop and disco-pop genres.

"Wait a Minute" was described as a "bouncy" jazz-pop track with "beautiful [harmonizations]", and "Back Hug" (Korean: 백허그) features a "simple, snappy" R&B production. The EP concludes with "Soul" – an uptempo Korean version of the group's first original Chinese recording, "Find Your Soul", released in 2013. The original version was used as the theme song on commercials for the Korean MMORPG video game, Blade & Soul, in Chinese-language markets across Asia.

== Release and promotion ==
Mr.Mr. was released for digital download worldwide on February 24, 2014, under SM Entertainment and KT Music, while the physical version was made available in South Korea on February 27, 2014, by the same labels. The title track served as the EP's lead single and it was released to South Korean mainstream radio on February 25, 2014.

To promote the EP, Girls' Generation appeared on several South Korean music programs, the first being Mnet's M Countdown, where they performed "Mr.Mr." and "Wait a Minute" live on March 6, 2014. The group also appeared on KBS's Music Bank, MBC's Show! Music Core and SBS's Inkigayo on March 7, 8 and 9, 2014, respectively. On Show! Music Core, the group performed "Mr.Mr." and "Wait a Minute", while on Music Bank, they performed the title track and "Back Hug".

== Reception ==
Professional ratings
Review scores
Source	Rating
AllMusic	3.5/5 stars
Billboard	82/100
IZM	2.5/5 stars
Weiv	8.5/10

Upon its release, Mr.Mr received mostly positive reviews from music critics. Heather Phares from AllMusic labelled the EP "a set of songs that offers something for every kind of Girls' Generation and expands their musical reach." Phares further praised the EP for helping the group to be an outstanding case of Korean popular music. Writing for Billboard, Jeff Benjamin named the six songs of the EP "strong" and called it a more "impressive effort" compared to the group's 2013 album I Got a Boy. He also deemed the track list "a tight bundle of songs that still see the group dipping and experimenting into new sonic territory, but possibly more focused than ever." Benjamin also wrote an article for Fuse, on which he complimented the album's musical styles as "short, sweet, but strong." Music critics from webzine Weiv praised the concepts and musical styles of Mr.Mr; critic Subtlety said that all of its musical styles are evenly distributed, and felt that it did a good job of showcasing the 'third path of idols' by not only embracing sexy or cute, but rather both. On the other hand, Kim Do-heon from online magazine IZM compared the EP to the group's 2011 album The Boys for its "balance of musical competence and appeal to mass popularity", but found the songs to be inadequate. He concluded that the group needed to "[set] a clear direction for the future" after the "mistake" of I Got a Boy, and Mr.Mr was not the answer.

=== Commercial performance ===
Mr.Mr. was a commercial success domestically. It claimed the top spot on the South Korean Gaon Album Chart on the chart issue dated February 23 – March 1, 2014. It remained on the peak position for one further week, beating 2NE1's Crush. Mr.Mr. came second on the Gaon Monthly Album Chart of February, selling 87,824 physical copies, only behind B.A.P's First Sensibility, which sold over 91,000 units. The following month, it topped the Gaon Monthly Album Chart with sales of 70,295 copies. It was placed at number 47 on the Gaon Monthly Album Chart of April with a further 1,125 units sold. Overall, Mr.Mr. was the fifth highest-selling physical album and the best-selling album by a girl group of 2014 in South Korea with total sales figures of 163,209 copies.

Mr.Mr. debuted at number 110 on the US Billboard 200 chart, selling 3,000 copies in its first week. By doing so, the EP became Girls' Generation's highest-charting release on the Billboard 200 following subgroup TTS's Twinkle, which charted at number 126 in 2012. Mr.Mr. also peaked at number three on the World Albums, and number 23 on the Independent Albums charts. In Japan, it peaked at number eleven on the Oricon Albums Chart.

The six songs from the EP debuted on the South Korean Gaon Digital Chart: "Mr.Mr." (number one), "Goodbye" (number ten), "Wait a Minute" (number 18), "Back Hug" (number 24), "Europa" (number 25), and "Soul" (number 33).

== Track listing ==
Credits adapted from Mr.Mr. liner notes

Mr.Mr.
No.	Title	Lyrics	Music	Arrangement	Length
1.	"Mr.Mr."	Jo Yoon-kyung; Kim Hee-jeong	Harvey Mason Jr. (The Underdogs); Damon Thomas (The Underdogs); Andrew Hey; Mike Daley; Britt Burton; Rodnae "Chikk" Bell	The Underdogs	3:55
2.	"Goodbye"	Hwang Hyun (MonoTree)	Lindy Robbins; Brent Paschke; Jenna Andrews	Lindy Robbins; Brent Paschke; Jenna Andrews	3:14
3.	"Europa" (Korean: 유로파; RR: Yuropa)	Kenzie	Kenzie	Kenzie	3:22
4.	"Wait a Minute"	G-High (Joombas); Lee Joo-hyoung (Joombas); Hwang Hyun (Joombas); Agnes Shin (Joombas); Mo-ul))	G-High (Joombas); Lee Joo-hyoung (Joombas)	G-High (Joombas); Lee Joo-hyoung (Joombas)	3:25
5.	"Back Hug" (Korean: 백허그; RR: Baekheogeu)	Jo Yoon-kyung	Ingrid Skretting; Jesper Borgen	Hwang-gundan (Hwang Seong-je, Nickel, Jung Soo-min)	4:09
6.	"Soul" (Korean version)	Jo Yoon-kyung	Anne Judith Wik; Nermin Harambašić; Ronny Vidar Svendsen; Lukas Nathanson; Lee Hyun-seung (Red Rocket); Dominic "DOM" Rodriguez (Red Rocket)	Red Rocket	3:47
Total length:					21:52

== Personnel ==
Credits are adapted from Mr.Mr. liner notes

- Lee Soo-man – producer
- Tom Coyne – mastering engineer
- Steven Myungkyu Lee – English supervisor
- Taeyeon – vocals, background vocals (track 1, 3)
- Jessica – vocals, background vocals (track 1, 3, 4)
- Sunny – vocals, background vocals (track 1, 3)
- Tiffany – vocals, background vocals (track 1, 3, 4)
- Hyoyeon – vocals
- Yuri – vocals
- Sooyoung – vocals, background vocals (track 1)
- Yoona – vocals
- Seohyun – vocals, background vocals (track 1, 3)
- Kenzie – vocal director (track 1), director (track 3), keyboard (track 3)
- Ylva Dimberg – background vocals (track 1)
- Yang Geun-young – background vocals (track 1, 6)
- Gu Jong-pil – recording engineer (track 1, 4), mixing engineer (track 1, 2), additional bass arrangement (track 1)
- Lee Min-gyu – additional vocal editing (track 1)
- Lee Joo-hyung – vocal director (track 2), Pro Tools operator (track 2, 4), additional vocal editing (track 2, 4), director (track 4), background vocals (track 4)
- Choi Young-kyung – background vocals (track 2, 4)
- Jung Ui-seok – recording engineer (track 2, 3, 4), mixing engineer (track 3, 4)
- Kim Jeong-bae – guitar (track 3)
- Jung Eun-kyung – additional vocal editing (track 3)
- Choi Hoon – bass guitar (track 4, 6)
- Jung Soo-wan – guitar (track 4)
- Yoo Ji-sang – keyboard (track 4)
- Hwang Sung-jae – director (track 5), bass guitar (track 5), Pro Tools operator (track 5)
- Seo Mi-rae – background vocals (track 5), additional vocal editing (track 5)
- Lee Sung-ryul – guitar (track 5)
- Lee Na-il – strings arrangement and conductor (track 5)
- Nickel – strings arrangement and conductor (track 5), Pro Tools operator (track 5)
- Yoong – strings (track 5)
- Jung Soo-min – Pro Tools operator (track 5)
- Lee Sung-ho – recording engineer (track 5)
- Oh Sung-geun – recording engineer (track 5)
- Son Joo-yong – assistant recording engineer (track 5)
- Nam Goong-jin – mixing engineer (track 5, 6)
- Red Rocket – director (track 6), keyboard (track 6), additional vocal editing (track 6)
- Ryu Hyun-woo – guitar (track 6)
- Kang Hae-gu – recording engineer (track 6)
- Kim Young-min – executive supervisor

== Charts ==
=== Weekly charts ===
Chart (2014)	Peak position
Japanese Albums (Oricon)	11
South Korean Albums (Gaon)	1
US Billboard 200	110
US Independent Albums (Billboard)	23
US World Albums (Billboard)	3

=== Year-end charts ===
Chart (2014)	Position
South Korean Albums (Gaon)	5

== Release history ==
Region	Date	Format	Label
Various	February 24, 2014	Digital download	SM Entertainment; KT Music
Hong Kong	February 24, 2014	CD	Universal Music Group
South Korea	February 27, 2014	CD	SM Entertainment; KT Music
