= Mike Greene (arts executive) =

American arts executive

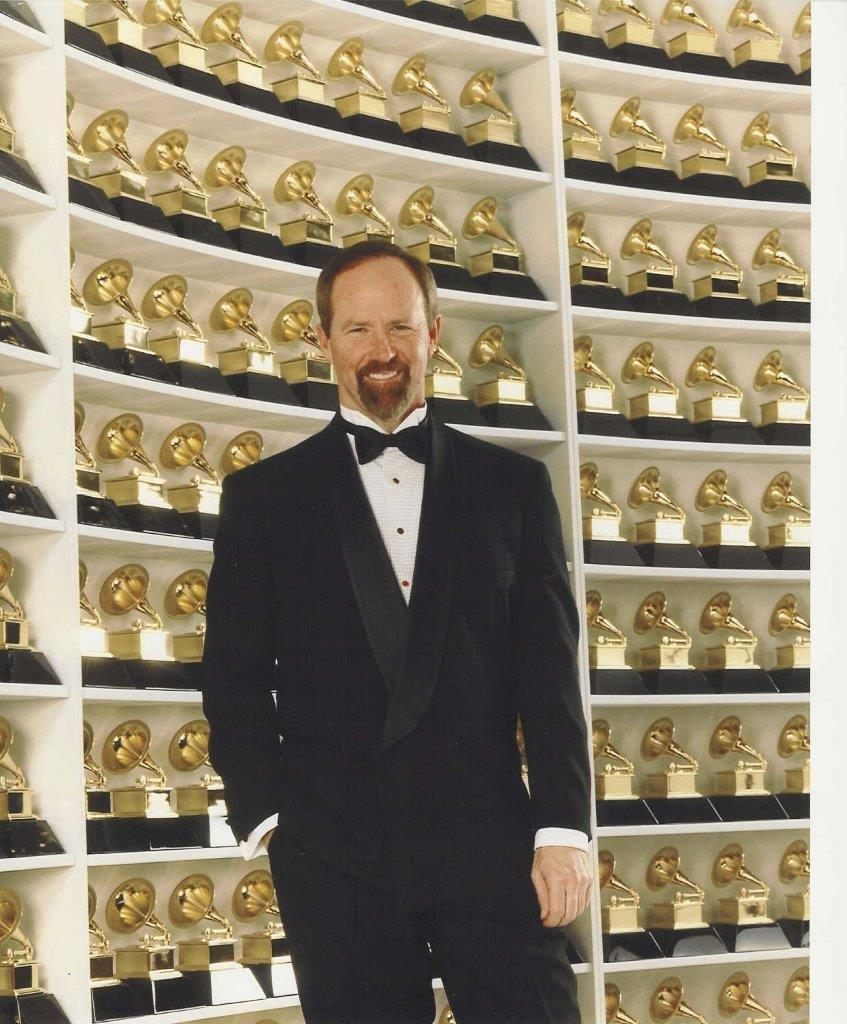
- Greene in 2022
- Born: Charles Michael Greene; United States
- Occupation: Arts executive

Mike Greene, also known as Charles Michael Greene, is an American arts executive who served as head of the National Academy of Recording Arts and Sciences (NARAS) from 1985 to 2002, and the president and CEO of Artist Tribe and myMuse.

== Early years ==
Greene earned his BBA in Business from West Georgia College, studied ceramics at the University of Georgia, later earned a special Doctorate in Music from the University of Southern California, and was awarded Honorary Doctorates from both Temple University and the Berklee School of Music.

The son of a Big Band leader, Greene began his career as a recording artist, singer-songwriter and producer with Warner Brothers, Mercury Records, and GRC Recordings. Greene built and was CEO of Apogee Studios, as well as publishing companies working with artists such as Ray Charles, James Brown, Keith Jarrett, Lionel Richie, Sarah Vaughan, Kenny Loggins, Sammy Hagar, Kansas, and many more. Greene was Executive V.P. of Crawford Communications; CEO of the Video Music Channel; GM of WVEU television network in Atlanta; CEO of the National Academy of Recording Arts and Sciences; founder of Musicares and the Grammy Foundation; and also CEO of Artist Tribe and MyMuse Partners. He also played Saxophone, Keyboards and sang in the band Mike Greene, which released several recordings between 1975 and 2012.

Greene founded the Cable Marketing Group Ltd. and Total Entertainment & Media Productions, Inc. These were two of the country's first cable consulting, production and ad placement companies.

In 1981, Greene built The Video Music Channel into one of the world's first cable video music networks. VMC was a national pioneer in multi-genre video music programming and live event production, with over 4 million subscribers. Next, VMC added traditional VHF and UHF television stations into its network, and Greene was named VP/GM of the network's flagship station, WVEU (UHF) in Atlanta, Georgia.

During this same period, Greene served as Senior Vice President of Universal Video Corporation in Indianapolis, Indiana producing 16 hours of original programming daily for the first Direct Broadcast Satellite Service, U.S.C.I. (the Prudential and General Instruments venture).

Next, Greene helped build Crawford Post Production, Satellite Services, Communications and Interactive Services Companies, in Atlanta. While Greene was Executive V.P., Crawford became one of the nation's largest media production companies serving clients such as Coca-Cola, IBM, Turner Broadcasting, the United States Department of Defense, and Tribune Broadcasting among thousands of others. Greene was President of Crawford-Greene, Inc. Crawford is still a leader in these fields.

Greene served as a consultant to the Ministry of Culture of the People's Republic of China.

== Career at NARAS ==
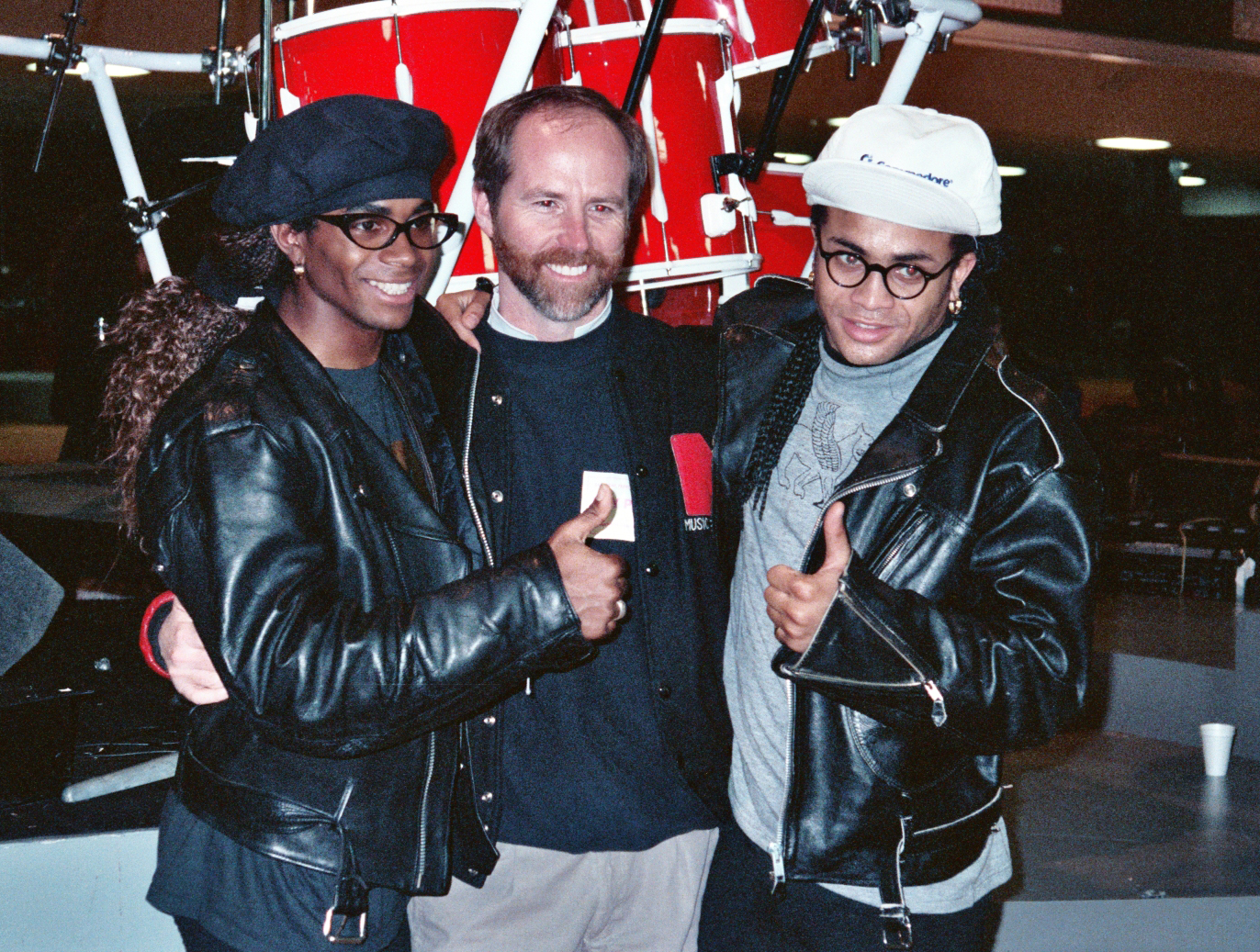
Greene (center) with Milli Vanilli faces Fab Morvan and Rob Pilatus in February 1990

In 1986, Greene was elected as Chairman of National Academy of Recording Arts and Sciences (NARAS), made famous for its annual Grammy Awards. In 1988, Greene was named the academy's first President/CEO and served as CEO for 14 years. Greene led the growth of membership from 3,200 to over 27,000, built 12 regional offices, and launched the Latin Academy of Recording Arts & Sciences. During his presidency, academy revenue increased by 30 fold.

Under Greene's leadership, the Grammy Awards ceremony grew from being syndicated in 14 countries to over 180. Greene also established the academy's Political Advocacy Initiatives. NARAS emerged as a voice for music and the arts in Washington D.C. and the state houses on issues such as:

- Intellectual Property Rights and Copyright Infringement
- First Amendment protection
- Music and Arts Education
- Preservation of funding for the national arts agencies
- Digital Music Distribution and Artist Rights
- Archiving and Preservation of the world's musical legacy

Under Greene's Academy leadership, NARAS developed:

- Latin Academy of Recording Arts & Sciences
- Grammy in the Schools
- Grammy High School Jazz Bands and Choir Ensembles
- Grammy.com and the Live Grammy Webcasts
- The Grammy Nominees CD series
- Leonard Bernstein Centers for Learning
- National Music Industry Coalition
- Grammy National Mentoring Partnership
- National Music Education Coalition
- Grammy Living History Video Archive
- Grammy Music on Film Preservation Initiative
- Grammy Foundation and MusiCares Foundation
- NARAS Journal and Grammy Magazine
- Grammy Concert Series for Children
- Grammy Signature Schools
- Grammy Gateway and Grammy Sessions
- Grammy Preservation and Recording Technology Timeline

=== The Grammy Foundation ===
During Greene's tenure, the academy produced hundreds of educational events across the nation and the world. Greene founded and was President of two 501C-3 Foundations while presiding over the academy. The Grammy Foundation spent over $4 million annually to provide grants and educational programs reaching over 2 million people. Their work in Congress helped launch the National Recording Registry designed to preserve historically significant recordings, the National Coalition for Music Education, and coalitions to save the National Endowment for the Arts, National Endowment for the Humanities, PBS, and NPR.

== MusiCares ==
In 1990, Greene founded MusiCares to provide financial grants, substance abuse intervention, treatment and educational programs to music professionals in need worldwide. MusiCares has distributed well over $20 million since its inception. Greene was also the national spokesperson for the National Association of Music Therapists, now known as the American Music Therapy Association.

== Artist Tribe ==
Greene founded Artist Tribe, LLC in 2005 and currently serves as its president and CEO. Artist Tribe is an innovation enterprise which houses seven operating divisions serving the creative and cultural communities at large. The Artist Tribe Foundation is involved in the field of Arts Mentoring, Education, Arts and Wellness, and produces culturally significant documentaries. The most recent is Girls in the Band.

== Ceramics ==
Greene is a ceramicist and instructor, with works in the permanent collection of the High Museum of Art.

== Accolades ==
Greene was inducted into the Georgia Music Hall of Fame, receiving a Georgy Award for his contributions to music. Greene received a special Doctorate in Music from the University of Southern California and an Honorary Doctorate in Music and Arts Education from Berklee College of Music in Boston.

== Discography ==
- Pale, Pale Moon (1975)
- Midnight Mirage (1976)
- Escape From The Woodshed (2009)
- Pocket Of A Thief (2011)
- Lonely Monster (2011)
- On Tenterhooks (2011)
- Believe (2011)
- A Delicate Balance (2012)

Preceded by	President of The Recording Academy; 1988 - 2002	Succeeded by Neil Portnow
