= The Recording Academy =

American music organization

- National Academy of Recording Arts and Sciences
- Recording Academy Logo
- Abbreviation: NARAS
- Formation: 1957; 69 years ago
- Type: learned academy, trade association, music organization and nonprofit organization
- Legal status: 501(c)6
- Headquarters: Santa Monica, California, U.S.
- Location: 3030 Olympic Boulevard
- Products: Grammy Awards
- Members: 30,000
- CEO: Harvey Mason Jr.
- Key people: Panos A. Panay
- Affiliations: The Latin Recording Academy; MusiCares; Grammy Museum
- Website: grammy.com/about

National Academy of Recording Arts & Sciences, Inc. (NARAS), doing business as the Recording Academy, is an American nonprofit organization and learned academy of musicians, producers, recording engineers, and other musical professionals. It was established in 1957 and is widely known for its Grammy Awards, which recognize achievements in the music industry of songs and music that are popular worldwide. The Recording Academy is a founding partner of the Grammy Museum, a non-profit organization whose stated mission is preserving and educating about music history and its significance. The Recording Academy also founded MusiCares, a charity with the stated goal of impacting the health and welfare of the music community. The Recording Academy's advocacy team lobbies for music creators' rights at the local, state, and federal levels.

== History ==
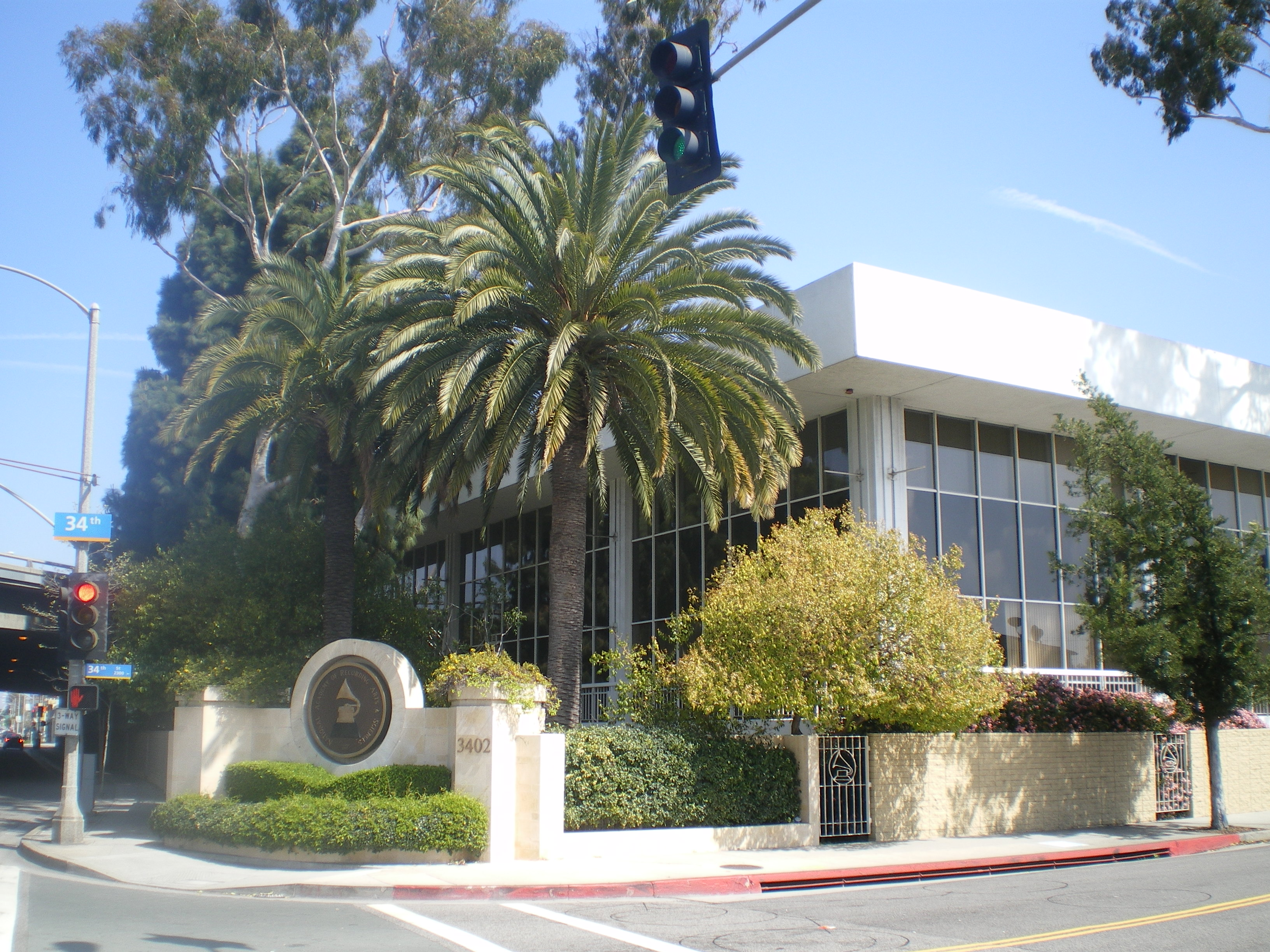
The Recording Academy's former headquarters in Santa Monica, California

The origin of the academy dates back to the beginning of the 1950s Hollywood Walk of Fame project. The Hollywood Chamber of Commerce asked the help of major recording industry executives in compiling a list of people in the music business who should be honored by Walk of Fame stars. The music committee, made up of these executives, compiled a list, but as they worked, they realized there were many more talented industry people who would not qualify to be recognized with a Hollywood Boulevard bronze star.

The founding committee members included Jesse Kaye, MGM Records; Lloyd Dunn and Richard Jones, Capitol Records; Sonny Burke and Milt Gabler, Decca Records; Dennis Farnon, RCA Records; and Axel Stordahl, Paul Weston, and Doris Day from Columbia Records. This was the start of the academy and also of the Grammy Awards.

The Recording Academy was formally established in 1957.

The 1st Annual Grammy Awards was held simultaneously in two locations on May 4, 1959 – Beverly Hilton Hotel in Beverly Hills, California, and Park Sheraton Hotel in New York City, and 28 Grammys were awarded. The number of awards given grew and fluctuated over the years with categories added and removed, at one time reaching over 100. The second Grammy Awards, also held in 1959, was the first ceremony to be televised, but the ceremony was not aired live until the 13th Annual Grammy Awards in 1971.

In 1997, the Recording Academy, under Michael Greene, launched The Latin Recording Academy, which produces the Latin Grammy Awards. Neil Portnow later served as president and CEO of the academy from 2002 to 2019. Deborah Dugan was his replacement, taking over on August 1, 2019. and is the first woman to lead the organization. Dugan was removed from her position on January 16, 2020 after organizational claims of misconduct against her assistant, though she claimed she was ousted while experiencing conflicts in trying to reform the organization, and other matters were revealed to her, including a sexual assault claim from an artist against Portnow. Harvey Mason Jr. held interim president/CEO duties for the organization from 2020 to 2021. He was named CEO in June 2021.

Since Mason's tenure, the Recording Academy has established the following initiatives:

- In March 2020, MusiCares established the COVID-19 Relief Fund. According to MusiCares, the fund was created to help struggling music creators through the COVID-19 pandemic crisis.
- In May 2020, the organization hired its first-ever Chief Diversity, Equity, and Inclusion officer, Valeisha Butterfield Jones.
- In June 2020, the GRAMMYs revised rules and processes ahead of the 63rd GRAMMY Awards. Changes include the removal of the term "urban", renaming Best Urban Contemporary Album to Best Progressive R&B Album, renaming Best Rap/Sung Performance to Best Melodic Rap Performance and within the Latin music field, Latin Pop Album was renamed Best Latin Pop Or Urban Album and Latin Rock, Urban Or Alternative Album was renamed to Best Latin Rock Or Alternative Album.
- In July 2020, the Academy joined Representatives Linda T. Sánchez (D-Calif.) and Representative Ron Estes (R-Kansas) to introduce the Help Independent Tracks Succeed (HITS) Act. According to the bipartisan bill, it allows independent music makers to expense the cost of new studio recordings on their taxes.
- In March 2021, it established the Songwriters & Composers Wing, a new wing made to recognize "all genres of songwriters and amplify their role in policy discussions that seek fair compensation for creators."
- In April 2021, the GRAMMYs eliminated the nominations review committee to provide more transparency in its voting process.
- In November 2021, ahead of the 64th GRAMMY nominations, the Recording Academy expanded the number of nominees in the General Field categories from eight to ten. According to the organization, the expansion would bring in more genres and make the nominations more representative of the industry.
- In June 2025, the Recording Academy introduced two new awards: Best Album Cover (which merged with the Grammy Award for Best Boxed or Special Limited Edition Package) and Best Traditional Country Album (and renamed the current Best Country Album Grammy award to Best Contemporary Country Album). The academy also changed eligibility for the Grammy Award for Best New Artist, allowing contributors credited on an Album of the Year–nominated project to qualify for the award if they had not previously been nominated in that category. It also expanded eligibility for packaging Grammy awards to albums sold directly to fans.

In June 2021, the Recording Academy named Valeisha Butterfield Jones and Panos A. Panay as Co-Presidents, the first time the Academy has had multiple leaders in its history.

In 2022, the academy endorsed the bipartisan Promoting Peace, Education, and Cultural Exchange (PEACE) Through Music Diplomacy Act. In September 2023, it co-launched the Global Music Diplomacy Initiative in partnership with U.S. Secretary of State Antony Blinken at the State Department.

== Grammy Awards ==
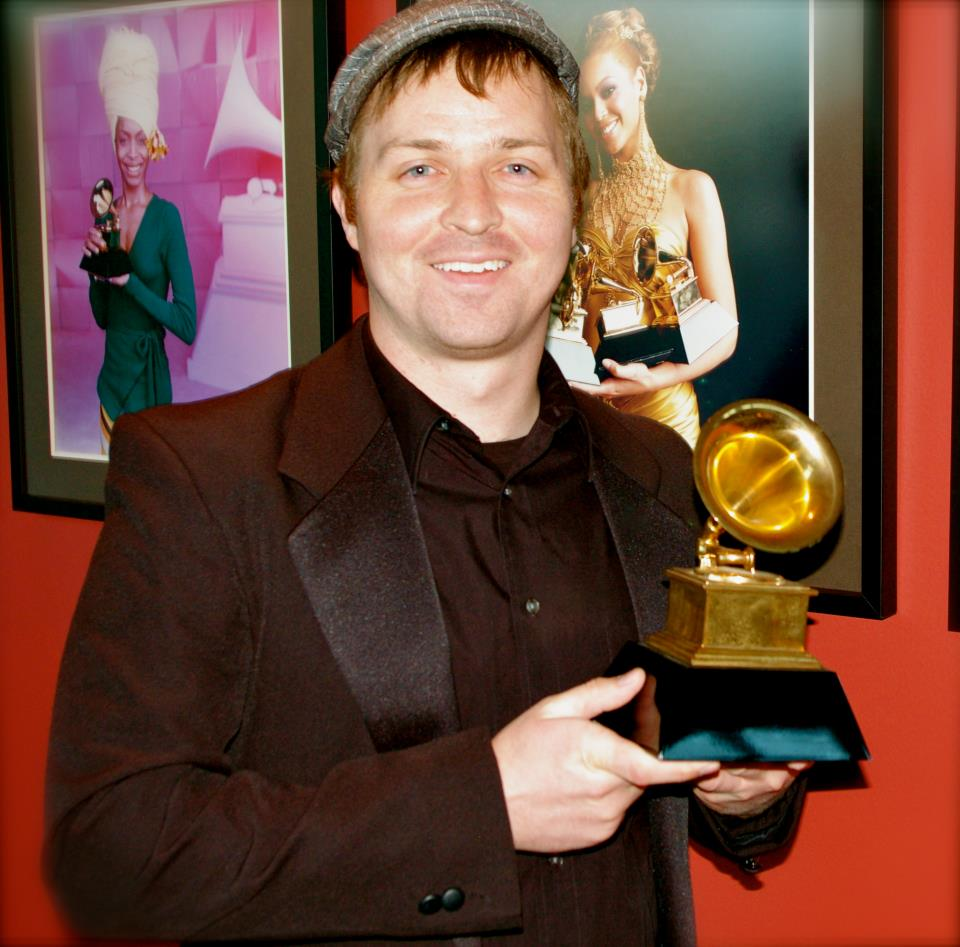
Josh Knight and his Grammy Award (2012)

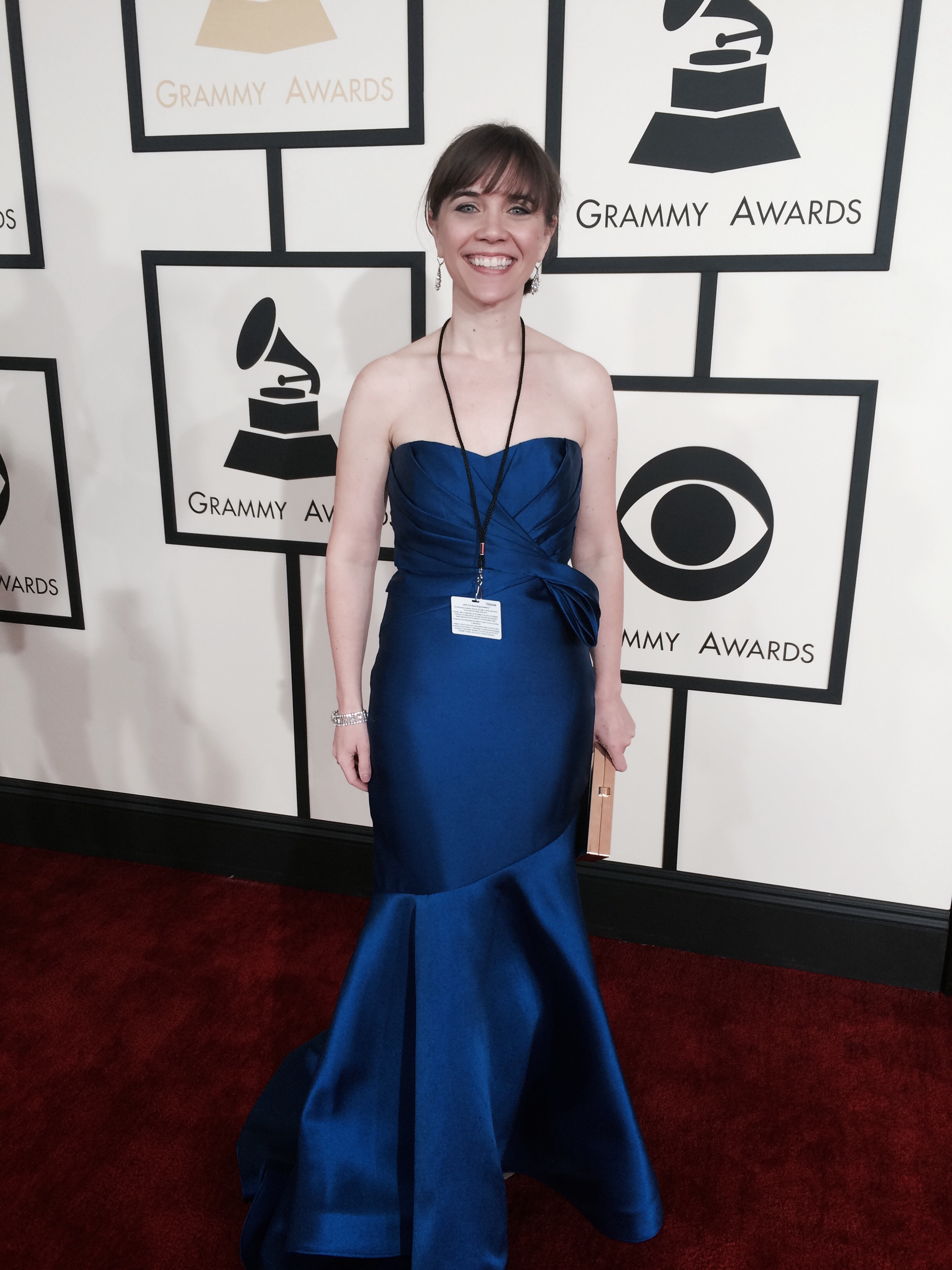
Patricia Price at the 57th Annual Grammy Awards

The Grammy Awards are awards presented by the Recording Academy to recognize achievements in the music industry.

== Organization ==
=== Membership ===
The Recording Academy's membership is categorized into three category types: voting members, professional members and Grammy U members. Voting members include recording artists and other music creators, including songwriters, producers and audio engineers. Professional members include music industry professionals whose work supports music creators, such as music executives, representation (like agents and managers) and educators. Grammy U members consist of emerging professionals and creatives who are pursuing careers in the music industry. Unlike voting members, professional members do not vote on the Grammy Awards.

In 2019, the Recording Academy introduced a new membership model, marking its first change in 60 years. This new peer-reviewed model operates on an annual cycle and was created in collaboration with the organization's task force on diversity and inclusion.

=== Producers and Engineers Wing ===
According to the Recording Academy, the Producers and Engineers Wing (P&E Wing) is a part of the academy made up of producers, engineers, mixers, and other technically involved professionals. The producers and engineers wing addresses various aspects of issues facing the recording profession. The P&E Wing also advocates for the use of professional usage of recording technology as well as the preservation of recordings.

The members of this division make up a large portion of those who vote on the Grammy Awards each year.

=== Grammy University Network ===
According to the Recording Academy, The Grammy University Network (Grammy U) is an organization for college students who are pursuing a career in the music industry. It offers forms of networking, interactive educational experiences and programs, advice from music professionals, and internship opportunities.

=== MusiCares ===
The Recording Academy supports the MusiCares Foundation, a philanthropic organization which provides money and services to musicians in an emergency or crisis.

=== Chapters ===
The academy has twelve chapters in various locations throughout the United States. The twelve chapters are in Atlanta, Chicago, Florida, Los Angeles, Memphis, Nashville, New York City, the Pacific Northwest, Philadelphia, San Francisco, Texas, and Washington D.C. Tammy Susan Hurt is the first LGBT Chapter President to have served on the board of the Atlanta Chapter since 2005. The Washington branch organized the 2018 event Grammys on the Hill to coordinate passage of the Music Modernization Act in Congress.

== See also ==
- The Latin Recording Academy
- Global Music Diplomacy Initiative
- Grammy Museum
- List of music organizations in the United States
