= PTTOW! =

- Status: Active
- Founder: Roman Tsunder, Terry Hardy, and Jim Sullos
- Area: CEOs, CMOs and Icons
- Website: www.pttow.com

PTTOW! is an invite-only community and summit for CEO's, CMO's and Icons, with more than 230 groups spanning 70 major industries. It was founded by Roman Tsunder, Terry Hardy, and Jim Sullos in 2009.

== Participants and Events ==
Over the years, PTTOW! has attracted many different speakers to their invite-only events.

The year-round community and summit includes CEOs, CMOs, leading entrepreneurs, as well as artists and athletes. Speakers have included the 14th Dalai Lama at the 2011 summit, journalist Katie Couric and singer Meghan Trainor at the 2019 summit, and Van Jones at the 2022 summit. At the 2022 summit, PTTOW! covered topics such as "NFTs, web3, the new paradigm of leadership, ableism & inclusion".
