= Neil Portnow =

American music industry executive

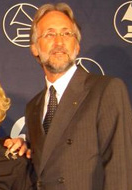

Background information
- Origin: Great Neck, New York, U.S.
- Occupations: former President of The Recording Academy former President of West Coast division of Jive Records

Neil R. Portnow is an American music industry executive who served as the chairman and CEO of The Recording Academy and MusiCares from 2002 to 2019. Prior to that, Portnow was the vice-president of the West Coast division of Jive Records and Arista Records.

== Early career and education ==
Portnow grew up in Great Neck, New York. He played the bass guitar in a high school rock band, The Savages, who released a 45 rpm record "Cheating on me"/"Best thing you ever had" on Red Fox Records. The record did not achieve serious commercial success, but was included in a compilation of garage bands.

Portnow graduated from The George Washington University in 1971, where he served as president of the GW Student Association.

Later in 1971, he formed his own firm, Portnow-Miller Company, Inc., where he served as president. His client list included RCA Records, The Entertainment Company, Babylon Records, and Playboy Records. Portnow's services incorporated radio promotion, marketing and creative services, music publishing, and record production.

The Screen Gems Publishing Group, later acquired by EMI, named him manager of talent acquisitions and development in 1972. He established the record production division for the company, working with producers, arrangers, musicians, and songs from writer/artists including Fleetwood Mac, Carole King, Melissa Manchester, and Cat Stevens. Portnow also negotiated domestic and international agreements in both the recording and music publishing areas.

A staff producer for RCA Records, Portnow was promoted to the post of executive producer in 1977. He was transferred from New York to West Coast operations in the newly created position of division vice president, artist and repertoire. He was responsible for negotiations that included a distribution arrangement for Elton John's Rocket Records.

In April 1979, he became the senior vice president for 20th Century Fox Records, and was promoted to president the following January. During Portnow's tenure the organization delivered three gold albums and a gold single from Grammy Stephanie Mills.

In March 1982, Portnow was named vice president, artists and repertoire, West Coast for Arista Records by Clive Davis. As the principal West Coast executive, he was responsible for all West Coast activity and he functioned as general manager for the company. He also worked on Whitney Houston's debut album in addition to projects involving acts such as Barry Manilow, Billy Ocean, the Thompson Twins, and Dionne Warwick.

In February 1985, Portnow was appointed vice president, artists and repertoire, for EMI America Records where he was responsible for all A&R activity worldwide. In addition to supervising all new artist acquisitions, Portnow worked with artists including David Bowie, Sheena Easton, Corey Hart, Nona Hendryx, and Evelyn "Champagne" King. He helped establish a black music department, played a role in the signing of superstar Robert Palmer, and brought platinum and gold album recording artists Pet Shop Boys and Najee to the company.

In 1987, he was named music supervisor for Frank Mancuso Jr.'s production of Permanent Record for Paramount Pictures. Music from the film was on the Epic Records soundtrack album, which included the first film underscore as well as songs by Joe Strummer. Throughout his career, Portnow has been involved in many soundtrack projects, including Ghostbusters, 9 To 5, The Stunt Man, The World's Greatest Lover, and the 1986 hit About Last Night.

== Jive Records ==
Portnow moved in 1989 to Jive Records, where he oversaw the expansion of their West Coast operation. In this position, he played a small role in the careers of known acts of the late 1990s and early 2000s, including Britney Spears, NSYNC, and R. Kelly. He worked alongside Jive's president Clive Calder who ran Jive's parent company, the Zomba Label Group.

== President of the Recording Academy and controversies ==
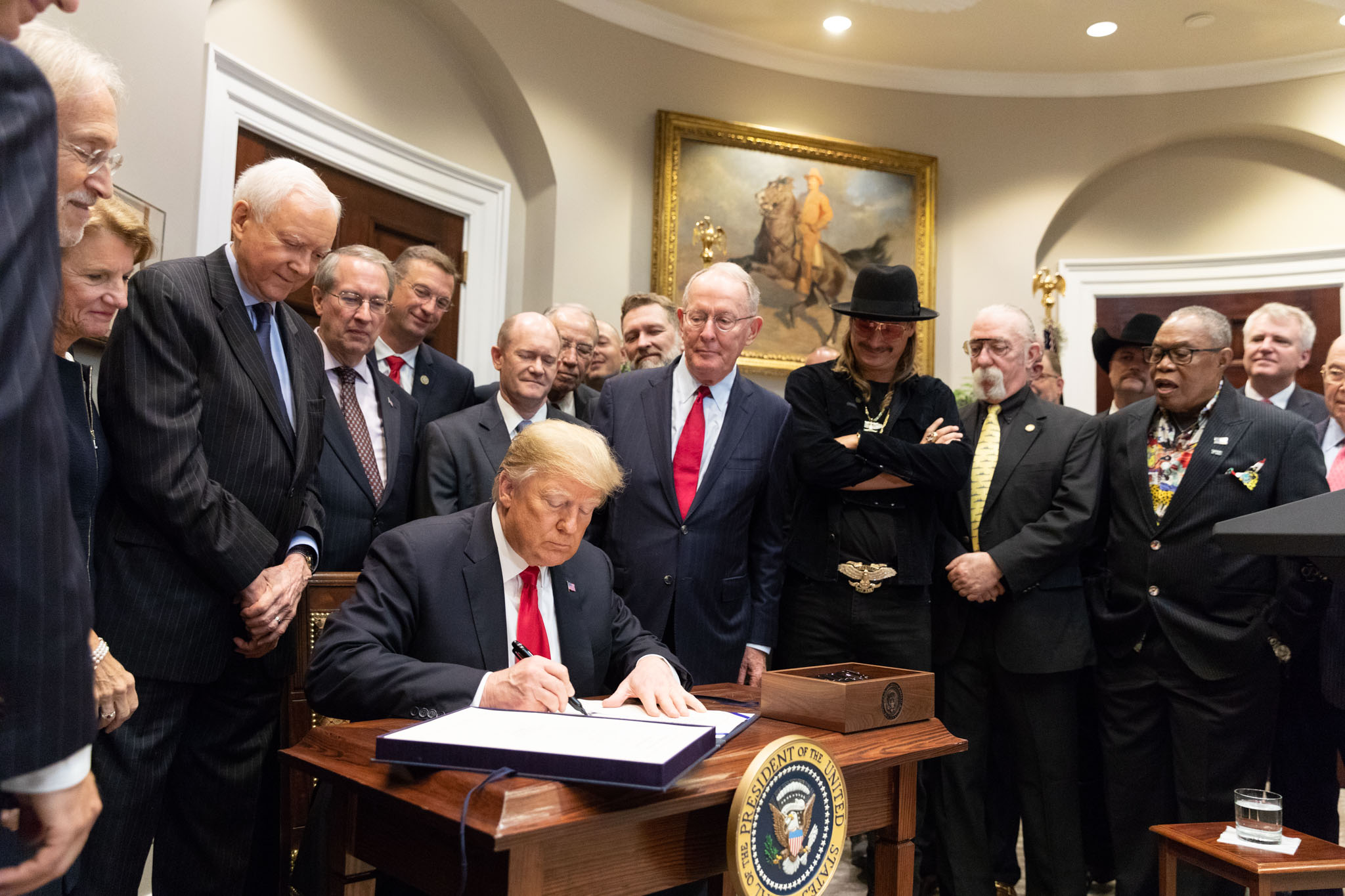
Portnow (to the left of US President Donald Trump) as the Music Modernization Act is signed into law in 2018

In November 2002, Portnow became the president of the National Academy of Recording Arts and Sciences (NARAS) (also known as The Recording Academy) – replacing C. Michael Greene, who served as president from 1988 to 2002. At the 45th Annual Grammy Awards, he made his first Grammy night address as president. He was named President/CEO in September 2007.

Portnow led efforts to help musicians affected by Hurricane Katrina through the academy's MusiCares Foundation. He has also played a significant role in the digital music revolution, lobbying on Capitol Hill regarding artist compensation rights, particularly with regard to the Performance Rights Act, which requires artists to be paid for airplay on the radio. During the 51st Annual Grammy Awards in 2009, Portnow spoke about the election of President Barack Obama and encouraged his administration to add a cabinet-level position for Secretary of the Arts.

In 2018, Neil Portnow announced he would step down at the end of his contract on July 31, 2019.

=== Grammy Museum and Foundation ===
As President/CEO, Portnow oversaw the 2008 opening of the Grammy Museum at L.A. Live in Los Angeles, as well as its three branches. He also led the merger of the Grammy Museum and Grammy Foundation into the newly expanded Grammy Museum, which positions itself as offering the best of each organization's initiatives in preservation, education, exhibitions, and public programming.

=== MusiCares ===
Portnow has also served as President/CEO of MusiCares. During his tenure he launched MusiCares' 20th Anniversary Giving Campaign. The campaign helped raise more than $12 million for the nonprofit organization, with the stated purpose of ensuring music people have a place to turn in times of financial, medical, and personal need.

=== Advocacy ===
Portnow is responsible for establishing an Advocacy & Government Relations department at the Recording Academy and increasing the organization's advocacy outreach. As an advocate for music people, he has managed strategic advocacy positions at the national, state, and local levels—both governmental and within music and its related industries. Under Portnow's leadership, the Advocacy department created Grammys on the Hill Advocacy Day as a companion to the Grammys on the Hill Awards event. Furthermore, in 2017, the Recording Academy's District Advocate day became the largest grassroots initiative for music in the nation under Portnow's direction. For the first time in history, music creators from all 50 states met with congressional offices in their home districts to discuss legislative issues affecting the music industry, including performance rights, copyright reform, and the impact of digital services.

In October 2018, Portnow was present at the White House for the signing of the Music Modernization Act. He had been a vocal supporter of getting the bill passed and signed into law.

=== 60th Grammy Awards controversies ===
In May 2018, it was revealed that money intended for the Recording Academy charity MusiCares was siphoned off to pay for the cost overruns of hosting the 60th Annual Grammy Awards at New York City's Madison Square Garden.

Concerning the controversies of hosting that year's Grammy Awards in New York, Dana Tomarken, the former executive vice president of the MusiCares foundation claimed wrongful termination. She alleges that she was fired for pushing back against the academy's "boys club". She claimed that by having the MusiCares Person of the Year Tribute to Fleetwood Mac at Radio City Music Hall, the event had to forgo its traditional VIP dinner and silent auction. She had already been offered a deal to have the event at the Barclays Center in Brooklyn. The Barclays Center is owned by AEG, which competes directly with The Madison Square Garden Company which owns Madison Square Garden and Radio City. Irving Azoff who then had a joint venture with the Madison Square Garden Company told Tomarken that the event could not be held at Barclays and had to be held at Radio City. Oak View Group, which is associated with Azoff, received 300 of the highest price tickets to the MusiCares event at Radio City. Oak View Group was supposed to sell them as a package deal which also included tickets to the Grammy Awards itself. MusiCares was promised to receive $1.5 million from those tickets according to Tomarken. Those 300 tickets were never sold and were then returned to MusiCares, which resulted in a loss.

Portnow also came under heavy criticism at the 60th Grammy Awards for suggesting that women in the music industry need to "step up". He later apologized for the statement saying that it was a poor choice of words. The following year, Dua Lipa referred to his comments when she won the Grammy Award for Best New Artist.

=== Sexual misconduct allegations ===
In January 2020 in the wake of the ouster of Portnow's replacement, Deborah Dugan, as the new president of the Recording Academy, the organization was accused of covering up an alleged sexual assault by Portnow of an artist after a Carnegie Hall concert, which Dugan cited as the reason for Portnow's departure.

In November 2023, an unnamed woman filed a lawsuit against Portnow in Manhattan under New York's Adult Survivors Act, accusing him of sexual assault. The suit was also filed against the Recording Academy, alleging negligence from the organization. A spokesperson for Portnow called the accusations "completely false", and that the Academy "continue to believe the claims to be without merit". In May 2024, on the advice of her lawyers, the plaintiff filed to have her lawsuit dismissed, after it was revealed that the defense intended to file a motion that would result in the reveal of her identity.

== Philanthropy ==
Portnow sat on the 2018 executive board, Music & Entertainment Industry for the City of Hope, where he previously served a three-year term as President of the Music and Entertainment Industry chapter from 2000 to 2002, raising funds for the world-renowned cancer treatment and research center. In October 2003, the City Of Hope presented Portnow with its top philanthropy honor, the Spirit of Life Award, at a gala event that raised more than $2.3 million to benefit research and treatment efforts.

== Honors ==
In May 2017, Portnow was awarded an Honorary Doctorate of Music from Berklee College of Music.

He was named the UJA-Federation of NY's Music Visionary of the Year at its annual luncheon in June 2014. Other honors include the George Washington University's Distinguished Alumni Achievement Award, and inclusion in Billboard magazine's Power 100 and the Variety500 industry lists.

Cultural offices
Preceded by Michael Greene	President of The Recording Academy; 2002–2019	Succeeded by Deborah Dugan
