= All in One (Whigfield album) =

All In One

Greatest hits album by Whigfield
- Released: 2007
- Genre: Eurodance
- Label: Off Limits

Whigfield chronology
4 (2002)	All In One (2007)	W (2012)

All In One is a 2007 album released by Whigfield, her first music project in 3 years. This album serves as a Greatest hits album, although all the tracks have been re-recorded with new sounds. It also includes two new tracks: Rainbow and Right in the Night, the latter being a cover of Jam & Spoon's song. The track listing has been chosen by the fans. The album has been released as both a digital download and a physical cd copy.

== Track listing ==
1. Think of You - 3:34
2. Another Day - 3:35
3. Right In the Night - 4:20
4. Was a Time - 3:59
5. Close to You - 3:47
6. Saturday Night - 4:00
7. Rainbow - 3:51
8. Gotta Getcha - 4:16
9. No Tears to Cry - 4:02
10. Sexy Eyes - 3:48
11. Givin' All My Love - 3:44
12. Out of Sight - 3:50
