= Big Time (Whigfield song) =

1995 single by Whigfield

Single by Whigfield

from the album Whigfield
- Released: 31 July 1995
- Genre: Eurodance; pop reggae
- Length: 3:21
- Label: X-Energy
- Songwriters: Davide Riva; Alfredo Larry Pignagnoli; Annerley Gordon; Paul Sears
- Producers: Davide Riva; Alfredo Larry Pignagnoli

Whigfield singles chronology
"Close to You" (1995)	"Big Time" (1995)	"Last Christmas" (1995)

Music video
- "Big Time" on YouTube

"Big Time" is a song by Italian Eurodance project Whigfield, which was fronted by Danish-born singer Sannie Charlotte Carlson. It was released in July 1995 by X-Energy Records as the fifth single from her debut album, Whigfield (1995). The song was written by Annerley Gordon, Alfredo Larry Pignagnoli, Davide Riva and Paul Sears, and produced by Pignagnoli and Riva. For the British market, it was released by Systematic as a double A-side single with "Last Christmas", a cover of the English duo Wham!, and reached number 21 on the UK Singles Chart. In other countries, "Big Time" was a top-10 hit in Canada, and a top-20 hit in Denmark, Italy, the Netherlands and Spain.

== Critical reception ==
British The Guardian complimented the song as "cute". Pan-European magazine Music & Media compared it to Swedish band Ace of Base, writing, "When the cat's away—that's Ace of Base—the mice will play. And they're having a big time with a pop reggae song ready for summer chart domination." Music Week commented, "Hedging her bets, Whiggy releases a drippy cut from her debut album, alongside a corny version of the Wham! festive fave." Johnny Cigarettes from NME said it is "a pitiful stab in the dark at Ace of Base". Gill Whyte from Smash Hits gave "Big Time" a score of four out of five, writing, "Phew! This is more like the old Whiggers! An admirably naff singalong chorus of a hi-de-hi-de-hi-de-ho nature, plenty of kitsch pop and cod reggae. A mindless dance ditty, this is what keeps the nation on its feet."

== Chart performance ==
In Europe, "Big Time" became a top-20 hit on the charts in Denmark (12), Italy (11), the Netherlands (20) and Spain (13). Additionally, it was a top-30 hit in Belgian Flanders (29), Ireland (24), Scotland (21) and the UK. In the latter nation, the song was released as a double single with Whigfield's cover of "Last Christmas" by Wham!. It peaked at number 21 also on the UK Singles Chart on 10 December 1995, during its first week at the chart. It spent a total of five weeks within the chart. In Germany, it reached number 50, while on the Eurochart Hot 100, it peaked at number 54 after three weeks on the chart.

Outside Europe, the single was a top-10 hit in Canada, peaking at number eight on The Record singles chart, while reaching the top 30 on the RPM Dance/Urban chart, peaking at number 22. It also became a top-30 hit in Israel, peaking at number 23 on 10 October 1995 and spent four weeks in the top 30.

== Music video ==
In the accompanying music video for "Big Time", Whigfield walks in a deserted countryside with a shopping cart with foods. She wears a red dress. A white cabriolet with three girls are passing by and Whigfield goes with them. Other scenes show Whigfield singing while standing on a wrecking ball. She and the girls also stops at a car repair shop to get the car fixed. Then they drive on. At the end the shopping cart is being emptied from a rock crush. The video was later made available by X-Energy on YouTube in 2013.

== Track listings ==
- CD maxi, Italy (X-Energy Records)
1. "Big Time" (Album Version) – 3:21
2. "Big Time" (Summer Zone Remix) – 5:18
3. "Big Time" (Dancing Divaz Club Mix) – 6:54
4. "Big Time" (M.B.R.G. Remix) – 4:50
5. "Saturday Night" (US Classical Vocal Remix) – 9:15
- CD maxi, Mexico (Musart)
1. "Big Time" (Version Album) – 3:21
2. "Big Time" (Summer Zone Remix) – 5:18)
3. "Big Time" (MBRG Remix) – 4:50
4. "Big Time" (Dancing Divaz Club Mix) – 6:54
5. "Big Time" (Extended Version) – 4:32

- CD maxi, Canada (Quality Records)
1. "Big Time" (Summer Zone Remix) – 5:21
2. "Big Time" (Extended Version) – 4:35
3. "Big Time" (MBRG Remix) – 4:52
4. "Big Time" (Dancing Divaz Mix) – 7:01
5. "Big Time" (Album Version) – 3:21
- EP, Australia
1. "Big Time" (Single Version)
2. "Big Time" (Summer Zone Remix)
3. "Big Time" (Extended Version)
4. "Big Time" (MBRG Mix)
5. "Big Time" (Dancin Divaz Club Mix)

== Charts ==
Chart (1995)	Peak position
Belgium (Ultratop 50 Flanders)	29
Belgium (Ultratop 50 Wallonia)	35
Canada Retail Singles (The Record)	8
Canada Dance/Urban (RPM)	22
Denmark (IFPI)	12
Europe (Eurochart Hot 100)	54
Germany (GfK)	50
Ireland (IRMA)	24
Israel (Israeli Singles Chart)	23
Italy (Musica e dischi)	11
Netherlands (Dutch Top 40)	22
Netherlands (Single Top 100)	20
Quebec (ADISQ)	50
Scotland (OCC)	21
Spain (AFYVE)	13
UK Singles (OCC)	21
UK Club Chart (Music Week)	44

== Release history ==
Region	Date	Format(s)	Label(s)	Ref.
Germany	31 July 1995	CD	Energy; ZYX Music	
United Kingdom	4 December 1995	CD; cassette	Systematic	
