= Givin' All My Love =

- CD Maxi - Europe

Single by Whigfield

from the album Whigfield II
- Released: 19 March 1998
- Recorded: 1997
- Genre: Bubblegum dance
- Length: 3:36
- Label: Orange Records; Danza
- Songwriter(s): Annerley Gordon; Daniela Galli; Davide Riva; Paul Sears
- Producer(s): Alfredo Larry Pignagnoli; Davide Riva

Whigfield singles chronology
"No Tears to Cry" (1997)	"Givin' All My Love" (1998)	"Be My Baby" (1999)

Music video
- "Givin' All My Love" on YouTube

Alternative covers
- CD Maxi - Scandinavia

"Givin' All My Love" is a song by Italian Eurodance project Whigfield which was performed by Danish-born Sannie Charlotte Carlson. It is written by Annerley Gordon, Daniela Galli, Davide Riva and Paul Sears. The song was released on 19 March 1998 as the final single from her second album Whigfield II. "Givin' All My Love" was released in Europe and Scandinavia. peaking at number 33 on the (Eurochart Hot 100).

== Track listing ==
CD maxi

Europe

1. Givin' All My Love (original radio edit) 3:36
2. Givin' All My Love (Alesis edit mix) 3:58
3. Givin' All My Love (Alesis extended mix) 5:48
4. Givin' All My Love (Gambadubs easy mix) 6:33

Scandinavia

1. Givin' All My Love (Alesis edit mix) 3:58
2. Givin' All My Love (Alesis extended mix) 5:48
3. Givin' All My Love (original radio edit) 3:36
4. Givin' All My Love (Gambadubs easy mix) 6:33

== Personnel ==
- Executive Producer – Larry Pignagnoli
- Producers – Davide Riva, Larry Pignagnoli
- Written by Annerley Gordon, D. Galli*, Davide Riva, Paul Sears

== Charts ==
Chart (1998)	Peak position
Europe (European Hot 100 Singles)	33
