= Gimme Gimme (Whigfield song) =

1996 single by Whigfield

- CD Maxi - Europe

Single by Whigfield

from the album Whigfield II
- Released: 4 November 1996
- Length: 4:02
- Label: BMG; Danza
- Songwriters: Annerley Gordon; Davide Riva; Paul Sears
- Producers: Alfredo Larry Pignagnoli; Davide Riva

Whigfield singles chronology
""Sexy Eyes" (1996)	"Gimme Gimme" (1996)	"No Tears to Cry" (1997)

Music video
- "Gimme Gimme" on YouTube

"Gimme Gimme" is a song by Italian Eurodance project Whigfield, which was fronted by Danish-born Sannie Charlotte Carlson. It was released on the 4 November 1996, by labels BMG and Danza, as the first single from the project's second album, Whigfield II (1997). The song is written by Annerley Gordon, Davide Riva and Paul Sears, and produced by Riva and Larry Pignagnoli. It went to number 14 in Australia and also peaked at number 37 on the Eurochart Hot 100. "Gimme Gimme" sold to gold in Australia after 35,000 singles were shipped there.

== Track listing ==
1. "Gimme Gimme" (American radio / video version) 3:47
2. "Gimme Gimme" (Original radio / video vox) 4:02
3. "Gimme Gimme" (American mix) 5:17
4. "Gimme Gimme" (MBRG radio mix) 3:24
5. " Gimme Gimme" (extended vox) 6:16
6. "Gimme Gimme" (MBRG extended mix) 5:35

== Personnel ==
- Written by Annerley Gordon, Davide Riva and Paul Sears
- Produced by Larry Pignagnoli
- Produced, arranged, and mixed by Davide Riva
- Mastered by Peter Brussee

== Charts ==
Chart (1996–1997)	Peak position
Australia (ARIA)	14
Belgium (Ultratip Bubbling Under Flanders)	7
Estonia Airplay (Eesti Top 15)	15
Europe Border Breakers (Music & Media)	9
Netherlands (Dutch Top 40 Tipparade)	15
Netherlands (Single Top 100)	84

== Certifications ==
Region	Certification	Certified units/sales
Australia (ARIA)	Gold	35,000^{^}
^{^} Shipments figures based on certification alone.
