= Last Christmas =

1984 single by Wham!

- UK vinyl sleeve for the original 1984 and international release

Single by Wham!

from the album Music from the Edge of Heaven
- A-side: "Everything She Wants" (various)
- B-side: "Credit Card Baby" (Japan); "Blue (Live in China)" (1985); "Where Did Your Heart Go?" (1986)
- Written: February 1984
- Released: 3 December 1984
- Recorded: August 1984
- Studio: Advision, London
- Genre: Synth-pop; Christmas
- Length: 6:44 (album version and pudding mix); 4:24 (instrumental version); 5:51 (live version)
- Label: Columbia; Epic; CBS
- Songwriter: George Michael
- Producer: George Michael

Wham! singles chronology
"Freedom" (1984)	"Last Christmas" (1984)	"Everything She Wants" (1984)

Music videos
- "Last Christmas" on YouTube
- "Last Christmas" (Pudding mix) on YouTube

"Last Christmas" is a song by the English duo Wham!. It was released on 3 December 1984 via CBS Records internationally and as a double A-side via Epic Records with "Everything She Wants" in multiple European countries. "Last Christmas" was written and produced by the Wham! member George Michael. He wrote it in February 1984 about a Christmas breakup and recorded it that August.

"Last Christmas" spent five consecutive weeks at number two on the UK singles chart. It was beaten to Christmas number one by the charity single "Do They Know It's Christmas?" by Band Aid, on which Michael also performed. Funds from the sale of "Do They Know It's Christmas" were donated to the 1983–1985 famine in Ethiopia.

Until 2021, "Last Christmas" was the highest-selling UK single never to reach number one. It has entered the UK singles chart every year since 2007, reached number one for the first time on New Year's Day 2021, and became Christmas number one in 2023. Combining sales and streams, it also became the third-best selling UK single, with 5.34 million sales. In 2024, it became the first song to become Christmas number one for consecutive years. "Last Christmas" has also topped the charts in 14 other European countries. In December 2025, it reached number one on the Billboard Global 200.

In the UK, "Last Christmas" was voted eighth on the 2012 ITV television special The Nation's Favourite Christmas Song and voted the most popular 1980s song in Channel 5's Christmas 2020 countdown Britain's Favourite '80s Songs. It has been covered by artists including Taylor Swift, Ariana Grande, Whigfield, Crazy Frog, Jimmy Eat World, Hilary Duff, and Billie Piper.

== Composition ==
"Last Christmas" describes a Christmastime break-up. The engineer, Chris Porter, said the upbeat rhythm track contrasted against the sadness of unrequited love. The same chord progression and melody is used for both the verse and chorus, with no middle eight.

== Production ==
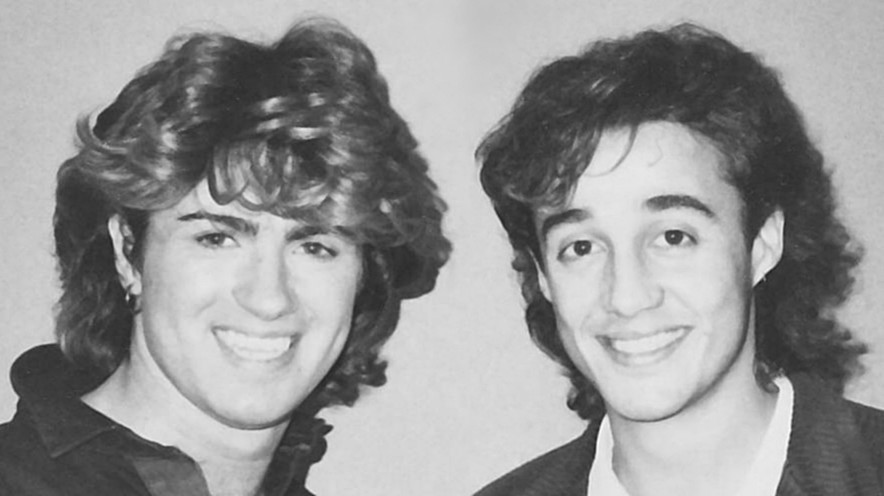
George Michael (left) wrote and performed "Last Christmas" without Andrew Ridgeley (right)

The Wham! member George Michael wrote "Last Christmas" in his childhood bedroom in February 1984, when he and the other member, Andrew Ridgeley, were visiting his parents. Michael played Ridgeley the introduction and chorus melody, which Ridgeley later called "a moment of wonder".

Wham! recorded "Last Christmas" in August 1984, at Advision Studios, London, with Michael having covered the studio in Christmas decorations "to set the mood". Michael produced the song and wrote and performed every part, using a LinnDrum drum machine, a Roland Juno-60 synthesiser and sleigh bells. Though Michael had no musical training, he performed each part himself, playing the keyboards "with two or three fingers", according to Porter. The only other people in the studio were Porter and two assistants, Paul Gomersall and Richard Moakes.

Subsequent releases of "Last Christmas" feature a different mix with re-recorded parts, including Michael's vocals. As of 2025, it has been used for all releases since and the original mix has never been reissued.

== Chart performance ==
On its first release, "Last Christmas" reached number two on the UK singles chart, beaten by the charity single "Do They Know It's Christmas?" by Band Aid, on which Michael also performed. Wham! donated their "Last Christmas" royalties to the Ethiopian famine relief fund, the same cause as Band Aid. It was the most-played Christmas song of the 21st century in the UK until 2011, when it was overtaken by "Fairytale of New York" (1987) by the Pogues and Kirsty MacColl.

In December 2019, "Last Christmas" reached number one on the Official Vinyl Singles Chart and the Official Video Streaming Chart. The following week, it was streamed 17.1 million times, a UK record for the most streams in a week. It was the year's best-selling vinyl single in the UK. By February 2020, "Last Christmas" had sold more than 1.90 million copies, becoming the 10th-bestselling UK single in history and the bestselling single not to reach number one. "Last Christmas" reached number one on 1 January 2021, achieving the record for the longest time for a single to reach UK number one, previously held in 2005 by Tony Christie with "(Is This The Way To) Amarillo?". The record was surpassed in 2022 by Kate Bush with "Running Up That Hill", which took 37 years. In December 2022, "Last Christmas" reached number two on the UK singles chart, behind LadBaby's "Food Aid", a parody of "Do They Know It's Christmas?".

In December 2023, "Last Christmas" became the UK Christmas number one. It also became the third-best selling UK single, with 5.34 million sales, including streams. As of December 2023, it had sold more than 1.93 million physical copies and downloads, making it the eighth-bestselling single ever in the UK. It was certified nine-times platinum in January 2026. In 2024, it became the first song to be Christmas number one for two consecutive years. That year, PRS for Music estimated that "Last Christmas" generates £300,000 of royalties per year. In December 2025, "Last Christmas" reached number two on the UK singles chart, beaten by Kylie Minogue's "XMAS".

"Last Christmas" was voted eighth on the 2012 ITV television special The Nation's Favourite Christmas Song and voted the most popular 1980s song in Channel 5's Christmas 2020 countdown Britain's Favourite '80s Songs.

UK singles chart
Year	Peak No.	Chart run
1984	2	13 weeks (15 December 1984 – 9 March 1985)
1985	6	7 weeks (14 December 1985 – 25 January 1986)
1986	45	5 weeks (13 December 1986 – 10 January 1987)
2007	14	5 weeks (8 December 2007 – 5 January 2008)
2008	26	5 weeks (6 December 2008 – 3 January 2009)
2009	34	4 weeks (12 December 2009 – 2 January 2010)
2010	53	4 weeks (11 December 2010 – 1 January 2011)
2011	26	4 weeks (10 December 2011 – 31 December 2011)
2012	34	5 weeks (8 December 2012 – 5 January 2013)
2013	36	5 weeks (7 December 2013 – 4 January 2014)
2014	28	5 weeks (6 December 2014 – 3 January 2015)
2015	18	5 weeks (10 December 2015 – 7 January 2016)
2016	7	5 weeks (8 December 2016 – 5 January 2017)
2017	2	6 weeks (30 November 2017 – 4 January 2018)
2018	3	5 weeks (6 December 2018 – 3 January 2019)
2019	3	6 weeks (28 November 2019 – 2 January 2020)
2020	1	8 weeks (19 November 2020 – 7 January 2021)
2021	2	8 weeks (18 November 2021 – 6 January 2022)
2022	1	8 weeks (17 November 2022 – 5 January 2023)
2023	1	9 weeks (16 November 2023 – 11 January 2024)
2024	1	9 weeks (14 November 2024 – 9 January 2025)
2025	1	8 weeks (13 November 2025 – 31 December 2025)
2026	12	3 weeks (12 November 2026 – 26 November 2026)

=== Other territories ===
In Germany, "Last Christmas" is the most successful Christmas single of all time, having spent 169 weeks on the German Singles Chart. It reached number one on 24 December 2021. It has charted every year since 1997. In January 2008, the song fell from No. 4 to No. 64, also making it the biggest fall out of the top 10 on the singles chart. In Ireland the single went to number one on 30 December 2022 and returned to the top of the Irish charts on 27 December 2024.

In Japan, the single was originally released in two different formats with different cover art, a 7-inch and 12-inch vinyl (Long version) both with "Credit Card Baby" as their B-side. The former entered the top 20 of the Oricon Singles Chart peaking at No. 15, while the latter reached No. 47. In 1993, it reached No. 17 within Japan, and by that point had sold 120,500 copies there. It was reissued in November 2001 and 2004 as a two-track CD with the single edit and the "pudding mix". "Last Christmas" is the eighth-best-selling single in Japan released by a foreign act, with total physical sales of 683,000 copies.

In the Netherlands, "Last Christmas" reached No. 2 in January 1985 (behind Band Aid's "Do They Know It's Christmas?"). In the Dutch Singles Top 100 (one of three charts in the Netherlands that claims to be the "official" chart, but it is the only one that is not broadcast and remains unpublished except on its own official web page), the song has now entered on 16 different occasions, including every year since 2006. Its highest position after 1984 was No. 4 (during the 2016 and 2018 Christmas season). In the Dutch Mega Top 50 (which was first published in 1993), the song reappeared in 1997, 2000, 2007, 2008, and 2013.

"Last Christmas" was not released as a commercial single in the United States until November 2014, when it was made available on 12" vinyl as a Record Store Day exclusive. It has re-entered the Billboard Holiday 100 chart on a regular basis, peaking at No. 2 on 13 December 2025. In November 2016, total US sales of the digital track stood at 751,000 downloads according to Nielsen SoundScan, placing it 10th on the list of best-selling Christmas/holiday digital singles in US SoundScan history. The song debuted at No. 50 on the Billboard Hot 100 in the chart dated 7 January 2017, after George Michael died. In December 2018, the song re-entered the Hot 100, reaching No. 25 in January 2019, and then a new peak of No. 11 in the first issue of 2020. On the issue dated 2 January 2021, "Last Christmas" reached No. 9 on the Hot 100, its first foray into the top 10 and returning Wham! to the top 10 after a 35-year break. The following year, on the issue dated 1 January 2022, the song reached No. 7. On the issue dated 24 December 2022, the song reached No. 6 on the Hot 100. On the year's last issue of the Billboard Hot 100, dated 31 December 2022, "Last Christmas" reached the top five.

In 2024, "Last Christmas" became the first Christmas single to chart during the year-end holiday season, debuting at No. 38 on the Billboard Hot 100 for the week ending 23 November. On Billboard's 50th issue of 2024, dated 14 December, the song reached No. 3 on the Hot 100. On the chart dated 13 December 2025, "Last Christmas" reached a new peak position of No. 2. On 9 December 2025, the digital single was certified nine-times platinum, indicating US sales of 9 million digital copies. In 2017, 2018, 2019 and 2021, "Last Christmas" reached No. 1 on the Swedish singles chart. In December 2025, "Last Christmas" reached No. 1 on the Billboard Global 200, a ranking of sales and streams from over 200 territories.

== Music video ==
The music video for "Last Christmas" features Michael and Ridgeley accompanying girlfriends at a ski resort, contrasting scenes of a happy Christmas holiday with "wistful memories about past romance". According to Wham!'s manager at the time, Simon Napier-Bell, Michael planned "Last Christmas" as part of a "Christmas package" including the video and a performance at Wembley Stadium. Michael instructed the director, Andy Morahan, to create a Christmas version of the video for Wham!'s single "Club Tropicana". It was filmed in a ski resort in Saas-Fee, Switzerland, with friends and family members, including the Wham! backing singers Pepsi & Shirlie. Michael's ex-girlfriend was played by the model Kathy Hill. The music video features the wooden Chalet Schliechte, which is located on the edge of the village. The interior of the building was already filmed in the nearby Chalet Tita. The clip also shows the operational Felskinn cable car. The band stayed at the Walliserhof hotel during the shooting of the music video.

The music video, originally shot on 35mm film, was re-released on 13 December 2019 in 4K Ultra HD resolution. Morahan had found seven out of the eight rolls of original 35mm rushes and worked with teams at Cinelab London and VFX artist Russ Shaw at Nice Biscuits post production to recreate the video using the higher-resolution film.

== Plagiarism allegation ==
On behalf of the writers of the 1975 song "Can't Smile Without You", made popular by Barry Manilow, the publishing company Dick James Music sued Michael for plagiarism in the mid-1980s, claiming that "Last Christmas" had taken its melody. The case was dismissed when a musicologist presented numerous songs from the past century that had a comparable chord sequence and melody.

== Other media ==
A sixty-minute TV documentary about the story of "Last Christmas" titled Last Christmas Unwrapped aired on BBC Two and BBC iPlayer in December 2024 to mark the 40th anniversary of its release. It features Ridgeley, Shirlie, Pepsi and other close friends from the original music video, and revisits Saas-Fee in Switzerland where the music video was made while revealing a monument to the song, as well as looking into the creation of the song. The film Last Christmas (2019) prominently features the music of George Michael, including this song.

== Personnel ==
- George Michael – vocals, bass guitar, Roland Juno-60 synthesiser, LinnDrum programming, sleigh bells

== Charts ==
=== Weekly charts ===
Weekly chart performance for "Last Christmas"
Chart (1984–2026)	Peak position
Australia (ARIA)	2
Austria (Ö3 Austria Top 40)	1
Belarus Airplay (TopHit)	113
Belgium (Ultratop 50 Flanders)	2
Belgium (Ultratop 50 Wallonia)	2
Bolivia (Billboard)	17
Brazil Hot 100 (Billboard)	85
Canada Hot 100 (Billboard)	2
Chile (Billboard)	12
CIS Airplay (TopHit)	28
Croatia (Billboard)	1
Croatia International Airplay (Top lista)	1
Czech Republic Airplay (ČNS IFPI)	9
Czech Republic Singles Digital (ČNS IFPI)	1
Denmark (Tracklisten)	1
Ecuador (Billboard)	10
Estonia Airplay (TopHit)	3
Finland (Suomen virallinen lista)	1
France (SNEP)	2
Germany (GfK)	1
Global 200 (Billboard)	1
Greece International (IFPI)	1
Hong Kong (Billboard)	8
Hungary (Rádiós Top 40)	40
Hungary (Single Top 40)	1
Hungary (Stream Top 40)	2
Iceland (Tónlistinn)	1
Ireland (IRMA)	1
Israel International Airplay (Media Forest)	18
Italy (FIMI)	1
Japan Hot 100 (Billboard)	13
Japan (Oricon)	12
Japan Combined Singles (Oricon)	46
Kazakhstan Airplay (TopHit)	31
Latvia Airplay (LaIPA)	3
Latvia Streaming (LaIPA)	1
Lebanon (Lebanese Top 20)	1
Lithuania (AGATA)	1
Luxembourg (Billboard)	1
Malaysia (Billboard)	13
Malaysia International (RIM)	11
Malta Airplay (Radiomonitor)	5
Middle East and North Africa (IFPI)	4
Mexico (Billboard)	25
Moldova Airplay (TopHit)	23
Netherlands (Dutch Top 40)	2
Netherlands (Single Top 100)	1
New Zealand (Recorded Music NZ)	1
Nigeria (TurnTable Top 100)	74
Norway (VG-lista)	2
Peru (Billboard)	9
Philippines Hot 100 (Billboard Philippines)	13
Poland Airplay (ZPAV)	6
Poland Dance (ZPAV)	42
Poland (Polish Streaming Top 100)	1
Portugal (AFP)	2
Romania (Billboard)	4
Russia Airplay (TopHit)	85
Russia Streaming (TopHit)	29
Scottish Singles Sales (Official Charts)	3
Singapore Streaming (RIAS)	2
Slovakia Airplay (ČNS IFPI)	18
Slovakia Singles Digital (ČNS IFPI)	1
Slovenia Airplay (SloTop50)	1
South Africa Airplay (TOSAC)	7
South Africa Streaming (TOSAC)	7
South Korea (Circle)	78
Spain (Promusicae)	6
Sweden (Sverigetopplistan)	1
Switzerland (Schweizer Hitparade)	1
United Arab Emirates Streaming (IFPI)	1
UK Singles (Official Charts)	1
Ukraine Airplay (TopHit)	15
US Billboard Hot 100	2
US Adult Contemporary (Billboard)	22
US Adult Pop Airplay (Billboard)	40
US Holiday 100 (Billboard)	2
US Rolling Stone Top 100	7
Vietnam (Vietnam Hot 100)	50

=== Monthly charts ===
Monthly chart performance for "Last Christmas"
Chart (2023–2025)	Peak position
CIS Airplay (TopHit)	31
Estonia Airplay (TopHit)	17
Lithuania Airplay (TopHit)	4
Moldova Airplay (TopHit)	32
Paraguay Airplay (SGP)	47
Romania Airplay (TopHit)	64
Russia Streaming (TopHit)	35
Ukraine Airplay (TopHit)	65

=== Year-end charts ===
Year-end chart rankings for "Last Christmas"
Chart (1984)	Position
UK Singles (Gallup)	6

Chart (1985)	Position
Australia (Kent Music Report)	31
Belgium (Ultratop Flanders)	65
Netherlands (Dutch Top 40)	65

Chart (2016)	Position
Hungary (Single Top 40)	95

Chart (2017)	Position
Hungary (Single Top 40)	69

Chart (2018)	Position
Hungary (Single Top 40)	66
Netherlands (Airplay Top 40)	97

Chart (2019)	Position
Hungary (Single Top 40)	39
UK Singles (OC)	95

Chart (2020)	Position
Hungary (Single Top 40)	38
Hungary (Stream Top 40)	67
UK Singles (OC)	60

Chart (2021)	Position
Austria (Ö3 Austria Top 40)	71
Canada (Canadian Hot 100)	97
Denmark (Tracklisten)	77
Germany (GfK)	61
Global 200 (Billboard)	143
Hungary (Single Top 40)	61
Hungary (Stream Top 40)	77
Switzerland (Schweizer Hitparade)	92
UK Singles (OC)	34

Chart (2022)	Position
Denmark (Tracklisten)	70
Germany (GfK)	75
Global 200 (Billboard)	138
Hungary (Single Top 40)	57
Hungary (Stream Top 40)	76
Sweden (Sverigetopplistan)	92
Switzerland (Schweizer Hitparade)	71
UK Singles (OC)	35
US Streaming Songs (Billboard)	73

Chart (2023)	Position
Austria (Ö3 Austria Top 40)	72
Canada (Canadian Hot 100)	78
Denmark (Tracklisten)	58
Germany (GfK)	51
Global 200 (Billboard)	129
Hungary (Single Top 40)	38
Netherlands (Single Top 100)	98
Sweden (Sverigetopplistan)	76
Switzerland (Schweizer Hitparade)	71
UK Singles (OC)	18
US Billboard Hot 100	84

Chart (2024)	Position
Austria (Ö3 Austria Top 40)	30
Canada (Canadian Hot 100)	76
Denmark (Tracklisten)	74
Germany (GfK)	49
Global 200 (Billboard)	123
Netherlands (Single Top 100)	100
Switzerland (Schweizer Hitparade)	62
UK Singles (OC)	30
US Billboard Hot 100	74

Chart (2025)	Position
Austria (Ö3 Austria Top 40)	47
Canada (Canadian Hot 100)	77
Germany (GfK)	32
Global 200 (Billboard)	103
Switzerland (Schweizer Hitparade)	53
UK Singles (OC)	51
US Billboard Hot 100	65

=== Decade-end charts ===
20s Decade-end chart performance
Chart (2025–2026)	Position
Russia Streaming (TopHit)	82

=== All-time charts ===
Chart	Position
US Holiday 100 (Billboard)	8

== Certifications ==
Region	Certification	Certified units/sales
Australia (ARIA)	8× Platinum	560,000^{‡}
Canada (Music Canada)	9× Platinum	720,000^{‡}
Denmark (IFPI Danmark)	7× Platinum	630,000^{‡}
Germany (BVMI)	7× Gold	2,100,000^{‡}
Greece (IFPI Greece)	Gold	10,000^{^}
Italy (FIMI) sales since 2009	3× Platinum	300,000^{‡}
Japan (RIAJ) physical sales	2× Platinum	655,000
Japan (RIAJ) Chaku-Uta Full (R) digital 2004–2011	Platinum	250,000^{*}
Japan (RIAJ) Chaku-Uta (R) digital 2002–2019	3× Platinum	750,000^{*}
Netherlands (NVPI)	Platinum	100,000^{^}
New Zealand (RMNZ)	4× Platinum	120,000^{‡}
Portugal (AFP)	3× Platinum	75,000^{‡}
Spain (Promusicae)	2× Platinum	120,000^{‡}
United Kingdom (BPI)	9× Platinum	5,400,000^{‡}
United States (RIAA)	9× Platinum	9,000,000^{‡}
Streaming
Greece (IFPI Greece)	2× Platinum	4,000,000^{†}
Japan (RIAJ)	Gold	50,000,000^{†}
Sweden (GLF)	10× Platinum	80,000,000^{†}
^{*} Sales figures based on certification alone.^{^} Shipments figures based on certification alone.^{‡} Sales+streaming figures based on certification alone.^{†} Streaming-only figures based on certification alone.

== Release history ==
Region	Date	Format(s)	Version(s)	Label(s)	Ref.
UK	3 December 1984	7-inch vinyl	Original	Epic	
UK	3 December 1984	12-inch vinyl	Pudding mix	Epic	
Various	10 December 1984	12-inch vinyl	Pudding mix	Epic, CBS	
Japan	15 December 1984	7-inch vinyl	Original	Epic	
Japan	21 December 1984	12-inch vinyl	Original "long version"	Epic	
Europe	December 1985	7-inch vinyl	1985 version	Epic	
Europe	December 1985	12-inch vinyl	Pudding mix	Epic	
UK	December 1986	7-inch vinyl	85 version	Epic	
Japan	9 December 1988	CD single (8cm)	85 version; Pudding mix	Epic	
Europe	December 1988	CD single (8cm); vinyl	85 version; Pudding mix	Epic	
Japan	21 November 2001	CD single	85 version; Pudding mix	Epic	
Japan	17 November 2004	CD single	85 version; Pudding mix	Epic	
UK	22 November 2004	Download	85 version; Pudding mix	Sony	
United States	28 November 2014	12-inch vinyl	85 version; Instrumental	Columbia	
Various	13 December 2019	7-inch vinyl	85 version	RCA	
UK	15 December 2023	CD single	85 version; Pudding mix	Sony Music	
UK	15 December 2023	7-inch vinyl	85 version	Sony Music	
UK	13 December 2024	CD single; (40th Anniversary EP)	85 version; Pudding mix; 2006 live; Instrumental	Sony Music	
UK	13 December 2024	12-inch vinyl 40th Anniversary EP	85 version; Pudding mix; 2006 live; Instrumental	Sony Music	

== Cover versions ==
=== Whigfield version ===
"Last Christmas"

Single by Whigfield

from the album Whigfield and Whigfield II
- Released: 4 December 1995
- Genre: Hi-NRG; Christmas
- Length: 4:16
- Label: X-Energy
- Songwriter: George Michael
- Producer: Larry Pignagnoli

Whigfield singles chronology
"Big Time" (1995)	"Last Christmas" (1995)	"Sexy Eyes" (1996)

Music video
- "Last Christmas" on YouTube

The Italian singer Whigfield covered "Last Christmas" and released it as a double A-side with "Big Time" in the UK in December 1995. The single was also released as a double A-side single in Germany with "Close to You". In other countries, "Last Christmas" was released on its own with various remixes. The single was produced by Larry Pignagnoli and reached number 21 in the UK, which was Whigfield's final release on Systematic Records. It also appears on various special edition versions of her debut album, Whigfield (1995), and also on Whigfield II (1997). The music video was directed by Giacomo De Simone and features Whigfield performing in a winter landscape. It was filmed in Massa Carrara, Italy.

==== Chart performance ====
Whigfield's cover of "Last Christmas" climbed into the top 10 in both Denmark and Spain, peaking at numbers six and five, respectively. It was also a top-20 hit in Finland and a top-30 hit in Ireland and the United Kingdom. In the latter country, "Last Christmas" / "Big Time" reached number 21 during its first week on the UK singles chart, on 10 December 1995. It was additionally a top-40 hit in Belgium, as well as on the European Hot 100 Singles, on which the song reached number 38.

==== Critical reception ====
John Perry from NME named "Last Christmas" by Whigfield Single of the Week, writing, "Gird your loins and don that silly party hat, pop-pickers, because what we have here is the classic Christmas single. [...] The Whigster has taken what was a definitive Christmas song and given it a monster 'I Feel Love' hi-NRG fuel-injection that will have the nation stomping those accursed parsnips into Auntie Mabel's best rug in front of The Queen..." Gill Whyte from Smash Hits gave it two out of five, describing it as "a cover of the George Michael swoon choon for the festive season, given the usual tinny pop Whiggers treatment, with lots of bingy-bongy synths. A classic song, so you can't go wrong, um, only she has, 'cos it just ain't as good as the original."

==== Track listings ====
12-inch single, Italy (1995)	CD single, UK (1995)
1. "Last Christmas" (MBRG Version) – 5:25	1. "Last Christmas (Major Cut) – 4:10
2. "Last Christmas" (Major Version) – 4:10	2. "Big Time (Dancing Divas Club Mix) – 6:54
3. "Big Time" (Album Version) – 3:21	3. "Saturday Night (Spike Vocal) – 7:28
4. "Last Christmas" (David Version) – 8:00	4. "Saturday Night (Afternoon Mix) (Fishbone Beat's Remix)
5. "Last Christmas" (Minor Version) – 4:10
CD single, Italy (1995)	CD maxi, Scandinavia (1995)
1. "Last Christmas" (Major Version)	1. "Last Christmas" (MBRG Version) – 5:25
2. "Last Christmas" (MBRG Version)	2. "Last Christmas" (Major Version) – 4:10
3. "Last Christmas" (David Version)	3. "Last Christmas" (Minor Version) – 4:20
4. "Last Christmas" (Minor Version)	4. "Last Christmas" (Major Mild Eq. Version) – 4:10
5. "Close to You" (Down Town Remix)	5. "Last Christmas" (K. David Version) – 8:00

==== Charts ====
Chart (1995)	Peak position
Belgium (Ultratop 50 Wallonia)	38
Denmark (IFPI)	6
Europe (European Hot 100 Singles)	38
Europe Eurochart Hot 100	61
Finland (Suomen virallinen lista)	12
Ireland (IRMA)	24
Netherlands (Dutch Top 40 Tipparade)	2
Netherlands (Single Top 100)	34
Scotland (OC)	21
Spain (AFYVE)	4
Sweden (Sverigetopplistan)	53
UK Singles (OC)	21

=== Ashley Tisdale version ===
"Last Christmas"

Promotional single by Ashley Tisdale
- Released: 11 November 2006
- Recorded: 2006
- Genre: Christmas; pop
- Length: 3:55; 3:39 (radio edit)
- Label: Warner Bros.
- Songwriter: George Michael
- Producer: Mark Hammond

Official audio
- "Last Christmas" on YouTube

"Last Christmas" was recorded in 2006 for Warner Bros. Records by Ashley Tisdale. The song was released to US radios on 11 November 2006 and as a download on 21 November 2006. This song was the first single released by Ashley Tisdale in her deal with Warner Bros. Records and became her official first holiday single. Tisdale performed the single in 2007 on Macy's Thanksgiving Day Parade and Christmas in Rockefeller Center, and in 2009 in the Citadel Outlets of Los Angeles, California. The song was one of the B-sides on the European CD singles of Tisdale's first single "Be Good to Me" and Tisdale's second single "He Said She Said", from the album Headstrong. The song has been included on several compilation albums, including Disney Channel Holiday and A Very Special Christmas 7.

==== Charts ====
Chart (2011)	Peak position
US Holiday Digital Song Sales (Billboard)	47

=== Crazy Frog version ===
"Last Christmas"

Single by Crazy Frog

from the album Crazy Frog Presents More Crazy Hits Ultimate Edition
- Released: 3 December 2006
- Recorded: 2006
- Genre: Dance; electronica; Christmas
- Length: 4:27
- Label: Ministry of Sound
- Songwriter: George Michael

Crazy Frog singles chronology
"We Are the Champions (Ding a Dang Dong)" (2006)	"Last Christmas" (2006)	"Crazy Frog in the House" (2007)

Music video
- "Last Christmas" on YouTube "Last Christmas" (Director's Cut) on YouTube

"Last Christmas" was covered by Crazy Frog and released as a Christmas single in December 2006.

==== Charts ====
Chart performance for "Last Christmas"
Chart (2006)	Peak position
Australia (ARIA)	30
Belgium (Ultratop 50 Flanders)	19
Belgium (Ultratop 50 Wallonia)	6
France (SNEP)	19
Ireland (IRMA)	16
Netherlands (Single Top 100)	48
New Zealand (Recorded Music NZ)	19
UK Singles (Official Charts)	16

=== Cascada version ===
"Last Christmas"

Single by Cascada

from the album It's Christmas Time
- Released: 21 November 2007
- Recorded: 2007
- Genre: Eurodance; Christmas
- Length: 3:27
- Label: Zooland; Robbins; All Around the World
- Songwriter: George Michael

Cascada singles chronology
"Ready for Love" (2006)	"Last Christmas" (2007)	"What Hurts the Most" (2007)

Music video
- "Last Christmas" on YouTube

"Last Christmas" was recorded in 2007 by Cascada. It was released on iTunes in November 2007. The single had only a digital release but six days later, it was released on the single "What Hurts the Most" which was the first single from their second album. It was also released as part of their Christmas album, It's Christmas Time.

==== Charts ====
Chart (2007)	Peak position
Germany (GfK)	83
Austria (Ö3 Austria Top 40)	63
UK Singles (Official Charts)	111 (Note: Based on downloads alone, but did chart at number 10, as it was the B-side to "What Hurts the Most".)
UK Dance (Official Charts)	22

Chart (2010)	Peak position
US Dance/Electronic Digital Songs Sales (Billboard)	43

=== Glee cast version ===
"Last Christmas"

Single by Glee cast

from the album Glee: The Music, The Christmas Album
- Released: 23 November 2009
- Recorded: 2009
- Genre: Pop; Christmas
- Length: 3:37
- Label: Columbia
- Songwriter: George Michael

Official audio
- "Last Christmas" on YouTube

The song was covered by the cast of Glee, led by Lea Michele, Cory Monteith with Amber Riley, and was released in 2009 exclusively on iTunes as a charity single, then in 2010 on Glee: The Music, The Christmas Album. The song entered the Billboard Hot 100, becoming the first time a cover version of the song appeared on that chart.

==== Charts ====
Chart (2009–2025)	Peak position
Australia (ARIA)	60
Canada Hot 100 (Billboard)	46
Latvia Airplay (TopHit)	17
Lithuania Airplay (TopHit)	4
US Billboard Hot 100	63
US Adult Contemporary (Billboard)	27
US Holiday Airplay (Billboard)	39
US Holiday Digital Songs (Billboard)	3

=== Joe McElderry version ===
"Last Christmas"

Single by Joe McElderry

from the album Classic Christmas
- Released: 4 November 2011
- Recorded: October 2010
- Genre: Pop; Christmas
- Label: Decca
- Songwriter: George Michael

Joe McElderry singles chronology
"There's a Place for Us" (2010)	"Last Christmas" (2011)	"Here's What I Believe" (2012)

Audio
- "Last Christmas" on YouTube

British singer Joe McElderry covered the song in 2011. This version was released as a single on 19 December 2011, an EP was also released digitally in Ireland on 4 November 2011, and in the UK on 7 November 2011. McElderry's version is taken from his third studio album, Classic Christmas, released 28 November 2011. 7th Heaven Remix & Production have done a remix for the song.

A short music video was made using footage which was filmed for the Classic Christmas's album advertising, it features McElderry outside in the snow, collecting logs and taking them to a large house preparing for a Christmas party, a similar video was made for McElderry's version of "O Come All Ye Faithful". The advert and both videos were directed by Steve Lucker.

=== Ariana Grande version ===
"Last Christmas"

Single by Ariana Grande

from the EP Christmas Kisses
- Released: 19 November 2013
- Recorded: 2013
- Genre: Christmas; dance-pop; R&B
- Length: 3:24
- Label: Republic
- Songwriter: George Michael
- Producers: Kenneth "Babyface" Edmonds; Antonio Dixon; The Rascals

Ariana Grande singles chronology
"Right There" (2013)	"Last Christmas" (2013)	"Love Is Everything" (2013)

Audio video
- "Last Christmas" on YouTube

The American singer Ariana Grande covered "Last Christmas" on her 2013 EP Christmas Kisses. It was released as a single on 19 November 2013 in the iTunes Store. Grande's cover draws primarily from pop music, contemporary R&B and soul and also alters some lyrics. The verses have been described as having a more poppy and R&B vibe than the original.

==== Charts ====
Chart (2013–2026)	Peak position
Australia (ARIA)	95
Global 200 (Billboard)	129
Japan Hot 100 (Billboard)	73
Lithuania (AGATA)	93
Netherlands (Single Top 100)	59
Portugal (AFP)	90
South Korea (Circle)	23
Switzerland (Schweizer Hitparade)	84
UK Singles (Official Charts)	92
US Billboard Hot 100	96
US Adult Contemporary (Billboard)	26
US Holiday 100 (Billboard)	32
US Holiday Digital Song Sales (Billboard)	1
US Holiday Streaming Songs (Billboard)	22

==== Certifications ====
Region	Certification	Certified units/sales
Australia (ARIA)	Gold	35,000^{‡}
New Zealand (RMNZ)	Gold	15,000^{‡}
Portugal (AFP)	Gold	12,000^{‡}
United Kingdom (BPI)	Silver	200,000^{‡}
^{‡} Sales+streaming figures based on certification alone.

=== Carly Rae Jepsen version ===
"Last Christmas"

Single by Carly Rae Jepsen
- Released: 20 November 2015
- Genre: Christmas; synth-pop
- Length: 3:32
- Label: 604; Interscope; School Boy
- Songwriter: George Michael
- Producer: Ben Romans

Carly Rae Jepsen singles chronology
"Your Type" (2015)	"Last Christmas" (2015)	"Boy Problems" (2016)

Audio
- "Last Christmas" on YouTube

"Last Christmas" was covered by Canadian singer Carly Rae Jepsen in 2015 and was released to digital retailers on 20 November 2015 through 604 Records (in Canada) and Interscope Records and School Boy Records (internationally). Jepsen's rendition was praised by critics for combining stylistic elements similar to the original. She performed the song live at the annual NBC television special Christmas in Rockefeller Center airing on 2 December 2015, and on the episode of The Late Late Show with James Corden airing on 16 December 2015.

Bianca Gracie of Idolator described the song as "quintessential Carly" for highlighting Jepsen's unique vocals and synth production and wrote that her cover will "charm your... socks off". Nolan Feeney of Time echoed those sentiments, noting that "Last Christmas" is "the kind of brokenhearted yet warm and sweet song [Jepsen] excels at". Jackson McHenry of Vulture applauded Jepsen for her straightforward approach to the song and avoiding the "vocal gymnastics" that bog down some Christmas covers.

==== Charts ====
Chart (2015–2020)	Peak position
Belgium (Ultratip Bubbling Under Flanders)	21
Belgium (Ultratip Bubbling Under Wallonia)	40
Hungary (Rádiós Top 40)	20
Mexico (Billboard Ingles Airplay)	38
Netherlands (Single Top 100)	100
Sweden (Sverigetopplistan)	80

=== Others ===
- Billie Piper covered "Last Christmas" as a B-side of her 1998 single "She Wants You". It was released as a CD single in limited areas of Europe, charting at number 47 in Sweden.
- Hilary Duff covered "Last Christmas" for her 2002 album Santa Claus Lane, and recorded a second cover for her 2026 EP Holiday Things. In 2012, Duff's first version reached number 68 on the South Korean Gaon Chart. Her second version entered at number 23 on the US Billboard Adult Contemporary chart during November 2026.
- Taylor Swift covered "Last Christmas" for her 2007 EP, The Taylor Swift Holiday Collection. It reached number 28 on the US Billboard Hot Country Songs chart in January 2008 and at number 46 on the Hot Digital Songs chart in December 2008. On Billboard's Greatest of All Time Holiday 100 chart, which measured chart data 1958–2016, Swift's "Last Christmas" charted at number 56.
- Ally Brooke recorded a cover of the song, released on 16 November 2018, and performed it at the Macy's Thanksgiving Day Parade.
- James TW's version in 2018 reached number 22 on the New Zealand Hot Singles Chart, and at number 38 on Sverigetopplistan, the official Swedish singles chart.
- Tinashe recorded an R&B-rendition of the song, included on her 2020 Christmas EP Comfort & Joy.
- Backstreet Boys released a cover of the song on 6 September 2022, as a part of their first Christmas album, A Very Backstreet Christmas. It was accompanied by a music video on 1 November the same year and reached number 1 on the Billboard Holiday AC chart.
- Lauren Spencer Smith released a cover of the song on 10 November 2022. Her version reached number 81 on the Billboard Hot 100 in December 2022.
- One, who represented Greece in the Eurovision Song Contest 2002, adapted the song in Greek as "Οι καμπάνες χτυπούν" (Bells are ringing) in their 2003 album Όνειρα (Dreams).
- The cast of The Only Way Is Essex covered the song in 2011. It reached number 33 in the UK Singles Chart Christmas chart, a place higher than the original.
- Alanis Morissette released a cover of the song on the EP of the same name in November 2023.
- The Philly Specials covered the song for their charity album A Philly Special Christmas Party, released on 22 November 2024.
- Sabrina Carpenter performed a cover of the song with Chappell Roan for the Netflix special A Nonsense Christmas with Sabrina Carpenter, released in December 2024.
- Jem and the Holograms released a cover of the song, sung by Britta Phillips, on 5 December 2025.

== See also ==
- List of best-selling singles
- List of songs which have spent the most weeks on the UK singles chart
- Whamageddon – Christmas season game
