= W (Whigfield album) =

Studio album by Whigfield
- Released: 28 September 2012
- Recorded: Studio 104 (Milan, Italy)
- Genre: Eurodance, dance, electropop
- Label: Off Limits
- Producer: Larry Pignagnoli

Whigfield chronology
All in One (2007)	W (2012)

Singles from W
- 1. "C'est Cool" Released: 3 June 2011; 2. "4Ever" Released: 7 September 2012; 3. "Jeg Kommer Hjem" Released: 30 November 2012

W is the fifth studio album by Italian Eurodance project Whigfield which was performed by Danish-born Sannie Charlotte Carlson, released on 28 September 2012 by Italian label Off Limits. It is her first studio album in 10 years since her previous studio album 4 back in 2002.

== Track listing ==
No.	Title	Lyrics	Composer(s)	Length
1.	"Stay in My Head"	Sannie Carlson	Carlson, Luigi Barone, Davide del Tufo	3:35
2.	"4Ever"	Carlson	Carlson, Barone, Roberto Battini, Igor Favretto	3:57
3.	"Jeg Kommer Hjem"	Carlson	Carlson, Barone, Battini, Favretto	3:15
4.	"As I Go"	Carlson	Carlson, Barone, Marco Savaresi	3:20
5.	"Devil Called Love"	Carlson	Carlson, Barone, Marco Soncini	3:41
6.	"Just Because You're Beautiful"	Carlson	Carlson, Gianluca Allegri, Barone, Favretto, Soncini	3:36
7.	"Behind the Sun"	Carlson, Battini	Barone, Battini, Alfredo Larry Pignagnoli	3:52
8.	"C'est Cool" (right version)	Carlson	Carlson, Allegri, Savaresi	3:00

== Credits and personnel ==
- Larry Pignagnoli – producer, vocal producer
- Luigi Barone – arrangement, performer, mixer, mastering
- Sannie Carlson – vocal arrangement

Credits adapted from album liner notes.
