= No Tears to Cry =

"No Tears To Cry"
- CD Maxi - Europe

Single by Whigfield

from the album Whigfield II
- Released: October 17, 1997
- Recorded: 1997
- Genre: Pop; dance
- Length: 3:51
- Label: Orange Records; Danza
- Songwriter(s): Annerley Gordon; Davide Riva; Paul Sears
- Producer(s): Alfredo Larry Pignagnoli; Davide Riva

Whigfield singles chronology
"Gimme Gimme" (1996)	"No Tears To Cry" (1997)	"Givin All My Love" (1998)

Music video
- "No Tears to Cry" on YouTube

Alternate cover

"No Tears to Cry" is a song by Italian Eurodance project Whigfield and performed on stage by the Danish model Sannie Charlotte Carlson. It is written by Annerley Gordon, Davide Riva and Paul Sears, and was the second single release from her album, Whigfield II, in Europe and Scandinavia.

== Track listing ==
CD maxi

Europe

1. No Tears To Cry (Original Radio Version) 3:51
2. No Tears To Cry (Original Extended Version) 5:26
3. No Tears To Cry (MBRG Edited Version) 3:30
4. No Tears To Cry (MBRG Extended) 6:12
5. No Tears To Cry (Organ Mix) 3:46

Scandinavia

1. No Tears To Cry (Original Extended Version) 5:26
2. No Tears To Cry (Original Radio Version) 3:51
3. No Tears To Cry (MBRG Extended) 6:12
4. No Tears To Cry (MBRG Edited Version) 3:30
5. No Tears To Cry (Organ Mix) 3:46

== Personnel ==
- Executive Producer – Larry Pignagnoli
- Producers – Davide Riva, Larry Pignagnoli
- Written by Annerley Gordon, Davide Riva, Paul Sears

== Charts ==
Chart (1998)	Peak position
Australia (ARIA)	99
Sweden (Sverigetopplistan)	60
