= Think of You (Whigfield song) =

1995 single by Whigfield

Single by Whigfield

from the album Whigfield
- B-side: "Remix"
- Released: 5 May 1995
- Genre: Eurodance
- Length: 4:16
- Label: Various Labels Internationally
- Songwriters: Davide Riva; Alfredo Larry Pignagnoli; Annerley Gordon
- Producers: Davide Riva; Alfredo Larry Pignagnoli

Whigfield singles chronology
"Another Day" (1994)	"Think of You" (1995)	"Close to You" (1995)

Music video
- "Think of You" on YouTube

"Think of You" is a song recorded by Italian Eurodance project Whigfield, which was performed by Danish-born Sannie Charlotte Carlson. It was written by producers Davide Riva and Alfredo Larry Pignagnoli with Annerley Gordon, and released in May 1995 as the third single from her first album, Whigfield (1995). The single scored success on the charts in Europe, reaching number seven in the UK and becoming a top-10 hit also in Canada, Denmark, Iceland, Ireland, Italy, Lithuania, the Netherlands, Spain and Zimbabwe. On the Eurochart Hot 100, "Think of You" reached number eight in July 1995. The accompanying music video depicts Whigfield as a director at a movie set.

The song became quite notorious in the UK due to the lyrical content of the extended version which featured the line "I need you inside me tonight" — this was changed to "I need you beside me tonight" for the radio & video release.

== Chart performance ==
Like "Saturday Night" and its follow-up single "Another Day", "Think of You" was successful on the charts in Europe. It was a top-5 hit in Denmark (4), Ireland (4), Italy (4), Scotland (4), and Spain, where the single reached its best chart position as number three. Additionally, it also reached the top 10 in Iceland (9), Lithuania, the Netherlands (6), and the United Kingdom. In the latter, it peaked at number seven in its third week on the UK Singles Chart on 11 June 1995. It spent 12 weeks on the chart in total. A moderate hit in UK clubs, it reached number 18 on the UK Dance Singles Chart, while peaking at number 24 on the Record Mirror Club Chart. On the UK on a Pop Tip Club Chart by Music Week, it fared even better, reaching number four. On the Eurochart Hot 100 and MTV European Top 20, "Think of You" peaked at numbers eight and four, respectively. It debuted on the Eurochart Hot 100 as number 43 on June 3, and peaked at number eight five weeks later, on July 1.

Outside Europe, the song charted in Canada, where it peaked at number three on The Record Retail Singles chart, number 66 on the RPM Top Singles chart and number two on the RPM Dance/Urban chart. On the African continent, it was successful in Zimbabwe, reaching number four, and in West Asia, it became a top-30 hit in Israel, peaking at number 23 on 13 June 1995.

== Critical reception ==
AllMusic editor William Cooper described the song as "irresistibly catchy". Mark Dezzani from Billboard magazine labeled it as "tart-pop", "rather than pop-tart", viewing it as "equally catchy" as "Another Day". Chris Heath from The Daily Telegraph named it "her greatest song" and the "summer's most uplifting single". In his weekly UK chart commentary, James Masterton found that "Think of You" "moves more than ever towards being a straightforward narrative song and possibly loses even more of the charm of her first smash hit." Pan-European magazine Music & Media felt "the Dancing Divaz club mix serves this Euro track right especially well, as it highlights the nerve-wrecking synth riff and the one-line chorus in a most hypnotising way."

A reviewer from Music Week gave it a score of four out of five, writing, "Infectious, uncomplicated and guaranteed to complete a hat-trick of hits for the lyrically-challenged Dane. She has to resort to her cutesy diddly-doos towards the end but the happy vibe lasts the full four minutes." James Hamilton of the Record Mirror Dance Update named it a "typically sing-song but quite suggestively worded cheerful shrill pop romp". Also Tony Cross from Smash Hits gave "Think of You" four out of five, saying, "So what if this sounds like her other two hits; you can sing to it, you can dance to it, and it's fun. Now cheer up and get into Whiggy — it's pop so sweet you can sprinkle it on your strawberries."

== Music video ==
In the music video for "Think of You", Whigfield plays a director, performing at a movie set. She is dressed in a red suit and her hair is darker than in her previous music videos. She directs and several workers are carrying and placing white pillars and statues around on the set. Sometimes Whigfield sings, while sitting in the director chair, other times she sits on a movie crane. Towards the end, everyone leaves the set, while Whigfield is left alone, singing while she is walking in between the pillars. The video was filmed in Italy and A-listed on Dutch music television channel TMF in July 1995. It was also B-listed on Germany's VIVA and MTV Europe put it on break out rotation same month. On British The Box, "Think of You" was a Box Top for 9 weeks. The video was later made available on YouTube by Energy Records in 2013, and had generated more than five million views as of late 2025.

== Track listing ==
- 7" single, Germany
1. "Think of You" (Radio Edit) — 4:16
2. "Think of You" (M.B.R.G. Remix) — 4:34
- 12", Italy
1. "Think of You" (Extended Version) — 5:20
2. "Think of You" (M.B.R.G. Remix) — 4:31
3. "Think of You" (David Club Mix) — 5:49
4. "Think of You" (Dancing Divaz Club Mix) — 7:38
- CD single, UK & Europe
1. "Think of You" (Radio Edit) — 4:03
2. "Think of You" (David Remix) — 5:51
3. "Think of You" (Extended X UK) — 5:21
4. "Think of You" (Dancing Divaz Club Mix) — 7:39
5. "Think of You" (MBRG Remix) — 4:31
- CD maxi, Canada
1. "Think of You" (Extended Mix) — 5:26
2. "Think of You" (MBRG Remix) — 4:37
3. "Think of You" (David Remix) — 5:55
4. "Think of You" (Radio Version) — 4:19
5. "Think of You" (Dancing Divaz Club Mix) — 7:39
- CD maxi, Denmark
1. "Think of You" (Radio Version) — 4:15
2. "Think of You" (Extended) — 5:20
3. "Think of You" (David Remix) — 5:49
4. "Think of You" (Dancing Divaz Remix) — 7:38
- CD maxi, Germany
1. "Think of You" (Radio Edit) — 4:16
2. "Think of You (Extended Version) — 5:23
3. "Think of You" (MBRG Remix) — 4:34
4. "Think of You" (David Club Mix) — 5:51
5. "Think of You" (Dancing Divaz Club Mix) — 7:39
- CD maxi, Netherlands
1. "Think of You" (Radio Version) — 4:15
2. "Think of You" (Extended Version) — 5:20
3. "Think of You" (MBRG Remix) — 4:31
4. "Think of You" (David Remix) — 5:49
5. "Think of You" (Dancing Divaz Club Mix) — 7:38
- CD maxi, UK
1. "Think of You" (Radio Edit)
2. "Think of You" (David Remix)
3. "Think of You" (Extended X UK)
4. "Think of You" (Dancing Divaz Club Mix)
5. "Think of You" (MBRG Remix)
- EP – Australia
1. "Think of You" (Radio Edit)
2. "Think of You" (David Club Mix)
3. "Think of You" (MBRG Remix)
4. "Think of You" (Dancing Divaz Club Mix)
5. "Think of You" (Extended Version)
6. "Think of You" (DMC Remix)

== Remixes ==
In 2007, Whigfield released her first single in three years, a re-release of the original from 1995, which was reworked and updated with new sounds. The single was available in two formats, "Think of You" (Banana Mixes) and "Think of You" (Pineapple Mixes). However, in Italy the two formats are all on one release.

Pineapple mixes

1. "Think of You" (Gabry Ponte Remix) — 5:55
2. "Think of You" (Gabry Ponte Remix Instrumental) — 6:01
3. "Think of You" (Gabry Ponte Remix Radio Edit) — 2:55
4. "Think of You" (Original Album Mix) — 3:34
5. "Think of You" (Mathieu Bouthier & Muttonheads Remix) — 5:16
6. "Think of You" (Mathieu Bouthier & Muttonheads Remix Instrumental) — 5:41
7. "Think of You" (Mathieu Bouthier & Muttonheads Remix Radio Edit) — 3:23

Banana mixes

1. "Think of You" (SunLoverz Big Room Remix) — 6:04
2. "Think of You" (SunLoverz Big Room Remix Instrumental) — 6:04
3. "Think of You" (SunLoverz Big Room Remix Radio Edit) — 3:13
4. "Think of You" (F&A Factor Remix Extended) — 6:14
5. "Think of You" (F&A Factor Remix Instrumental Radio) — 2:59
6. "Think of You" (F&A Factor Remix Radio Edit) — 2:59
7. "Think of You" (Yan vs. Favretto Remix) — 5:50
8. "Think of You" (Yan vs. Favretto Remix Instrumental) — 5:50

== Charts ==
=== Weekly charts ===
Chart (1995)	Peak position
Belgium (Ultratop 50 Flanders)	12
Belgium (Ultratop 50 Wallonia)	29
Canada Retail Singles (The Record)	3
Canada Top Singles (RPM)	66
Canada Dance/Urban (RPM)	2
Denmark (IFPI	4
Europe (Eurochart Hot 100)	8
Europe (European Dance Radio)	2
Europe (European Hit Radio)	10
Finland (Suomen virallinen lista)	11
France (SNEP)	25
Germany (GfK)	25
Iceland (Íslenski Listinn Topp 40)	9
Ireland (IRMA)	4
Israel (Israeli Singles Chart)	23
Italy (Musica e dischi)	4
Lithuania (M-1)	7
Netherlands (Dutch Top 40)	7
Netherlands (Single Top 100)	6
Quebec (ADISQ)	45
Scotland (OCC)	4
Spain (AFYVE)	3
Switzerland (Schweizer Hitparade)	11
UK Singles (OCC)	7
UK Dance (OCC)	18
UK Airplay (Music Week)	25
UK Club Chart (Music Week)	24
UK Pop Tip Club Chart (Music Week)	4
Zimbabwe (ZIMA)	4

=== Year-end charts ===
Chart (1995)	Position
Belgium (Ultratop 50 Flanders)	97
Canada Dance/Urban (RPM)	17
Europe (Eurochart Hot 100)	73
Iceland (Íslenski Listinn Topp 40)	79
Latvia (Latvijas Top 50)	87
Netherlands (Dutch Top 40)	55
Netherlands (Single Top 100)	69
UK Singles (OCC)	68
UK Pop Tip Club Chart (Music Week)	18
