= Doo Wop (disambiguation) =

Doo Wop is a vocal-based rhythm and blues music style.

Doo Wop or variants may also refer to:

- "Doo Wop (That Thing)", a 1998 song by Lauryn Hill
- Doo Wop (film), a 2004 French film
- Doo Wop, a form of architecture related to Googie architecture
- "Doo-Whop", a 2000 song by Whigfield
- "Doo Wop", a 2017 song by JID from The Never Story

== See also ==
- List of doo-wop musicians
- Doo-Wops & Hooligans, a 2010 album by Bruno Mars
- Wildwoods Shore Resort Historic District, or Doo Wop Motel District, in New Jersey, U.S.
