= Whigfield (album) =

Studio album by Whigfield
- Released: 12 June 1995
- Genres: Pop; dance
- Length: 40:33
- Labels: FLEX; Systematic; Avex Trax
- Producer: Larry Pignagnoli

Whigfield chronology
Whigfield (1995)	Whigfield II (1997)

Professional ratings
Review scores
Source	Rating
AllMusic	2.5/5 stars
The Daily Telegraph	(favorable)
The Guardian	1/5 stars
Music Week	3/5 stars
NME	2/10
Smash Hits	4/5 stars

Whigfield is the debut studio album by Italian Eurodance project Whigfield which was performed by Danish-born Sannie Charlotte Carlson, released in June 1995. It features Whigfield's biggest hit single, "Saturday Night", which reached number one in several European countries.

Six singles were released from the album; "Saturday Night", "Another Day", "Think of You", "Close to You", "Big Time" and "Sexy Eyes".

The album went Gold in Canada, the Philippines and in India; whilst reaching platinum status in South Africa. Over 60 thousands units were sold in the UK (silver certification).

== Releases ==
The album was released in many countries in 1995, while in Australia it was released in 1997. In Japan, the album was titled Saturday Night – Let's Whiggy Dance. The Netherlands received a 2-CD version where the first disc contained remixes and a bonus song, while the second disc featured the original album. In Canada, it featured three additional remixes, the latter being the Megamix.

In Singapore it was called Sexy Eyes – The Album.

In South Korea it was called Big Time – The Album.

In Taiwan it was called Superbox – Super Hits & Remix Collection. It features two discs, one including the tracks from the Whigfield album as well as the tracks "Junto A Ti" and "Gimme Gimme". The second disc included various remixes and had its own cover titled Superbox – Remix Collection.

Some versions (in particular special editions) contained Whigfield's versions of "Last Christmas" and "It's Alright".

Ecuadorian vinyl version includes a Spanish version of Saturday night

== Critical reception ==
Caroline Sullivan from The Guardian commented, "Now that Kylie Minogue has attained respectability, this Danish ex-model replaces her as the main perpetrator of impersonal Eurodisco. 'Saturday Night', the UK's second-biggest-selling single of 1994, here in its tinny glory, is the best thing on the album. Worst is: take your pick - I'm particularly partial to the stuttering 'Sexy Eyes'." Pan-European magazine Music & Media wrote, "Here you get the numbers A1-A10 on jukeboxes in mediterranean holiday resorts this summer and way beyond. The button on the old but reliable Wurlitzer corresponding with current single 'Think of You' will be pressed most. Also keep your finger on the Ace of Base-like pop reggae tune 'Big Time'." A reviewer from Music Week said, "Pulling together all of the hit singles and a few more besides, Whigfield's debut album should attract a few interested parties and prove she's no one hit wonder." Johnny Cigarettes from NME complimented 'Don't Walk Away', "where Whigger's voice suddenly hits the button marked 'passion' and the melody echoes Visage's 'Fade to Grey'", and 'Think of You', "where she sings the startling line "When I think of you, I need you inside me tonight"." Pete Stanton from Smash Hits wrote, "If this album was a drink then it'd be fizzier than Coke. It's the purest of pure pop! From 'Think of You' down to 'Saturday Night' the feel is of summer and let's have a big fat party."

== Track listing ==
Standard version

1. "Think of You" (music: A. Pignagnoli/D. Riva; lyrics: A. Gordon) – 4:16
2. "Another Day" (music: Pignagnoli/Riva; lyrics: Gordon) – 4:07
3. "Don't Walk Away" (music: Pignagnoli/Riva; lyrics: Gordon) – 4:01
4. "Big Time" (music: Pignagnoli/Riva; lyrics: Gordon/P. Sears) – 3:24
5. "Out of Sight" (music: Pignagnoli/Riva; lyrics: Gordon/P. Sears) – 4:02
6. "Close to You" (music: A. Pignagnoli/D. Riva/A. Gordon) – 4:12
7. "Sexy Eyes" (music: Pignagnoli/Riva; lyrics: Gordon/P. Sears) – 3:55
8. "Ain't It Blue" (music: Pignagnoli/Riva; lyrics: Gordon/P. Sears) – 4:46
9. "I Want to Love" (music: Pignagnoli/Riva; lyrics: Gordon/P. Sears) – 4:19
10. "Saturday Night" (music: A. Pignagnoli/D. Riva;lyrics: Pagnagnoli) – 3:46

== Charts ==
=== Weekly charts ===
Weekly chart performance for Whigfield
Chart (1995–1997)	Peak position
Australian Albums (ARIA)	19
Canada Top Albums/CDs (RPM)	18
Dutch Albums (Album Top 100)	23
European Albums (European Top 100 Albums)	54
Finnish Albums (Suomen virallinen lista)	30
German Albums (Offizielle Top 100)	43
Swiss Albums (Schweizer Hitparade)	37
UK Albums (Official Charts)	13

=== Year-end charts ===
1995 year-end chart performance for Whigfield
Chart (1995)	Rank
Canada Top Albums/CDs (RPM)	75
