= 2 Times =

1998 single by Ann Lee

Single by Ann Lee

from the album Dreams
- Released: December 1998
- Length: 3:46
- Label: X-Energy
- Songwriters: Alfredo Larry Pignagnoli; Daniela Galli; Paul Sears; Annerley Gordon
- Producers: Marco Sorcini; Alfredo Larry Pignagnoli

Ann Lee singles chronology
"2 Times" (1998)	"Voices" (1999)

Music video
- "2 Times" on YouTube

"2 Times" is the debut single of English Italian-based singer-songwriter Ann Lee. It was co-written by Lee and released in Italy in December 1998 by X-Energy as the lead single from her debut album, Dreams (1999), and was issued worldwide the following year. The single peaked at number two on the UK Singles Chart, reached number one in Flanders, and entered the top 10 in several countries, including Australia, Germany, Ireland, Italy, and New Zealand. The music video for the song depicted Lee during a day in her life in her hut.

== Background and composition ==
Ann Lee's previous work on a large number of Eurodance projects would help her receive a contract with Alfredo Larry Pignagnoli, with whom she had already worked with on many projects such as Whigfield, Ally & Jo, amongst others. He worked on a track with Marco Sorcini called "Two Times". The song is played in a F major key in common time at a BPM of 132, and throughout follows chord progression F-C7.

== Critical reception ==
A reviewer from Daily Record wrote, "This sounds like a line-dancing song reworked for the techno market, but it's worked for Ann Lee who has already topped the charts across Europe." The Guardian described it as "giddy".

== Commercial performance ==
The song achieved success in many European countries where it was a top-10 hit, particularly in Denmark, Scotland, and the Flanders region of Belgium, where it reached number one. It peaked number two in Ireland, New Zealand and the United Kingdom; it has sold over 500,000 copies in the UK as of 2014. It was also a top-10 hit in Australia after initially receiving frequent airplay on Melbourne radio station KIX FM.

== Music video ==
The song's accompanying music video was released in 1999 by Energy Productions. It sees Ann Lee performing the song during a day in her life, beginning with her waking up in the morning in her hut. She cooks, plays with her doll, takes a stroll on the beach and has a bath in her bathtub. The video ends with Lee sleeping in her bed. The singer has noted that the structure and cinematography of the video was very similar to that of Peter Gabriel's "Sledgehammer"; "The two videos were similar! I remember perfectly the 'sledge video' (love Peter Gabriel!) and my movements are in fact very similar - but I think the similarity ends there". Parts of the music video were filmed in Whitstable, Kent.

== Track listings ==
- Italian 12-inch single

A1. "2 Times" (original extended mix) – 6:32
A2. "2 Times" (G. side) – 5:32
B1. "2 Times" (GambaClub) – 5:14
B2. "2 Times" (GambaDub) – 4:15
B3. "2 Times" (original edit mix) – 3:46

- Italian and Australian CD single
1. "2 Times" (original edit mix) – 3:46
2. "2 Times" (original extended mix) – 6:32
3. "2 Times" (G. side) – 5:32
4. "2 Times" (GambaClub) – 5:14
5. "2 Times" (GambaDub) – 4:15
- German maxi-CD single
1. "2 Times" (original edit mix/radio edit) – 3:46
2. "2 Times" (Gamba club) – 5:14
3. "2 Times" (original extended mix) – 6:32
4. "2 Times" (Gamba dub) – 4:15
5. "2 Times" (G. Side) – 5:32
- German and Dutch CD single
1. "2 Times" (original edit mix) – 3:46
2. "2 Times" (original extended mix) – 6:32
- UK CD single
1. "2 Times" (original radio edit)
2. "2 Times" (Gamba club)
3. "2 Times" (Bulletproof Euro mix)
- UK 12-inch single

A1. "2 Times" (original extended mix)
B1. "2 Times" (Gamba club mix)
B2. "2 Times" (Bulletproof Euro mix)

- UK cassette single
1. "2 Times" (original radio edit)
2. "2 Times" (Gamba club)

== Charts ==
=== Weekly charts ===
Weekly chart performance for "2 Times"
Chart (1999–2000)	Peak position
Australia (ARIA)	4
Austria (Ö3 Austria Top 40)	3
Belgium (Ultratop 50 Flanders)	1
Belgium (Ultratop 50 Wallonia)	6
Canada (Nielsen SoundScan)	14
Canada Dance/Urban (RPM)	13
Denmark (IFPI)	1
Europe (Eurochart Hot 100)	5
France (SNEP)	9
Germany (GfK)	5
Hungary (Mahasz)	10
Iceland (Íslenski Listinn Topp 40)	7
Ireland (IRMA)	2
Italy (FIMI)	3
Netherlands (Dutch Top 40)	4
Netherlands (Single Top 100)	4
New Zealand (Recorded Music NZ)	2
Norway (VG-lista)	4
Scottish Singles Sales (Official Charts)	1
Spain (Promusicae)	13
Sweden (Sverigetopplistan)	14
Switzerland (Schweizer Hitparade)	10
UK Singles (Official Charts)	2
UK Dance (Official Charts)	7

=== Year-end charts ===
Year-end chart performance for "2 Times"
Chart (1999)	Position
Australia (ARIA)	20
Austria (Ö3 Austria Top 40)	15
Belgium (Ultratop 50 Flanders)	12
Belgium (Ultratop 50 Wallonia)	33
Europe (Eurochart Hot 100)	23
Europe Radio (Music & Media)	38
Europe Border Breakers (Music & Media)	7
France (SNEP)	28
Germany (Media Control)	28
Italy (Musica e dischi)	35
Netherlands (Dutch Top 40)	28
Netherlands (Single Top 100)	28
Romania (Romanian Top 100)	32
UK Singles (OCC)	21
UK Pop (Music Week)	5

=== Decade-end charts ===
Chart (1990–1999)	Rank
Austria (Ö3 Austria Top 40)	91

== Certifications ==
Region	Certification	Certified units/sales
Australia (ARIA)	Platinum	70,000^{^}
Austria (IFPI Austria)	Gold	25,000^{*}
Belgium (BRMA)	Platinum	50,000^{*}
France (SNEP)	Gold	250,000^{*}
Germany (BVMI)	Gold	250,000^{^}
New Zealand (RMNZ)	Gold	5,000^{*}
Sweden (GLF)	Gold	15,000^{^}
United Kingdom (BPI)	Gold	500,000
^{*} Sales figures based on certification alone.^{^} Shipments figures based on certification alone.

== Release history ==
Region	Date	Format(s)	Label(s)	Ref.
Italy	December 1998	12-inch vinyl	X-Energy	
Italy	March 1999	CD	X-Energy	
Netherlands	24 April 1999	CD	High Fashion	
Germany	28 April 1999	CD; maxi-CD	ZYX Music	
United Kingdom	4 October 1999	12-inch vinyl; CD; cassette	Systematic	
