= Whigfield III =

Studio album by Whigfield
- Released: October 10, 2000
- Genre: Eurodance
- Label: ToCo International

Whigfield chronology
Whigfield II (1997)	Whigfield III (2000)	4 (2002)

Whigfield III is the third studio album by Italian Eurodance project Whigfield performed by Danish-born model Sannie Charlotte Carlson, released on October 10, 2000.

== Track listing ==
1. Be My Baby
2. Much More
3. Unbelievable
4. Lost in You
5. Makin' My Day
6. Outside
7. Upon a Star
8. All Your Love
9. Mi Amor
10. Waitin' for Saturday
11. Doo-Whop (ABM Edit)
12. Whigfield Megamix (Think of You/Another Day/Saturday Night/Sexy Eyes/Be My Baby)
