= Another Day (Whigfield song) =

1994 single by Whigfield

Single by Whigfield

from the album Whigfield
- Released: 28 November 1994
- Genre: Eurodance; dance-pop
- Length: 4:00
- Label: X-Energy; ZYX Music; Systematic
- Songwriters: Larry Pignagnoli; Davide Riva; Annerley Gordon; Ray Dorset
- Producers: Larry Pignagnoli; Davide Riva

Whigfield singles chronology
"Saturday Night" (1992)	"Another Day" (1994)	"Think of You" (1995)

Music video
- "Another Day" on YouTube

"Another Day" is a song by Italian Eurodance project Whigfield, fronted by Danish-born Sannie Charlotte Carlson. It was released in November 1994 by X-Energy, ZYX Music and Systematic as the second single from her debut album, Whigfield (1995). Written by producers Larry Pignagnoli and Davide Riva, with Annerley Gordon and Ray Dorset, the song was the follow-up single to Whigfield's 1994 hit single, "Saturday Night", and peaked at number seven in the United KIngdom. "Another Day" also became a top-10 hit in Canada, Denmark, Finland, Ireland, Israel, Italy, Norway, Peru, Spain, Switzerland and Zimbabwe.

== Critical reception ==
Swedish Aftonbladet named "Another Day" "a very good song", noting that it was very similar to "Saturday Night". AllMusic editor William Cooper described it as "irresistibly catchy". Larry Flick from Billboard magazine found that it's "flying over the top with giddy kiddie flavors", noting that "the beats have breakneck energy, and the synths have a shiny, candy-coated flavor." Chris Heath from The Daily Telegraph felt it was "much-underestimated". Ross Jones from The Guardian named it "fabulous". Giles Smith from The Independent wrote, "It has a stock night-club drum beat, a few synthesisers plunking and juddering. This time, she informs us that she's running around and that she can't live another day without us." In his weekly UK chart commentary, James Masterton stated, "'Another Day' is in some ways the better record of the two, being more of a proper song rather than 'Saturday Night''s sequence of lyrical set-pieces."

Music Week wrote, "Take the bass and keyboards from 'Saturday Night' and add a touch of Mungo Jerry's 'In the Summertime', and there you have it, the follow-up to a million seller. For those who liked 'Saturday Night', it is inevitably a disappointment; for those who didn't, it's better than you'd expect." John Kilgo from The Network Forty stated that here's "a very poppy uptempo dance number that will explode—especially at night." He added that Whigfield's "unique vocals and high-energy groove are the perfect combination for a great follow-up". Johnny Cigarettes from NME said, "In short, it's the Mini-Pops singing 'In the Summertime' by Mungo Jerry to a squelchy beat and the piano riff from 'Saturday Night' played sideways." Colin Paterson from The Observer found that the follow-up "was the identical 'Another Day'. A case of Saturday Night, Sunday Mourning." James Hamilton from the Record Mirror Dance Update named it "another horribly happy Danish squawker" in his weekly dance column.

== Chart performance ==
"Another Day" was quite successful on the charts across Europe, peaking at number three in Italy and number five in both Denmark and Ireland. The song was a top-10 hit also in Finland (8), Norway (9), Spain (6), Switzerland (9), and the UK (7). In the latter, it peaked at number seven after five weeks on the UK Singles Chart, where the song debuted at number 13 on 4 December 1994. Additionally, it was a top-20 hit in Germany (12) and a top-30 hit in France (24) and Iceland (22).

On the Eurochart Hot 100, "Another Day" reached number 11 on 14 January 1995, in its fourth week on the chart, after charting in Denmark, Germany, Ireland, Italy, Netherlands, Switzerland and the UK. Outside Europe, it entered the top 10 in Canada, where the single reached number two on both The Record Retail Singles chart and the RPM Dance/Urban chart. In the United States, it charted on the Billboard Hot Dance Club Play chart, peaking at number 21. In Zimbabwe, it reached number five. In Israel, "Another Day" peaked at number seven on 3 January 1995, with a total of 6 weeks inside the top 30. In Latin America, it became a top-10 hit in Peru. The single was awarded with a silver record in the United Kingdom, with 200,000 singles shipped.

== Music video ==
The accompanying music video for "Another Day" can be seen as a continuation of the video for "Saturday Night". In the beginning, Whigfield arrives at a restaurant where she is supposed to meet someone. The person never shows up and Whigfield are sitting all by herself, singing. A couple sitting next to her have an argument and the woman throws the contents of the glass in the man's face. Next, some scenes show Whigfield waiting for someone in a theater, while other scenes show her sitting in the stairs while people come and go. In the end, she drives by taxi to the hotel where she lives and packs her things. The picture of the man she kissed in the front of the mirror in the video of "Saturday Night" is placed on the bedside table in her room. Whigfield lets the picture fall to the floor and leaves the hotel room. "Another Day" received active rotation on MTV Europe and was A-listed on German music television channel VIVA in February 1995. It was later made available on YouTube by Energy TV in 2013, and had generated more than five million views as of late 2025 on the platform.

== Track listings ==
- UK: CD-maxi: Systematic
1. "Another Day" (Radio Nite Mix)
2. "Another Day" (Club Remix)
3. "Another Day" (Nite Mix)
4. "Another Day" (Another Mix)
5. "Another Day" (Two Man Remix)
- Germany: CD-maxi: ZYX Music
1. "Another Day" (Radio Nite Mix)
2. "Another Day" (Bubble Gum Radio)
3. "Another Day" (Bubble Gum Mix)
4. "Another Day" (Nite Mix)
- Netherlands: CD-maxi: Dino Music
1. "Another Day" (Radio Nite Mix) 4:04
2. "Another Day" (Bubble Gum Radio) 4:01
3. "Another Day" (Nite Mix) 5:00
4. "Another Day" (Radio Nite Mix) 4:02
- Denmark: CD-maxi
1. "Another Day" (Radio Nite Mix)
2. "Another Day" (Bubble Gum Radio)
3. "Another Day" (Nite Mix)
4. "Another Day" (Bubble Gum Mix)
- Australia: CD single
1. "Another Day" (Radio Nite Mix)
2. "Another Day" (Club Remix)
3. "Another Day" (BubbleGum Radio Mix)
4. "Another Day" (Two Men Remix)
5. "Another Day" (Another Day Mix)
6. "Another Day" (Nite Mix)
7. "Another Day" (Out of Time Remix)
8. "Another Day" (French Remix)

== Charts ==
=== Weekly charts ===
Chart (1994–1995)	Peak position
Belgium (Ultratop 50 Flanders)	32
Canada Retail Singles (The Record)	2
Canada Top Singles (RPM)	27
Canada Dance/Urban (RPM)	2
Denmark (IFPI)	5
Europe (Eurochart Hot 100)	11
Europe (European Dance Radio)	5
Europe (European Hit Radio)	20
Finland (Suomen virallinen lista)	8
France (SNEP)	24
Germany (GfK)	12
Iceland (Íslenski Listinn Topp 40)	22
Ireland (IRMA)	5
Israel (Israeli Singles Chart)	7
Italy (Musica e dischi)	3
Netherlands (Dutch Top 40)	32
Netherlands (Single Top 100)	41
Norway (VG-lista)	9
Peru (UPI)	8
Quebec (ADISQ)	14
Scotland (OCC)	7
Spain (AFYVE)	6
Sweden (Sverigetopplistan)	39
Switzerland (Schweizer Hitparade)	9
UK Singles (OCC)	7
UK Airplay (Music Week)	30
UK Club Chart (Music Week)	46
US Hot Dance Club Play (Billboard)	21
Zimbabwe (ZIMA)	5

=== Year-end charts ===
Chart (1994)	Position
UK Singles (OCC)	86

Chart (1995)	Position
Canada Dance/Urban (RPM)	24
Europe (Eurochart Hot 100)	92
Germany (Media Control)	94
Latvia (Latvijas Top 50)	98
Norway Winter Period (VG-lista)	20

== Certifications ==
Region	Certification	Certified units/sales
United Kingdom (BPI)	Silver	200,000^{^}
^{^} Shipments figures based on certification alone.

== Release history ==
Region	Date	Format(s)	Label(s)	Ref.
Europe	29 August 1994	CD	ZYX Music	
United Kingdom	28 November 1994	7-inch vinyl; 12-inch vinyl; CD; cassette	Systematic	
