= Doo-Whop =

- CD single – Canada

Single by Whigfield

from the album Whigfield III
- Released: 13 April 2000
- Recorded: 1999
- Genre: Pop, dance
- Length: 3:26
- Label: X-Energy Records, ZYX Music, Vale Music, Popular Records
- Songwriter(s): Annerley Gordon, Alle Benassi, Daniela Galli, Marco Benassi, Paul Sears
- Producer(s): Alle Benassi, Marco Benassi, Ottavio Bacciocchi

Whigfield singles chronology
"Be My Baby"" (1999)	"Doo-Whop" (2000)	"Much More" (2000)

Music video
- "Doo-Whop" on YouTube

Doo-Whop is a song written by Annerley Gordon, Alle Benassi, Daniela Galli, Marco Benassi, and Paul Sears, and recorded by Danish singer Whigfield. It was released in 2000 as the second single from Whigfield III

== Track listing ==
CD single – Canada

1. Doo-Whop (ABM original edit) 3:26
2. Doo-Whop (ABM extended) 5:09
3. Doo-Whop (Rivaz Tune Club) 5:50
4. Doo-Whop (G.Side extended) 5:05

Bonus cuts

1. Gimme Gimme (original Vox radio) 4:07
2. Gimme Gimme (original Vox extended) 6:19

== Notes ==
Mastered At OFF LIMITS Rec.Studios Licensed From Energy Production Srl. "Doo-Whop" published by Off Limits / Energy Prod. "Gimme Gimme" published by SFR Music / B. Mikilski Publishing. All tracks ℗ 2000 Energy Productions Srl., courtesy of Popular Records Inc, under exclusive license. ℗&© 2000 Popular Records Inc. Manufactured and marketed by Popular Records Inc. Made in Canada.

== Charts ==
Chart	Peak position
Canada (Canadian Hot 100)	20
