= Fun Fun =

Italian Italo disco band

- Origin: Italy
- Genres: Italo disco; Synth-pop; hi-NRG; Eurobeat
- Years active: 1983–present
- Label: Polydor
- Members: Francesca Merola; Natalia Rolla; Roberta Servelli; Elena Trastulli; Antonella Pepe; Angela Parisi; Ivana Spagna

Fun Fun are an Italian Italo disco band formed in 1983. Their hits included "Colour My Love" and "Baila Bolero".

== History ==
Producers Dario Raimondi and Alvaro Ugolini teamed up with studio vocalists Antonella Pepe, Angela Parisi and Ivana Spagna to create Fun Fun, a band with a bouncy, high-energy, dancefloor-friendly sound. Their first release, 1983's "Happy Station", was successful in Italy and other parts of Europe thanks to several extended mixes, including the most well-known "Scratch" version. "Happy Station" reached the number one spot in the South African charts. It was also popular in the Chicago House Dance scene and was played by DJs on WBMX.

Upon receiving invitations for live performances, Raimondi and Ugolini decided to use models for Fun Fun's public image rather than the vocalists themselves, a common tactic in the European dance music scene already deployed by producers like Frank Farian. Have Fun!, the band's first full album from 1984, featured Francesca Merola and Roberta Servelli as the on-stage faces for the group. The album featured other popular dance singles, including "Give Me Your Love," "Living In Japan" and the band's soft-ballad signature hit "Colour My Love", which became popular in American nightclubs due to its insistent synth bassline and easily mixable percussion intro.

After Have Fun!, Spagna decided to leave the project to start a solo career, occasionally contributing as lyricist for the band. Fun Fun continued on with Merola and Elena Trastulli (who replaced Servelli) as the face of the group and a new musician/producer Larry Pignagnoli, releasing a second album, 1987's Double Fun. Double Fun had several singles, including "Could This Be Love", a cover of Spencer Davis Group's "Gimme Some Lovin'" and "Baila Bolero", a Flamenco-flavored dance ballad. A mini-anthology featuring most of the group's major hits, the "Mega Hit Mix", was released on a 12" single soon afterward.

Fun Fun tried a new direction in 1989 with the single "Give Me Love", which had only minimal success. Several years later, the band released its final single, "I'm Needin' You", in a 1990s Eurodance style, to equally minimal success. Since then, the only Fun Fun releases have been best-of compilations or DJ remixes/reconstructions of their previous hits.

Following the break-up of the band, Angela Parisi released a single, "Wherever Forever", before retiring from the music industry. Antonella Pepe went on to become an appreciated vocalist, recording with Mike Francis, Via Verdi, Alan Sorrenti, Garbo and Gianni Togni. Of the girls fronting the group, Elena Trastulli had a career as backing vocalist. Natalia Rolla became a film production designer.

In 2022, a further single was released (in Italy) under the Fun Fun name featuring contributions by original vocalists Angela Parisi and Antonella Pepe, backed by songwriter Annerley Gordon.

== Discography ==
=== Studio albums ===
- Have Fun! (1984)
- Double Fun (1987)

=== Compilation albums ===
- The Best of Fun Fun (ZYX Records, 1991)
- The Best of Fun Fun (Snake's Music, 1994)
- Greatest Fun: The Best Of (1994)
- The Best of Fun Fun: Color My Love
- The Best of Fun Fun (Discos CNR Chile, 2003)
- The Greatest Fun (2006)
- Greatest Hits & Remixes (2017)

=== Singles ===
Title	Year	Peak chart positions							Certifications	Album
Title	Year	AUT	BEL (FLA)	GER	NLD	SWE	SWI	US Dance	Certifications	Album
"Happy Station"	1983	15	1	11	8	—	—	—		Have Fun!
"Colour My Love"	1984	—	8	17	15	6	—	9		Have Fun!
"Give Me Your Love"	1984	—	28	17	18	18	10	23		Have Fun!
"Living in Japan"	1985	—	—	—	—	—	—	—		Have Fun!
"Sing Another Song"	1985	—	—	—	—	—	—	—		Have Fun!
"Tell Me"	1985	—	—	—	—	—	—	—		Have Fun!
"Baila Bolero"	1986	—	31	—	17	—	16	—		Double Fun
"Gimme Some Lovin'"	1987	—	37	—	71	—	—	—		Double Fun
"Could This Be Love"	1987	—	—	—	85	—	—	—		Double Fun
"Mega Hit Mix"	1987	—	7	—	4	—	—	—		Single only
"Give Me Love"	1989	—	—	—	—	—	—	29		Single only
"I'm Needin' You"	1994	—	—	—	—	—	—	—		
"No More Tears"	2022	—	—	—	—	—	—	—		Greatest Fun: The Best Of
"—" denotes items which were not released in that country or failed to chart.

== See also ==
- List of Italo disco artists and songs
- Music of Italy
