= Sexy Eyes (Whigfield song) =

1996 single by Whigfield

Single by Whigfield

from the album Whigfield
- Released: 25 March 1996
- Genre: Eurodance
- Length: 3:56
- Label: BMG
- Songwriters: Annerley Gordon; Alfredo Larry Pignagnoli; Davide Riva; Paul Sears
- Producers: Alfredo Larry Pignagnoli; Davide Riva

Whigfield singles chronology
"Last Christmas" (1995)	"Sexy Eyes" (1996)	"Gimme Gimme" (1996)

Music video
- "Sexy Eyes" on YouTube

"Sexy Eyes" is a song written by Annerley Gordon, Alfredo Larry Pignagnoli, Davide Riva and Paul Sears and performed by Danish singer Whigfield. It was released in March 1996, by BMG, as the seventh and final single from her first album, Whigfield. The song is produced by Pignagnoli and Riva, and became Whigfield's first top-10 hit in Australia, becoming the 19th-highest-selling single for 1997. The accompanying music video was directed by Giacomo de Simone and filmed in Italy.

== Chart performance ==
"Sexy Eyes" went on to become a major hit on the charts in both Australia and Europe. In Europe, the single managed to climb into the top 10 in Austria, Latvia and Spain. In Austria, it was Whigfield's second top-10 hit. Additionally, it was a top-20 hit in Denmark, Germany and Switzerland, as well as on the Eurochart Hot 100, where it reached number 17 in June 1996. In the United Kingdom, the "Sexy Eyes" remixes reached number 68 on the UK Singles Chart and number 37 on the Scottish Singles Chart in 1998. Outside Europe, the song was very successful in Australia, peaking at number six, becoming the 19th highest-selling single for 1997 there. It also earned a platinum record there, with a sale of 70,000 singles.

== Music video ==
The music video for "Sexy Eyes" was directed by Italian director Giacomo de Simone and filmed in Porto Venere, Italy. It begins with Whigfield arriving town, driving in her car. This time she has curls in her hair and wears black sunglasses. The singer leaves her car, brings a silver hard case with her and dances on her way through the narrow alleys of the city. She stops by a gypsy woman, who sells white porcelain cats, but refuses to buy when the woman offers her one. Along the way, three white-dressed sailors suddenly appear, chasing and dancing with Whigfield. A scene shows her kissing one of them. Then the sailors disappear, one by one. At the end of the video, back in her car, Whigfield opens her hard case, which reveals three porcelain cats inside. As the singer drives away, the three sailors appears in her car.

== Track listing ==
- Netherlands CD-maxi – Danza
1. "Sexy Eyes" (David's epic edit – single version)
2. "Sexy Eyes" (MBRG edit)
3. "Sexy Eyes" (album version)
4. "Sexy Eyes" (extended album version)
5. "Sexy Eyes" (David's epic experience)
6. "Sexy Eyes" (original MBRG)
- Mexico CD-Maxi – Musart
1. "Sexy Eyes" (David's epic edit)
2. "Sexy Eyes" (MBRG edit)
3. "Sexy Eyes" (album version)
4. "Sexy Eyes" (David's epic experience)
5. "Sexy Eyes" (original MBRG)
6. "Out of Sight"
- Germany CD-Maxi – ZYX Music/Australia CD-Maxi – Transistor Music
1. "Sexy Eyes" (David's epic edit)
2. "Sexy Eyes" (MBRG edit)
3. "Sexy Eyes" (album version)
4. "Sexy Eyes" (David's epic experience)
5. "Sexy Eyes" (original MBRG)
6. "Out of Sight"
7. "Junto a Ti (Close to You)"
- Germany: CD-Maxi – ZYX Music: Remixes
1. "Sexy Eyes" (original MBRG radio edit)
2. "Sexy Eyes" (Amen remix)
3. "Sexy Eyes" (Davids epic experience mix)
- Australian EP
1. "Sexy Eyes" (Single Version)
2. "Sexy Eyes" (Mbrg Edit)
3. "Sexy Eyes"
4. "Sexy Eyes" (Extended Version)
5. "Sexy Eyes" (David's Epic Experience)
6. "Sexy Eyes" (Original Mbrg)
7. "Sexy Eyes" (Amen Remix)

== Charts ==
=== Weekly charts ===
Chart (1996–1997)	Peak position
Australia (ARIA)	6
Austria (Ö3 Austria Top 40)	7
Belgium (Ultratop 50 Flanders)	30
Europe (Eurochart Hot 100)	23
Germany (GfK)	14
Latvia (Latvijas Top 50)	7
Netherlands (Dutch Top 40)	30
Netherlands (Single Top 100)	21
Spain (AFYVE)	4
Switzerland (Schweizer Hitparade)	12
UK Pop Tip Club Chart (Music Week)	21

Chart (1998)	Peak position
Scotland Singles (OCC) "Sexy Eyes" remixes	37
UK Singles (OCC) "Sexy Eyes" remixes	68
UK Independent Singles (OCC) "Sexy Eyes" remixes	10

=== Year-end charts ===
Chart (1996)	Position
Germany (Media Control)	63
Latvia (Latvijas Top 50)	85

Chart (1997)	Position
Australia (ARIA)	19

== Certifications ==
Region	Certification	Certified units/sales
Australia (ARIA)	Platinum	70,000^{^}
^{^} Shipments figures based on certification alone.
