= Voices (Ann Lee song) =

Single by Ann Lee

from the album Dreams
- Released: 1999
- Genre: Eurodance
- Length: 3:32
- Label: High Fashion Music; Panic Records; SweMix Records; X-Energy Records; ZYX Music
- Songwriters: Annerley Gordon; Marco Soncini; Paul Sears
- Producers: Marco Soncini; Alfredo Larry Pignagnoli

Ann Lee singles chronology
"2 Times" (1999)	"Voices" (1999)	"Ring My Bell" (2000)

Music video
- "Voices" on YouTube

"Voices" is a 1999 song recorded by British Italian-based singer Ann Lee. As the follow-up to her successful hit "2 Times", it was co-written by Lee with Marco Soncini and Paul Sears, and released on her debut album, Dreams (1999). The single was a moderate success in Europe, peaking within the top 10 in the Czech Republic, Denmark (number three) and Spain. Additionally it reached the top 20 in Austria, Belgium and Scotland. In 2000, it peaked at number 27 on the UK Singles Chart. On the Eurochart Hot 100, it reached number 55 in November 1999. The accompanying music video for "Voices" sees Ann Lee performing in a forest, among giant mushrooms.

== Track listing ==
- 12" single, Italy (1999)
1. "Voices" (Original Extended) – 6:35
2. "Voices" (Funk J.A. Extended) – 5:31
3. "Voices" (G. Side) – 5:51
4. "Voices" (Funk J.A. Dub) – 5:15
- CD single, Netherlands (1999)
1. "Voices" (CTO Radio Edit) – 3:30
2. "Voices" (Original Edit) – 4:01
- CD maxi, Italy (1999)
1. "Voices" (Original Edit) – 4:01
2. "Voices" (Funk J.A. Extended) – 5:51
3. "Voices" (G. Side) – 5:51
4. "Voices" (Original Extended) – 6:35
5. "Voices" (Funk J.A. Dub) – 5:15
- CD single, UK (2000)
1. "Voices" (Original Edit) – 3:34
2. "Voices" (Alterain Remix Edit) – 3:52
3. "2 Times" (Masterboy-Beat-Production Remix) – 5:44
- CD maxi, Germany (2000)
1. "Voices" (Radio Edit) – 3:16
2. "Voices" (Do Do Do Edit) – 4:01
3. "Voices" (Snapshot Remix) – 4:19
4. "Voices" (Alterain Remix Edit) – 3:47
5. "Voices" (Extended Organ Remix) – 6:34
6. "Voices" (Bulletproof Remix) – 6:31
7. "Voices" (Snapshot Club Remix) – 5:43

== Charts ==
Weekly chart performance for "Voices"
Chart (1999–2000)	Peak position
Australia (ARIA)	131
Austria (Ö3 Austria Top 40)	18
Belgium (Ultratop 50 Flanders)	13
Germany (GfK)	53
Denmark (IFPI)	3
Europe (Eurochart Hot 100)	55
France (SNEP)	57
Italy (Musica e dischi)	42
Netherlands (Dutch Top 40 Tipparade)	6
Netherlands (Single Top 100)	55
Scotland (OCC)	17
Spain (AFYVE)	6
UK Singles (OCC)	27

Annual chart rankings for "Voices"
Chart (1999)	Rank
European Airplay (Border Breakers)	55
