= Colour My Love =

1984 single by Fun Fun

"Color My Love"

Single by Fun Fun

from the album Have Fun!
- B-side: "Happy Station (Scratch Remix)"
- Released: 1984
- Genre: Eurodisco; Italo disco
- Length: 7:22 (album version); 3:58 (single version)
- Label: X-Energy
- Songwriters: Dario Raimondi; Alfredo Pignagnoli; Ivana Spagna
- Producers: Dario Raimondi; Alvaro Ugolini

Fun Fun singles chronology
"Happy Station" (1983)	"Color My Love" (1984)	"Give Me Your Love" (1984)

Audio
- "Colour My Love" on YouTube

"Color My Love" is a song by Italian Italo disco band Fun Fun, released in 1984 as the second single from their debut studio album, Have Fun! (1984).

== Reception ==
Italian writer Rocco Bargioni noted that "countries in the world that missed out on the first single, Happy Station, took notice of Fun Fun with their second single, Color My Love, thanks to the bouncy intro that can even be mixed with the Fifth Symphony.".

== Track listings ==
- Italian 7-inch single

A. "Colour My Love" – 3:58
B. "Happy Station" (Scratch Mix) – 3:17

- Italian 12-inch single

A. "Colour My Love" (Club Mix) – 7:40
B1. "Colour My Love" (Instrumental Mix) – 6:07
B2. "Colour My Love" (Bonus Beats) – 4:44

== Credits and personnel ==
- Dario Raimondi – songwriter, producer, mixing
- Alfredo Pignagnoli – songwriter, arranger
- Ivana Spagna – songwriter
- Alvaro Ugolini – producer, mixing
- Mario Flores – engineering
- Marcello Spiridioni – mastering

Credits and personnel adapted from the Have Fun! album and 7-inch single liner notes.

== Charts ==
=== Weekly charts ===
Weekly chart performance for "Colour My Love"
Chart (1984)	Peak position
Australia (Kent Music Report)	49
Belgium (Ultratop 50 Flanders)	8
Netherlands (Dutch Top 40)	10
Netherlands (Single Top 100)	15
South Africa (Springbok Radio)	5
Sweden (Sverigetopplistan)	6
US Hot Dance Club Play (Billboard)	9
West Germany (GfK)	17

=== Year-end charts ===
Year-end chart performance for "Colour My Love"
Chart (1984)	Position
Netherlands (Dutch Top 40)	96
