= Close to You (Whigfield song) =

1995 single by Whigfield

Single by Whigfield

from the album Whigfield
- Released: 28 August 1995
- Genre: Pop
- Length: 4:07
- Label: X-Energy; Systematic
- Songwriters: Annerley Gordon; Alfredo Pignagnoli; Davide Riva
- Producers: Larry Pignagnoli; Davide Riva

Whigfield singles chronology
"Think of You" (1995)	"Close to You" (1995)	"Big Time" (1995)

Music video
- "Close to You" on YouTube

"Close to You" is a song by Italian Eurodance project Whigfield, performed by Danish-born Sannie Charlotte Carlson and released in August 1995 by labels X-Energy and Systematic as the fourth single from her first album, Whigfield (1995). It was written by Annerley Gordon with its producers Alfredo Pignagnoli and Davide Riva. "Close to You" was also Whigfield's first ballad and a top-20 hit in Denmark, Ireland, Spain and the United Kingdom. On the Eurochart Hot 100, it reached number 67. In Brazil, "Close to You" was the soundtrack (in Spanish) to a famous soap opera.

== Critical reception ==
Larry Flick from Billboard magazine wrote about the song, "Wisely, Whigfield broadens its stylistic palette slightly by issuing a jam fueled by a chugging faux-funk beat. The wall of glistening keyboards raises the sugar quotient of the song's cutie-pie vocals and "ooh-baby-baby" lyrics to potentially diabetic heights. Is it good for ya? Nah! But what guilty pleasure ever is?" James Masterton for Dotmusic viewed it as "a soaring romantic ballad which calls for a powerful voice that Whigfield just about manages to supply." Ross Jones from The Guardian named it a "Streisand-esque slowie". Music Week gave it two out of five, saying that "after a trio of delightful frothy pop successes, Whigfield goes balladeering but her harsh voice jars with the undoubted sweetness of the song." Johnny Cigarettes from NME called it a "robo-ballad". Pete Stanton from Smash Hits felt it "is as mushy and sweet as a lime-flavoured Mr Slushy".

== Chart performance ==
Not as successful as her first three singles, "Close to You" still was a moderate hit in Europe. It was a top-20 hit in Denmark (18), Ireland (18), Spain (19) and the United Kingdom. In the latter, the single peaked at number 13 on 10 September 1995, during its second week on the UK Singles Chart. It spent a total of 7 weeks within the chart, and also entered the top 40 in Iceland (33) and top 100 in Germany (90). On the Eurochart Hot 100, "Close to You" peaked at number 67 in its first week on the chart on September 23, after charting in Denmark, Ireland and the UK.

== Music video ==
A music video was produced to promote the single. It pays homage to the paintings of American artist Edward Hopper such as Automat, Morning Sun, and Office in a Small City. It begins with Carlson glancing and singing at an open window without glass while she is lounging in bed. Other scenes are showing her performing at a grand piano while a man is playing on it. Occasionally, several different people are seen lying, sitting or standing alone on their own by the open window. All of them in the same old style. In the end, these people are sitting next to each other outside, all of them lounging in the sun, finally slowly fading away until the chairs are empty and leaves are blowing in the wind. "Close to You" was a Box Top on British music television channel The Box for six weeks in the fall of 1995.

== Track listings ==
- UK: CD-maxi 1: Systematic
1. "Close to You" 4:07
2. "Saturday Night" (classic vocal mix) 9:18
3. "Another Day" (The French remix) 4:39
- UK: CD-maxi 2: Systematic
1. "Close to You" 4:07
2. "It's Alright" 4:42
3. "Saturday Night"/"Another Day" (The Canadian Mega mix) 10:20
- Spain: CD-maxi: Systemic
1. "Close to You" (single version) 4:07
2. "Close to You" (Down Town remix) 4:56
3. "Think of You" (DMC remix) 7:07
- Australian EP
1. "Close to You" (radio edit)
2. "Close to You" (Downtown remix)
3. "Ain't it Blue" (original version)

== Charts ==
Chart (1995)	Peak position
Australia (ARIA)	170
Denmark (IFPI)	18
Europe (Eurochart Hot 100)	67
Germany (GfK)	90
Iceland (Íslenski Listinn Topp 40)	33
Ireland (IRMA)	18
Scotland (OCC)	11
Spain (AFYVE)	19
UK Singles (OCC)	13
