= Whigfield =

Italian-Danish singer (born 1970)

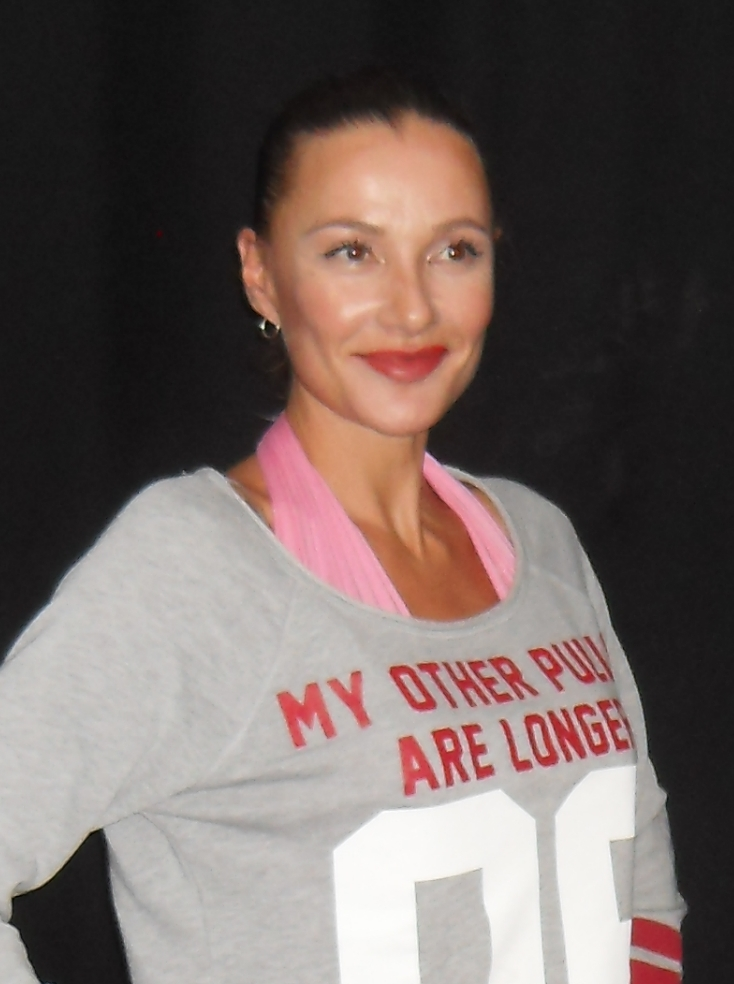
- Whigfield in 2013

Background information
- Also known as: Naan; Sannie
- Born: Sannie Charlotte Carlson; 11 April 1970 (age 56); Skælskør, Sjælland, Denmark
- Origin: Italy
- Genres: Eurodance; dance; pop
- Occupations: Singer; Model; Songwriter; Record producer
- Years active: 1993–present
- Website: whigfield.com

Sannie Charlotte Carlson (born 11 April 1970), also known as Whigfield, Sannie, or Naan, is an Italian-Danish singer, former model, songwriter, and record producer. She is best known for her 1993 single "Saturday Night", which became an international hit the following year.

Based in Italy at the time, Carlson collaborated with Italian producer Larry Pignagnoli, and "Saturday Night" entered the top five in Italy. The single "Another Day" also peaked at number three in Italy. Additionally, the single "Sexy Eyes" charted in various markets, along with "Another Day" and "Think of You", both of which entered the top ten in the United Kingdom, Switzerland, Norway, and her native Denmark. A cover version of Last Christmas, coupled with an original composition Big Time, was the outfit's final UK Top 40 hit in December 1995.

Carlson competed in the Dansk Melodi Grand Prix 2018 with the song "Boys on Girls" but did not qualify for the superfinal.

== Early life ==
Carlson was born in Skælskør, Denmark. As a child, she spent several years in Africa before returning to her native country. Prior to her singing career, Carlson worked as a model and studied music. She performed in a duo before meeting producer Larry Pignagnoli, at which point she adopted the name "Whigfield".

== Discography ==
=== Studio albums ===
Title	Album details	Peak chart positions							Certifications
Title	Album details	AUS	CAN	FIN	GER	NLD	SWI	UK	Certifications
Whigfield	Released: 12 June 1995; Label: X-Energy; Formats: LP, CD, cassette	19	18	30	43	23	37	13	UK: Silver
Whigfield II	Released: 10 November 1997; Label: X-Energy; Formats: CD, cassette	—	—	—	—	—	—	—	
Whigfield III	Released: 10 October 2000; Label: ToCo International; Formats: CD, cassette	—	—	—	—	—	—	—	
4 (GER only)	Released: 13 May 2002; Label: ZYX; Formats: CD	—	—	—	—	—	—	—	
W (ITA only)	Released: 28 September 2012; Label: Off Limits; Formats: CD, digital download	—	—	—	—	—	—	—	
"—" denotes items that were not released in that country or failed to chart.

=== Compilation albums ===
Title	Album details
Mega Mixes	Released: 1995; Label: ZYX Music; Formats: CD
Eurodance (CAN only)	Released: 2001; Label: Popular Records; Formats: CD
Dance With Whigfield (GER only)	Released: 2004; Label: ZYX Music; Formats: CD
Waiting for Saturday Night (Her Greatest Hits) (GER only)	Released: 2004; Label: ZYX Music, Silver Star; Formats: CD
Greatest Remix Hits (AUS and Philippines only)	Released: 2006; Label: ToCo Australia, Dyna Music; Formats: CD
All in One	Released: 9 October 2007; Label: Off Limits; Formats: CD, digital download
Best Of (X-Mas Edition)	Released: December 2013; Label: X-Energy; Formats: digital download
Greatest Hits & Remixes	Released: September 2018; Label: ZYX Music; Formats: 2xCD, LP
Dance with Whigfield	Released: April 2022; Label: X-Energy; Formats: digital
The Hits Collection	Released: May 2022; Label: X-Energy; Formats: digital

=== Singles ===
Title	Year	Peak chart positions												Certifications	Album
Title	Year	ITA	AUS	AUT	BEL (FLA)	FRA	GER	IRE	NLD	SPA	SWE	SWI	UK	Certifications	Album
"Saturday Night"	1993	2	78	4	14	2	1	1	7	1	9	1	1	FRA: Silver; GER: Platinum; UK: 2× Platinum	Whigfield
"Another Day"	1994	3	—	—	32	24	12	5	32	6	39	9	7	UK: Silver	Whigfield
"Think of You"	1995	4	—	—	12	25	25	4	7	3	—	17	7		Whigfield
"Close to You"	1995	—	170	—	—	—	90	18	—	19	—	—	13		Whigfield
"Big Time"	1995	11	—	—	29	—	50	24	22	13	—	—	21		Whigfield
"Last Christmas"	1995	—	—	—	—	—	—	24	—	4	53	—	21		Whigfield
"Sexy Eyes"	1996	—	6	7	30	—	14	—	30	4	—	12	68	AUS: Platinum	Whigfield
"Gimme Gimme"	1996	—	14	—	—	—	—	—	—	4	—	—	—	AUS: Gold	Whigfield II
"No Tears to Cry"	1997	—	99	—	—	—	—	—	—	—	60	—	—		Whigfield II
"Baby Boy"	1997	—	123	—	—	—	—	—	—	—	—	—	—		Whigfield II
"Givin' All My Love"	1998	—	—	—	—	—	—	—	—	—	—	—	—		Whigfield II
"Be My Baby"	1999	—	184	—	—	—	—	—	—	—	—	—	—		Whigfield III
"Doo-Whop"	2000	—	—	—	—	—	—	—	—	—	—	—	—		Whigfield III
"Much More"	2000	—	—	—	—	—	—	—	—	—	—	—	—		Whigfield III
"Gotta Getcha"	2002	—	—	—	—	—	—	—	—	—	—	—	—		4
"Amazing and Beautiful"	2002	—	—	—	—	—	—	—	—	—	—	—	—		4
"Was a Time"	2004	—	—	—	—	—	74	—	—	—	—	—	—		Was a Time - The Album (reissue of 4)
"Right in the Night"	2008	—	—	—	—	—	—	—	—	—	—	—	—		All in One
"No Doubt"	2009	—	—	—	—	—	—	—	—	—	—	—	—		Non-album single
"C'est Cool"	2011	—	—	—	—	—	—	—	—	—	—	—	—		W
"4Ever"	2012	—	—	—	—	—	—	—	—	—	—	—	—		W
"Jeg kommer hjem"	2012	—	—	—	—	—	—	—	—	—	—	—	—		W
"How Long" (as Sannie)	2015	—	—	—	—	—	—	—	—	—	—	—	—		TBA
"In the Morning" (as Sannie)	2016	—	—	—	—	—	—	—	—	—	—	—	—		TBA
"Boys on Girls" (as Sannie)	2018	—	—	—	—	—	—	—	—	—	—	—	—		Dansk Melodi Grand Prix 2018
"Suga"	2020	—	—	—	—	—	—	—	—	—	—	—	—		TBA
"Megamix"	2022	—	—	—	—	—	—	—	—	—	—	—	—		TBA
"—" denotes items which were not released in that country or failed to chart.

=== Promotional singles ===
Title	Year	Peak chart positions		Album
Title	Year	DEN	GfK Entertainment	Album
"Don't Walk Away" (Scand only)	1995	—	—	Whigfield
"Junto A Ti" (MEX only)	1995	—	—	Whigfield
"I Want to Love" (CAN and Singapore only)	1996	—	—	Whigfield
"Saturday Night (2003 Version)"	2003	19	—	Non-album single
"Think of You (2007 Version)"	2007	—	—	All in One
"Saturday Night" (2013 Version) (featuring Carlprit)	2013	—	83	Non-album single
