= Whigfield II =

Studio album by Whigfield
- Released: 10 November 1997
- Recorded: 1996–97
- Studios: Off Limits Productions (Italy) and High Fashion Music (Netherlands)
- Genres: House, Euro disco, Italo disco
- Length: 53:52
- Labels: Vdisco (Portugal), Golden-Dance-Classics & ZYX Music (Germany), Orange (Scandinavia), Popron Music (Czech Republic), Record Express (Hungary), Paradoxx Music (Brazil), X-Energy (Italy), Transistor Music (Australia), Danza (Europe), Discos CNR Columbia (Colombia), Rock Co. Ltd. (Japan)
- Producers: Davide Riva, Larry A. Pignagnoli

Whigfield chronology
Whigfield (1995)	Whigfield II (1997)	Whigfield III (2000)

Professional ratings
Review scores
Source	Rating
Allmusic	3/5 stars

Whigfield II is the second studio album by Italian Eurodance project Whigfield which was performed by Danish-born Sannie Charlotte Carlson, released in November 1997.

Five singles were released from this record: "Gimme Gimme", Last Christmas, "No Tears to Cry", "Baby Boy" and "Givin' All My Love".

== Track list ==
1. Givin' All My Love 3:34
2. No Tears to Cry (Organ Mix) 3:47
3. Baby Boy (Original Radio) 3:39
4. Tenderly 4:01
5. What We've Done for Love 3:47
6. Lover 3:56
7. Gimme Gimme 3:23
8. Whiggy Whiggle 3:44
9. Forever on My Mind 4:03
10. Through the Night 3:54
11. Summer Samba 3:48
12. Saturday Night (Edit '97; remixed by M&M) 3:28
13. Last Christmas (Major Cut) 3:52
14. Mega Ricks Mix (Think of You/Another Day/Saturday Night/Sexy Eyes; mixed by Edwin & Richard Van 't Oost) 4:28
