= 4 (Whigfield album) =

Studio album by Whigfield
- Released: 13 May 2002
- Studio: Block Studios, Off Limits Recording Studios, Groove Studios (all Italy)
- Genre: Eurodance, Dance-Pop

Whigfield chronology
Whigfield III (2000)	4 (2002)	All in One (2007)

Professional ratings
Review scores
Source	Rating
AllMusic	3/5 stars

4 is the fourth studio album by Italian Eurodance project Whigfield which was performed by Danish-born Sannie Charlotte Carlson, released in May 2002.

The album was re-released in 2004 after the release of "Was a Time" in Germany and was called Was A Time – The Album. The album contains the single "Was a Time", as well as the tracks previously on 4. It also includes a bonus DVD which features music videos for some of the singles Whigfield has released. A DVD was also released with Was A Time – The Album as a bonus CD, the DVD is called Was A Time – The Essential Whigfield and features the same tracks and music videos as below.

== 4 track list ==
1. Gotta Getcha
2. Amazing & Beautiful
3. Beep Beep
4. Boys Boys Boys
5. Fantasy
6. Candy
7. I Knew Before
8. My Love's Gone
9. Get Get Get
10. Take Me to the Summertime
11. Outside Life
12. Welcome To Fun
13. My My
14. Every Single Day & Night
15. Tomorrow

== Was A Time – the album track list ==
1. Was A Time
2. Amazing & Beautiful
3. Beep Beep
4. Boys Boys Boys
5. Fantasy
6. Candy
7. I Knew Before
8. My Love's Gone
9. Get Get Get
10. Take Me to the Summertime
11. Outside Life
12. Welcome To Fun
13. My My
14. Every Single Day & Night
15. Tomorrow
16. Gotta Getcha

DVD

1. Was A Time
2. Saturday Night
3. Think of You
4. Sexy Eyes
5. Big Time
6. Close To You
7. Gimme Gimme
8. Baby Boy
9. No Tears To Cry
10. Givin' All My Love
11. Be My Baby
12. Last Christmas
13. Another Day
