= Orange Records =

British record label

Orange Records (self-identified as "ORANGE") is a British record label, founded in 1969 by Cliff Cooper. He had previously established Orange Amps in 1968, which gained recognition for its guitar amplifiers. Cooper was also owner of Orange Studios. In his studio prospective young artists produced demos, and the record company was born.

== History ==
Cooper's record label design initially used a "Voice of the World" logo with a stylish full-colour sleeve. The first band to be signed and recorded under the label were Growth, a psychedelic influenced blues rock band well known in London. They recorded a self titled album which was not released.

Orange signed a contract with a group called the Influence, which included John Miles. It was this group that provided Orange Records with its first release on 7 November 1969 titled "I Want To Live". The single didn't make the top ten, but it launched John's career.

At the same time, the label released a duo group called Contrast, featuring Roger and Christine Jeffrey. "Hey That's No Way To Say Goodbye" was their first single. Other releases from the early 1970s included "Ned Kelly" by Brian Chalker (1970) and "Candy Girl" by The Pal Brothers (1973).

Cooper negotiated pressing and distribution deals with other labels. In 1972 Billboard magazine reported on a new distribution agreement between Orange Records and the larger Pye Records label; "Orange, the label offshoot of the Orange recording studios, will release John Miles' 'Come Away MeLinda' [sic] as its first record through Pye."

In the early 1970s, Cooper changed the label's logo, opting for a black background with gold lettering. To promote the records Cooper engaged "Pluggers" to encourage airplay, and Cliff admits to being one of them. This gave him an insight in the record promotion and networking process, and he made a lot of good friends in the business. It was a tough business, though, and the promotion side was very expensive. Even now Cliff gets many requests to re-release those early records. Top DJ, Emperor Rosko still calls asking Cliff to bring out the entire Orange Records back catalogue.

== Some productions ==
Some of the releases from later years include BIG BAND JOHN/Tribute to the Rat Pack and TOM & CATHERINE – A True Love Story (1999), both featuring recordings from John Miles of different eras.
