= Saturday Night (Whigfield song) =

1992 single by Whigfield

- 1994 European CD single

Single by Whigfield

from the album Whigfield
- Released: 1992
- Studio: Labelle
- Genre: Europop; dance-pop
- Length: 4:04
- Label: Extreme
- Songwriters: Larry Pignagnoli; Davide Riva
- Producer: Larry Pignagnoli

Whigfield singles chronology
"Saturday Night" (1992)	"Another Day" (1994)

Music video
- "Saturday Night" on YouTube

Alternate cover
- 1994 German CD single

"Saturday Night" is a song by Italian Eurodance project Whigfield, fronted by Danish-born Sannie Charlotte Carlson. It was first released in 1992 in Italy, followed by a Spanish release in 1993. Throughout 1994, it was released across the rest of Europe and experienced worldwide success. The song was written by Italian producers Larry Pignagnoli and Davide Riva and produced by Pignagnoli. In 1995, the song was included on Whigfield's debut album, Whigfield.

The single entered at number one on the UK Singles Chart, making Whigfield the first artist to enter at the top in the UK with their debut single, dethroning Wet Wet Wet's 15-week chart-topper "Love Is All Around". As of October 2015, "Saturday Night" has sold a total of 1.18 million copies in the UK. It also reached number one in Germany, Ireland, Peru, Spain and Switzerland, and it became a top-10 hit in Austria, Denmark, France, Greece, Iceland, Italy, the Netherlands, Norway and Sweden. In Spain the single spent 11 weeks at the top position. Outside Europe, it peaked at number three in Zimbabwe, number 19 on the US Billboard Dance Club Play chart and number 78 in Australia. Its accompanying music video was filmed in London by La La Land, featuring Whigfield standing in front of a mirror, getting ready to go out on Saturday night.

NME magazine ranked "Saturday Night" at number 15 in their list of the 50 best songs of 1994. It was also nominated for Best Single, while Whigfield was nominated for Best New Act on the 7th annual Smash Hits Awards in 1995. In 2023, it ranked as the 93rd best-selling singles of all time on the Official UK Chart.

== Background and composition ==
Whigfield (AKA Sannie Charlotte Carlson) studied fashion design in Copenhagen and went to Bologna in Italy where she worked as a model by day and as a PR girl for clubs at night. One of the club DJs, Davide Riva, was part of a music production duo. He persuaded her to work for them. She then visited Italian producer Larry Pignagnoli in his studio, he hired her to perform "Saturday Night" and they chose the name Whigfield. Larry Pignagnoli already had success with Spagna in the late 1980s and early 1990s before he produced "Saturday Night" with Whigfield. With lyrics written by Pignagnoli in three days, the duo did over 20 takes, then they spliced the best bits together.

Reviews categorized "Saturday Night" as a melodic bubblegum-influenced pop-dance and Euro-pop track. James Hamilton from the Record Mirror Dance Update compared it to "Do Wah Diddy Diddy". "Saturday Night" includes a rave-tinted rhythm section, and a house piano at its fade-out. According to Whigfield, "Saturday Night" is "like a nursery rhyme, with lyrics about what girls do when they're getting ready to go out, and about getting hot when they’re out dancing." The "Dee dee na na na" was initially done as a joke, before they incorporated it as an initial hook. They chose to release the song for its simple, upbeat and club-ready nature, titling it "Saturday Night" to reflect that. The lyrical subject led Simon Cowell to compare it to Rebecca Black's "Friday", stating that they are "what we call a 'hair-dryer song'; a song girls sing into their hair dryers as they're getting ready to go out".

== Release and commercial performance ==
Initially, no record companies were interested in publishing "Saturday Night". After it was played frequently in the Spanish radio show World Dance Music, interest in the song began to increase. The first label to pick up the song was a small label, Prodisc in Valencia. It was first released in Italy in 1992, then became a number-one hit in Spain at the end of 1993. In the summer of 1994, it became a hit with British holidaymakers on the continent, leading to a huge demand for the track in the United Kingdom. Whigfield was signed for the UK in February 1994 by Christian Tattersfield and Ben Kahn who run London offshoot Systematic. The label decided to delay the release in order to capitalise on the inevitable buzz built up among British tourists returning from summer holidays in mainland Europe. The single was not released in North America until February 1995.

"Saturday Night" was released in the UK on 5 September 1994, and went straight to number one - dethroning Wet Wet Wet's 15 week chart-topper "Love Is All Around" on 11 September, despite that single increasing its sales from 65,000 the previous week to 104,000, when "Saturday Night" entered at number one with sales of 150,000. Whigfield was the first act to enter at number one in the United Kingdom chart with her debut single. It stayed at number one for a total of four weeks selling 680,000 in the process, went on to become the second best selling single of the year, and has sold a total of 1.18 million copies. "Saturday Night" is also the 15th biggest-selling single by a female artist in the United Kingdom. It also was a No. 1 hit in Germany, Ireland, Spain and Switzerland, and a No. 2 hit in Denmark, France, Iceland, Italy and Norway. In Spain, the single spent a total of 11 weeks at number-one. Additionally, it reached the top 10 also in Austria (4), Greece (9), the Netherlands (7) and Sweden (9), while it was a top-20 hit in Belgian Flanders (14). Outside Europe, it peaked at number-one in Peru and on the RPM Dance/Urban chart in Canada, No. 3 in Israel and Zimbabwe, No. 4 in Mexico, No. 19 on the Billboard Dance Club Play chart in the United States and No. 78 in Australia.

Sannie Charlotte Carlson of Whigfield told Music Week in December 1994 of the song's unexpected success, "An important day for me was when the BBC called me up and said I was number one here [in the UK], 15 minutes before I was about to do a gig, which was very strange. I didn't understand what was going on and I didn't expect it, as you have so many terrific groups getting nowhere."

== Critical reception ==
"Saturday Night" was well-received by professional critics, both contemporaneous and retrospective pieces labeling the track as "irresistible", "catchy", and "infectious". Larry Flick from Billboard magazine wrote that it "is a giddy pop/dance ditty that has already saturated radio airwaves throughout Europe. It also has gotten early spins on crossover stations in Los Angeles, Chicago, and Nashville—and rightly so. The tune has a simple, but killer hook that is matched by a jumpy, rave-coated rhythm section and chirpy female vocals." Another Billboard editor, Mark Dezzani, named it a "teen anthem". Chris Heath from The Daily Telegraph felt it's "pleasantly annoying", saying, "It's pop music. Don't be too cool to enjoy it." David Balls from Digital Spy noted its "feelgood Euro beats and memorable dance routine".

Tom Ewing of Freaky Trigger complimented it for being "one of those iconically simple pop hits" and for its "resistibility". He also added that the song is "charmingly unassuming, thanks mainly to Whigfield's matter-of-fact performance. If you do stick around, your reward is a lovely bit of house piano heading for the fade. But this song is never pushy. It's Saturday night. Whigfield is having a great time." A reviewer from Music Week called it "delightful frothy pop", and Stephen Meade from The Network Forty considered it as "exciting". NME named "Saturday Night" a "much misunderstood dancefloor classic", while Gavin Hills from The Observer praised it as "wonderful". Sylvia Patterson from Smash Hits was less enthustiastic, writing, "Quack quack! goes some "instrument" before someone starts doing the Euro chopsticks on the piano and we're whipped into a lather of squeaky-voiced dum-de-dum-de-dum! lyrical nonsense..."

== Music video ==
The official music video for "Saturday Night" was directed by British production company La La Land and filmed in London. It features numerous different scenes of Whigfield standing in front of a mirror, with a blue backdrop, getting ready to go out on Saturday night. She blow-dries her wet hair, before she braids it and puts on make-up. In some scenes, she flips through pictures of different men and selects one of them, which she kisses and attaches to the mirror. Whigfield told in a 2009 interview, "That guy is actually the director of the video, and the photo was taken on holiday in Ibiza. I'm not sure what he was doing full of mud as he was, as I wasn't there myself." In the video for her next single, "Another Day", the same image appears, this time in a frame. Other scenes in "Saturday Night" also show the singer trying to decide which clothes to wear, before she goes for a black singlet. The video was A-listed on German music television channel VIVA in September 1994. It also was a Box Top on British The Box the next month and received active rotation on MTV Europe in November 1994. Two months later, "Saturday Night" was A-listed on France's MCM, in January 1995.

== Associated dance routine ==
There is a dance routine which is commonly performed to the song (particularly at parties and nightclubs in the United Kingdom), the origins of which are uncertain. Some suggest that it began as an aerobic routine created by a gym instructor to accompany the song at a holiday resort, and followed the song back to the UK. The dance does not appear in the music video for the song, however it was performed by backing dancers during Whigfield's performance on Top of the Pops on 15 September 1994. The routine consists of five distinct motions performed in a loop throughout the song, each motion carried out over eight beats.

These moves are: (a) palms downwards, hands in front of the waist, motioning rightwards or downwards over the right leg twice, then over the left leg twice; (b) pointing the right forearm vertically up and twirling the index finger while resting the elbow on the palm of the left hand, and then swapping hands; (c) rolling the wrists over each other while leaning over slightly; (d) placing hands on hips, stepping forward left foot then right then stepping back again left foot then right; (e) hopping forward with feet together and then back, then forward again while turning 90 degrees to the right, then hopping forward (in new direction) with feet together and back again, then clapping the hands. Because of the quarter-turn rotation, dancers turn fully around about a dozen times during the song.

Whigfield stated in an interview with Justin Myers for the Official Charts Company, "I remember I did some promotion in this place north of Madrid and when I was doing the track [I] saw everybody doing this thing and they all jumped at the same time. I hadn’t even known about the dance until then... I still remember the dance, but I didn’t do it. I thought it was kind of nice that it was just the people doing it."

== Allegations of plagiarism ==
Two claims of plagiarism were made. It was alleged that the track ripped off both "Rub a Dub Dub" by the Equals and "Fog on the Tyne" by Lindisfarne. Both claims were dismissed.

== Impact and legacy ==
The Guardian ranked "Saturday Night" number 91 in their list of "The 100 Greatest UK No. 1s" in 2020. NME ranked it number 15 in their list of the "50 Best Songs of 1994". Smash Hits nominated the song and act in the categories for Best New Single and Best New Act on the 7th annual Smash Hits Awards in 1995. British music critic Mark Frith named "Saturday Night" his favourite record of 1994, saying, "I just think it's a brilliant state-of-the-art pop dance single, it wound a lot of people up and I just remember the excitement when it was released, the predictions of where it was going into the charts and seeing the video for the first time as a prediction on Top of the Pops, and just thinking it was completely brilliant all round." In 2012, NME ranked it number 22 in their list of "50 Best-Selling Tracks of the '90s", calling it "violently catchy" and noting that it had sold 1,092,000 units. The song was played in the British TV series Everything I Know About Love (2022–present). In 2023, "Saturday Night" ranked as the 93rd best-selling singles of all time on the Official UK Chart.

== Track listings ==
- CD single – UK [SYSCD3]
1. "Saturday Night" (radio mix)
2. "Saturday Night" (extended nite mix)
3. "Saturday Night" (nite mix)
4. "Saturday Night" (beagle mix)
5. "Saturday Night" (dida mix)
6. "Saturday Night" (deep nite mix)
7. "Saturday Night" (trance beat mix)
- CD single – Australia (1997)
1. "Saturday Night" (radio mix) – 4:06
2. "Saturday Night" (Nite Mix) – 5:29
3. "Saturday Night" (Extended Nite Mix) – 5:54
4. "Saturday Night" (classic vocal remix - US remix) – 9:15
5. "Mega Pix Mix" 4:28
- CD maxi – Remixes
1. "Saturday Night" (trance beat remix) – 4:44
2. "Saturday Night" (afternoon) – 4:40
3. "Saturday Night" (deep night remix) – 5:45
4. "Saturday Night" (extended nite remix) – 5:55
5. "Saturday Night" (radio mix) – 4:07
- CD US maxi-single
1. "Saturday Night" (Remix) – 5:55
2. "Saturday Night" (Deep Nite Mix) – 5:45
3. "Saturday Night" (Beagle Mix) – 4:55
4. "Saturday Night" (Classic Vocal Mix - remixed by Darrin Friedman & Hex Hector) – 9:15
5. "Saturday Night" (Spike Vocal Mix - remixed by Darrin Friedman & Hex Hector) – 7:28
6. "Saturday Night" (Dida Mix) – 4:36

== Charts ==
=== Weekly charts ===
Weekly chart performance for "Saturday Night"
Chart (1993–1997)	Peak position
Australia (ARIA)	78
Austria (Ö3 Austria Top 40)	4
Belgium (Ultratop 50 Flanders)	14
Canada Retail Singles (The Record)	11
Canada Top Singles (RPM)	31
Canada Dance/Urban (RPM)	1
Denmark (IFPI)	2
Europe (Eurochart Hot 100)	1
Europe (European Dance Radio)	1
Europe (European Hit Radio)	12
France (SNEP)	2
Germany (GfK)	1
Greece (Pop + Rock)	9
Iceland (Íslenski Listinn Topp 40)	2
Ireland (IRMA)	1
Italy (Musica e dischi)	2
Mexico (Notitas Musicales)	4
Netherlands (Dutch Top 40)	7
Netherlands (Single Top 100)	17
Norway (VG-lista)	2
Peru (UPI)	1
Quebec (ADISQ)	6
Scotland (OCC)	1
Spain (AFYVE)	1
Sweden (Sverigetopplistan)	9
Switzerland (Schweizer Hitparade)	1
UK Singles (Official Charts)	1
UK Dance (OCC)	2
UK Airplay (Music Week)	5
UK Dance (Music Week)	2
UK Club Chart (Music Week)	12
US Dance Club Play (Billboard)	19
US Maxi-Singles Sales (Billboard)	46
Zimbabwe (ZIMA)	3

=== Year-end charts ===
1994 year-end chart performance for "Saturday Night"
Chart (1994)	Position
Canada Dance/Urban (RPM)	23
Europe (Eurochart Hot 100)	8
Europe (European Dance Radio)	20
France (SNEP)	30
Germany (Media Control)	16
Iceland (Íslenski Listinn Topp 40)	28
Netherlands (Dutch Top 40)	37
Sweden (Topplistan)	91
Switzerland (Schweizer Hitparade)	23
UK Singles (OCC)	2

1995 year-end chart performance for "Saturday Night"
Chart (1995)	Position
Canada Dance/Urban (RPM)	44
Europe (Eurochart Hot 100)	79
France (SNEP)	52
Norway Winter Period (VG-lista)	19

== Certifications ==
Certifications for "Saturday Night"
Region	Certification	Certified units/sales
France (SNEP)	Gold	250,000^{*}
Germany (BVMI)	Platinum	500,000^{^}
Norway (IFPI Norway)	Gold	
Spain (Promusicae)	Platinum	60,000^{‡}
United Kingdom (BPI)	2× Platinum	1,180,000
^{*} Sales figures based on certification alone.^{^} Shipments figures based on certification alone.^{‡} Sales+streaming figures based on certification alone.

== Release history ==
Release dates and formats for "Saturday Night"
Region	Date	Format(s)	Label(s)	Ref.
Italy	1992	12-inch vinyl	Extreme	
Spain	29 November 1993	7-inch vinyl; 12-inch vinyl	Prodisc	
Germany	24 January 1994	CD	ZYX Music	
United Kingdom	5 September 1994	7-inch vinyl; 12-inch vinyl; CD; cassette	Systematic	
Australia	31 October 1994	CD; cassette	Systematic; Polydor	
Japan	21 January 1995	CD	Avex Trax	
