= Alfredo Pignagnoli =

Italian record producer (born 1951)

Alfredo "Larry" Pignagnoli (born 31 July 1951) is an Italian record producer, composer and musician.

He is behind several international dance hits and he runs the production unit "Off Limits" in Italy.

== Career ==
=== Early career ===
Starting from the 1960s, Pignagnoli took part to different bands, both as singer and musician, performing live in the Italian clubs and festivals. He was band member of Le Sfingi (beat music genre), I Marines and Gli Scorpioni. Then he met Ivana Spagna and together they founded the Van Larry band. One year after, Giorgio "Theo" Spagna (brother of Ivana) joined the band and they became the Opera Madre group. Ivana Spagna in her book "Quasi Una Confessione" wrote a section about that period.

In the 80's Pignagnoli and Ivana & Giorgio Spagna opened their own music studio and began to create some jingles for the TV advertisings as well as composing and producing the first success.

=== Career as composer ===
Called "one of the pop maestros of Italy" by Dino Stewart (managing director at BMG Rights Management Italy) on The Music Network, Pignagnoli began his career as composer writing tracks "Colour My Love" and "Happy Station" for the Fun Fun project. Then he composed many dance hits like "Call Me" and "Easy Lady" by Spagna as well as Whigfield tracks "Saturday Night", "Sexy Eyes", "Another Day", "Close To You" and "Think Of You". In 1994 "Saturday Night" went straight to number one in the UK single chart and this allowed Whigfield to enter in the Guinness World Records as she was the first non-UK act to enter at number one in the United Kingdom chart with a debut single.

In the 90's Pignagnoli composed also J.K. tracks "You Make Me Feel Good" and "You & I" and "2 Times" by Ann Lee.

He was recently credited as co-writer of "Rely On Me" by multiplatinum djs Sigala, Gabry Ponte & Alex Gaudino, "Las Babys" by Aitana and "Clap Your Hands" by Kungs. "Clap Your Hands" got the platinum status in Italy and France (FIMI chart and SNEP) and peak at #19 in the French Single Chart.

=== Career as producer ===
While "Saturday Night" was exploding all over the world, Pignagnoli opened the Off Limits studios in Reggio Emilia, Italy where he focused on the production side, collaborating and helping grow new artists like Benny Benassi, Whigfield, In-Grid, Annerley Gordon (aka Ann Lee), J.K., Benassi Bros, Dhany, Sandy Chambers, Power Francers and producers Alessandro Benassi, Riccardo Marchi, Davide Riva and Marco Soncini.

Between the end of the 90's and the beginning of the 2000s, Pignagnoli collected many successes as producer.

In 1993 he knew Annerley Gordon (co-author of "The Rhythm of The Night" by Corona) and -together with Davide Riva- they composed many hit tracks for the J.K., Whigfield and Dhany projects. It was not until 1999 a new song emerged written by Pignagnoli and Gordon. In fact, at the end of the 90's, they put all their talents (Pignagnolis as composer and producer, Gordon as singer and composer as well) in the track "2 Times". Success suddenly came and this allowed Annerley Gordon (known as Ann Lee) to perform in Europe, Russia, Australia, New Zealand and South America.

In the same period, Pignagnoli and Marco Soncini (co-producer and co-writer of "2 Times" already) were also looking for a singer and an author to write the lyrics on a new unpublished song with an accordion's refrain. Thus "Tu es Foutu" by In-Grid was born, a song that became an international hit with 14 platinum and gold records achieved and which allows In-Grid to bring her talent on the stages all over the world, from Mexico to Siberia.

Some months after, thanks to the success of "Satisfaction" (produced by Larry Pignagnoli and composed by Alle Benassi), Benny Benassi started djing in the most important festivals and clubs in all the five continents and Benny himself was mentioned as one of the Worlds Greatest DJ by Forbes. Alle and Benny's collaboration with Pignagnoli continued in the Hypnotica and Rock 'n' Rave albums, including the remix of Public Enemy's "Bring the Noise" -that allowed the Benassi cousins to win the Grammy Award for Best Remixed Recording at the 50th Grammy Awards- and in the Benassi Bros project (in the Pumphonia and ...Phobia albums as well as all the singles extracted from them). In the Benassi Bros project the "Benassi sound" was made more pop adding melody and lyrics performed mainly by Dhany and Sandy Chambers. The project went well in Europe and Russia (gold discs in France and double platinum discs in Russia), with high positions in the singles charts for the tracks taken from the Benassi Bros albums.

In the mid-2000s Pignagnoli produced the track "Put Them Up (Put 'em up)" by Edun. In 2005 Edun, scouted when she won a contest called by Benny Benassi for his project "Who's knockin'?" with Ferry Corsten (so F.B.), recorded "Put Them Up (Put 'em up)" a song that became a US dance anthem, peaking at number 2 in the Billboard Hot Dance Airplay chart.

In 2010 Pignagnoli has begun his collaboration with Riccardo Marchi and Power Francers in "Pompo nelle casse". The song became a hit in Italy, reaching the gold disc status, while the video got over 14 million views on YouTube.

=== Present career ===
Pignagnoli has recently opened his own publishing and management company Pignagnolis Srl, focused on the music producers' professional growth.

He still runs Off Limits' company, working on the artists' management and neighbouring rights collection.
