= Ann Lee (singer) =

- Born: Annerley Emma Gordon
- Genre: Eurodance
- Occupations: Singer, songwriter, dancer
- Instrument: Vocals
- Years active: 1990–present
- Label: DWA
- Website: annerleymusic.com

Annerley Emma Gordon most known professionally as Ann Lee, is a British Eurodance singer and songwriter, who rose to fame in the late 1990s. She is known primarily for her hit singles "2 Times" (1998) and "Voices" (1999).

== Career ==
Having moved to live in Italy in the late 1980s, Gordon released a few Eurobeat solo singles on the Italian label A-Beat-C, under her real name Annerley, and Annalise. Gordon is credited with contributing to the composition of "The Rhythm of the Night", released in Italy in December 1993 on the DWA record label, by Eurodance project Corona.

Gordon's first solo single under the name Ann Lee was "2 Times", originally released in 1998. It was re-released in early 1999 and became a top-10 hit in Austria, France, Germany, Italy, Netherlands and Norway, as well as in Australia and New Zealand. It also hit no. 2 in her native United Kingdom, and reached no. 1 in Flanders and Denmark. In Canada it reached no. 14 on the singles chart. "2 Times" was featured in the 2001 film Head Over Heels as the movie's theme song.

Lee's second solo single was "Voices", released in 1999: it fared considerably less well, but was a Top 10 hit in the Czech Republic, Denmark and Spain, and reached the Top 30 in the United Kingdom.

2007 saw the return of Lee with the album So Alive, which included the single "Catches Your Love". In 2009, she released another single, "2 People", under the Off Limits label. In December of that year, Lee provided the vocals for Favretto's single "I Get The Feeling", also released by Off Limits.

== Personal life ==
Lee bought a house in Italy in 2005, and had a son born the same year.

== Discography ==
=== Albums ===
List of albums, with selected details
Title	Details
Dreams	Released: 1999
So Alive	Released: 2007
Reflections	Released: 2024

=== Singles ===
Title	Year	Peak chart positions											Certifications	Album
Title	Year	ITA	AUS	AUT	BEL (Fl)	CAN	FRA	GER	NED	SPA	SWE	UK	Certifications	Album
"2 Times"	1998	5	4	3	1	14	9	5	4	13	14	2	AUS: Platinum; AUT: Gold; BEL: Platinum; FRA: Gold; GER: Gold; UK: Gold	Dreams
"Voices"	1999	—	131	18	13	—	57	53	55	6	—	27		Dreams
"Ring My Bell"	2000	—	160	—	—	—	61	—	—	17	—	—		Dreams
"So Deep"	2001	—	—	—	—	—	—	—	—	—	—	—		Dreams
"No No No"	2003	—	—	—	—	—	—	—	—	—	—	—		Singles only
"2 Times 2007"	2007	—	—	—	—	—	—	—	—	—	—	—		So Alive
"2 People"	2009	—	—	—	—	—	—	—	—	—	—	—		
"—" denotes a title that did not chart, or was not released in that territory.
