= Monky (artist) =

Peruvian graphic artist (born 1962)

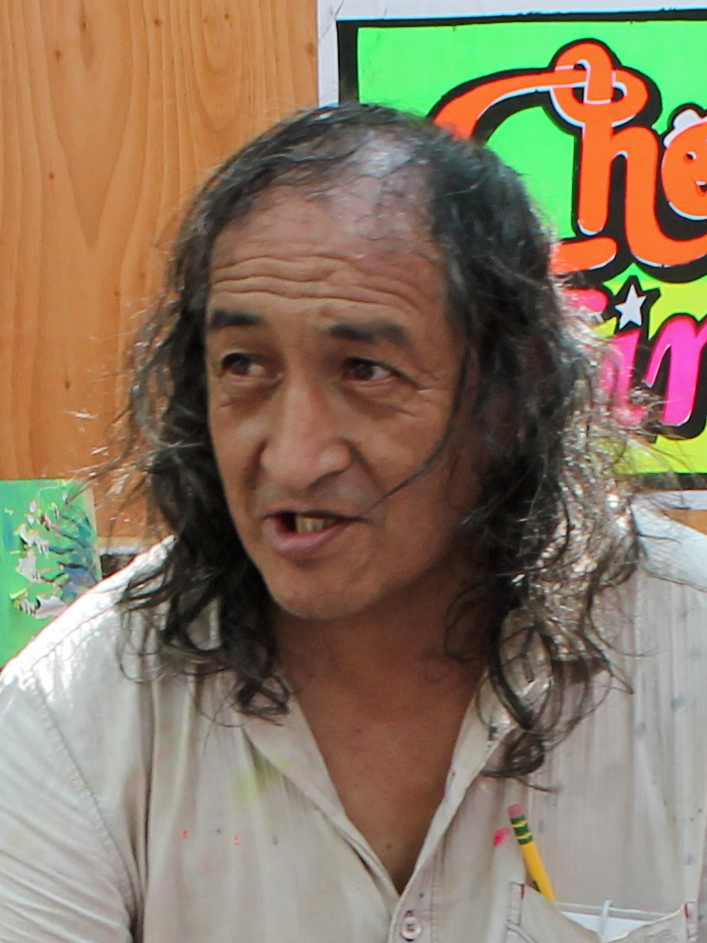
- Monky in 2015
- Born: Pedro Tolomeo Rojas Meza; 1962 (age 63–64); San Lorenzo, Jauja, Peru
- Known for: Graphic design; poster art
- Movement: Chicha

Monky (born Pedro Tolomeo Rojas Meza, 1962 and also referred to as Pedro Tolodeo) is a self-taught Peruvian graphic artist and pioneer of the chicha poster movement. His street posters, printed in bright fluorescent inks and pasted on walls across Lima, are associated with the chicha music genre. His visual style, developed during the 1970s and 1980s using hand-drawn lettering and screen printing, defined the chicha poster aesthetic.

== Early life and education ==
Monky was born in 1962 in San Lorenzo, a district in Jauja in the Junín Region to a farming family. His early design work was in a single color only. He moved to Lima in 1980 with the intention of studying to become a mechanic, and worked as a mechanic, waiter, combi fare collector, cook, and day laborer.

== Career ==
In Lima, he continued to develop his design practice, creating murals, flyers, and various forms of advertising. In 1978, he created his first posters using stencils and spray paint. In 1983, Monky began working with poster maker Juan Tenicela, creating serigraphs using burned mesh screens and clothing dyes.

After a year of working with Tenicela, Monky established his own workshop. His first major clients were chicha musicians Chacalón and Tongo, who hired him to create posters for their concerts. His work subsequently began to spread throughout Peru.

Monky also makes large stage banners, painting directly onto the cloth itself instead of using an intermediate paper. Despite the introduction of laser-printing technology that enables printing large-scale work and has largely replaced manual creation in the industry, Monky creates his work by hand.

He has created posters, album covers, and logos for prominent chicha musicians, including Alegría, Celeste, Chacalón, Los Destellos, Génesis, Karicia, Los Pakines, Pintura Roja, Los Shapis, Tongo, and Los Walkers.

As of 2024, Monky continues to create posters to promote cumbia concerts, and is supported by his nephew in his Lima studio to meet international demand.

== Artistic style and technique ==
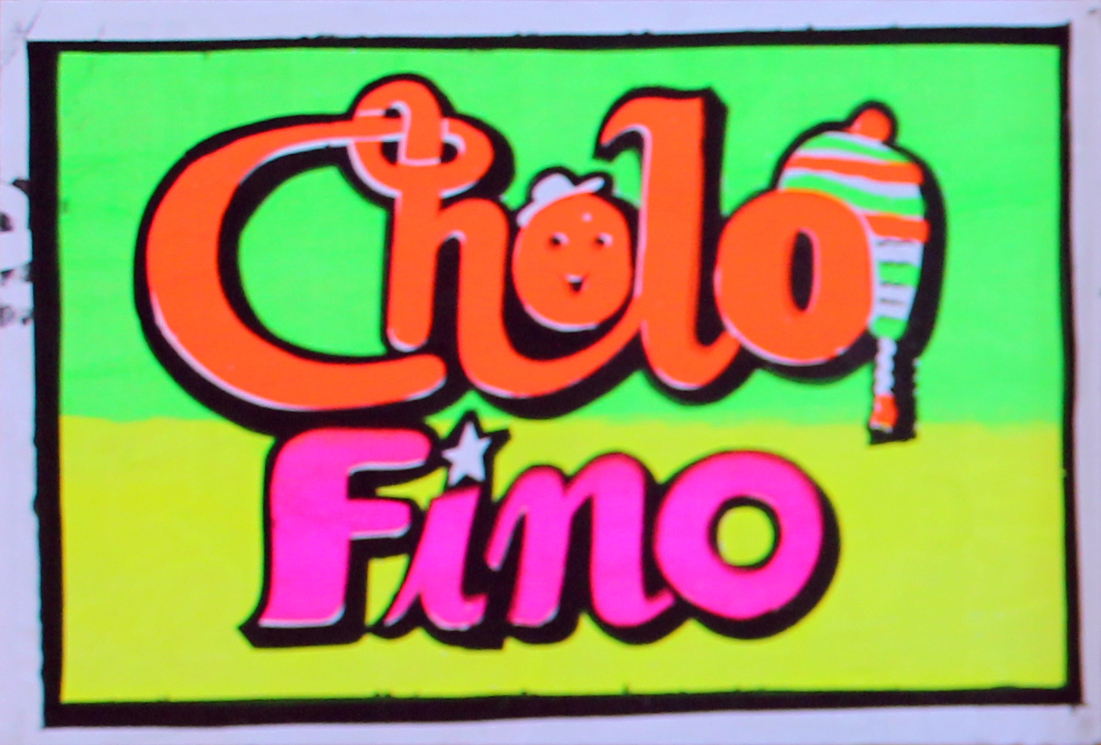
A sign by Monky that reads "Cholo Fino" ("Classy Cholo")

Monky's art is influenced by the landscapes, sculpture, and costumes of the Huancayo region, including the 20 January festival in his hometown, particularly the colorful costumes of chonguinos dancers and traditional clothing. His grandmother dyed clothing with fluorescent pigments in the late 1960s, which she called "colores escandalosos" ("scandalous colors").

Monky's early work used a color palette of blue, red, yellow, and orange against a black background. In the late 1980s, Monky discovered fluorescent pigments in latex form at a hardware store and had the Diamanti company prepare fluorescent pigments specifically for serigraphy. His technique involves hand drawing, stenciling according to color, and serial printing of 100 copies per mesh screen. He works freehand without using models or computers.

== Impact ==
His work has influenced artists such as Nación Chicha, Feliciano Mallqui, Ruta Mare, Carga Máxima, and Elliot Túpac.

Monky noted that his work is more appreciated outside Peru than within, stating, "in other countries we have love and support; they let us do the work we do on the walls."

== Recognition and awards ==
- In 2013, Monky was featured in the exhibition "A mí qué chicha" at the Centro Cultural de España in Mexico City, at the invitation of fellow chicha artist Elliot Túpac. Monky won the mural contest.
- In 2014, a poster he designed for the second "A mí qué chicha" exhibition in Mar del Plata, Argentina won first prize.
- In 2015, Monky was invited to participate in the Smithsonian Folklife Festival on the National Mall in Washington, D.C., where he demonstrated his silk-screening techniques, gave daily free workshops, and spoke with visitors.
- In 2020, Monky's work was featured in "Revolución Chicha: Street Art & Graphics of Perú," an exhibition at Lesley University in Cambridge, Massachusetts.
- In 2021, the Universidad Peruana de Ciencias Aplicadas (UPC) presented a virtual exhibition of his work.
- In 2025, his work was featured prominently in the exhibition "Neón Chicha" at the Museo del Grabado ICPNA, which included an installation called "Monkylandia" displaying his posters created from 2013 onwards.
