= Elliot Túpac =

Peruvian muralist and lettering artist

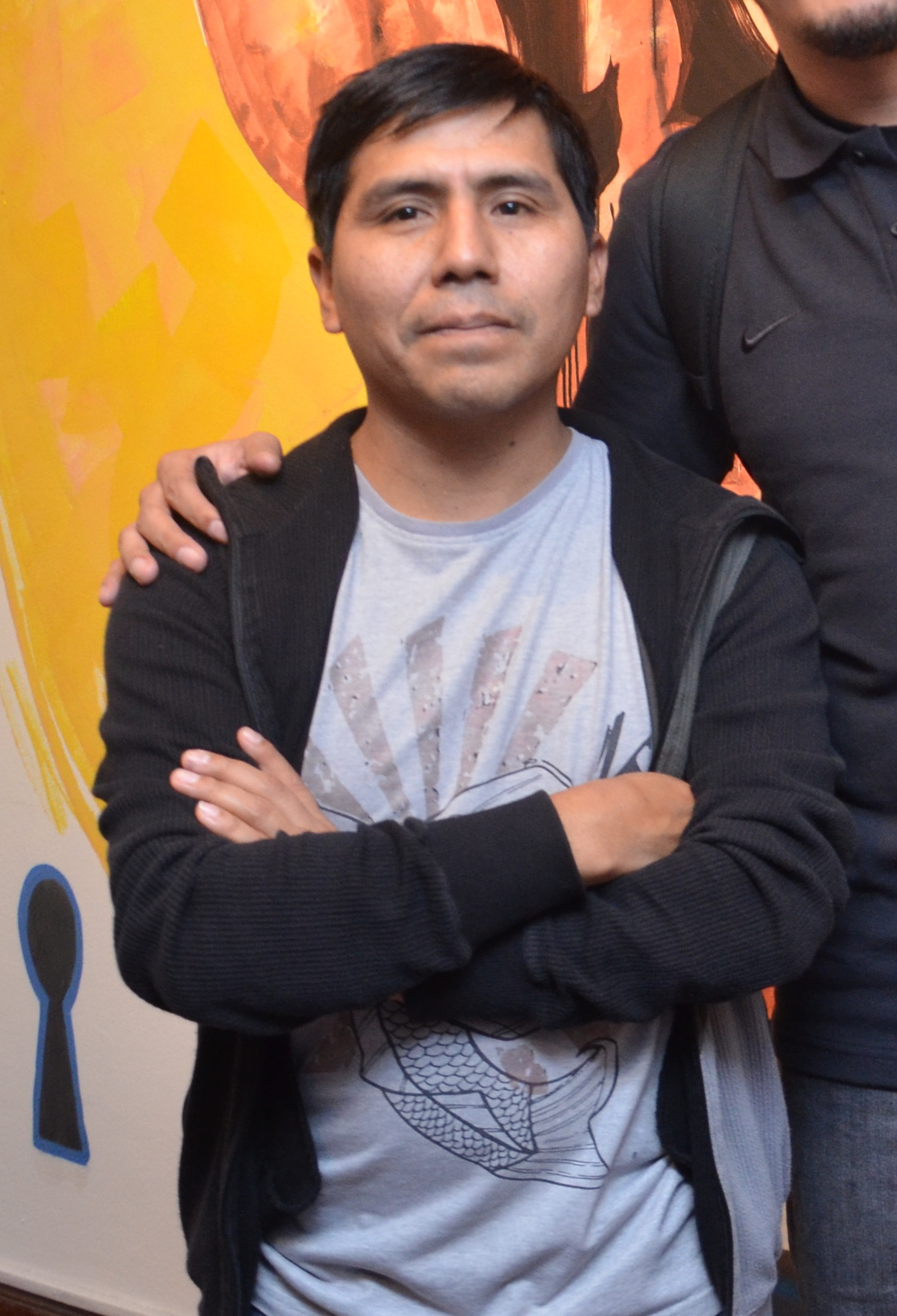
- Born: Elliot Urcuhuaranga Cárdenas; 1978 or 1979 (age 47–48); Huancayo, Peru
- Known for: Chicha posters; murals; lettering
- Website: elliottupac.com

Elliot Túpac is a Peruvian muralist, lettering artist, and screen printer. He is credited with reviving the chicha poster, the fluorescent silkscreened advertising for chicha music concerts, and elevating it from the street into art galleries.

== Early life ==
Túpac was born in Huancayo, in Peru's Mantaro Valley, and settled in Lima. His mother was an artisan of Wanka embroidery, and his father, Fortunato Urcuhuaranga, made silkscreened concert posters in the 1980s for such chicha musicians as Chacalón, Pascualillo, Los Shapis, and Rey Vico, and taught his son printing processes. Túpac began making posters himself at about age 11, and fellow chicha artist Monky was his mentor. He studied communications.

== Career ==
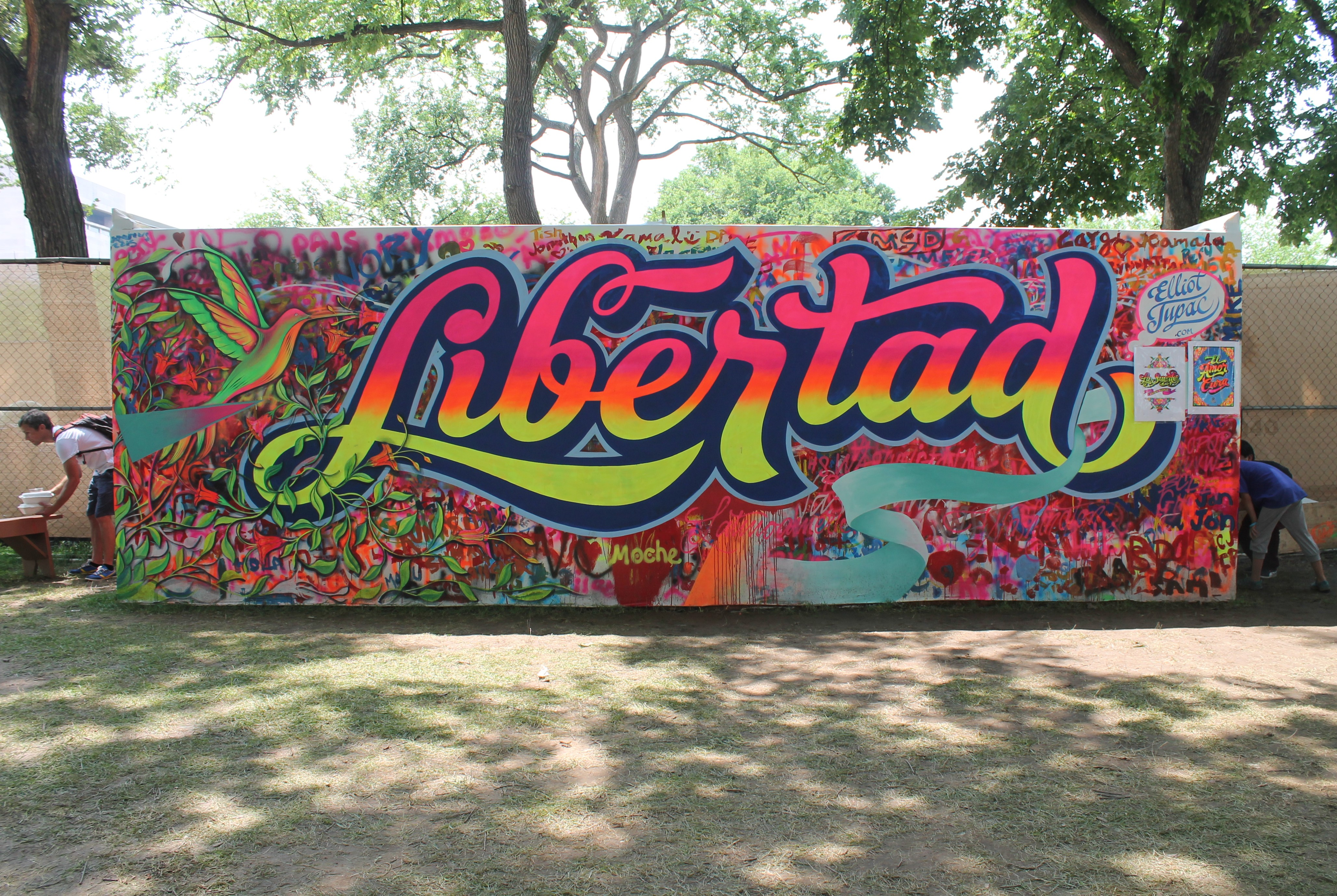
Túpac's "Libertad" mural at the Smithsonian Folklife Festival in Washington, D.C., 2015

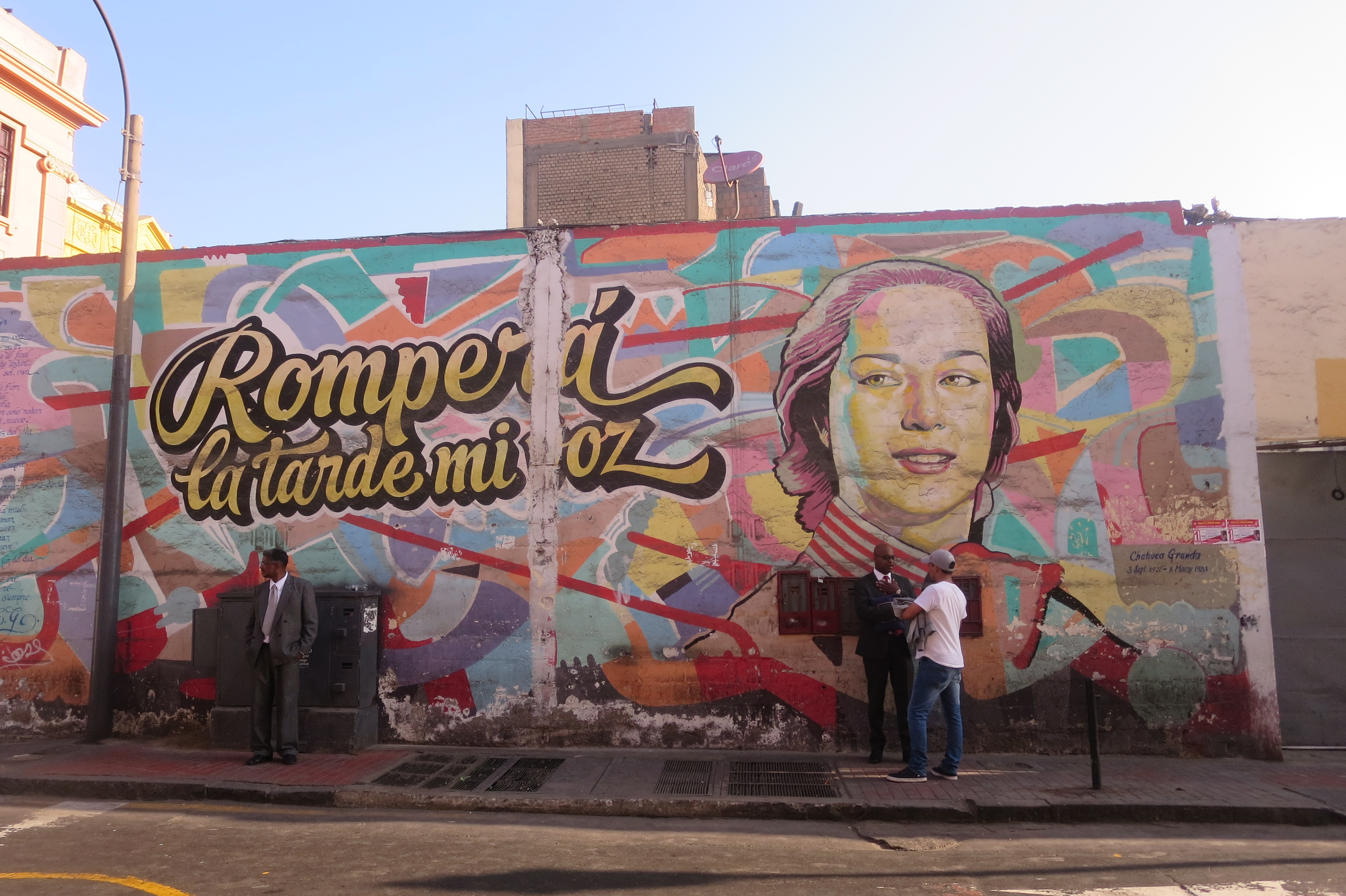
Portrait of Chabuca Granda in Lima, painted with Decertor in 2015

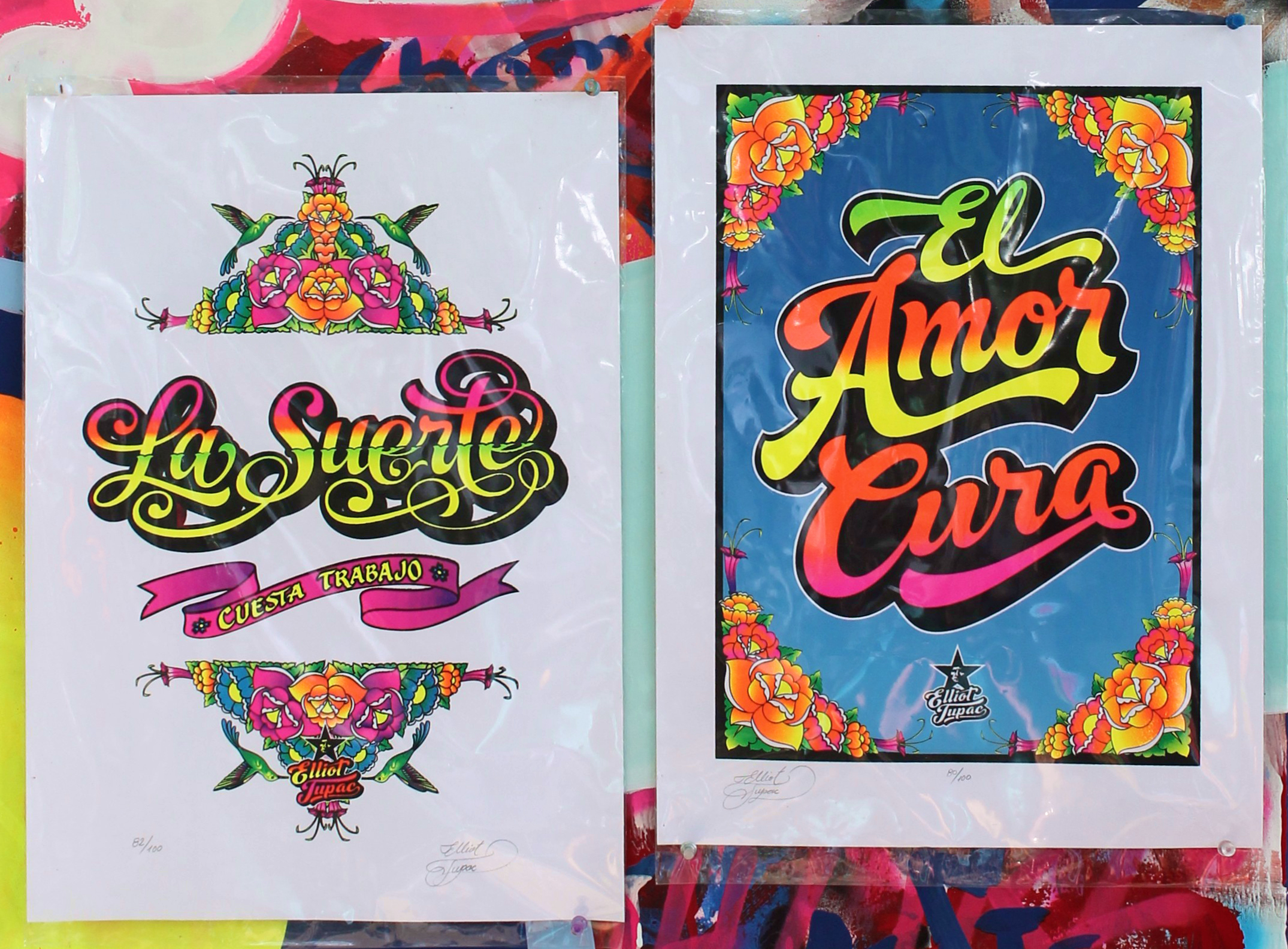
Screen prints La Suerte Cuesta Trabajo ('Luck Takes Work') and El Amor Cura ('Love Heals'), shown at the Folklife Festival, 2015

He works in hand-drawn lettering and screen printing. His style of letterforms is similar to the embroidery of the Mantaro Valley. Túpac has painted murals in Peru and internationally, including in Chile, England, Tunisia, and the United States, and has taught and lectured abroad. He has produced commercial design work for brands including BBVA, Cristal, Dunkin' Donuts, Marca Perú, Movistar, Puma, and Saga Falabella. He also did design work for the films Madeinusa (2006) and La teta asustada (2009).

Selected works
| Date | Title of work | Location | Details | Ref. |
|---|---|---|---|---|
| January 2010 | N/A | UK | Creative Review magazine cover | |
| 2012 | Equilibrio | Providencia, Santiago, Chile | Mural for the urban intervention festival Hecho en Casa | |
| 2013 | N/A | Santiago, Chile | Official poster for Chilean Lollapalooza | |
| 2015 | Citizen of the World | Newcastle upon Tyne, England | Mural for the tenth ¡Vamos! festival of Latin American culture | |
| 2015 | Portrait of Chabuca Granda | Lima, Peru | Collaboration with the muralist Decertor | |
| 2017 | N/A | Online | Google Doodle of an Andean hummingbird and Machu Picchu for Peru's independence day | |
| November 2020 | Memoria | Aldo Chamochumbi coliseum, Magdalena del Mar, Peru | Mural with Decertor depicting Inti Sotelo and Bryan Pintado, killed during the November 2020 protests | |
| N/A | Sembrar Amor | Recoleta, Santiago, Chile | Collaboration with Ignar Haze and Ecos on the role of visual messaging in public space | |

== Critical reception ==
In 2013, El Comercio wrote that Túpac's work embodies "the maturation of a historical and cultural process begun with South American rural-to-urban migration, one that overcame the prejudice and arrogance of the salons and galleries until it was recognized by the most demanding critics". (Note: The quote in its original Spanish is: "la maduración de un proceso histórico y cultural iniciado con la migración campo-ciudad sudamericana, que ha vencido los prejuicios y la soberbia de los salones y las galerías hasta ser reconocido por la crítica más exigente.") In 2015, the UK publication The Guardian wrote that Túpac's classic chicha style as a sign writer had earned him international recognition. In his 2021 study of chicha aesthetics, Peruvian sociologist Arturo Quispe Lázaro credited Túpac with initiating the revival of chicha style, both in creating a new form of chicha expression and reviving the chicha poster.

== Selected exhibitions and collections ==
- 2010: Chile Chicha, Galería 13, Santiago, Chile, his first gallery exhibition
- 2012: Letra Capital, Pancho Fierro art gallery, Lima, solo exhibition curated by César Ramos; his first exhibition in Peru, and the first show of chicha posters in a Lima art gallery
- 2015: Vibraciones, Pepe Cobo gallery, Barranco, Lima
- 2019: Exhibition at the gallery of Institut d'études supérieures des arts, Paris, as invited artist of a two-week program of Peruvian culture in France
- 2019: Revolución Chicha, Lunder Arts Center, Lesley University, Cambridge, Massachusetts, group exhibition of Peruvian chicha art curated by Andrew Mroczek
- 2024: Contemporáneo 1, MAC Lima, long-term exhibition of the museum's permanent collection
- 2024: 20th-anniversary exhibitions, Galería ÍNDIGO, San Isidro, new collection and live mural
- 2026: Somos Libres. Volumen 2, Ministry of Culture, Lima, group exhibition curated by Martín Yépez
