= Chicha (disambiguation) =

Chicha is a type of beverage of Latin America.

Chicha may also refer to:

- Chicha (art), a Peruvian Kitsch aesthetic
- Chicha (film), a 1991 Soviet comedy film
- Chicha, Pakistan, a village of Faisalabad District in the Punjab province, Pakistan
- Chicha Amatayakul (born 1993), a Thai actress, singer and model
- An Andean tropical music genre at the origin of Peruvian cumbia
- A fictional female character featured in the Disney franchise The Emperor's New Groove
