= LA LOM =

American instrumental band

Los Angeles League of Musicians
- Origin: Los Angeles, California, U.S.
- Genres: Instrumental rock
- Years active: 2018–present
- Label: Verve Records
- Members: Zac Sokolow; Jake Faulkner; Nicholas Baker
- Website: thelalom.com

The Los Angeles League of Musicians, often abbreviated as LA LOM, is an American instrumental band originating from Los Angeles, California. The band consists of guitarist Zac Sokolow, bassist Jake Faulkner, and percussionist Nicholas Baker. The trio began playing together at the Hollywood Roosevelt Hotel, where they experimented with a mix of distinct genres, including cumbia and Peruvian chicha. Building on this foundation, the band has been noted for its fusion of multiple different styles.

== History ==
The Los Angeles natives Zac Sokolow and Jake Faulkner met each other as teenagers and later began performing together in the lobby of the Hollywood Roosevelt Hotel in 2018, covering classic pop and soul songs from artists such as Aretha Franklin and Roy Orbison. Nicholas Baker, also a native of Los Angeles and a friend of Faulkner, later joined the band; his introduction of congas led to LA LOM adopting a higher-tempo, Latin-inspired sound, incorporating genres such as cumbia and bolero. The band's three-hour sets, played five days a week, became a fixture at the hotel. In 2021, they released their debut EP and began to upload their performances online. The band's covers and original songs have received millions of views on social media. LA LOM eventually stopped playing solely at the hotel and started to perform at bars and nightclubs around the Los Angeles area.

Covers of cumbia and chicha bands form a large part of their discography; Sokolow cited bands such as Los Mirlos and Los Shapis as influences for their music. Their discography also contains numerous original tracks; many of them have titles that pay homage to specific locations in Los Angeles, such as Santee Alley and Figueroa Street. Sokolow described their music as an attempt to capture a "nostalgic feeling" of 1950s- and 1960s-era Los Angeles. Following an April 2024 concert, the KCMP radio host Bill DeVille praised the band's style, which he described as a "blend of surf rock, cumbia sonidera, country twang and Peruvian chicha music." Tyler Fox of The Pitch additionally praised LA LOM's "unique pastiche of musical influences and styles". The band's members have cited their Latin heritage and childhoods, when they were exposed to genres like tango and bolero, as inspiring their inclusion of Latin themes in their music.

=== The Los Angeles League of Musicians (2024) ===
On 9 August 2024, LA LOM released its first album, The Los Angeles League of Musicians. The album was released through Verve Records, which signed the band in June 2024. The band recorded the album with the intent of expanding on their live performances, including through the incorporation of instruments like the piano and organ. The album was produced by the Wild Belle member Elliot Bergman and mostly recorded on Figueroa Street in Los Angeles. The band toured with Vampire Weekend in support of the album. It debuted at number five on Billboard's Tropical Albums chart, making it the third album to debut in the top five in 2024. It also reached number 18 on the Emerging Artists chart and number 44 on the Top Current Album Sales chart. The album was generally well-received by critics; Mary Siroky of Consequence called the album "excellent" and a "stellar listen". Additionally, Eric Schuman of WXPN labelled it "confident and instantly likeable".

== Discography ==
=== Studio albums ===
- The Los Angeles League of Musicians (2024, Verve Records)

=== EPs ===
- LA LOM (2021)

=== Singles ===
- "Juana la Cubana" (2023)
- "Maravilla" / "Lucia" (2023)
- "Angels Point" / "Figueroa" (2023)
- "Llorar" (2023)
- "Alma Florecida" (2024, with Gaby Moreno)
- "Danza de LA LOM" (2024)
- "San Fernando Rose" (2024)
