= Chicha (art) =

1980s Peruvian kitsch aesthetic

Chicha art
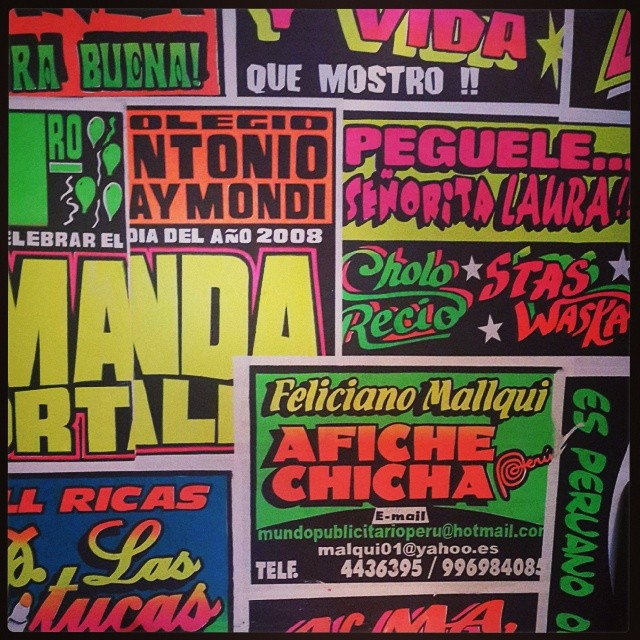
- Chicha art posters
- Years active: 1980s–present
- Location: Peru
- Major figures: Monky; Elliot Túpac; Yefferson Huamán
- Influences: Andean culture; Chicha; Psychedelic rock

Chicha art refers to a Peruvian kitsch aesthetic that emerged in the 1980s. It has been described as a contemporary baroque art.

The movement emerged alongside Chicha music and the mass migration from Peru's Andean highlands and central forest to coastal cities. Created as promotional posters for cumbia concerts using hand-drawn screen printing techniques, the style is characterized by phosphorescent and fluorescent colors, contrasting tones against black backgrounds.

Chicha art gained recognition in the late 2010s as a new generation of artists embraced their cultural heritage, including the children of immigrants.

== History ==
The origins of chicha art begin in the 1960s and 1970s, with migration across Peru's regions: from the Andean highlands and central forest to the coastal capitals, particularly Lima.

Initially dismissed as a minor artistic form, chicha art was viewed through a racist lens as huachafa and inferior. In the late 2010s, a new generation, many of them children of immigrants who now form part of the middle class, revalued Cholo and Chicha culture. This shift appeared in both music, with groups like Dengue Dengue Dengue! and Bareto, and in graphic art, with artists such as Monky, Elliot Túpac, and Yefferson Huamán gaining recognition, some internationally. Collectives including Familia Gutiérrez, Amapolay, Unidos por un Sueño, Nación Chicha, and Carga Máxima emerged, and the number of workshops in Lima and other Peruvian cities grew.

Chicha art also serves as social protest, appearing in murals and demonstration posters addressing issues such as defense of the Peruvian jungle, femicide, and LGBT rights. The style has spread to areas with Peruvian immigration, including Chile.

== Characteristics ==
Chicha posters are created by hand using screen printing with mesh. The style uses phosphorescent colors and contrasting tones against black backgrounds, which help posters stand out in the urban environment of neighborhoods, shanty towns, and poorly lit areas.

The color palette draws from Andean culture, particularly the Huanca Nation, as seen in garments for traditional dances. The sinuous typography has been associated with psychedelic rock from the 1960s.

Other characteristics include horror vacui and advertising phrases that blend poetic, idiomatic, and Peruvian Spanish elements.

== Gallery ==
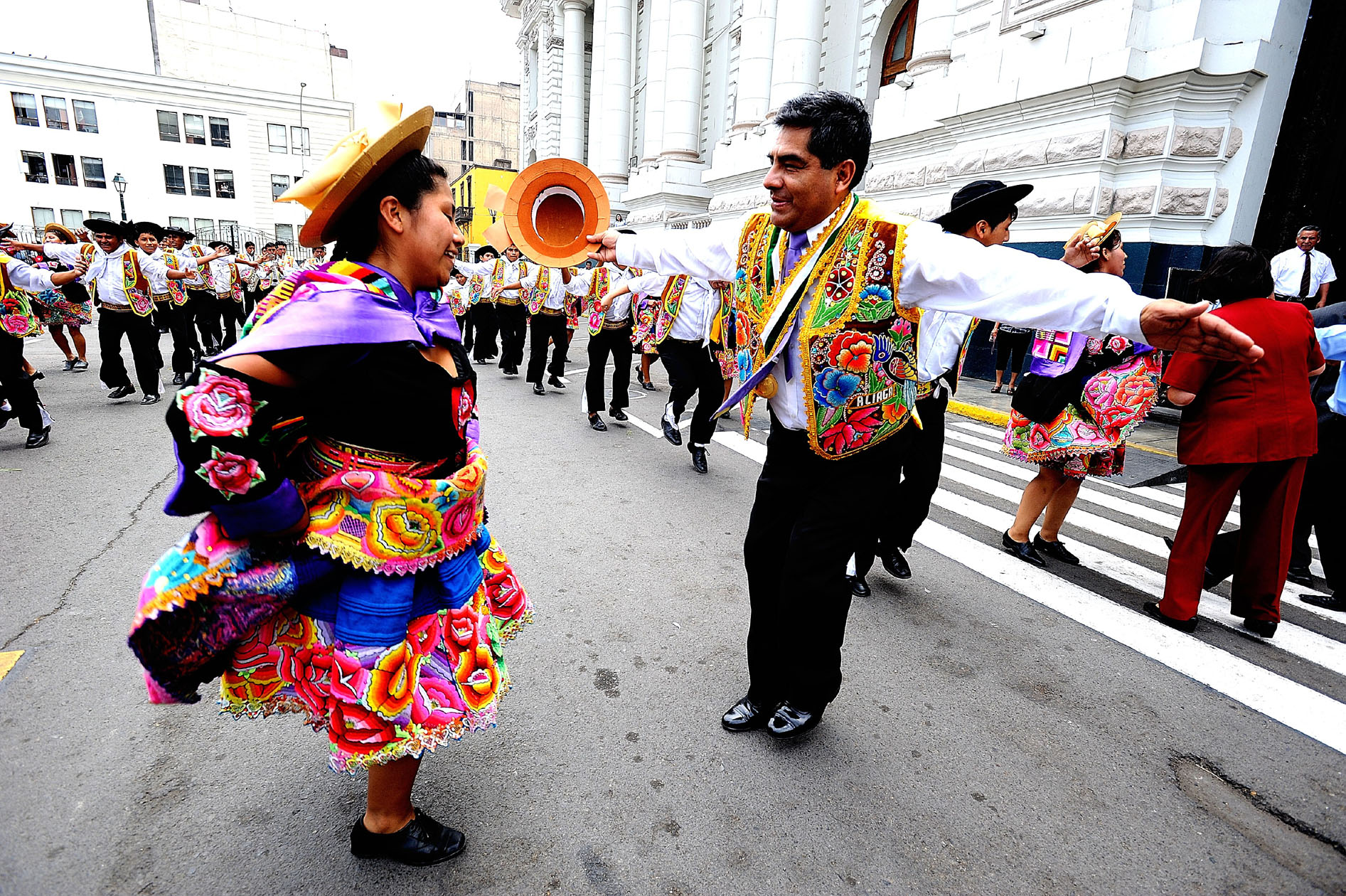
Strident colors of the outfits of the huaylarsh, a typical dance of the huanca carnival

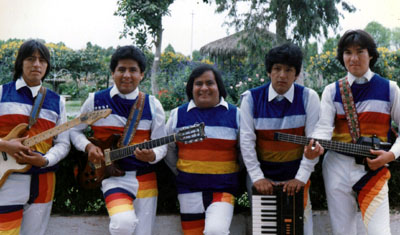
Los Shapis, a huancaíno Chicha music group that gave visibility to fluorescent art

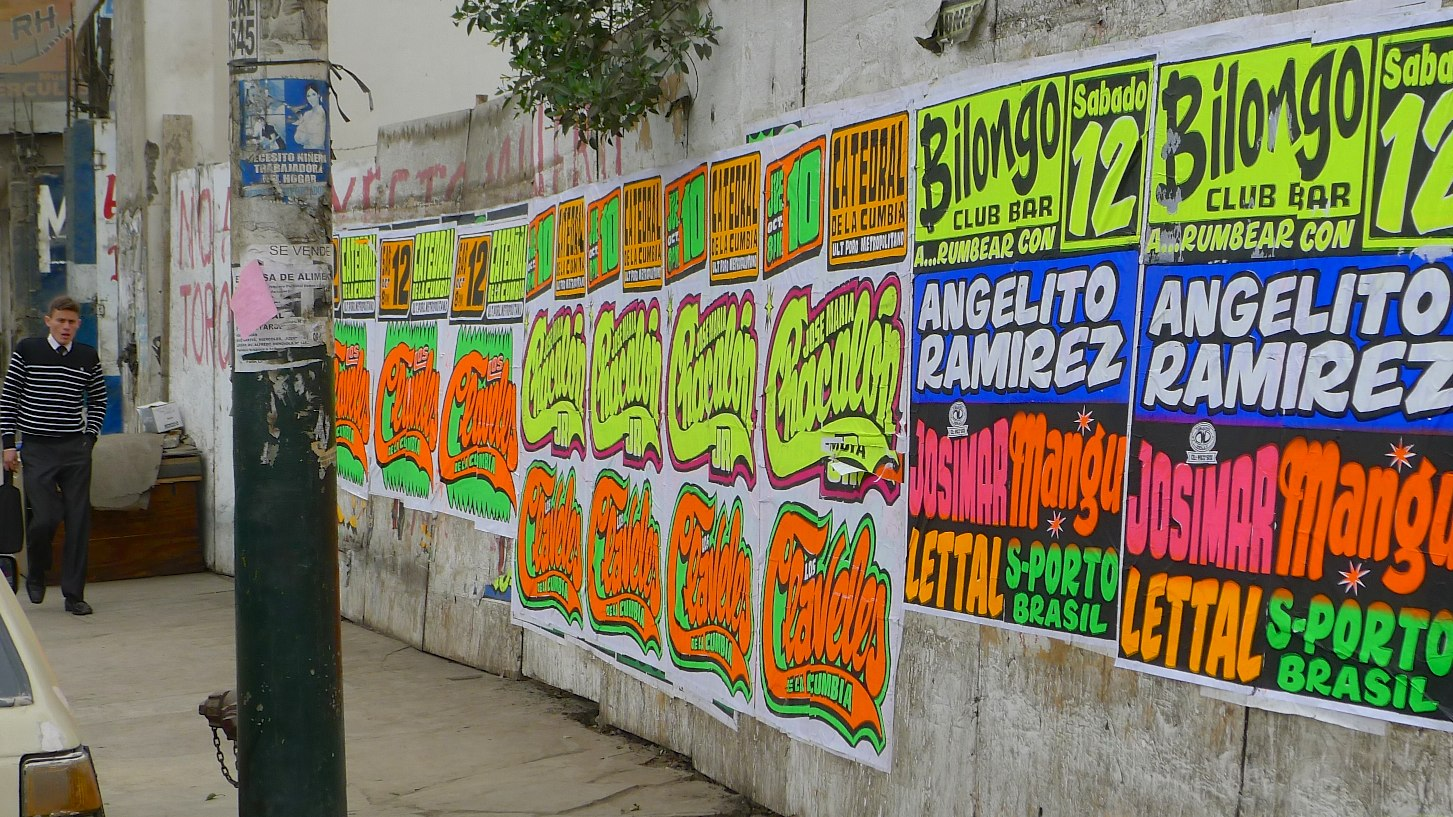
Chicha posters on a wall in the Lima district of Comas

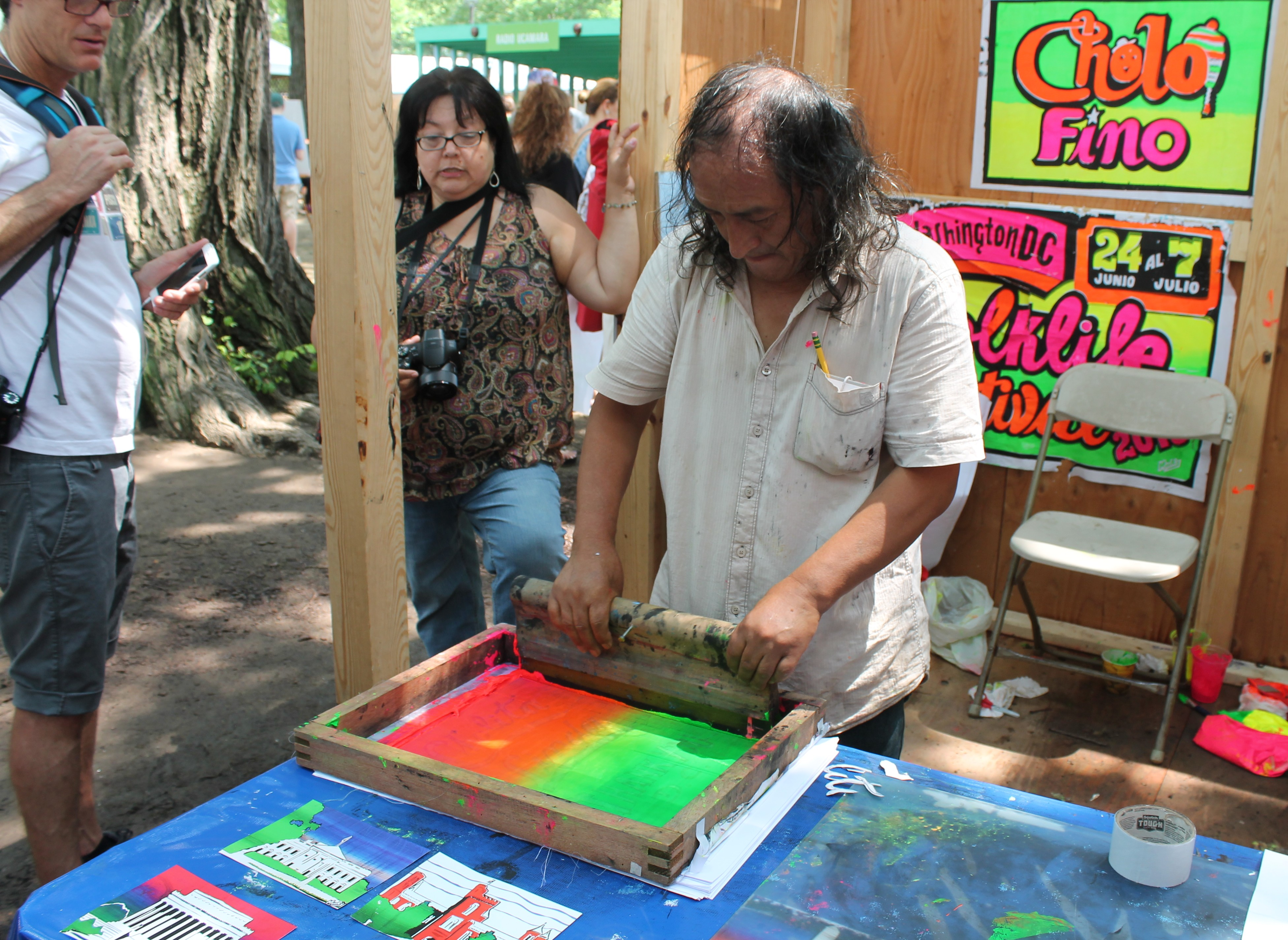
The Peruvian poster artist Monky, at the Smithsonian Folklife Festival 2015 in Washington, D.C.

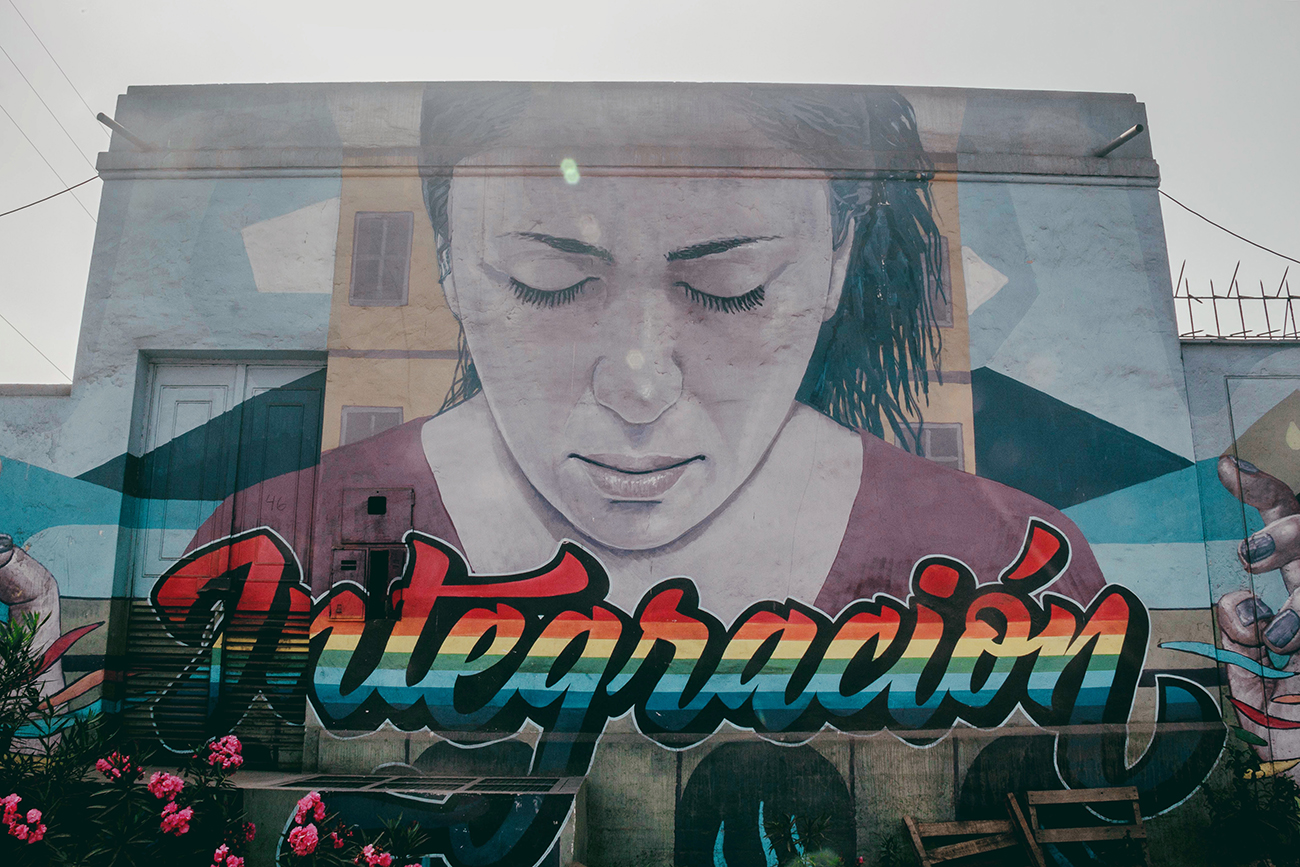
Mural Integración by Elliot Túpac in Lima
