= Bareto =

Music group from Peru

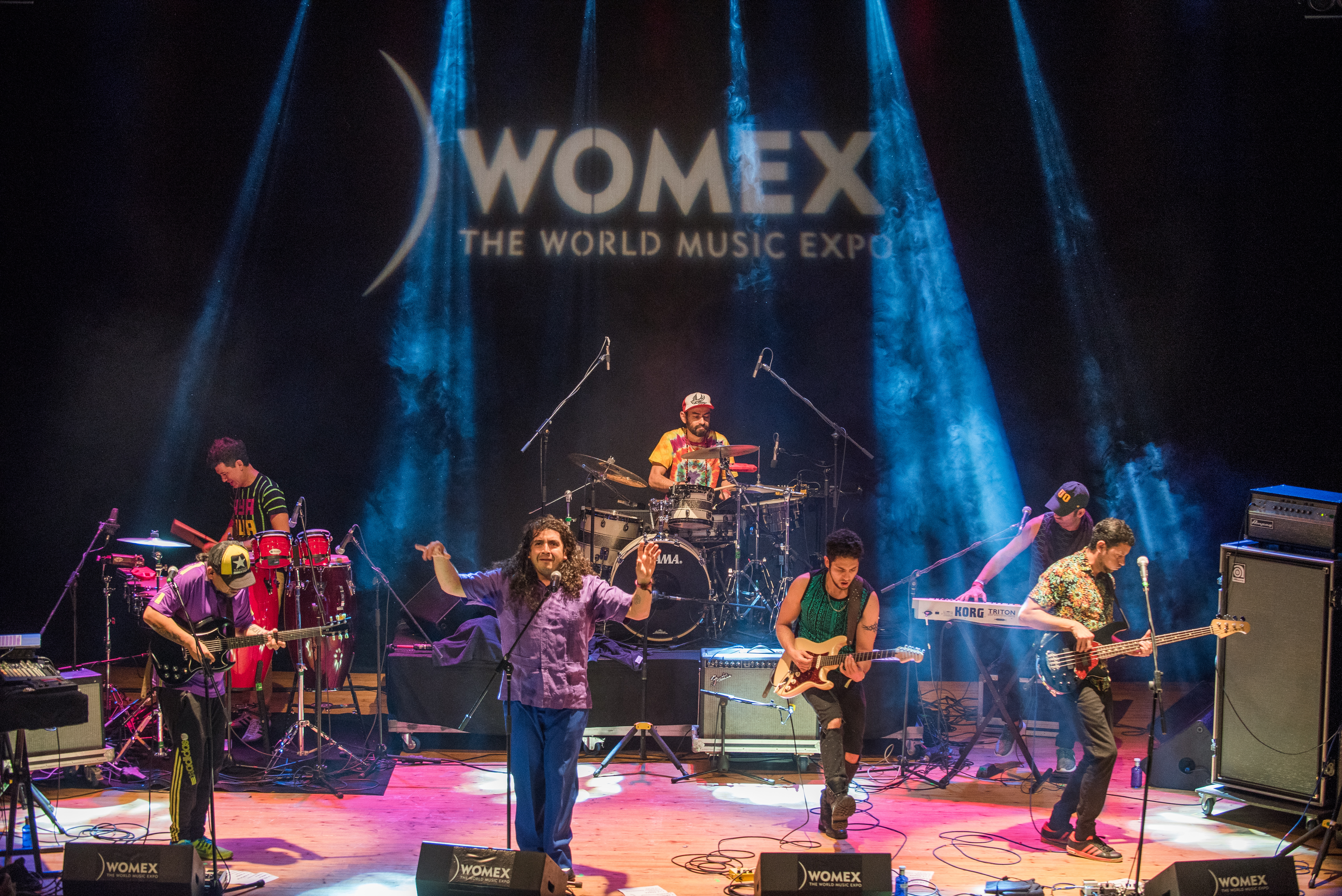
Bareto live at Womex 2016, Santiago de Compostela, Spain

Bareto is a music group from Peru, known for making their own versions of classic Peruvian cumbia songs.

They play and record their own material and had been nominated for the Latin Grammy Awards for their self-penned albums "Ves lo que quieres ver" (2012) and "Impredecible" (2015).

The band’s musical explorations began with Jamaican ska and reggae, but quickly, and not giving up that original influence, Bareto then focused in Amazonian Cumbia and its psychedelic universe. Soon the experiment took shape in the studio album “Cumbia”, released in 2008, which pushed Bareto to national success, a peak never reached before by a band from the alternative circuit.

The band’s next step forward led them to become a confirmed reference of contemporary music in Perú, in which Bareto spreads went around the world during various tours. The last of the tours consisted of a month-long trip connecting 7 concerts in Canada (with their debut at the prestigious Montréal International Jazz Festival) and 12 dates among Europe, including Portugal, Spain, France, Austria, Sweden, Estonia and their first ever concert in Russia.

== Beginnings (2003-2005) ==
The group was formed in 2003, following the tradition of 70’s Peruvian groups like Black Sugar and Los Belkings.

In 2005, they released the EP “Ombligo”: 5 songs recorded live of which only 500 copies were made. It featured 3 original songs as a four-piece (Ombligo, Bambam, and Tarantino) and two covers, Cantaloop Island (Herbie Hancock) and Marcus Gravey (Burning Spear). These last two were recorded live including a wind section for the first time.

1. Ombligo (Joaquín Mariátegui)
2. Tarantino (Joaquín Mariátegui)
3. Bam Bam (Joaquin Mariategui)
4. Cantaloop Island (Herbie Hancock)
5. Marcus Garvey (Burning Spear)

== Boleto (2006-2007) ==
In 2006, they released their debut album, Boleto, where the band mixed reggae and ska punk with Latin beats, including Cumbia, in songs like "La Calor" and their version of "La del Brazo" (originally by Peruvian rock group Fragil). The album was recorded at Iempsa Studios by Tato del Campo. It features nine original songs that combine reggae, ska punk and funk, with tropical and Latin moods. The album included percussion and a wind section.

1. "La fuga de Túnez"
2. "Bam Bam"
3. "Kincha"
4. "Bebop Marley"
5. "La del brazo"
6. "La calor"
7. "Boleto"
8. "Ombligo"
9. "Tarantino"
10. "Choque y fuga"

== Cumbia (2008) ==
In September 2008, and taking advantage of the newfound respect for typical Peruvian Cumbia, Bareto release their sophomore album “Cumbia”, composed entirely by Peruvian Cumbia and popular Latin songs. The album gave the band a strong commercial push, with versions of popular Amazonia and Andean cumbia from Juaneco y Su Combo, Los Mirlos, and Los Shapis. The album also features Wilindoro Cacique on vocals.

“Cumbia” reached the gold record status for its sales in just 3 months after it was released.

1. Vacilando con ayahuasca
2. Ya se ha muerto mi abuelo
3. Mujer hilandera
4. A la fiesta de San Juan
5. Soy provinciano
6. El aguajal
7. Caballo viejo
8. El Brujo (Fachín)
9. Un shipibo en España
10. Llorando se fue
11. La danza de los mirlos

== Sodoma y Gamarra (2009) ==
By the end of 2009, Bareto released Sodoma y Gamarra, an album which has the band searching for new sounds, fusing Peruvian sounds with world music. The song “No juegue con el diablo” was part of the soundtrack for the soap opera “Los Exitosos Gomes”. The song “La Distancia” features Dina Paucar.

1. Pa' todos hay
2. No juegue con el diablo (single)
3. La distancia
4. Ceja de selva
5. El Chui Chui
6. Sodoma y Gamarra

== Ves lo que quieres ver (2012) ==
In 2012, Bareto released their album, “ves lo que quieres ver”. The first single is called “Camaleon”.

The new album also marks the bands transition into the international market and was backed by tours in Japan, United States and Brazil.

The group also shared the stage in 2012 with highly successful Manu Chao, former Mano Negra, in his show in Peru.

== Impredecible (2015) ==
With Bareto’s last long effort, Impredecible, released in November 2015, the band reached further international reach thanks to the English label World Village (Harmonia Mundi).

The tracks “La voz del Sinchi”, “Viejita guarachera” and “La semilla” has been aired in radios in France as Nova and Fip. Bareto did not stick to influence of Peruvian Psychedelic Cumbia in their latest album, which takes us from instrumental cumbia with “La Voz del Sinchi,” to a deep dub atmosphere in “Viejita Guarachera” passing by festejo with the song “El Loco”. The Afro Peruvian singer, Susana Baca, featured on the last track.

The album has also been the opportunity for the band to include electronic elements thanks to the support in production of Felipe Álvarez (Polen Records, Colombia).
