= Cumbia norteña =

Cumbia norteña may refer to a subgenre of:

- Mexican cumbia (Cumbia norteña mexicana)
- Argentine cumbia
- Peruvian cumbia (Cumbia norteña peruana)
