= Smithsonian Folklife Festival =

Festival hosted by the Smithsonian on the National Mall in Washington, D.C.

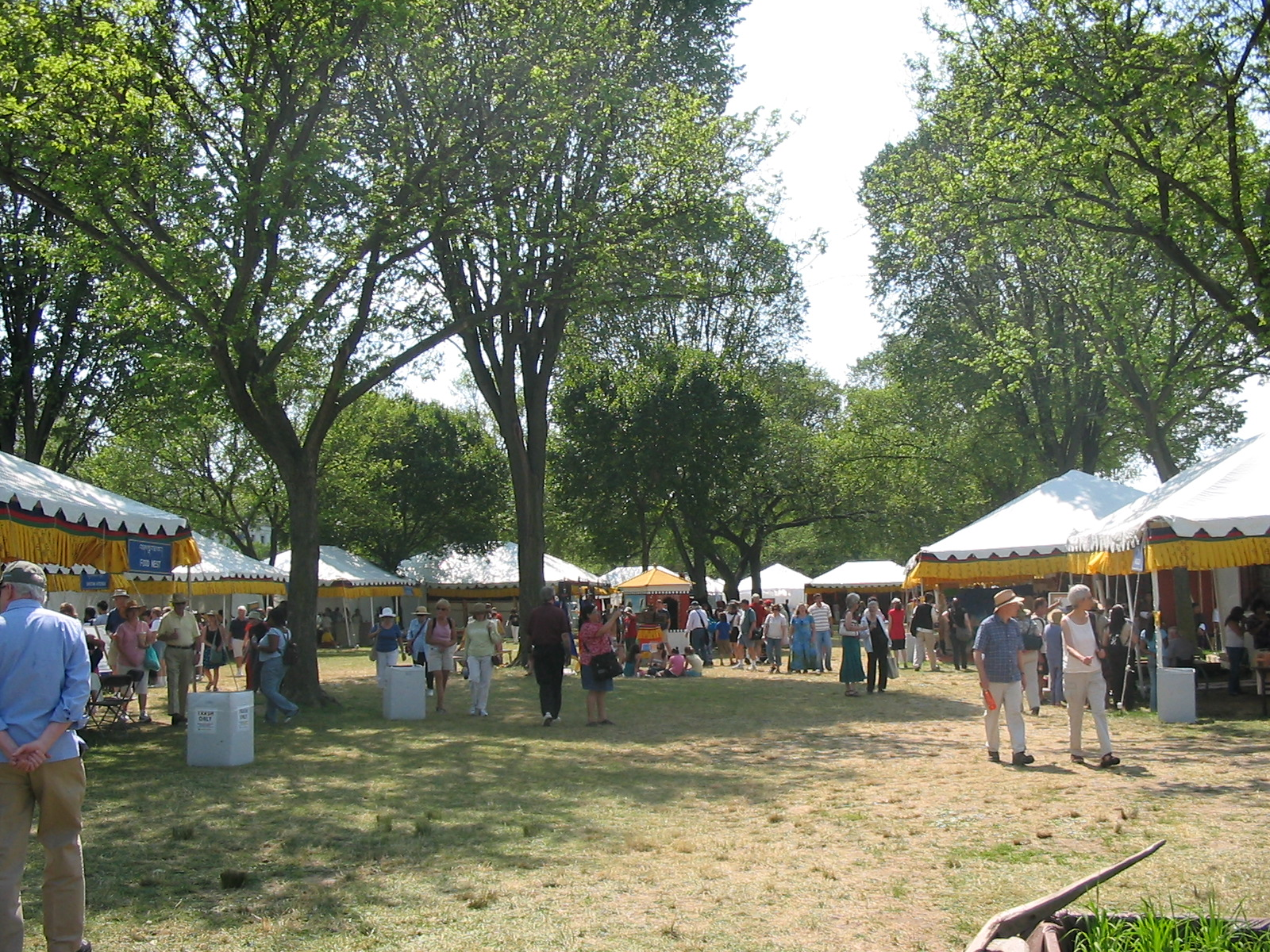
The Bhutan section of the 2008 festival

The Smithsonian Folklife Festival, launched in 1967, is an international exhibition of living cultural heritage presented annually in the summer in Washington, D.C. in the United States. It is held on the National Mall for two weeks around the Fourth of July (the U.S. Independence Day) holiday. The Smithsonian Center for Folklife and Cultural Heritage produces the festival.

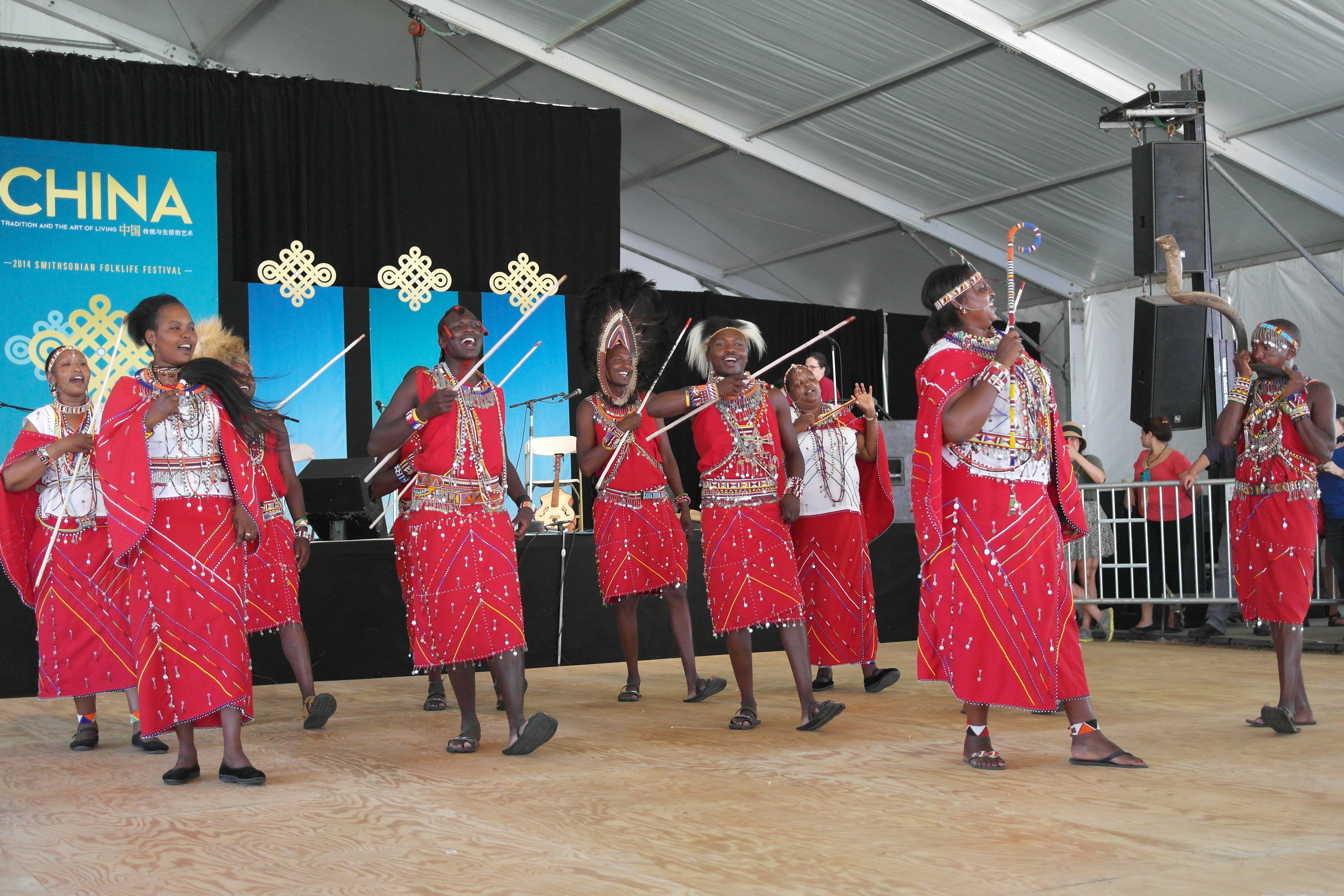
Smithsonian Folklife Festival 2014

The festival is free to the public, encouraging cultural exchange. Attracting more than one million visitors yearly, the two-week-long celebration is the largest annual cultural event in the United States capital. Usually divided into programs featuring a nation, region, state or theme, the festival has featured tradition bearers from more than ninety nations, every region of the United States, scores of ethnic communities, more than one hundred American Indian groups, and some seventy different occupations.

The festival generally includes daily and evening programs of music, song, dance, celebratory performance, crafts and cooking demonstrations, storytelling, illustrations of workers' culture, and narrative sessions for discussing cultural issues. Cultural practitioners speak for themselves, with each other, and to the public. Visitors participate, learning, singing, dancing, eating traditional foods, and conversing with people that the festival program presents.

== List of programs by year ==
The regions and topics featured at the Smithsonian Folklife Festival since its inception in 1967:

No.	Year	Topics
1	1967	Performance: American fife and drum groups; brass bands; string bands; gospel; shouts; jubilees; spirituals; Puerto Rican music; New Orleans jazz; Cajun music; ballads; Mesquakie Indian music; blues; country music; polka music; cowboy songs; clogging; Scottish, Russian, Irish dancers; Chinese New Year's Pantomime; King Island Eskimo dancers; dance of Galicia; Crafts: American basket makers, carvers, doll makers, needleworkers, potters, blacksmith, silversmith, spinners, weavers
2	1968	Texas; Native American Program: Lummi Indians; City-Country Area: Blues, bluegrass, jazz, gospel, Cajun, Basque, Indian, dancers, ballad singers; Crafts: Butter churning, sheep shearing, soap, candy, sorghum making, milling
3	1969	Pennsylvania; Performance: French singers from New Hampshire and Louisiana, Grand Ole Opry performers, Turkish, Afro-Cuban, Greek singers and dancers, ballad singers, string bands, fife and drum bands, blues, shouts, jubilees, spirituals; Crafts: Sheep shearing and wool processing, corn culture, Seminole Indian crafts, carvers and toy makers, doll makers, blacksmiths, basket maker, potter; Toby Show: Traditional Touring Tent Theater
4	1970	Arkansas; Native American Program: Southern Plains Indians; Performance: Spanish, Irish, and Scottish bagpipers, country, bluegrass music, southern blues, Sacred Harp, Portuguese-American Fado musicians, Chinese dragon dancers, shouts, spirituals, jubilees, string bands, East European folk songs; Crafts: Dairy traditions
5	1971	Ohio; Native American Program: Northwest Coast Indians; Labor Program: Meat cutters and butchers; bakery and confectionery workers; glass bottle blowers; bridge, structural, and ornamental iron workers; Performance: Puerto Rican music and dance, Cajun music, country music, ragtime, shouts, jubilees, work songs, blues, Caribbean music and dance, rock and roll, rhythm and blues, old-time banjo and fiddle music
6	1972	Maryland; Native American Program: Southwest Indians; Labor Program: ILGWU, lithographers and photoengravers, carpenters and joiners, molders and allied workers; Performance: Chicago blues, old-time country blues, gospel, First Annual Fiddlers' Convention
7	1973	Kentucky; Native American Program: Northern Plains Indians; Working Americans: Plumbers, carpenters, electricians, stonemasons, lathers, bricklayers, plasterers, millwrights, operating engineers, pipe fitters, sheet metal workers, steam fitters; Old Ways in the New World: Britain, Yugoslavia
8	1974	Mississippi; Native American Program: California tribes; Working Americans: Graphic artists, radio operators (amateur/commercial); Old Ways in the New World: Sweden, Norway, Finland, Tunisia, Greece; African Diaspora: Ghana, Trinidad and Tobago, Nigeria, Caribbean; Children's Program; Family Folklore; Performance: Evolution of American Folk Music
9	1975	Regional America: Northern Plains, California Heartland; Native American Program: Iroquois Confederacy; Working Americans: Railroad workers, aircraft employees, truckers, seafarers; Old Ways in the New World: Germany, Italy, Lebanon, Japan, Mexico; African Diaspora: Jamaica, Ghana, Haiti; Children's Program; Family Folklore
10	1976	Regional America: Northeast, Great Lakes, South, Upland South, Heartland, Great West, Pacific Northwest, Pacific Southwest; Native American Program: Tribes from the Northeast, Southeast, Southern Plains, Prairie, Northern Plains, Northwest Coast, Southwest, Plateau, Basin, Northern California, Arctic; Working Americans; Old Ways in the New World; Children's Program; Family Folklore
11	1977	Virginia; Native American Program: Ojibwa, Tolowa, San Juan Pueblo, Navajo, Seneca; Working Americans: Folklore in Your Community
12	1978	Native American Community: San Juan Pueblo of New Mexico; Occupational Community: Organ builders, sleeping car porters, sharecroppers; Energy and Community: Oil and coal industry workers; Ethnic Community: Ellis Island and American Immigration; Regional Community: Chesapeake Bay, Smith Island; Mexican Communities
13	1979	Energy and Community: Native American architecture; Folklore in Your Community; Children's Program; Medicine Show
14	1980	Old Ways in the New World: Caribbean Americans, Southeast Asian Americans, Finnish Americans; Energy and Community: Folk housing and energy efficiency, community activities, food preservation; American Talkers: Auctioneers, pitchmen, street criers
15	1981	Regional America: Southeastern U.S. music and crafts, Northeastern music and dance; Native American Program: Ojibwa Indians; Old Ways in the New World: South Slavic Americans; Energy and Community: Adobe architecture; Children's Program; Folklore of the Deaf; American Tent Show, National Endowment for the Arts Program
16	1982	Oklahoma, Korea, Children's Program, National Endowment for the Arts Program
17	1983	New Jersey, France, Occupational Culture: Flight, NEA: National Heritage Fellowship Awards
18	1984	Alaska, The Grand Generation: Folklore and Aging, Black Urban Expressive Culture from Philadelphia
19	1985	Louisiana; India: Mela!; Cultural Conservation: Makah and Puerto Rican mask makers; African American cornrowers, Kmhmu craftsmen, Seneca basket makers, Appalachian balladry, Cajun music, cowboy music, song, and poetry, Irish music, Mayan marimba music Mayan Indian weaving
20	1986	Tennessee; Japan; Cultural Conservation: Traditional Crafts in a Post-industrial Age; American Trial Lawyers; 20th Anniversary Music Stage
21	1987	Michigan; Cultural Conservation and Languages: America's Many Voices; Metropolitan Washington
22	1988	Ingenuity and Tradition: The Commonwealth of Massachusetts; Cultural Conservation: American Folklore Society Centennial; Migration to Metropolitan Washington: Making a New Place Home; Music from the Peoples of the Soviet Union; Music Festival Stage: Bluegrass
23	1989	Hawaii, Cultural Conservation: American Indian Program; "Les Fetes Chez Nous": France and North America, Quincentenary Program: The Caribbean-Cultural Encounters in the New World
24	1990	US Virgin Islands, Senegal, Musics of Struggle
25	1991	Family Farming in the Heartland; Indonesia: Forest, Field, and Sea; Land in Native American Cultures; Roots of Rhythm and Blues: the Robert Johnson Era
26	1992	New Mexico, Creativity and Resistance: Maroon Culture in the Americas, Workers at the White House, the Changing Soundscape in Indian Country
27	1993	US-Mexico Borderlands, American Social Dance, metro Music, Kids' Stuff
28	1994	Masters of Traditional Arts: National Heritage Fellowships, The Bahamas, Thailand, Culture and Development in Latin America and the Caribbean
29	1995	Cape Verdean Connection; Russian Roots/American Branches; Heartbeat: Voices of First Nations Women;Czech Republic: Tradition and Transformation
30	1996	Iowa-Community Style; American South; Working at the Smithsonian
31	1997	Mississippi Delta; African Immigrant Folklife; Sacred Sounds
32	1998	Wisconsin; Rio Grande/rio Bravo Basin; Baltic Nations: Estonia, Latvia, and Lithuania; Pahiyas: A Philippine Harvest; Folkways 50th
33	1999	Celebrating New Hampshire's Stories; Gateways to Romania; South Africa: Crafting the Economic Renaissance of the Rainbow Nation
34	2000	El Rio, Tibetan Culture: Beyond the Land of Snows; Washington, D.C.: It's Our Home
35	2001	New York City at the Smithsonian, Masters of the Building Arts; Bermuda Connections
36	2002	The Silk Road: Connecting Cultures, Creating Trust, including exhibits on Venice, Istanbul, Samarkand, nomads, Xi'an, truck art from Pakistan, and Nara
37	2003	Appalachia: Heritage and Harmony; Scotland at the Smithsonian; Mali: From Timbuktu to Washington
38	2004	Haiti: Freedom and Creativity from the Mountains to the Sea; Nuestra Música: Music in Latino Culture; Water Ways: Mid-Atlantic Maritime Communities
39	2005	Food Culture USA, Forest Service, Culture, and Community; Oman: Desert, Oasis, and Sea; Nuestra Música: Music in Latino Culture
40	2006	Alberta at the Smithsonian; Been in the Storm So Long: New Orleans Evening Concert Series; Carriers of Culture: Living Native Basket Traditions; Nuestra Música: Latino Chicago
41	2007	Mekong River: Connecting Cultures; Northern Ireland at the Smithsonian; Roots of Virginia Culture
42	2008	Bhutan: Land of the Thunder Dragon; NASA: Fifty Years and Beyond; Texas: A Celebration of Music, Food, and Wine
43	2009	Giving Voice: The Power of Words in African American Culture; Las Américas: Un Mundo Musical (The Americas: A Musical World); Wales Smithsonian Cymru
44	2010	Asian Pacific American Connections: Local Lives, Global Ties; Mexico; Smithsonian Inside Out; Special Events: Haiti, Ralph Rinzler Memorial Concert, George Wallace, Smithsonian 3D
45	2011	Colombia: The Nature of Culture; Peace Corps: 50th Anniversary; Rhythm and Blues: Tell It Like It Is
46	2012	Campus and Community: Public and Land-grant Universities and the USDA at 150; Citified: Arts and Creativity East of the Anacostia River; Creativity and Crisis: Unfolding The AIDS Memorial Quilt
47	2013	Hungarian Heritage: Roots to Revival; One World, Many Voices: Endangered Languages and Cultural Heritage; The Will to Adorn: African American Diversity, Style and Identity
48	2014	China: Tradition and the Art of Living; Kenya: Mambo Poa
49	2015	Perú: Pachamama. Artists included Monky, who demonstrated artistic techniques, led daily workshops, and spoke with visitors; and Elliot Túpac, who painted a mural of the word Libertad
50	2016	Basque: Innovation by Culture; Sounds of California
51	2017	Circus Arts; On The Move: Migration Across Generations; 50 Years, 50 Objects: Storied Objects from the Smithsonian Folklife Festival; 50th Anniversary: 1967-2017
52	2018	Armenia: Creating Home; Catalonia: Tradition and Creativity from the Mediterranean; Sisterfire: Roadwork 40th Anniversary Concert
53	2019	Social Power of Music (Festival shortened to two days and downscaled due to effects of the 2018–19 United States federal government shutdown.)
54	2020	Beyond the Mall. (The 2020 festival was held online for Covid-19 safety restrictions). Story Circles: virtual conversations around music, religion, and traditional culture.
55	2021	Beyond the Mall: Making Matters.
56	2022	Earth Optimism x Folklife: Inspiring Conservation Communities. United Arab Emirates: Living Landscape | Living Memory.
57	2023	The Ozarks: Faces and Facets of a Region; Creative Encounters: Living Religions in the U.S.; Soul of Tengri: Kazakh Traditions and Rituals.
58	2024	Indigenous Voices of the Americas
59	2025	Youth and the Future of Culture
60	2026	Culture Of, By, and For the People: a nine-month rolling party at large and small festivals around the country. (National Mall was unavailable due to the Great American State Fair.)

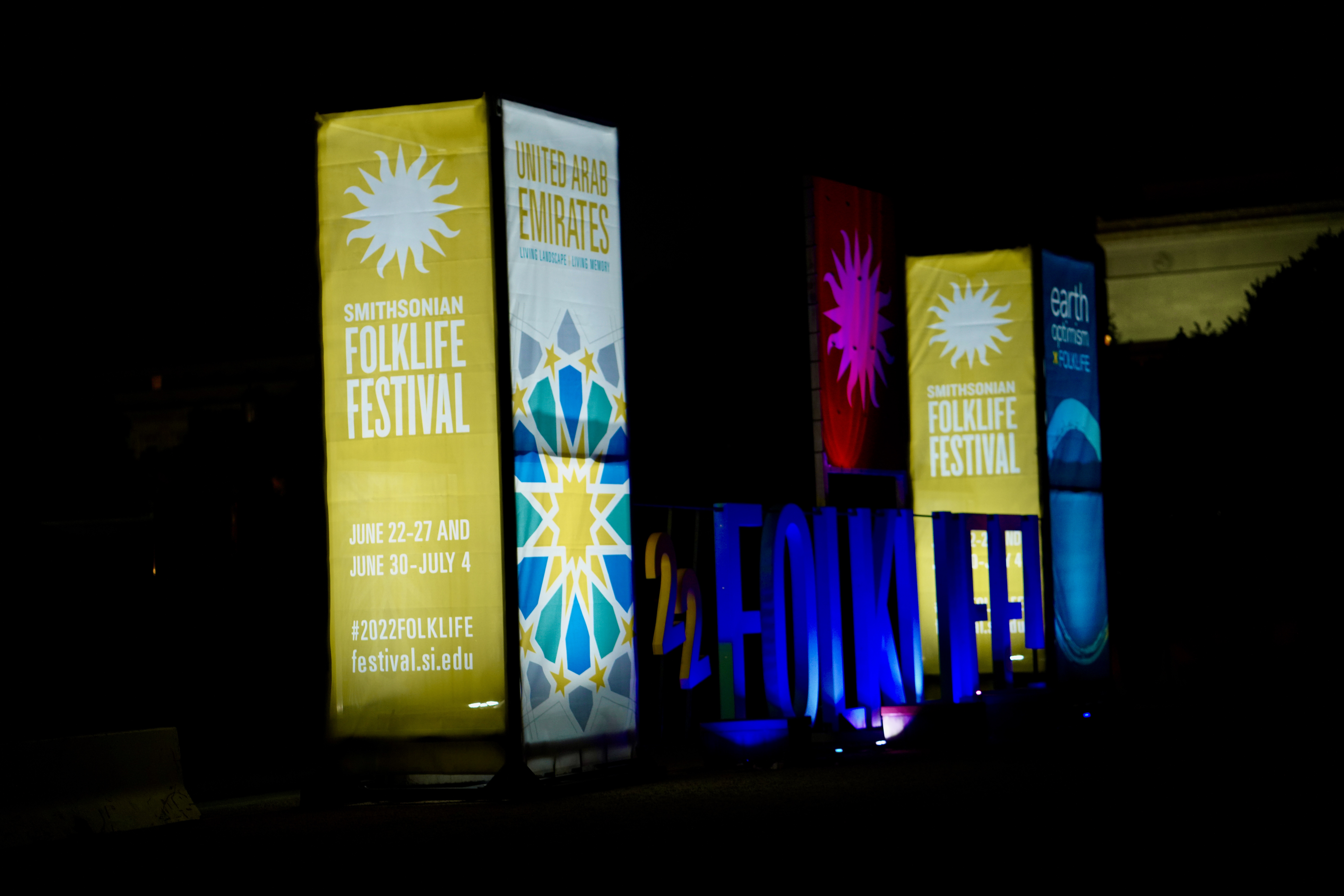
Smithsonian Folklife Festival 2022 at night, Washington, D.C.

== 1976 Bicentennial festival ==
As part of the nationwide Bicentennial celebration, the 1976 American Folklife Festival was extended into a 12-week event held from June 16 to September 6. Years of preparation in collaboration with thousands of scholars, performers, and preservationists produced programs, activities, and outdoor exhibitions running five days a week, Wednesday through Sunday. The festival took place in the western part of the National Mall, south of the Lincoln Memorial Reflecting Pool.

== Scenes from the 2008 festival ==
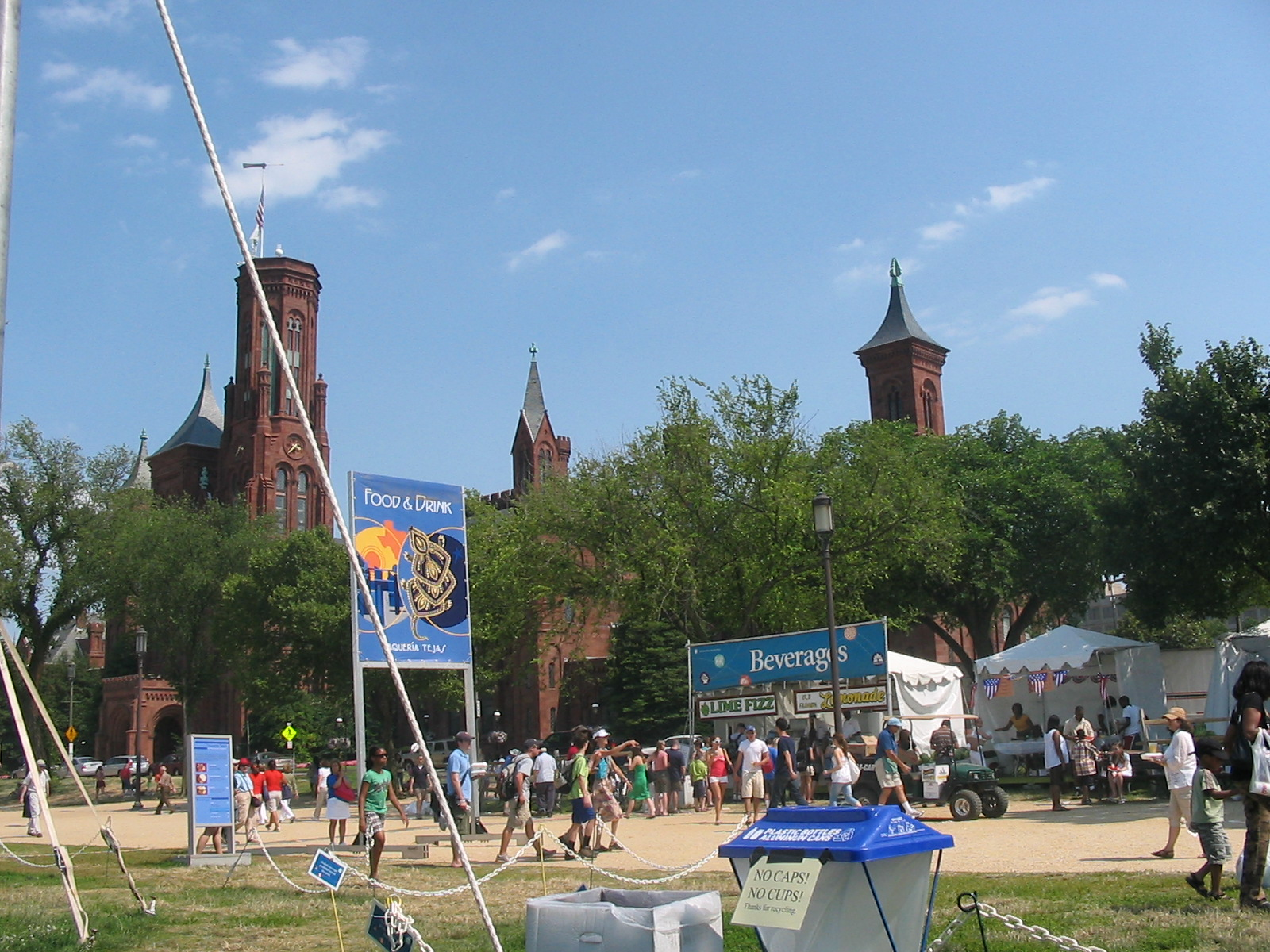
Food and drink tents at the Festival

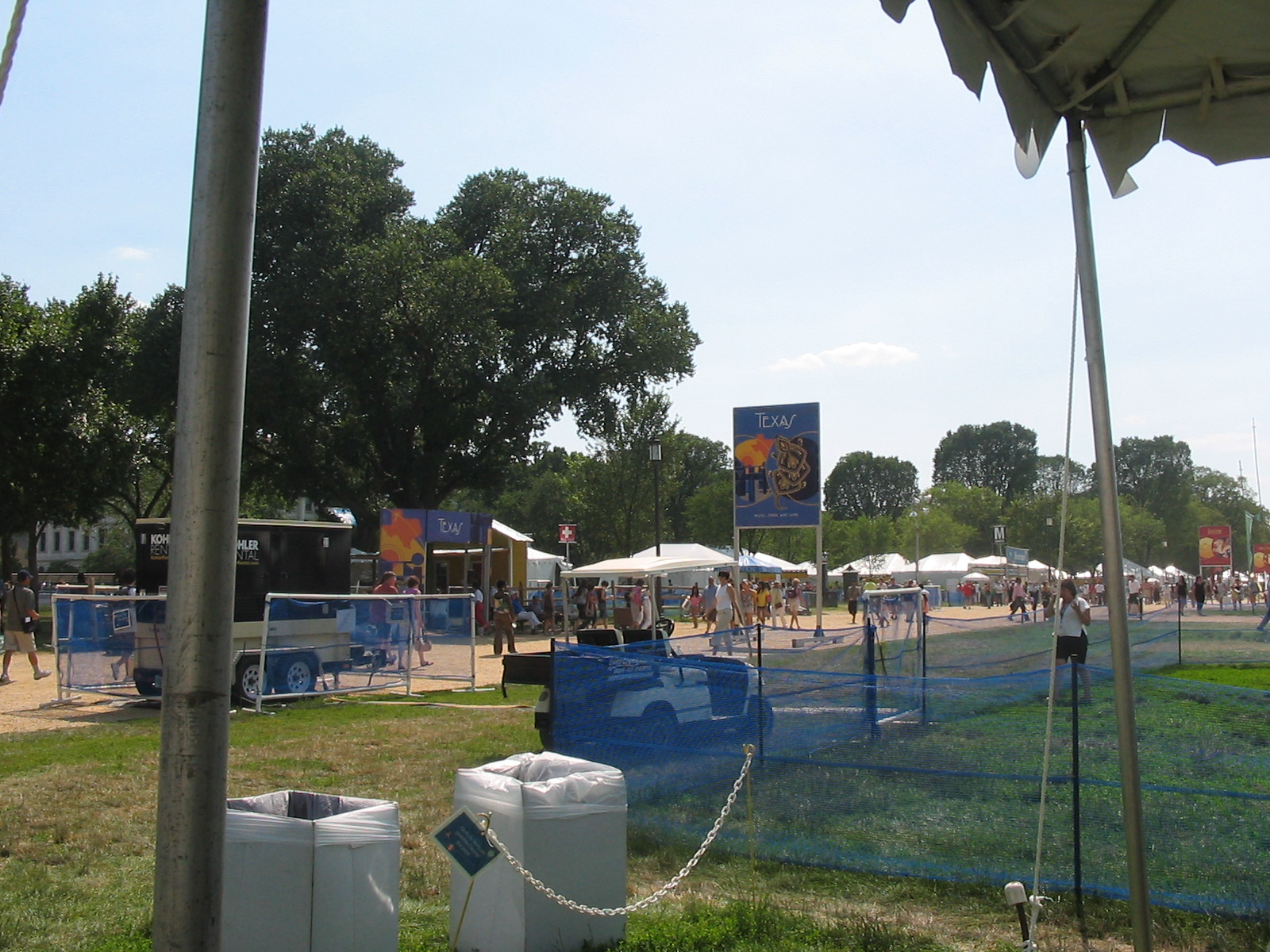
Texas section of the exhibit area

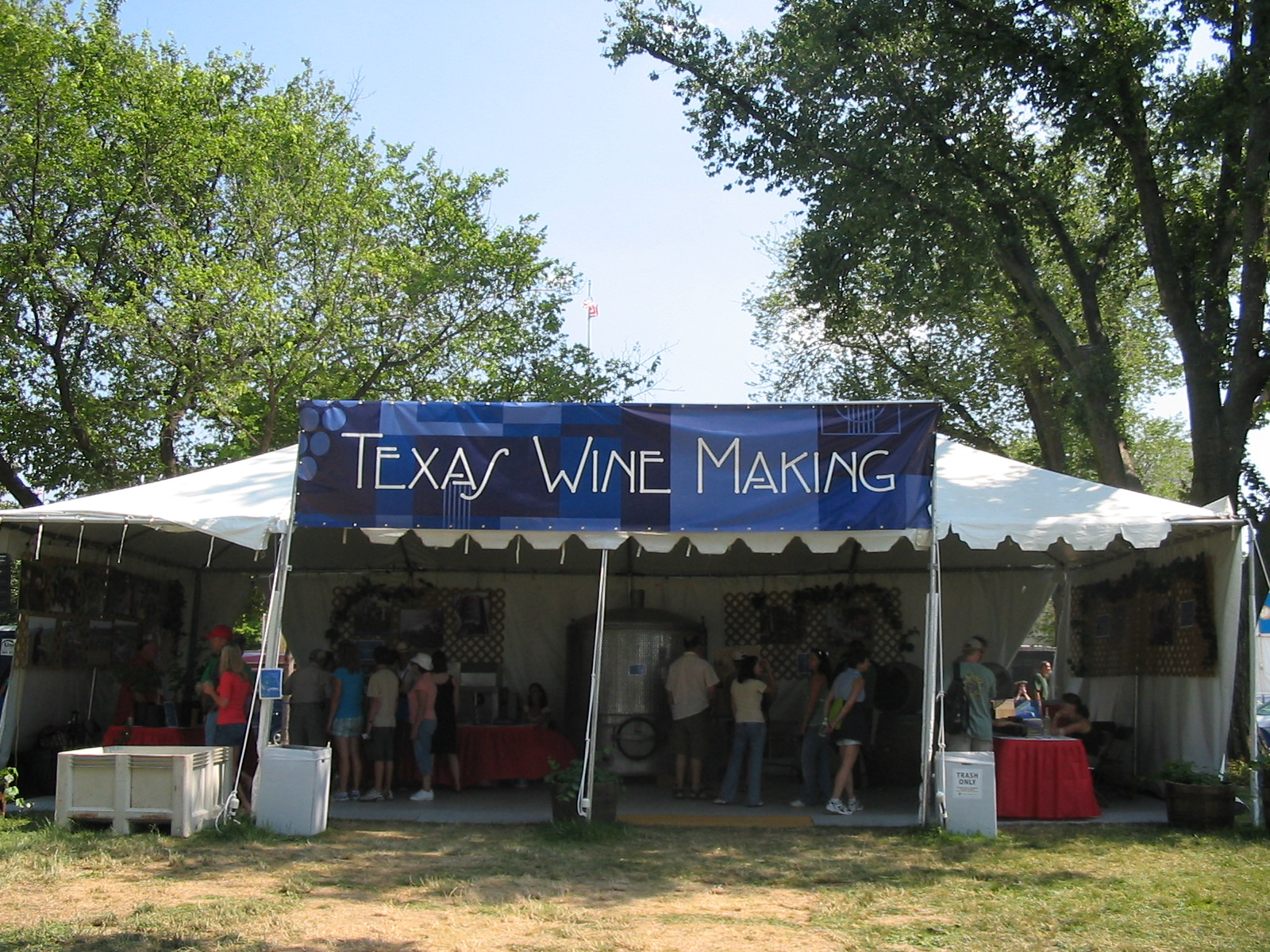
Texas winemaking tent

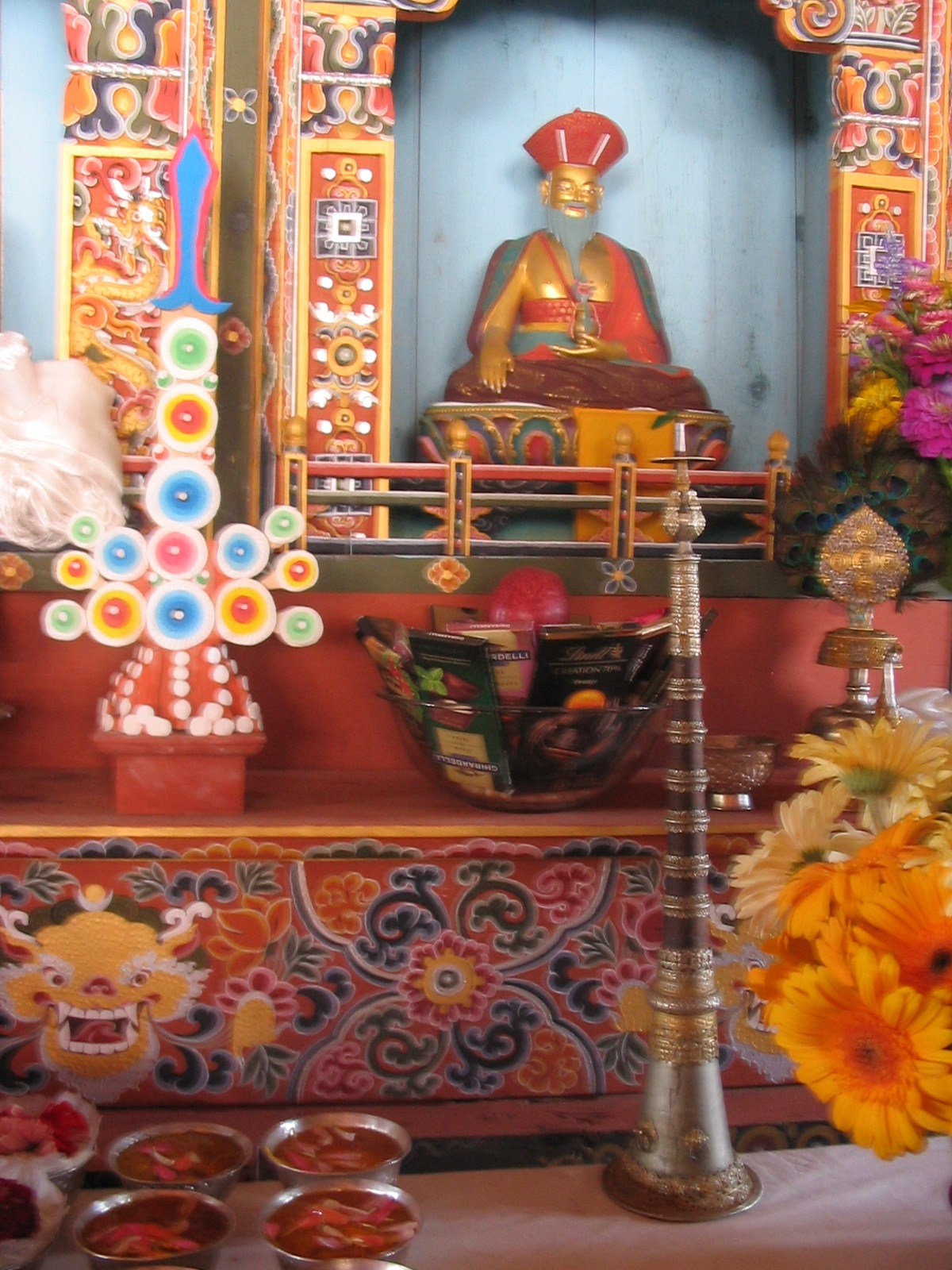
Interior of a Bhutanese temple erected on the National Mall

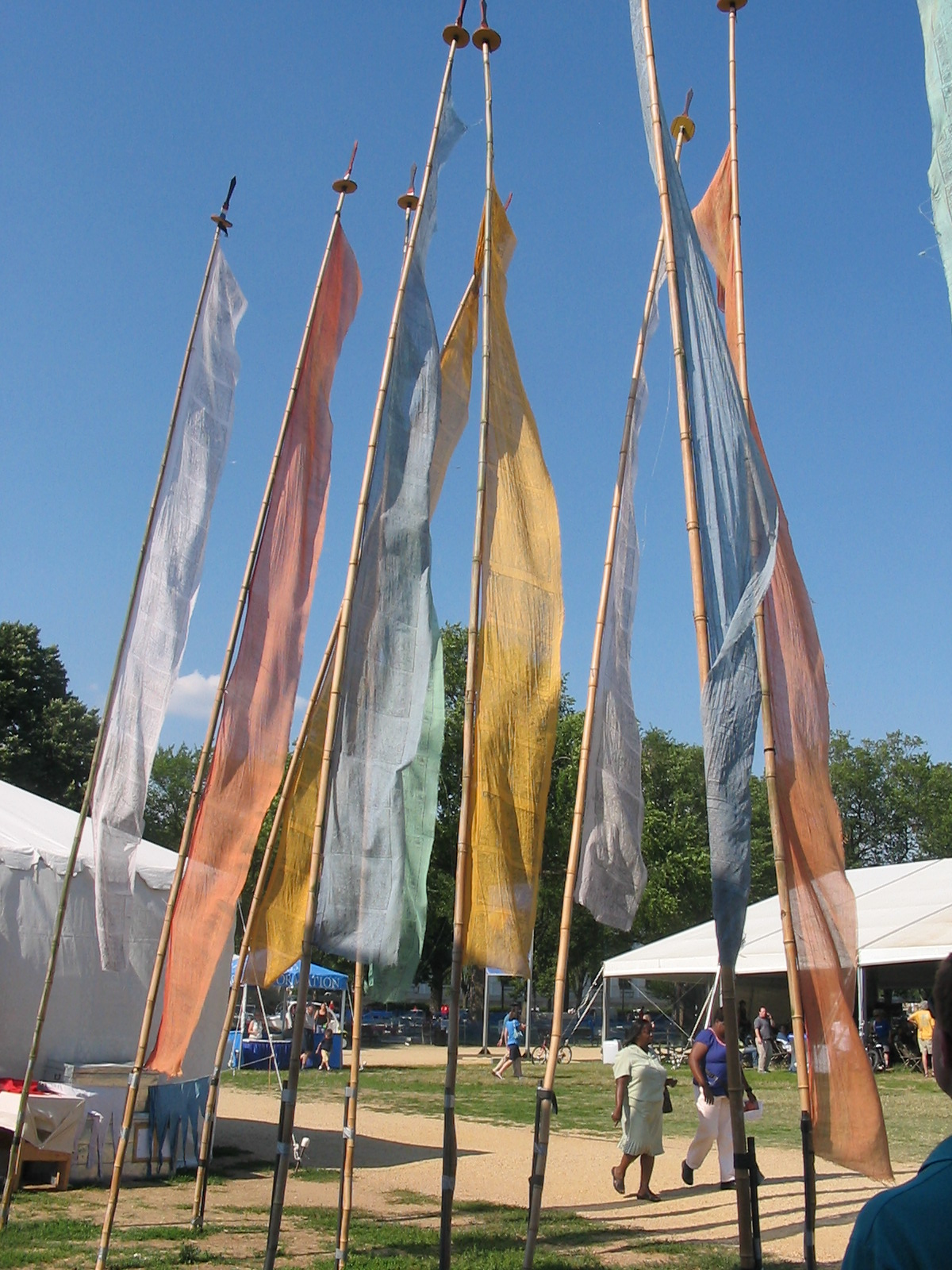
Prayer flags erected on the National Mall in front of the temple

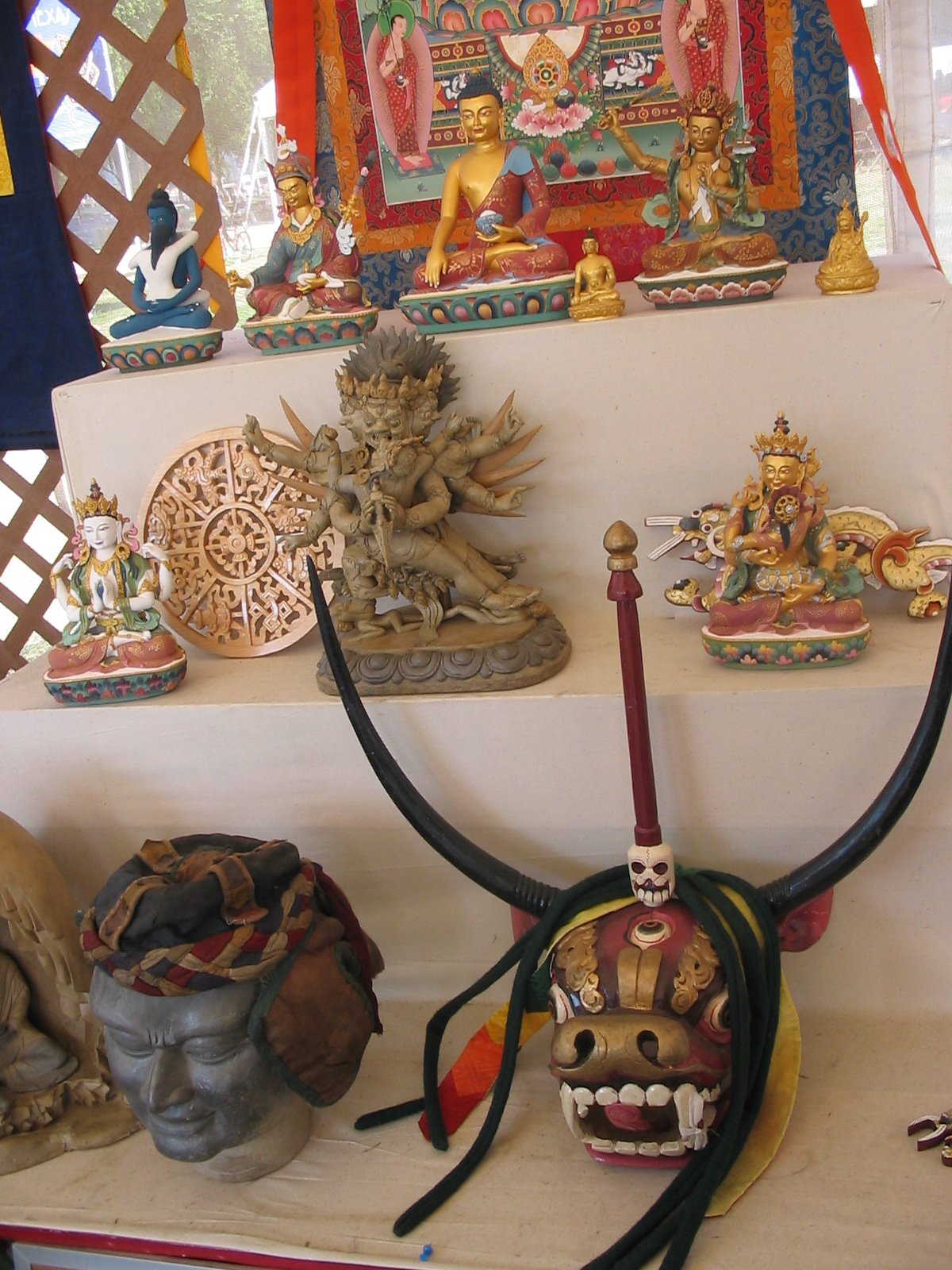
Masks and other objects in the Bhutanese craft tent

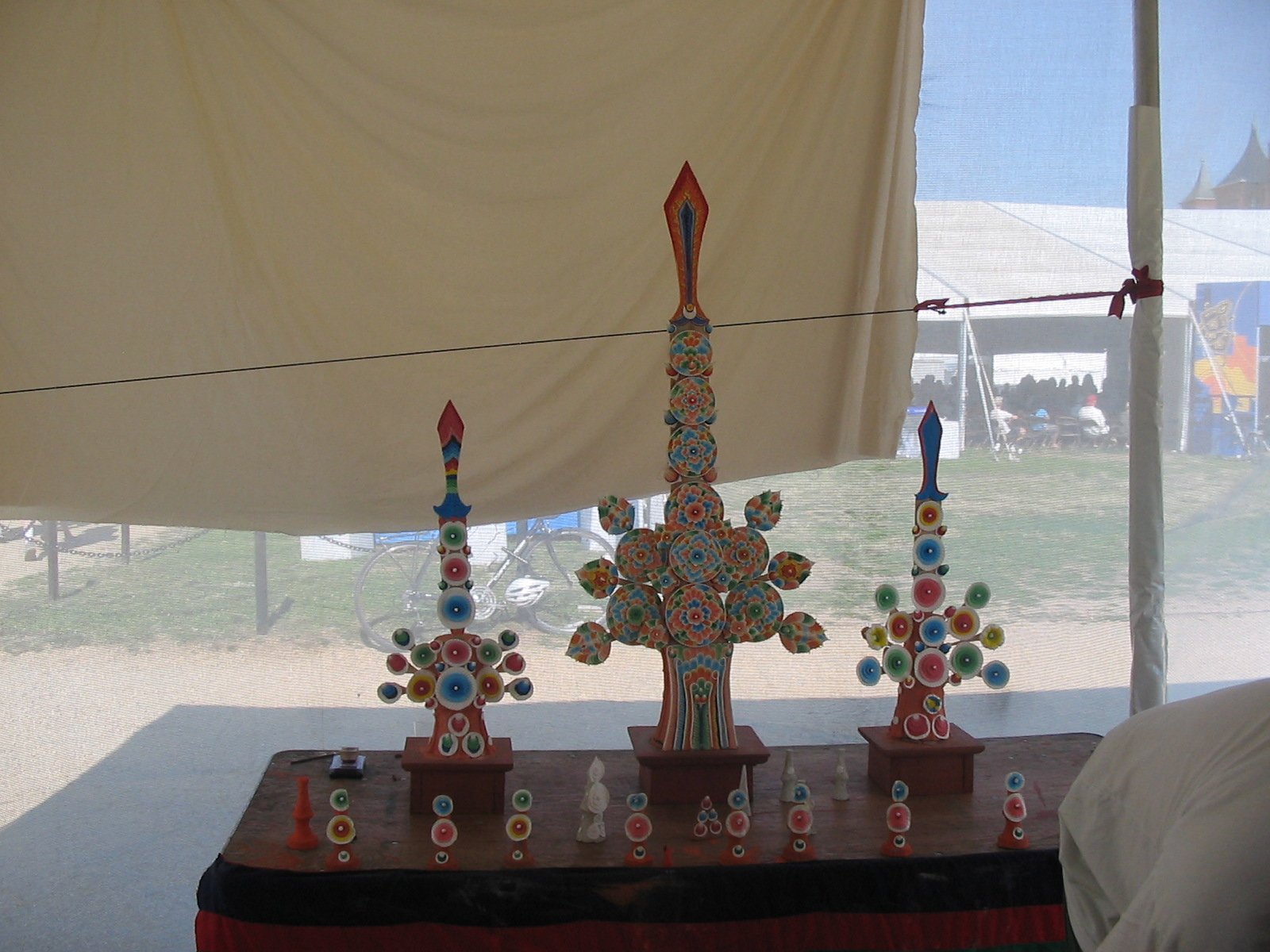
Religious objects in the craft tent

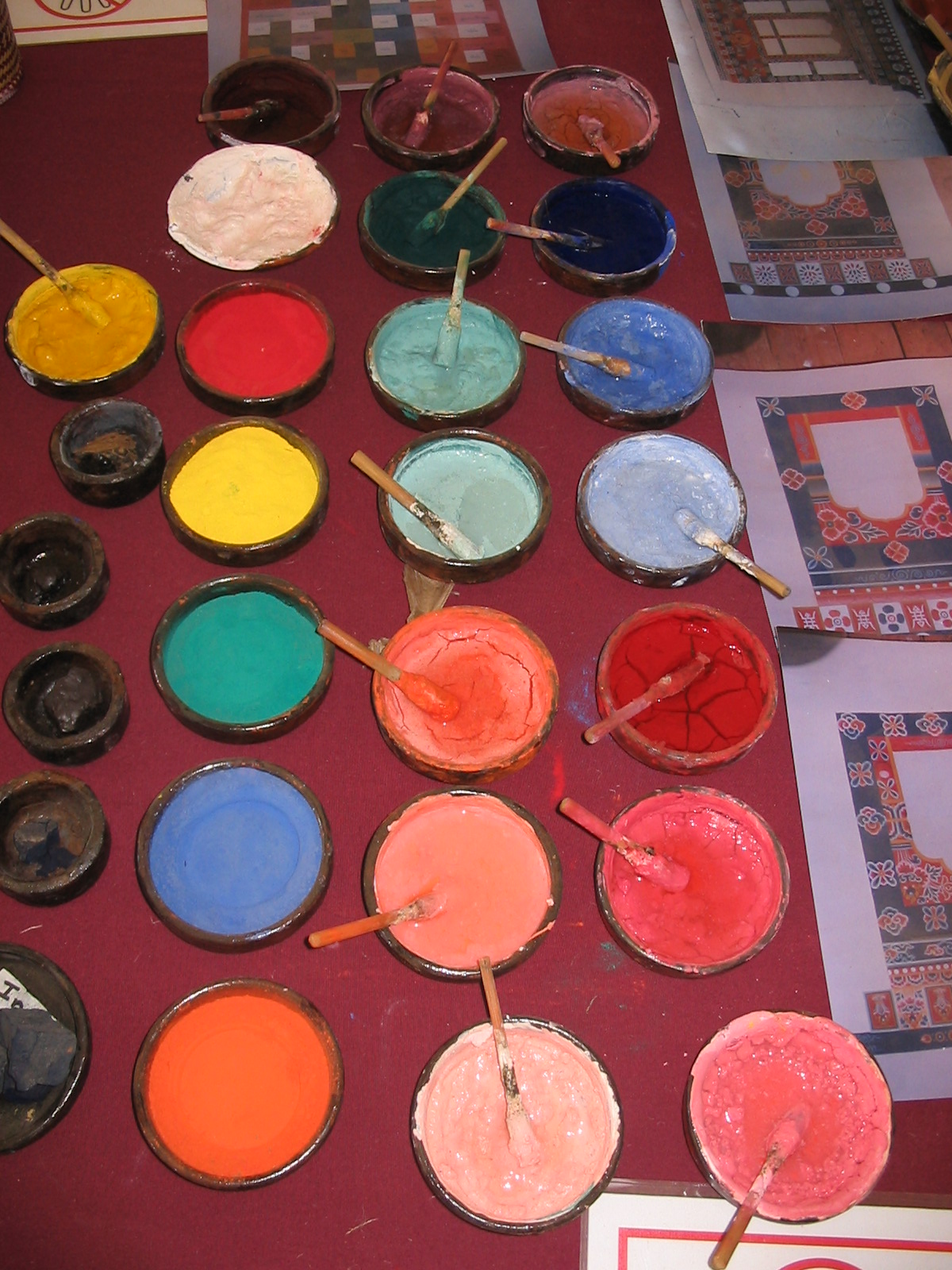
Pigment pots in the tent dedicated to Bhutanese traditional painting
