= Los Destellos =

Peruvian cumbia band

- Origin: Lima, Peru
- Genres: Peruvian cumbia; Psychedelic rock
- Years active: 1966–1996 (original lineup)
- Labels: Iempsa; Odeon
- Past members: Enrique Delgado Montes; Fernando Quiroz; Carlos Ramírez; Edith Delgado Montes; Tito Caycho; Eduardo Rivera; Rodolfo Casaretto

Los Destellos (Spanish for "the Flashes") is a Peruvian cumbia band formed in Lima, Peru in 1966 by Enrique Delgado Montes.

== History ==
In their early releases, Los Destellos popularized the sharp sound of the electric guitar and bass in the context of a cumbia ensemble. By replacing the horns and accordion with the strings, they played a key role in developing the genre that later became known as Peruvian cumbia, influencing bands such as Los Mirlos, Los Ecos, and Los Diablos Rojos. The band's style bears influence from psychedelic and surf rock as well as cumbia and local Peruvian genres.

In 1970, the band released their best-selling single, "Elsa", which sold over a million copies. Under Edith Delgado Montes' leadership, a reformed Los Destellos recorded several songs for the 2009 Peruvian film The Milk of Sorrow.

== Discography ==
- 1968: Los Destellos
- 1969: En Órbita
- 1969: Solo Ellos
- 1970: Mundial...
- 1971: En La Cumbre
- 1971: Clase... Aparte
- 1971: Constelación
- 1973: Arrollando
- 1974: Destellantes
- 1975: Linda Chiquilina
- 1976: Ojos Azules
- 1976: En Jira Por Todo El Perú
- 1977: Los Incomparables Del Ritmo
- 1978: 10 años de triunfo
- 1979: Yo Mismo Soy
- 1980: Para Todo El Mundo
- 1986: El retorno triunfal de Enrique Delgado y sus Destellos
- 1996: Los Destellos Homenaje a Enrique Delgado
- 2014: 38 Años de Cumbia Los Destellos
