= Tongo (entertainer) =

Peruvian singer and entertainer (1957–2023)

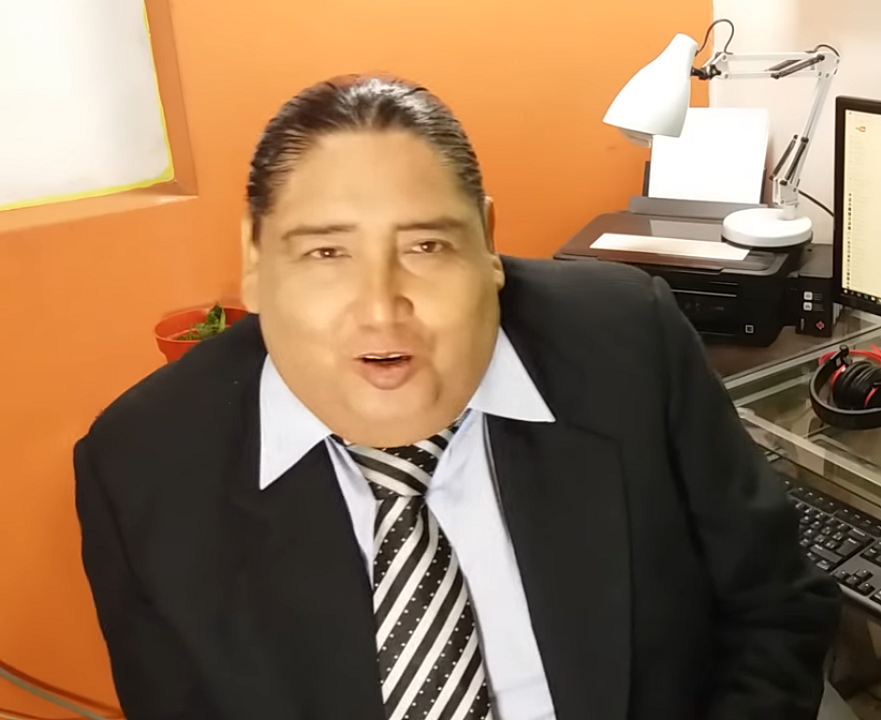
- Tongo in 2017
- Born: José Abelardo Gutiérrez Alanya; 24 September 1957; El Tambo, Huancayo, Peru
- Died: 10 March 2023 (aged 65); Lima, Peru
- Other names: Tongo; Le Tongué
- Spouse: Gladys Lupinta

TikTok information
- Page: Gutierrez Abelardo
- Followers: 188 thousand

YouTube information
- Channel: Tongo Oficial
- Genres: Music; comedy; vlogs; entertainment
- Subscribers: 1.15 million
- Views: 140 million
- Musical career
- Genres: Peruvian cumbia; comedy rock; parody
- Occupations: Singer; entertainer; YouTuber; comedian
- Instrument: Vocals
- Years active: 1980–2022
- Last updated: 23 Apr 2026

José Abelardo Gutiérrez Alanya (24 September 1957 – 10 March 2023), known by his stage name Tongo, was a Peruvian singer and entertainer. He began his music career in 1980 as a singer of Peruvian cumbia, a type of popular music. Tongo was largely unknown outside of his musical niche (traditionally of the lower class) until his song "La pituca", whose theme focuses on social status and inequality, attained national notability at the start of the twenty-first century. In 2010, Peruvian newspaper El Comercio listed Tongo as one of the most popular artists in Peruvian show business.

== Background ==
An important part of Tongo's success was his amiable relationship with the Peruvian mainstream media and willingness to use his popularity towards commercial advertisements and political campaigns. His tumultuous friendship with Emmy Award-winning writer and journalist Jaime Bayly proved particularly crucial for Tongo's rise to fame, as he became a regular guest in Bayly's television program in Peru. In the realm of politics, aside from promoting Bayly's election to the presidency with the song "Jaime para presidente", Tongo unsuccessfully ran for Congress in 2005 and caused controversy (and a strain in his friendship with Bayly) when he participated in Lourdes Flores's 2010 campaign for the mayorship of Lima.

Tongo's national stardom reached its peak in 2008, when he released a purposely goofy English version of "La pituca". The song, notorious for its orthographical errors and erroneous verse translations, surpassed the popularity of the original and even became a YouTube hit. Since then, he has continued to entice the public with intentionally comedic cover versions of mainstream songs, including "Ai Se Eu Te Pego", Justin Bieber's "Baby", Psy's "Gangnam Style", Foster the People's "Pumped Up Kicks", System of a Down's "Chop Suey!" and Linkin Park's "Numb". He later went on to cover Eminem's "Rap God", Michael Jackson's "Billie Jean" (Bili Yin) and Eagles's "Hotel California".

== Musical career ==
=== 2010–2016 ===
In 2011, after a few years without recording any new major hits, Tongo made a cover version for The Beatles' song "Let It Be". Under the title of "Lady bi", the song was Tongo's first cover version of a song in English. That same year he performed it at Peru's Teleton. Nonetheless, Tongo's major success for 2011 was his cover version of the popular Justin Bieber song "Baby". The cover became an instant internet sensation, and aided in Tongo's return to major popular music venues in Peru. In October of that year, Latin Grammy-award-winning singer-songwriter Gian Marco in a light-hearted Facebook message congratulated the singer for his new hit cover (Spanish: "Ayyyy! Tongo, Tongo, Tongo! tú eres el único en este planeta que puede hacer este tipo de cosas! jajajajaja! un éxito!! jajajajaja!"). Both songs followed the trend of "La pituca (en Ingles)" in that they deliberately used verbally incorrect English. He also dedicated a song to the pisco sour amidst celebrations for the cocktail's national holiday.

=== 2017 YouTube Covers ===
In late 2016, Tongo performed a cover of "Chop Suey!" by System of a Down, which received attention from other YouTube Channels and media. Tongo subsequently covered Linkin Park's "Numb". During Linkin Park's One More Light World Tour visit to Peru, Mike Shinoda reacted to the song by joking "Oh my God! That's amazing! This is fantastic! I love this (...) Can we put that? That's amazing, like, end of the show's music?" Two weeks later, Shinoda shared the song through his Twitter account.

On 20 July 2017, following Chester Bennington's death, Tongo announced he will honor his memory by making a cover of "In the End". The cover was released on 27 August 2017.

=== 2020 TikTok Emergence ===
In May 2020, Tongo uploaded a video to YouTube titled "TONGO EN TIK TOK. BUSCAME COMO TONGO PERÚ." He uploaded his first video to TikTok on 14 May 2020, under the username "tongoperu." He has since amassed over 78,000 followers and has uploaded new videos to the platform almost every day.

=== 2021-2022 Livestream Fundraising ===
As Tongo's health declined from 2021 to his death in 2023, he made a habit of livestreaming on YouTube to solicit donations through which he hoped to pay his medical expenses. He had livestreamed prior, but these streams differed in that he would provide calls to action to his viewers in which he would sing one of his songs to them if they donated money through YouTube's Super Chat system. There was often someone aiding him with the streams, which appeared to originate from a mobile device such as a cell phone. It is unknown whether the income from the streams made a meaningful impact on his medical progress.

== Personal life and death ==
In 2010, Jaime Bayly announced that he would make Tongo the godfather of his third child. The singer reacted positively to the announcement and, proclaiming himself an oracle, predicted the child would be a male and future player of Sporting Cristal.

Tongo lived in Miraflores District, Lima. He died from kidney failure complicated by diabetes on 10 March 2023, at the age of 65.
