= Chicha, Pakistan =

Coordinates: 31°17′N 73°01′E

Chicha
- Village
- Location within Pakistan
- Country: Pakistan
- Province: Punjab
- District: Faisalabad
- Time zone: UTC+5 (PST)

Chicha is a village of Faisalabad District in the Punjab province of Pakistan. It is part of Iqbal town and is one of the villages under Chak 254. These villages are situated on Samundari Road and Chicha village is 18 km from the main Faisalabad city. The population of Chicha is only a few hundred people.
