= Lorenzo Palacios Quispe =

Peruvian musician (1950–1994)

Lorenzo Palacios
- Also known as: El Elegante, Chacalón
- Born: Lorenzo Palacios Quispe; April 26, 1950
- Origin: Lima, Peru
- Died: June 24, 1994 (aged 44)
- Genres: Chicha
- Occupation: Singer
- Instrument: Voice
- Formerly of: La Nueva Crema

Lorenzo Palacios Quispe (April 26, 1950 in Lima, Peru – June 24, 1994) was a Peruvian singer and musician. He arose under the artist name Chacalón (Big Jackal). He is often referred to as El Faraón de la Chicha ("The Pharaoh of Chicha music-('Peruvian Cumbia')).

== Biography ==
Chacalón was born in one of the squatter settlements (Barriadas or Pueblos Jóvenes) of Lima to a migrant family from Ayacucho, one of the poorest departments of Peru. Lorenzo grew up on the urban hill of San Cosme in the La Victoria district under very poor conditions. His father Lorenzo Palacios Huaypacusi, whom Palacios never got to know, was a dancer. His mother Olimpia Quispe was a singer. He was raised by her mother and his stepfather Silverio Escalante from the age of two. He had fourteen half-brothers and sisters. Chacalón lived under extreme poverty and under the alcoholism of his mother. As youths, he and his brother used to sing on the streets of Lima for money.

It is not clear how he earned the name "Chacalon". It is said that his younger brother was known as Chacalito (little Jackal); and he became Chacalon (Big Jackal) since he was older.

His first appearances were in 1965. To improve the economic situation of his family, he also worked as an assistant shoemaker.

In 1968, his wife Dora gave birth to their first child, Esther. Chacalón and his wife married four years later. Chacalón reached and enjoyed the largest success of his artistic career with his band La Nueva Crema (The New Cream), whose name was inspired by his love of the British rock band Cream.

In 1994, after suffering from diabetes, he was hospitalized in a local clinic. He died at the age of 44, on Friday, June 24. More than 60,000 people attended his burial in Lima's El Ángel Cemetery.

== Discography ==
Some of his most well-known titles were:

- Soy provinciano (I am from the Provinces)
- Como un ave (Like a Bird)
- Viento (Wind)
- Por que la quiero (Because I Love Her)
- Pagarás algún día (One Day You Will Pay)
- Mi dolor (My Pain)
- Ven mi amor (Come my Love)
- Cruz marcada (Marked Cross)
- Por ella, la botella (For Her, the Bottle)
- Triste y abandonado (Sad and Abandoned)
