= Los Mirlos =

Peruvian musical group

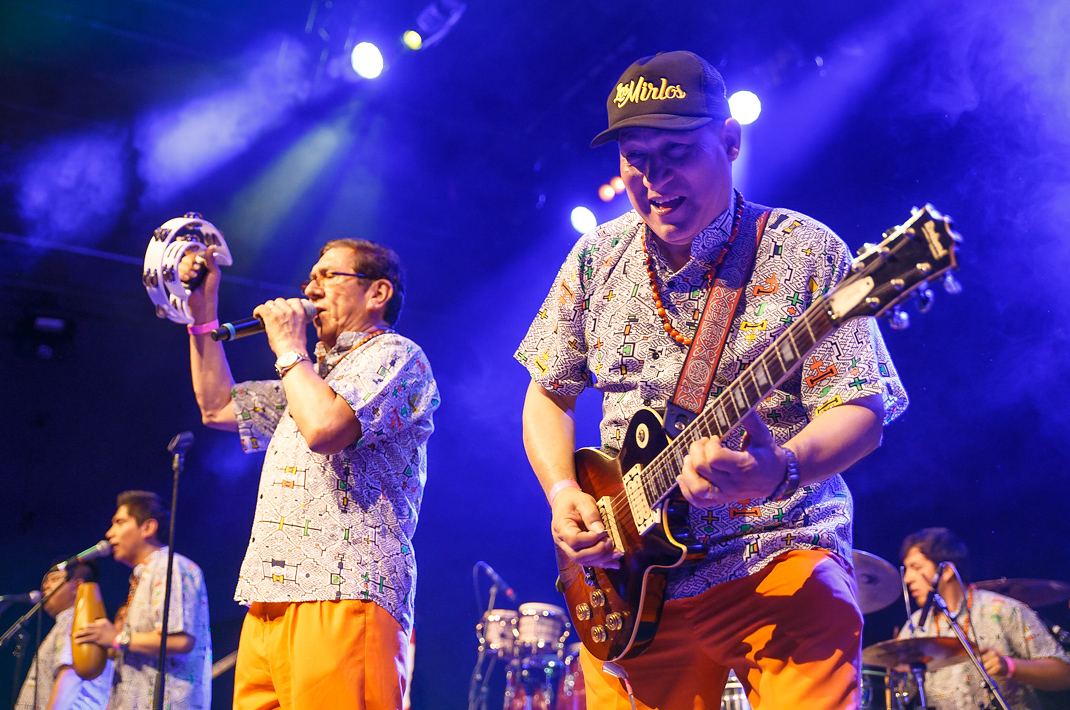
- Los Mirlos performing in Munich in 2018

Background information
- Origin: Moyobamba, Peru
- Genres: Peruvian cumbia; Psychedelic rock
- Years active: 1972–present
- Labels: Magenta; Epic; Discos Gas; Infopesa
- Members: Jorge Rodríguez Grández; Danny Jhonston; Jorge Luís Rodríguez Pérez; Yván Marcos Loyola; Abel Ramírez; Carlos Fernando Rengifo; Genderson Pinedo
- Past members: Julio Mau Orlandini; Raúl Pastor; Luis Lucho Ramos; Gilberto Reátegui; Tony Wagner Grández; Carlos Vásquez; Hugo Jáuregui; Manuel Linares; Juan Alarcón; Gilberto Chamorro; Segundo Gustavo Rodríguez; Roger Rodríguez
- Website: www.losmirlos.com

Los Mirlos (Spanish for "the Blackbirds") is a Peruvian cumbia band with origins in Moyobamba, Peru.

== History ==
The band was originally formed when some of the band's founders moved from the town of Moyobamba in Peruvian Amazonia to Lima in 1972; they were signed by the record label Infopesa the next year and would go on to release nine albums and two compilation records with the label. Their music bears influence from psychedelic and surf rock as well as cumbia, with members of the band citing the music of groups such as Los Destellos and Los Chamas as important influences. The band often emphasised their connection with the Peruvian jungle.

Some consider the music of Los Mirlos to be simply psychedelic cumbia.

The founding members of the group are:

- Jorge Rodríguez Grández (lead voice)
- Danny Fardy Johnston (guitar)
- Gilberto Reátegui (guitar)
- Wagner Grández (backing vocals, bongo)
- Carlos Vásquez (percussion)
- Hugo Jáuregui (timpani)
- Manuel Linares (bass)

In 2022, a documentary about the band titled Mirlo's Dance premiered at the 26th Lima Film Festival. It was commercially released on February 29, 2024, in Peruvian theaters. The documentary won the Best Documentary Feature Film at the 9th Trujillo Film Festival.

== Discography ==
Studio albums

- 1973: El Sonido Selvático, Infopesa 8043
- 1974: El Poder Verde, Infopesa 8061
- 1975: Los Charapas de Oro, Infopesa 8069
- 1975: El Milagro Verde, Infopesa 8088
- 1976: Tirense con la escoba, Infopesa 8097
- 1977: Tu Ñaña, Infopesa 8108
- 1978: Internacionalmente, Infopesa
- 1980: Con sabor a selva, Infopesa
- 1982: Lo nuevo de Los Mirlos, Pantel
- 1984: Cumbia Thriller, CBS
- 1986: El encanto de Los Mirlos
- 1988: Los Reyes de la cumbia amazónica, Microfón
- 1989: Con sabor a cumbia, Música & Marketing
- 1990: La Ladrona, Música & Marketing
- 1991: La Historia de Los Mirlos, Música & Marketing
- 1992: Los Mirlos, with Raúl Pastor, Magenta
- 1993: Pídeme la luna, Magenta
- 1994: Minuto a minuto, Magenta
- 1996: El amor hecho canción, Magenta
- 1997: Como amiga, Magenta
- 1998: La cumbia de los negros, Eccosound
- 2000: Por siempre
- 2010: Calidad sin fronteras
- 2018: Corazón Amazónico

Compilation albums

- 1976: Cumbia De Los Pajaritos
- 1978: Cumbia Amazónica
- 1980: Lo Mejor de los Mirlos (Vol. 1), Infopesa
- 1980: Cumbia Amazónica vol. 2
- 1982: Lo Mejor de los Mirlos (Vol. 2), Infopesa
- 1994: 15 Grandes Éxitos, Música & Marketing
- 2014: Cumbia Amazónica, 1972-1980 14 Éxitos, Infopesa

Singles

- 1982: Tiro al blanco, Infopesa
- 1995: Enamorado, Magenta
