= Los Shapis =

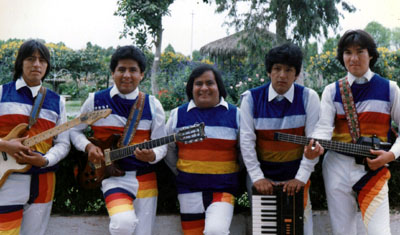
- Los Shapis in 2006.

Background information
- Origin: Peru
- Genres: Chicha
- Years active: 1981–present

Los Shapis is a chicha musical group from Peru. They rose to prominence with their 1981 hit song "El Aguajal" (which means "the swamp"), a modern adaptation of traditional huayno. They were noted for their rainbow coloured costumes. The band's logo was designed by Rafael Trujillo Villacorta.

Los Shapis was one of the first chicha groups.
