= Peruvian cumbia =

Peruvian musical style

- Native name: Cumbia peruana
- Stylistic origins: Cumbia; Surf rock; Rock and Roll; Andean music; Psychedelic rock; Vals criollo
- Cultural origins: Late 1960s, Peru
- Typical instruments: Electric guitar; electronic organ; percussion; güiro; maraca; electronic keyboard; electric bass; timbales; synthesizer
- Derivative forms: Cumbia villera, New Chilean cumbia

Peruvian cumbia (Spanish: Cumbia Peruana) is a subgenre of cumbia that became popular in the coastal cities of Peru, mainly in Lima in the 1960s through the fusion of local versions of the original Colombian genre, traditional highland huayno, and elements of traditional rhythms from the coast, highlands, and the jungle of Peru, and Rock music, particularly Rock & roll, Surf rock and Psychedelic rock.

Unlike other styles of cumbia, the chicha subgenre's harmonics are based on the pentatonic scale typical of Andean music. It is played with keyboards or synthesizers and up to three electric guitars that can play simultaneous melodies, an element derived from the harp and guitar lines of Andean huayno. The rhythmic electric guitar in chicha is played with upstrokes, following patterns derived from Peruvian coastal creole waltz. Chicha songs contain electric guitar solos, following the rock music tradition.

== Origins and development ==
Chicha started out in the 1960s in the oil-boom cities of the Peruvian Amazon. Loosely inspired by Colombian cumbia, it incorporated the distinctive pentatonic scales of Andean melodies, Cuban percussion, and the psychedelic sounds of surf guitars, wah-wah pedals and combo organs or Moog synthesizers. Chicha absorbed elements of the music of the Amazonian regions of Peru and the use of the Farfisa electronic organ through Amazonian bands like Juaneco y Su Combo. Chicha, which is named after a corn-based liquor favored by the Incas, quickly spread to Lima. It became the music of choice of the mostly indigenous new migrant population. By the mid-1980s it had become the most widespread urban music in Peru.

The first chicha hit, and the song from which the movement has taken its name, was "La Chichera" (The Chicha Seller) by Los Demonios del Mantaro (The Devils of Mantaro), who hailed from the central highlands of Junin. The band Los Destellos, formed in Lima in 1966, brought electric guitars to chicha and consolidated its characteristic features by integrating in it elements of Peruvian Andean folklore, Peruvian creole waltz, Cuban music and rock music. Other bands, such as Los Mirlos, Los Ecos, and Los Diablos Rojos were highly influenced by this style.

During the 1980s the Amerindian immigrants to coastal cities that nurtured the subgenre became working and middle class individuals and a market for chicha commercial radio. The Pharaoh of Cumbia, Chacalon, became one of the most popular chicha artists through his hit "Soy provinciano" (I am from the province) and vibrant concerts. Another famous band in the 1980s were Los Shapis, a provincial group established by their 1981 hit "El Aguajal" (The Swamp), a version of a traditional huayno.

The strong influence of Mexican tecnocumbia became evident on the evolution of Peruvian cumbia in the 1990s. Efforts by Argentina-based Grupo Néctar and others gave it regional recognition. Its decline during the late 1990s was followed by a revival that began in 2007, mainly thanks to the rising popularity of Tongo.

== Lyrics ==
While most lyrics are about love in all its aspects, nearly all songs reveal an aspect of the harshness of the Amerindian experience - displacement, hardship, loneliness and exploitation. Many songs relate to the great majority of people who have to make a living selling their labour and goods in the unofficial "informal economy", ever threatened by the police.

Current exposure of all social classes of Peru to chicha as well as a renovation in lyrical content, to include expressions of animation have led to its revival.

== Musical instruments ==
Unlike traditional cumbia from Colombia, Peruvian chicha bands feature electric lead and rhythm guitars, electric bass, electric organ, electronic percussion and synthesizer. There are one or more vocalists who may simultaneously play percussion plus timbales and conga players. There are no accordions nor woodwinds.

Electric guitars make extensive use of the fuzzbox and the wah-wah pedal following the influence of psychedelic rock and surf rock in chicha.

The influence of Salsa has seen the recent inclusion of wind instruments in some Peruvian cumbia bands.

== Resurgence and Chicha the dance ==
Chicha, the music, has had a small resurgence thanks to projects started in United States. One example is a group known as Money Chicha based in Austin, Texas which is a new project from the founders of Grupo Fantasma. Also noteworthy is Chicha Dust from Tucson, Arizona (now rebranded as the stylized "XIXA"). Likely none of this would have been possible without the release of compilation records "The Roots of Chicha" volumes one and two by Barbes Records, out of Brooklyn, NY in 2007 and 2010 respectively. The performances of Money Chicha and similar bands in Austin - a city with a vibrant dance scene - has led to the development of a distinct dance form with the same name. Chicha the dance takes elements of Mambo (a.k.a. Salsa On2), Sensual Bachata, and other Latin dance forms. Chicha dance is distinctly different from cumbia dance and is not inherently compatible, although chicha can also be danced to all other types of Cumbia music.
