= Benny Benassi discography =

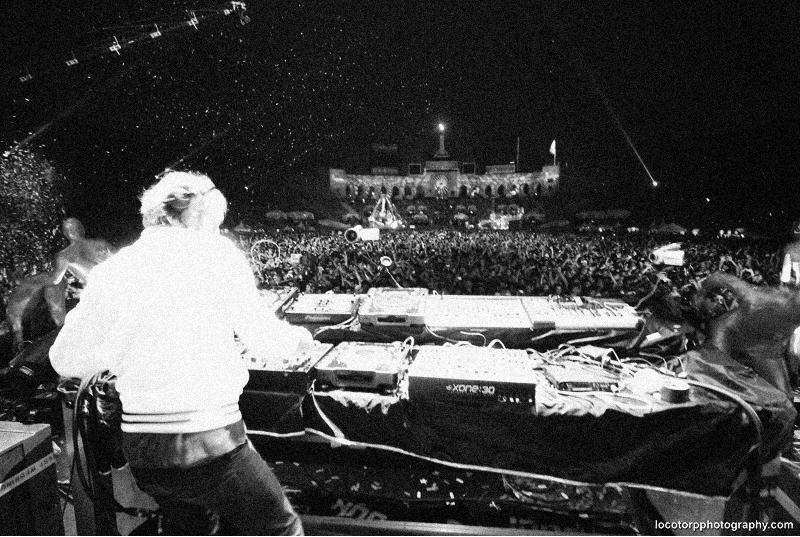
- Benny Benassi at Electric Daisy Carnival 2009
- Studio albums: 4
- Compilation albums: 6
- Singles: 29
- Remix albums: 2
- Remixes: 24

This is a discography of the Italian DJ and producer Benny Benassi.

== Albums ==
=== Studio albums ===
- 2003: Hypnotica
- 2008: Rock 'n' Rave
- 2011: Electroman
- 2016: Danceaholic
- 2026: Feel the Bass

=== Compilation albums ===
- 2003: DJ Set 1
- 2004: Subliminal Sessions 6
- 2004: Re-Sfaction
- 2005: The Gallery: Live Sessions (with Tall Paul)
- 2005: Cooking for Pump-Kin: Phase One
- 2006: Re-Sfaction 2
- 2006: Best of Benny Benassi
- 2007: Cooking for Pump-Kin: Special Menu
- 2009: Toolroom Knights

== Singles ==
=== As lead artist ===
List of singles as lead artist, with selected chart positions, showing year released and album name
Title	Year	Peak chart positions										Certifications	Album
Title	Year	AUS	BEL	DEN	FRA	GER	GRE	NLD	NZ	SWI	UK	Certifications	Album
"Satisfaction"	2002	10	4	17	4	38	8	10	—	44	2	BPI: Gold; ARIA: Gold	Hypnotica
"Able to Love"	2003	52	24	—	18	51	19	33	—	91	179		Hypnotica
"No Matter What You Do"	2003	—	—	—	44	69	—	—	—	89	40		Hypnotica
"Love Is Gonna Save Us"	2003	—	19	—	35	—	—	52	—	—	—		Hypnotica
"Who's Your Daddy?"	2005	—	59	—	—	—	—	59	—	—	—		Non-album single
"I Am Not Drunk"	2008	—	—	—	—	—	—	—	—	—	—		Rock 'n' Rave
"Come Fly Away" (featuring Channing)	2009	—	—	—	—	—	—	54	—	—	—		Rock 'n' Rave
"Spaceship" (featuring Kelis, apl.de.ap and Jean-Baptiste)	2010	—	77	—	16	—	—	—	—	—	94		Electroman
"House Music"	2010	—	—	—	—	—	—	—	—	—	—		Electroman
"Electroman" (featuring T-Pain)	2011	—	—	—	—	—	—	—	—	—	—		Electroman
"Cinema" (featuring Gary Go)	2011	26	57	—	—	—	—	49	13	—	20	BPI: Gold	Electroman
"Close to Me" (featuring Gary Go)	2011	—	114	—	—	—	—	—	—	—	—		Electroman
"Control" (featuring Gary Go)	2012	—	—	—	—	—	—	—	—	—	—		Electroman
"Ghost" (with Pink Is Punk featuring Bright Lights)	2013	—	—	—	—	—	—	—	—	—	—		Non-album single
"Dance the Pain Away" (featuring John Legend)	2013	—	—	—	—	—	—	—	—	—	—		Danceaholic
"Back to the Pump"	2014	—	—	—	—	—	—	—	—	—	—		Danceaholic
"Dope 427" (with Shinichi Osawa)	2014	—	—	—	—	—	—	—	—	—	—		Non-album singles
"Blink Again" (with John Dahlbäck)	2014	—	—	—	—	—	—	—	—	—	—		Non-album singles
"Shooting Helicopters" (featuring Serj Tankian)	2014	—	—	—	—	—	—	—	—	—	—		Danceaholic
"Gangsta" (with Moguai)	2014	—	—	—	—	—	—	—	—	—	—		Danceaholic
"Aphrodisiak" (with Chris Nasty)	2015	—	—	—	—	—	—	—	—	—	—		Non-album single
"I Wanna Be Disco" (with Chicco Secci featuring Bonnie Calean)	2015	—	—	—	—	—	—	—	—	—	—		Danceaholic
"Who I Am" (with Marc Benjamin featuring Christian Burns)	2015	—	—	—	—	—	—	—	—	—	—		Danceaholic
"Even If" (with Vassy)	2016	—	—	—	—	—	—	—	—	—	—		Danceaholic
"Beardo"	2016	—	—	—	—	—	—	—	—	—	—		Danceaholic
"Paradise" (with Chris Brown)	2016	—	71	—	—	—	—	—	—	—	40	BPI: Silver	Danceaholic
"We Light Forever Up" (with Lush & Simon featuring Frederick)	2017	—	—	—	—	—	—	—	—	—	—		Non-album singles
"2 My House" (with Chris Nasty)	2017	—	—	—	—	—	—	—	—	—	—		Non-album singles
"Everybody Needs A Kiss" (with Sofi Tukker)	2018	—	—	—	—	—	—	—	—	—	—		Non-album singles
"Inside" (with Chris Nasty)	2019	—	—	—	—	—	—	—	—	—	—		Non-album singles
"Lonely Nights" (featuring Lil Yachty)	2019	—	—	—	—	—	—	—	—	—	—		Non-album singles
"I'll Be Your Friend" (with CeCe Rogers)	2020	—	—	—	—	—	—	—	—	—	—		Non-album singles
"Lovelife" (with Jeremih)	2020	—	—	—	—	—	—	—	—	—	—		Non-album singles
"Let Me Go" (featuring Ne-Yo)	2021	—	—	—	—	—	—	—	—	—	—		Non-album singles
"M.I.A" (with Emma Muscat)	2023	—	—	—	—	—	—	—	—	—	—		Non-album singles
"Feel the Bass"	2025	—	—	—	—	—	—	—	—	—	—		Feel the Bass
"—" denotes a recording that did not chart or was not released in that territory.

=== As featured artist ===
List of singles as featured artist, with selected chart positions and certifications, showing year released and album name
Title	Year	Peak chart positions										Certifications	Album
Title	Year	AUS	BEL	DEN	FRA	GER	NLD	SWE	SWI	UK	US	Certifications	Album
"Beautiful People" (Chris Brown featuring Benny Benassi)	2011	7	19	11	26	30	25	46	26	4	43	ARIA: 2× Platinum; BPI: 2× Platinum; DEN: Gold; GLF: Platinum; RMNZ: Gold	F.A.M.E.

== Remixes ==
=== 2003 ===
- Alizée – "I'm Not Twenty" (Benny Banassi Remix)

=== 2004 ===
- The Mamas and The Papas – "California Dreaming 2004" (Benny Benassi Remix)
- Mylène Farmer – Pardonne-moi (Benny Benassi Sfaction Club Remix)

=== 2006 ===
- Faithless – "Bombs" (Benny Benassi Remix)

=== 2007 ===
- Sean Callery – "24 Theme" (Benny Benassi Lifesucks Remix)

=== 2008 ===
- Jordin Sparks and Chris Brown – "No Air" (Benny Benassi Pump-Kin Remix)
- Lisa Miskovsky – "Still Alive" (Benny Benassi Remix)

=== 2009 ===
- Flo Rida featuring Akon – "Available" (Benny Benassi Remix)
- Madonna – "Celebration" (Benny Benassi Remix)
- Honorebel featuring Pitbull and Jump Smokers – "Now You See It (Shake That Ass)" (Benny Benassi Remix)

=== 2010 ===
- Kelis – "Acapella" (Benny Benassi Remix)
- will.i.am and Nicki Minaj – "Check It Out" (Benny Benassi Remix)
- Shakira – "Did It Again" (Benny Benassi Remix)
- Tiësto – "I Will Be Here" (Benny Benassi Dub Remix)
- Example – "Last Ones Standing" (Benny Benassi Remix)
- Alesha Dixon – Drummer Boy (Benny Benassi Remix)

=== 2011 ===
- Enrique Iglesias featuring Pitbull and The WAV.s – "I Like How It Feels" (Benny Benassi Radio Edit)
- Avril Lavigne – "What The Hell" (Benny Benassi Remix)
- Katy Perry – "E.T." (Benny Benassi Club Instrumental)
- Britney Spears – "Womanizer" (Benny Benassi Extended)
- LMFAO – "Party Rock Anthem" (Benny Benassi Radio Edit)
- Labrinth – "Earthquake" (Benny Benassi Remix)
- Laidback Luke vs. Example – "Natural Disaster" (Benny Benassi Remix)
- Florence + The Machine – "Shake It Out" (Benny Benassi Remix)

=== 2012 ===
- Adam Lambert – "Trespassing" (Benny Benassi Remix)
- Calvin Harris – "Feel So Close" (Benny Benassi Remix)
- Marina and the Diamonds – "Primadonna" (Benny Benassi Remix)
- The Rolling Stones – "Doom & Gloom" (Benny Benassi Remix)

=== 2013 ===
- Mika – "Stardust" (Benny Benassi Mix)
- John Legend – "Made To Love" (Benny Benassi Remix)
- Dido – "No Freedom" (Benny Benassi Remix)
- Alex Gaudino featuring Jordin Sparks – "Is This Love" (Benny Benassi Remix)

=== 2014 ===
- Chromeo – "Jealous" (Benny Benassi Remix)
- Daddy's Groove featuring Teammate – "Pulse" (Benny Benassi Remix)
- Daft Punk – "The Grid" (Benny Benassi Remix)

=== 2015 ===
- Leona Lewis – "Fire Under My Feet" (Benny Benassi Remix)
- Giorgio Moroder featuring Sia – "Déjà Vu" (Benny Benassi Club Remix)
- Lincoln Jesser – "In My Place" (Benny Benassi Remix)

=== 2016 ===
- 19eighty7 – "Get On It" (Benny Benassi and Mazzz Remix)
- Tiga – "Make Me Fall In Love" (Benny Benassi Remix)

=== 2017 ===
- Francesco Gabbani – "Occidentali's Karma" (Benny Benassi and Mazzz Remix)
- Bruno Martini – "Living On The Outside" (Benny Benassi and Mazzz Remix)
- Christian Hudson – "Four Leaf Clover" (Benny Benassi Remix)
- Sofi Tukker – "Fuck They" (Benny Benassi and Mazzz Remix)
- Crystal Fighters – "Yellow Sun" (Benny Benassi Remix)
- The Script – "Arms Open" (Benny Benassi, Mazzz and Rivaz Remix)
- Jack Savoretti – "Whiskey Tango" (Benny Benassi and Mazzz Remix)

=== 2018 ===
- Fischerspooner – "TopBrazil" (Benny Benassi, Constantin and Mazzz Remix)
- Yxng Bane – "Vroom" (Benny Benassi Remix)
- Janet Jackson and Daddy Yankee – "Made for Now" (Benny Benassi and Canova Remix)

=== 2019 ===
- Adriano Celentano – "I Want to Know" (Benny Benassi Remix)
- The Prince Karma – "Later Bitches" (Benny Benassi, Mazzz and Constantin Remix)
- Deorro – "Wild Like the Wind" (Benny Benassi and DJ Licious Remix)
- Patrick Martin – "Stranger Nights" (Benny Benassi Remix)
- Sigala and Becky Hill – "Wish You Well" (Benny Benassi Remix)
- Tiësto, Jonas Blue and Rita Ora – "Ritual" (Benny Benassi and B.B. Team Remix)
- Madonna featuring Swae Lee – "Crave" (Benny Benassi and B.B. Team Remix)
- Sean Paul – "When It Comes To You" (Benny Benassi and B.B. Team Remix)

=== 2020 ===
- Low Steppa featuring Reigns – "Wanna Show You" (Benny Benassi and B.B. Team Remix)

=== 2021 ===
- Becky Hill and David Guetta – "Remember" (Benny Benassi Remix)
- David Solomon featuring Ryan Tedder – "Learn To Love Me" (Benny Benassi Remix)

=== 2022 ===
- Telykast and Sam Grey - "Unbreakable" (Benny Benassi Remix)
- Twice – "The Feels" (Benny Benassi Remix)

== With Benassi Bros. ==
- Pumphonia (2004)
- ...Phobia (2005)
