= No Matter What You Do =

- UK CD single

Single by Benny Benassi Presents the Biz

from the album Hypnotica
- Released: 2003
- Length: 2:35 (radio edit); 5:09 (original mix); 4:07 (album version)
- Label: Ministry of Sound
- Songwriters: Alle Benassi; Marco Benassi; Daniela Galli
- Producer: Larry Pignagnoli

Benny Benassi singles chronology
"Able to Love" (2003)	"No Matter What You Do" (2003)	"Love Is Gonna Save Us" (2004)

"No Matter What You Do" is a song by Italian DJ Benny Benassi released in his 2003 album Hypnotica. Like "Satisfaction", it uses a female speech synthesizers in the vocals.

== Charts ==
Chart performance for "No Matter What You Do"
Chart (2003–2004)	Peak position
France (SNEP)	44
Germany (GfK)	69
Ireland (IRMA)	33
UK Singles (OCC)	40
