= J.K. (singer) =

- Born: Marta Simlat; 2 January 1970 (age 56); Kraków, Poland
- Origin: Italy
- Genres: Eurodance
- Occupations: Singer, model
- Instrument: Vocals
- Years active: 1992–2004, 2024–present

Marta Simlat (born 2 January 1970) is a Polish model best known for fronting the Eurodance project J.K., who enjoyed moderate success in the mid- to late-1990s with the Italian producers Larry Pignagnoli and Davide Riva.

== Musical career ==
Simlat moved from Poland to Italy in 1992 to pursue a modelling career. However, shortly after her move she was spotted by Larry Pignagnoli and Davide Riva, the production team behind Whigfield. Simlat was quickly signed and her first single, "You Make Me Feel Good" performed well in France, Italy and Germany and topped the dance charts in Canada.

Her third single, "You and I", climbed to the top position on the Canadian dance charts and obtained strong airplay in continental Europe. The track was also used on many dance compilation albums around the globe, including Muchmusic's Dance Mix '95 and the Eurodisco '96 - Collection. A fourth single, "My Radio", performed well in Europe and also became popular in Japan.

At the height of her popularity in 1996, there were rumors circulating that Marta Simlat was not the one performing the vocals on any of the songs, as she only lip-synched in live performances and the music videos, and didn't speak English at the time. It is now known that the vocals for J.K. were performed by Giovanna Bersola, Sandy Chambers and Zeitia Massiah, the former two of these vocalists were also the studio vocalists behind Corona's biggest hits in the 90s.

Between 1998 and 1999, several other singles followed to lesser success. After her last official single, "You Got Me Dancing" in 2000, Simlat left the J.K. project and disappeared from the public eye. Despite her departure, there were still three singles that were released under J.K. between 2001 and 2004, which the Benassi Bros made cover versions of two of these songs with the vocalist Dhany in 2005, "Hit My Heart" and "Make Me Feel".

After over 20 years of silence, in December 2023, it was revealed that Simlat would be returning to the stage as J.K. for 90s nostalgia concerts and festivals. Her first comeback performance was held on 9 March 2024 in Manaus, Brazil. Since returning to the eurodance scene, Marta Simlat has been performing all of the J.K. songs with her actual voice.

== Discography ==
=== Albums ===
Sweet Lady Night (The Special Edition) (1996)

=== Singles ===
| Year | Single | Peak chart positions | | Album |
| Year | Single | CAN Dance | FRA | Album |
|---|---|---|---|---|
| 1992 | "You Make Me Feel Good" | 1 | — | Singles only |
| 1994 | "Beat It" | — | — | Singles only |
| 1994 | "You & I" | 1 | 47 | Singles only |
| 1995 | "My Radio" | 1 | — | Singles only |
| 1996 | "Sweet Lady Night" | — | — | Singles only |
| 1998 | "Go On" | 6 | — | Singles only |
| 1999 | "Deep in the Night" | — | — | Singles only |
| 2000 | "You Got Me Dancing" | — | — | Singles only |
| 2001 | "Make Me Feel" | — | — | Singles only |
| 2002 | "Hit My Heart" | — | — | Singles only |
| 2004 | "River Runs Dry" | — | — | Singles only |
"—" denotes releases that did not chart
