= Electroman (album) =

Studio album by Benny Benassi
- Released: 7 June 2011
- Genre: Progressive house; electro house; dance-pop; house; trance; R&B
- Label: Ultra
- Producer: Benny Benassi; Young Fyre

Benny Benassi chronology
Rock 'n' Rave (2008)	Electroman (2011)	Danceaholic (2016)

Singles from Electroman
- 1. "Spaceship" Released: 25 May 2010; 2. "House Music" Released: 23 November 2010; 3. "Electroman" Released: 29 January 2011; 4. "Cinema" Released: 8 March 2011; 5. "Close to Me" Released: 8 November 2011; 6. "Control" Released: 28 February 2012

Electroman is the third studio album by Italian DJ and record producer Benny Benassi. It was released on 7 June 2011, through Ultra Music.

== Singles ==
- "Spaceship" was released on iTunes on 25 May 2010. The single features American singer Kelis, Black Eyed Peas rapper apl.de.ap, and Jean-Baptiste. The music video premiered on Vevo on 28 June 2010. It was directed by Ray Kay and features all artists. It peaked on the UK Dance Chart at number 18.
- "House Music" was released on 23 November 2010 to iTunes. The track was used as a B-side to "Spaceship" in the UK.
- "Electroman" (featuring T-Pain) was released on 29 January 2011 as the third single. The music video was released four days earlier. It contains elements of "Electroboy" by The Mighty Boosh.
- Although not released as a single, "Beautiful People" (a collaboration with Chris Brown) was included on the album. The track was an international hit, topping the US Hot Dance Club Songs chart, and became a top 10 hit in Australia, Ireland, New Zealand, Scotland and the UK. It was also a top 40 hit across other European countries.
- "Cinema" (featuring Gary Go) was released on 8 March 2011. The video premiered on 28 March 2011. It was released on 24 July 2011 in the UK. It debuted on the UK Singles Chart at number 53, and peaked at number 20. It debuted at number 13 on the UK Dance Chart, peaking later at number six. It debuted at number 34 in Scotland and later peaked at number 14.
- "Close to Me" (featuring Gary Go) was the fifth single and was released on 8 November 2011. Video premiere was released on 11 November 2011.
- "Control" (featuring Gary Go) was the sixth single and was released on 28 February 2012.

== Track listing ==
No.	Title	Writer(s)	Length
1.	"Good Girl"	Alle Benassi; Marco Benassi	3:40
2.	"Rather Be" (featuring Shanell)	Alle Benassi; Marco Benassi; Shanell Woodgett	3:42
3.	"Spaceship" (featuring Kelis, apl.de.ap and Jean-Baptiste)	Alle Benassi; Marco Benassi; Allan Apll Pineda; Jean-Baptiste Kouame; Kelis Jones-Rogers; Michael McHenry	3:04
4.	"Beautiful People" (Chris Brown featuring Benny Benassi)	Alle Benassi; Marco Benassi; Jean-Baptiste Kouame; Chris Brown	3:45
5.	"My House" (featuring Jean-Baptiste)	Alle Benassi; Marco Benassi; Jean-Baptiste Kouame	3:28
6.	"House Music"	Alle Benassi; Marco Benassi	4:02
7.	"Cinema" (featuring Gary Go)	Alle Benassi; Marco Benassi; Gary Baker	3:04
8.	"Electroman" (featuring T-Pain)	Alle Benassi; Marco Benassi; Faheem Rasheed Najm; Julian Barratt; Noel Fielding; Tremaine Winfrey	3:16
9.	"Automatic B"	Alle Benassi; Marco Benassi	4:01
10.	"Control" (featuring Gary Go)	Alle Benassi; Marco Benassi; Gary Baker	3:29
11.	"Leave This Club Alone" (featuring Dhany)	Alle Benassi; Marco Benassi; Gary Baker; Luke Pickett	3:34
12.	"Close to Me" (featuring Gary Go)	Alle Benassi; Marco Benassi; Gary Baker	3:21
13.	"Cinema" (featuring Gary Go) (Skrillex Remix)	Alle Benassi; Marco Benassi; Gary Baker	5:07
14.	"All the Way" (featuring Ying Yang Twins) (Live)	Alle Benassi; Marco Benassi; De'Angelo Holmes; Eric Jackson	3:34
15.	"Put It On Me (Bonus Track)" (featuring Pitbull)	Alle Benassi; Marco Benassi; Armando Christian Perez	3:27
16.	"Electroman" (John Dahlbäck Instrumental)	Alle Benassi; Marco Benassi; John Dahlbäck	5:18
17.	"Dub Rain (Bonus Track)"	Alle Benassi	3:43

== Release history ==
Region	Format	Release
France	Digital download	6 June 2011
United States	CD; digital download	6 June 2011
Germany	CD	7 June 2011
Italy	CD; digital download	28 June 2011
