= Cooking for Pump-Kin: Phase One =

Cooking For Pump-Kin Phase 1

Compilation album by Benny Benassi
- Released: 2005
- Genre: Electro, house
- Length: 68:59
- Label: Pump-Kin Music
- Producer: Benny Benassi

Benny Benassi chronology
Gallery Session (2005)	Cooking For Pump-Kin Phase 1 (2005)	Cooking for Pump-Kin: Special Menu (2007)

Cooking For Pump-Kin Phase 1 is a compilation album by Euro house DJ/producer Benny Benassi. In 2005, it was released for the launch of his new label.

== Track listing ==
1. Zdar - "Don't You Want" (Tiga Remix) – 4:56
2. Digitalism - "Zdarlight" (Voyage Mix) – 4:46
3. Silvercity - "Galactic Ride" (2020 Soundsystem Re-Edit) – 5:26
4. Les Visiteurs featuring Tommie Sunshine - "Time Slide By" – 5:07
5. Moonbootica - "Listen" (Chab Remix) – 4:38
6. Scanty 88 - "Flashback" – 5:16
7. Looseheadz - "No Fun" – 4:48
8. Thomas Andersson - "Washing Up" – 4:30
9. Sikk - "My Washing Machine" – 5:00
10. Mathias Schaffhauser - "Coincidance" – 5:31
11. Francesco Farfa - "Acidazzo" – 5:00
12. Bellone - "Magnetic" – 4:27
13. Mario Plu - "I Don't Want To Come Back" – 4:48
14. Cajuan - "Dance/Not Dance" – 4:46
