= My Body =

My Body may refer to:

== Songs ==
- "My Body" (Hadise song)
- "My Body" (LSG song)
- "My Body" (Paloma Faith song)
- "My Body" (Young the Giant song)
- "My Body", a Benny Benassi song featuring Mia J. from Rock 'n' Rave
- "My Body", a song by Stephanie Mills from Merciless, 1983
- "My Body", a song by Coi Leray from Coi, 2023
- "On My Body", a song by Tyla and Becky G from Tyla, 2024

== Other ==
- My Body, a 2021 essay collection by Emily Ratajkowski
