= Toolroom Knights =

Toolroom Knights may refer to:

- Toolroom Knights (Benny Benassi album)
- Toolroom Knights (Gabriel & Dresden album)
