= Best of Benassi Bros. =

Album by Benassi Bros.

Greatest hits album by Benassi Bros.
- Released: 2005
- Genres: Electro, Techno

Benassi Bros. chronology
Best of Benassi Bros. (2005)

Best of Benassi Bros. is a best of/greatest hits album released by Benassi Bros in 2005. There are two versions of the album, one released in France and the other released in Germany a year later.

== 2005 Track listing ==
#	Artist	Featuring	Title	Version	Length
1.	Benassi Bros.	Dhany	Rocket In The Sky	Original Extended Mix	5:43
2.	Benassi Bros.	Sandy	Illusion	Sfaction Mix	5:08
3.	Benassi Bros.	Dhany	Every Single Day	Original Version	4:45
4.	Benassi Bros.	Sandy	Castaway	Original Version	6:06
5.	Benassi Bros.	Dhany	Make Me Feel	Original Version	5:30
6.	Benassi Bros.	Sandy	I Feel So Fine	Sfaction Mix	5:26
7.	Benassi Bros.	Dhany	Run To Me	Sfaction Version	5:09
8.	Benassi Bros.	Sandy	Get Better	Sflow Version	4:05
9.	Benassi Bros.	Dhany	Hit My Heart	Sfaction Mix	5:08
10.	Benassi Bros.	Sandy	Turn Me Up	Sfaction Mix	5:48
11.	Benassi Bros.	Dhany	Somebody To Touch Me	Sflow Version	5:49
12.	Benassi Bros.	Sandy	Light	Original Version	7:30
13.	Benassi Bros.		Megamix		3:31
14.	Benassi Bros.		Summer Megamix 2005		4:11
15.	Benassi Bros.	Dhany	Make Me Feel	Dave Leatherman Remix	4:11

Best of Benassi Bros.

Greatest hits album by Benassi Bros.
- Released: 2006
- Genres: Electro, house

Benassi chronology
Best of Benassi Bros. (2006)

== 2006 Track listing ==
#	Artist	Featuring	Title	Version	Length
1.	Benassi Bros.	Sandy	Illusion	Sfaction Mix	5:09
2.	Benassi Bros.	Paul French	Memory of Love	Original Version	5:29
3.	Benassi Bros.	Dhany	Make Me Feel	Original Version	5:31
4.	Benassi Bros.	Paul French	Don't Touch Too Much	Original Version	5:32
5.	Benassi Bros.	Sandy	Feel Alive	Original Extended	5:37
6.	Benassi Bros.	Sandy	I Feel So Fine	Sfaction Mix	5:24
7.	Benassi Bros.	Dhany	Rocket in the Sky	Radio Edit	4:00
8.	Benassi Bros.	Dhany	Every Single Day	Original Version	4:46
9.	Benassi Bros.	Sandy	Turn Me Up	Sfaction Mix	5:49
10.	Benassi Bros.	Dhany	Hit My Heart	Radio Edit	3:16
11.	Benassi Bros.	Sandy	Castaway	Original Version	6:06
12.	Benassi Bros.	Sandy	Get Better	Sfaction Reloaded Mix	5:34
13.	Benassi Bros.	Violeta	I Love My Sex	Sfactrum Version	3:13
14.	Benassi Bros.	Alle	Ride to Be My Girl	Original Version	4:38
