= Men in the City =

- Theatrical release poster
- Directed by: Simon Verhoeven
- Screenplay by: Simon Verhoeven
- Produced by: Quirin Berg; Max Wiedemann
- Starring: Christian Ulmen; Nadja Uhl; Wotan Wilke Möhring
- Cinematography: Jo Heim
- Edited by: Stefan Essl
- Music by: Simon Verhoeven; Wolfgang Hammerschmid; Rufus Martin
- Production company: Wiedemann & Berg Film Production
- Distributed by: Warner Bros. Pictures
- Release date: 8 October 2009
- Running time: 107 minutes
- Country: Germany
- Language: German
- Box office: $22 million

Men in the City (German: Männerherzen; literally "Men's Hearts") is a 2009 German comedy film directed by Simon Verhoeven with Christian Ulmen, Nadja Uhl and Wotan Wilke Möhring. The film was followed by Men in the City 2 in 2011.

== Plot ==
Five men attend the same gym in Berlin. None of them seem to have anything in common, but all five have not enough confidence to meet or develop relationships with the opposite sex, and what it really means to be a man or what women expect of them. Günther Stobanski (Christian Ulmen) fails with Internet dating, music producer Jerome Ades (Til Schweiger) passes from a sentimental break-up story to another. Train driver Roland Feldberg (Wotan Wilke Möhring) snubs his wife Susanne Feldberg (Nadja Uhl). The girlfriend of Philip Henrion (Maxim Mehmet) becomes pregnant at a young age. Niklas Michalke (Florian David Fitz) is terrified by his impending marriage, while the singer Bruce Berger (Justus von Dohnányi) tries to pursue his singing career.

== Cast ==
- Christian Ulmen as Günther Stobanski
- Wotan Wilke Möhring as Roland Feldberg, a railroad engineer
- Nadja Uhl as Susanne Feldberg, Roland's wife
- Til Schweiger as Jerome Ades, a music producer
- Maxim Mehmet as Philip Henrion
- Florian David Fitz as Niklas Michalke
- Jana Pallaske as Nina Hellmich
- Justus von Dohnányi as Bruce Berger, a singer
- Inez Bjørg David as Maria Hellström
- Liane Forestieri as Laura Sandner
- Fritz Karl as Martin
- Fahri Yardım as Loco
- Palina Rojinski as Sabrina Silver
- Birge Schade as Pflegerin Beate
- Carl Heinz Choynski as Vater Feldberg
- Bastian Pastewka as Father
- Dennis Gansel as Lars

== Production ==
Men in the city was financed by Medienboard Berlin-Brandenburg GmbH Film and German Federal Film Board Film Financier, and filmed in Berlin, Germany.

Writing and production credits

- Simon Verhoeven – film director and screenwriter
- Jo Heim – director of photography
- Quirin Berg – film producer
- Max Wiedemann – film producer
- Stefan Essl – editor
- Silke Faber – costume designer
- Thomas Stammer – production designer
- Anja Dihrberg – casting
- Wiedemann & Berg Filmproduktion Gmbh & Co. kg – production company
- Warner Bros. Pictures Germany – film studio

== Themes ==
The main theme of the film is the search for love and happiness, and the fear of being alone, but love is a battlefield and it's worth fighting for the woman you love.

== Music and soundtrack ==
Männerherzen

Soundtrack album by Various artists
- Released: 2009
- Recorded: 2009
- Genre: Pop rock

The film score and the soundtrack album for Men in the City was produced by Simon Verhoeven and was released on 9 October 2009 through Universal Music. Verhoeven wrote and recorded the album together with the lead singer of the band Marshmellow Club, Rufus Martin. Simon Verhoeven and Wolfgang Hammerschmid were responsible for the film score's composition and orchestration that involved about twenty musicians.

The main theme song, "Wonderful", was written by British pop rock singer and songwriter Gary Go in January 2009 and released on 16 February 2009, as the first and debut single from his self-titled debut studio album. The single reached the Top 40 of the British, German and Austrian music charts. Its music video was filmed on a Berlin rooftop and includes scenes from the film. Go also contributed to the song "Berlin" with a reinterpretation of his song "Brooklyn", featured on his debut album. BRIT Award-winning English singer-songwriter and guitarist James Morrison wrote and composed the song "Watch and Wait".

=== Track listing ===
No.	Title	Writer(s)	Performer	Length
1.	"Wonderful"	Gary Baker	Gary Go
2.	"This Feeling"	Simon Verhoeven, Wolfgang Hammerschmid, Rufus Martin	Marshmellow Club
3.	"If You'll Be Mine" (originally from the 1998 album There's Something Going On)	Stephen Jones	Babybird
4.	"In the City"	Verhoeven, Hammerschmid, Martin	Marshmellow Club
5.	"North Bergin Avenue (Intro)"	Verhoeven, Hammerschmid	Simon Verhoeven, Wolfgang Hammerschmid
6.	"North Bergin Avenue"	Verhoeven, Hammerschmid, Martin	Marshmellow Club
7.	"Get Sexy"	Philip Lawrence, Ari Levine, Bruno Mars, Fred Fairbrass, Richard Fairbrass, Rob Manzoli	Sugababes
8.	"Choking on a Marshmallow"	Verhoeven, Hammerschmid, Martin	Marshmellow Club
9.	"Berlin"	Gary Bajer	Gary Go
10.	"Watch and Wait"	James Morrison	James Morrison
11.	"Don't Wanna Feel This Way"	Verhoeven, Hammerschmid, Martin	Marshmellow Club
12.	"Love Theme"	Verhoeven, Hammerschmid, Martin	Marshmellow Club
13.	"The Good Old Days" (originally from the 2003 album Shootenanny!)	E	Eels
14.	"Down in History"	Verhoeven, Hammerschmid, Martin	Marshmellow Club
15.	"Stars in Your Head"		Jerome Isma-Ae
16.	"Choking on a Marshmallow (Original Version)"	Verhoeven, Hammerschmid, Martin	Marshmellow Club
17.	"Tat Twam Asi"		Beathotel
18.	"I Need Music"	Verhoeven, Hammerschmid, Martin	Bruce Berger
19.	"Alle Kinder dieser Erde"	Verhoeven, Hammerschmid, Martin	Bruce Berger
20.	"Sag mir warum"	Verhoeven, Hammerschmid, Martin	Bruce Berger
21.	"Tommy's Theme"	Verhoeven, Hammerschmid	Simon Verhoeven, Wolfgang Hammerschmid
22.	"Nik's Return"	Verhoeven, Hammerschmid	Simon Verhoeven, Wolfgang Hammerschmid
23.	"Roland's Destiny"	Verhoeven, Hammerschmid	Simon Verhoeven, Wolfgang Hammerschmid

=== Charts ===
Männerherzen (soundtrack)
Year	Chart	Peak Position
2009	Austrian Album Chart	71

"Wonderful"
Year	Chart	Peak Position
2009	Austrian Singles Chart	39
2009	Italian Singles Chart	6
2009	German Media Control Singles Chart	40
2009	Swiss Singles Chart	70
2009	UK Singles Chart	25

== Release ==
Men in the city was first released in Austria, Germany, and Switzerland on 8 October 2009. The film was screened on 23 October 2010 at the Berlin & Beyond Film Festival in San Francisco, United States.

=== Home media ===
The DVD release of the film was premiered on 2 December 2010 in Russia.

=== Film distributors ===
- Ster-Kinekor – theatrical distributor
- Warner Bros. Pictures International – foreign theatrical distributor
- Independent Distributors – foreign theatrical distributor
- Beta Film – theatrical distribution sales
