= Able to Love =

- Digital and French CD single cover

Single by Benny Benassi

from the album Hypnotica
- Released: June 2003
- Length: 3:26
- Label: D:Vision
- Songwriter(s): Alle Benassi; Benny Benassi; Daniela Galli
- Producer(s): Alle Benassi; Benny Benassi; Larry Pignagnoli

Benny Benassi singles chronology
"Satisfaction" (2002)	"Able to Love" (2003)	"No Matter What You Do" (2003)

"Able to Love" is the second single by Italian DJ and producer Benny Benassi, from his album Hypnotica. It was released in June 2003 in order to promote the album's debut in August. At the time, the producing of the song took more than 6 months, as with "Satisfaction". The song remixes the main beat of "Satisfaction" and features vocals from Paul French and Violeta (a.k.a. The Biz).

== Charts ==
Chart performance for "Able to Love"
Chart (2003)	Peak position
Australia (ARIA)	52
Belgium (Ultratop 50 Flanders)	38
Belgium (Ultratop 50 Wallonia)	24
France (SNEP)	18
Germany (GfK)	51
Hungary (Dance Top 40)	5
Netherlands (Single Top 100)	33
Switzerland (Schweizer Hitparade)	91
