= Paradise (Benny Benassi and Chris Brown song) =

Single by Benny Benassi and Chris Brown

from the album Danceaholic
- Released: 31 March 2016
- Recorded: 2015
- Genre: Dance-pop; electro house; Europop
- Length: 3:53
- Label: Ultra
- Songwriters: Alessandro Benassi; Christopher Brown; Daniel Daley; Marco Benassi; Stephen Kozmeniuk
- Producers: Benny Benassi; Alle Benassi

Benny Benassi singles chronology
"Even If" (2016)	"Paradise" (2016)	"We Light Forever Up" (2017)

Chris Brown singles chronology
"Something New" (2016)	"Paradise" (2016)	"Drifting" (2016)

Music video
- "Paradise" on YouTube

"Paradise" is a song by Italian DJ Benny Benassi and American singer Chris Brown, released on 31 March 2016. It was released as a promotional single on August 20, 2015.

== Background ==
The song was written by Benassi, Brown, Daniel Daley, Alle Benassi and Stephen Kozmeniuk. Brown and Benassi had worked together for the first time on the song "Beautiful People" in 2010, and subsequently Benassi had produced another track for Brown, "Don't Wake Me Up", in 2012. After these collaborations Brown said in an interview for Billboard: "Benny and I have a history of making special music for the fans worldwide, and "Paradise" is another collaboration that I believe the fans will love and embrace".

In August 2015 Benassi has premiered a demo called "Paradise" on his SoundCloud page and removed it later. In March 2016 Brown had posted on his Instagram profile photos showing him and Benassi on the set for the video. After that Benassi has released the song on 31 March 2016.

== Music video ==
On 7 April 2016 Ultra Music uploaded the music video for "Paradise" on his YouTube account.

== Track listing ==
Digital download
No.	Title	Length
1.	"Paradise"	3:53

Digital download – Radio Edit
No.	Title	Length
1.	"Paradise" (Radio Edit)	3:53

== Charts ==
=== Weekly charts ===
Chart (2016)	Peak position
Belgium (Ultratip Bubbling Under Flanders)	21
Belgium Dance (Ultratop Flanders)	27
Belgium (Ultratip Bubbling Under Wallonia)	29
Ireland (IRMA)	30
Scottish Singles Sales (Official Charts)	15
Slovakia Airplay (ČNS IFPI)	70
UK Singles (Official Charts)	40
US Hot Dance/Electronic Songs (Billboard)	21
US Dance Airplay (Billboard)	15

=== Year-end charts ===
Chart (2016)	Position
US Hot Dance/Electronic Songs (Billboard)	83

== Certifications ==
Certifications for "Paradise "
Region	Certification	Certified units/sales
United Kingdom (BPI)	Silver	200,000^{‡}
^{‡} Sales+streaming figures based on certification alone.
