= Turn Me Up =

Turn Me Up may refer to:

- Turn Me Up!, a non-profit organization

== Music ==
- Turn Me Up, unreleased album by Katrina Elam

=== Songs ===
- "Turn Me Up", by Benassi Bros. from Pumphonia
- "Turn Me Up", by Carly Rae Jepsen from Kiss
- "Turn Me Up", by Cristal Snow
- "Turn Me Up", by Keith Barrow, 1979
- "Turn Me Up", by Steady Mobb'n featuring Snoop Dogg from Black Mafia
- "Turn Me Up", by Twin Shadow from Eclipse
