= The Gallery: Live Sessions =

Compilation album by Tall Paul and Benny Benassi
- Released: 2005
- Genre: Electro house
- Label: Vital
- Producer: Tall Paul, Benny Benassi

Tall Paul and Benny Benassi chronology
Subliminal Sessions 6 (2004)	The Gallery: Live Sessions (2005)	Cooking for Pump-Kin Phase One (2005)

The Gallery: Live Sessions is a collaborative compilation album mixed by Euro House DJ/producer Tall Paul and Benny Benassi. It was released in 2005 as a double disc album, the first disc being mixed by Tall Paul and the second disc being mixed by Benny Benassi.

== Track listing ==
=== Disc 1 (Tall Paul) ===
1. Tall Paul & Dave Aude - "Common Ground" – 6:30
2. Steve Lawler & Za Za La Boom - "Illectronic" – 4:50
3. Dave Spoon - "Who You Are" – 4:42
4. TDR - "Smoked Out" – 5:53
5. Deux - "Sun Rising Up" – 6:15
6. Erik E - "Ya Don't Stop" – 3:59
7. Tell Paul - "Got It" (Jark Prongo Remix & Original) – 3:43
8. Max Graham - "Time & Again" – 5:56
9. Gabriel & Dresden - "Arcadia " – 6:41
10. Pryda - "Human Behavior" – 5:55
11. Darren Christian & John Johnson - "Electrify" – 6:51
12. DT8 Project featuring Andrea Britton - "Winter" (Maxx Graham's Sidechain Remix) – 7:39

=== Disc 2 (Benny Benassi) ===
1. Chelonis R. Jones - "The Rush (Sex With Machines)" – 4:44
2. Mark Knight & MTV featuring E-Man - "A New Reality" (Dub Mix) – 4:48
3. DJ Koze - "Brutalga Square" – 5:35
4. Konfekt - "Ra (Bammel)" – 3:39
5. Agoria - "La Onzieme Marche" – 4:49
6. Alex Neri - "Aurora" – 8:11
7. Michael Burns pres. Blue Haze - "Into Nothing" – 6:47
8. Pinktronix - "Song About Nothing" (Swayzak Remix) – 4:53
9. Swayzak - "Bergerie" – 4:47
10. Etienne De Crecy & Alex Gopher - "Overnet" – 6:43
11. FB - "Who's Knockin'?" (Instrumental Club Mix) – 7:16
12. Etienne De Crecy & Boom Bass - "Bit Torrent"
