= Rock 'n' Rave =

2008 studio album by Benny Benassi

Studio album by Benny Benassi
- Released: 3 June 2008; 27 May 2008 (iTunes); 16 June 2008 (Bulgaria; digital download) (in Bulgarian)
- Genre: Electro house
- Label: Ultra

Benny Benassi chronology
Hypnotica (2003)	Rock 'n' Rave (2008)	Electroman (2011)

Rock 'n' Rave is the second studio album by Italian DJ and record producer Benny Benassi. It was released on 3 June 2008, through Ultra Music. The album sees a change in Benassi's sound from that he used from 2003's Hypnotica until 2005's ...Phobia. It would also see Benassi featuring a more diverse pool of vocalists than the ones him and Al Benassi used on previous albums, with Sannie Carlson being the only returning vocalist.

== Track listing ==
Disc one
No.	Title	Writer(s)	Length
1.	"Finger Food"	Alle Benassi	7:11
2.	"My Body" (featuring Mia J)	Alle Benassi; Marco Benassi; M. Crispin; T. Kent	6:11
3.	"Shocking Silence" (featuring Dino)	Alle Benassi; D. Lanni; Marco Benassi	8:33
4.	"U Move U Rock Me"	Alle Benassi	5:04
5.	"Who's Your Daddy?" (Pump-kin Remix)	Alle Benassi; G. Pignagnoli; Marco Benassi; S. Carlson	5:20
6.	"Here and Now"	Alle Benassi	5:49
7.	"Rock 'n' Rave"	Alle Benassi; Marco Benassi; Paul Sears	5:03
8.	"I Am Not Drunk"	Alle Benassi	5:04
9.	"Free Your Mind (On the Floor)" (featuring Farenheit)	Alle Benassi; Marco Benassi; T. Harold	5:19
10.	"Love and Motion" (featuring Christian Burns)	Alle Benassi; Christian Burns; Marco Benassi	5:47
11.	"Come Fly Away" (featuring Channing)	Alle Benassi; C. Banks; Marco Benassi	4:56

Disc two
No.	Title	Writer(s)	Length
1.	"Bring the Noise" (Public Enemy vs. Benny Benassi) (Pump-kin Remix)	Carlton Ridenhour; Eric Sadler; Hank Shocklee	6:38
2.	"Everybody Everybody" (Black Box vs. Benny Benassi)	D. Davoli; M. Limoni; V. Semplici	7:25
3.	"Eclectic Strings"	Alle Benassi; Marco Benassi	6:11
4.	"Who's Your Daddy?" (David Guetta & Joachim Garraud Remix)	Alle Benassi; G. Pignagnoli; Marco Benassi; S. Carlson	7:23
5.	"Electro Sixteen" (Benny Benassi vs. Iggy Pop)	Alle Benassi; Iggy Pop; Marco Benassi	6:31
6.	"I Love My Sex" (Pump-kin Remix)	Alle Benassi; Marco Benassi; Violeta Bratu; Alfredo Pignagnoli	7:04

- "Eclectic Strings" is the instrumental track to "My Body".
- "Bring the Noise" is a remix of the Public Enemy hit.
- "Electro Sixteen" is a remix of the Iggy Pop song "Sixteen".
- "I Love My Sex" is an enhanced CD bonus video, not a music track.
