= Subliminal Sessions 6 =

Subliminal Session, Vol. 6

Compilation album by Benny Benassi
- Released: 2004
- Genres: Electro, house
- Length: Disc 1: 1:06:41; Disc 2: 01:01:31
- Label: Subliminal Records
- Producer: Benny Benassi

Benny Benassi chronology
DJ Set 1 (2003)	Subliminal Session, Vol. 6 (2004)	The Gallery: Live Sessions (2005)

Subliminal Sessions 6 is a compilation album mixed by Euro house DJ/producer Benny Benassi released in 2004. It is the sixth installment in the Subliminal Sessions series, released as a double disc album.

== Track listing ==
=== Disc 1 ===
1. Praise Cats & Andrea Love - "Sing" – 6:36
2. Buddha Soul Project - "Brazil in my Mind" – 3:56
3. Harrison Crump - "Burning up (Layla)" – 4:01
4. Dave Clark - "Way of Life" – 5:57
5. Vantage Point - "Can't Get It Wrong" (Motocross Mix) – 6:21
6. Benassi Bros. featuring Azibiza - "Turn Me Up" – 6:01
7. Inner City - "Big Fun" (Agoria Remix) – 6:48
8. Francesco Farfa - "Universal Love" – 6:24
9. Evolved vs. OBA - "Afrika (Grounded Deep Mix)" – 6:11
10. Neurotic Jock - "Tribal Injection"
11. Majestic 12 - "Free Funk"

=== Disc 2 ===
1. Rivera & Williams - "Liar" – 5:57
2. Harry Romeo - "Be the One" – 5:58
3. Who Da Funk - "Radio" (Alex Fain Dub) – 5:47
4. The Crystal Method - "Born Too Slow" – 4:57
5. Benny Benassi presents The Biz - "No Matter What You Do" – 5:36
6. Bat 67 - "I Want You To Come" – 4:45
7. Andrea Bertolini - "Nasty Bass" – 4:22
8. Jorge Jaramillo & Sheldon Romero & Alexandra Marin - "House Music Pneumonia" – 5:33
9. Shark & Kemu - "Clear Message EP" – 5:10
10. Antraig & Pons - "Like this" (Tek Edit) – 5:09
11. Thik Dick - "Orgasm" – 8:18
