= Wonderful (Gary Go song) =

Single by Gary Go

from the album Gary Go
- Released: 16 February 2009
- Recorded: 2008
- Genre: Pop rock; synthpop
- Length: 5:10 (album version); 3:39 (radio edit)
- Label: The Canvas Room; Decca
- Songwriter(s): Gary Baker

Gary Go singles chronology
"Wonderful" (2009)	"Open Arms" (2009)

"Wonderful" is the debut single by British singer Gary Go, released on 16 February 2009 from his debut album Gary Go. It reached No. 25 on the UK Singles Chart and the top 40 on the Adult Pop Songs chart in the US. The song was selected as Pop Song of the Year by iTunes US in their Rewind recap of 2009 releases. A version of the song became the title song for the German film Men in the City (German: Männerherzen) for which a new music video was filmed on a Berlin rooftop including scenes from the film. It is also used in the trailer for the Disneynature film Oceans, in the TVI Portuguese novela Mar de Paixão, at the conclusion of an American Idol episode, and in the Eurovision Song Contest 2011 during the interval, in a mini movie involving clips from the shorts that were broadcast before every song from the contest. "Wonderful" was also used in Sky Sports' closing montage of the 2011–12 Premier League season. The song is featured on Disney Channel (including Disney Channel in Southeast Asia).

== Charts ==
Year	Chart	Peak Position
2009	Austrian Singles Chart	39
2009	Belgium Ultratip Chart (Flanders)	17
2009	German Singles Chart	40
2009	Italian Singles Chart	6
2009	Swiss Singles Chart	70
2009	UK Singles Chart	25
2009	US Billboard Adult Pop Airplay	32
