= Cinema (Benny Benassi song) =

2011 single by Benny Benassi

Single by Benny Benassi featuring Gary Go

from the album Electroman
- Released: 8 March 2011
- Recorded: 2010
- Genre: House
- Length: 3:03 (radio edit)
- Label: All Around the World
- Songwriters: Benny Benassi, Alle Benassi, Gary Baker
- Producer: Marco "Benny" Benassi

Benny Benassi singles chronology
"Electroman" (2011)	"Cinema" (2011)	"Beautiful People" (2011)

"Cinema" is a song initially released by Italian DJ and electro house music producer Benny Benassi and British singer-songwriter Gary Go. The song was written and performed by Gary Go with music produced by Benny and Alle Benassi. It was released on 8 March 2011 by Ultra Records and All Around the World, on Benny Benassi's fourth studio album Electroman. The song made its first appearance in the video game Need For Speed: Hot Pursuit in November 2010, months before the song was released as a single. The single EP featured several remixes by Skrillex, Laidback Luke, Alex Gaudino and Congo Rock. The Skrillex remix went on to become a hit in its own right, remaining on Billboard's Dance chart for over two years after its release and winning a 2012 Grammy Award for Best Remixed Recording. Artist and producer Kanye West referred to it as "one of the greatest works of art ever made". The song featured in the trailer for the video game Sonic Lost World and in-games Forza Horizon and Beat Fever, as well as soundtracking promos for the WWE Network. The song has been streamed over a billion times online across streaming platforms (YouTube, Spotify, Apple Music). The song was further re-imagined by Gary Go on his soundtrack EP Now Was Once the Future and again by electronic dance music duo Galantis in 2020.

In late 2020–early 2021, a solo acoustic version of the song by Gary Go went viral on TikTok and Instagram, appearing in more than 50,000 videos as of March 6, 2022. A mashup with "The Veldt" by deadmau5 also went viral, with over 25 million impressions on Instagram alone.

== Music video ==
A music video to accompany the release of "Cinema" was first released onto YouTube on 24 March 2011 at a total length of three minutes and thirty-nine seconds. It features Benny Benassi, producer Alle Benassi and Gary Go. The video was later featured in the Beavis and Butt-head episode "Copy Machine".

The music video revolves on Benassi waiting in a room, later being led by an unamed scientist as Benassi uses a futuristic headset to watch 4-D videos of his presumed girlfriend, doing this multiple times back and forth until his girlfriend finally appears in real life with a video cartridge.

== Track listing ==
UK Digital download
No.	Title	Length
1.	"Cinema" (Radio Edit)	3:03
2.	"Cinema" (Extended Mix)	4:55
3.	"Cinema" (Skrillex UK Radio Edit)	3:17
4.	"Cinema" (Alex Gaudino and Jason Rooney Remix)	8:12
5.	"Cinema" (Laidback Luke Remix)	6:08
6.	"Cinema" (Congorock Remix)	5:58
7.	"Cinema" (DJ Mazza Club Mix)	6:02

iTunes Digital download – Cinema (feat. Gary Go) [Part 1] - EP
No.	Title	Length
1.	"Cinema" (Radio Edit)	3:03
2.	"Cinema" (Extended Mix)	4:55
3.	"Cinema" (Congorock Remix)	5:58
4.	"Cinema" (Alex Gaudino and Jason Rooney Remix)	8:16
5.	"Cinema" (Andrea "DJ Mazza" Mazza Club Mix)	6:02

iTunes Digital download – Cinema (Remixes) (feat. Gary Go), Pt. 2 - EP
No.	Title	Length
1.	"Cinema" (Skrillex Radio Edit)	3:11
2.	"Cinema" (Skrillex Remix)	5:07
3.	"Cinema" (Laidback Luke Remix)	6:08
4.	"Cinema" (Maurizio Gubellini Remix)	6:02
5.	"Cinema" (DJ Mazza Dub Mix)	5:45

== Commercial performance ==
The single was certified platinum in Canada through Music Canada for selling over 80,000 downloads. The single was certified platinum in Australia for selling over 75,000 downloads. The single was certified gold in New Zealand. The Skrillex remix is certified double-platinum in the United States for over 2,000,000 downloads.

In the US, the single achieved a milestone of sorts when it spent a record 48 weeks from 2011 to 2012 on the Bubbling Under Hot 100 Singles, the fifth-highest number of weeks that a single has ever remained on that chart without advancing into the Billboard Hot 100.

== Charts ==
=== Weekly charts ===
Chart (2011–12)	Peak position
Australia (ARIA)	26
Belgium (Ultratip Bubbling Under Flanders)	7
Belgium (Ultratip Bubbling Under Wallonia)	17
Canada (Canadian Hot 100)	64
Ireland (IRMA)	35
Netherlands (Dutch Top 40)	26
Netherlands (Single Top 100)	49
New Zealand (Recorded Music NZ)	13
Scottish Singles Sales (Official Charts)	14
Sweden (Sverigetopplistan)	42
UK Dance (Official Charts)	6
UK Singles (Official Charts)	20
US Bubbling Under Hot 100 (Billboard)	2
US Dance Airplay (Billboard)	1

=== Year-end charts ===
Chart (2011)	Position
Australia (ARIA)	79
US Dance/Mix Show Airplay (Billboard)	15

== Certifications ==
Region	Certification	Certified units/sales
Australia (ARIA)	3× Platinum	210,000^{‡}
Canada (Music Canada)	2× Platinum	160,000^{‡}
New Zealand (RMNZ)	2× Platinum	60,000^{‡}
United Kingdom (BPI)	Gold	400,000^{‡}
United States (RIAA) Skrillex remix	Platinum	1,000,000^{*}
^{*} Sales figures based on certification alone.^{‡} Sales+streaming figures based on certification alone.

== Release history ==
Region	Date	Format	Label
United Kingdom	24 July 2011	Digital download	All Around the World
United States	February 2013	Radio release	Ultra Records
