= Cooking for Pump-Kin: Special Menu =

Cooking For Pump-Kin: Special Menu

Compilation album by Benny Benassi
- Released: 2007
- Genre: Electro, house
- Length: 1.8:32
- Label: Pump-Kin Music; Ultra
- Producer: Benny Benassi

Benny Benassi chronology
Best of Benny Benassi (2006)	Cooking For Pump-Kin: Special Menu (2007)	Toolroom Knights (2009)

Cooking for Pump-Kin: Special Menu is a compilation album by Euro house DJ/producer Benny Benassi released in 2007. This is the second release on the Pump-Kin Music label.

This is the official compilation from Benny Benassi's 'Canadian Bus Tour'.

"I wanted to do this tour across Canada in a bus and not by a plane to get to know the country better. I've played my sets in various towns over the past few years and I've always wished to come back and explore. I also thought it would be a good idea to have a kind of souvenir of my Canadian journey to share with all the people who come out and party when I play. That's the reason behind this compilation. I really hope you have as much fun listening to it as I did mixing it. Thanks, Benny".

== Track listing ==
1. Depeche Mode - "Everything Counts" (Oliver Huntemann & Stephen Bodzin Dub) – 6:35
2. D.I.M. - "Sisyphos" – 3:50
3. Ame - "Rej" (Pastaboys Club Mix) – 3:34
4. Bodyrox featuring Luciana - "Yeah, Yeah" (D. Ramirez Vocal Club Mix) – 3:33
5. Moby - "Go" (Trentemoller Remix) – 4:35
6. TV Rock featuring Seany B - "Flaunt It" (Dirty South Remix) – 4:16
7. Chris Lake featuring Laura V. - "Changes" (Dirty South Remix) – 4:24
8. Audiojack - "Robot" – 3:44
9. Fedde le Grand - "Put Your Hands Up For Detroit" – 3:59
10. Dave Spoon - "At Night" – 4:07
11. Benny Benassi - "Party All The Time (Toscadisco Bombenalarm Mix)" – 4:26
12. John Acquaviva presents Sroen Weber - "First Stroke" – 4:14
13. Jerry Ropero - "The Storm" (Dubelektro Mix) – 4:36
14. Sono - "Keep Control" (Tocadisco Remix) – 4:10
15. Boosta - "Dance is Dead" (Tocadisco Remix) – 4:10
16. Benny Benassi presents The Biz - "Love Is Gonna Save Us" (2007 remix) – 4:07
