= Best of Benny Benassi =

Best Of Benny Benassi

Greatest hits album by Benny Benassi
- Released: 2006
- Genre: Electro, house
- Length: ?
- Label: ZYX Music

Benassi chronology
Best Of Benny Benassi (2006)

Best of Benny Benassi is a greatest hits/best-of album released by Euro house DJ/producer Benny Benassi in 2006. Ten of its fourteen tracks are from his debut album Hypnotica.

== 2006 track listing ==
#	Artist	Featuring	Title	Version	Length
1.	Benny Benassi		Satisfaction	Original Album Version	04:46
2.	Benny Benassi		Love Is Gonna Save Us		05:05
3.	Benny Benassi		Who's Your Daddy?	Radio Edit	03:28
4.	Benny Benassi		Time		04:42
5.	Benny Benassi		Able To Love	Sfaction Mix	05:24
6.	Benny Benassi		Get Loose		05:10
7.	Benny Benassi		Inside Of Me		03:52
8.	Benny Benassi		No Matter What You Do		04:07
9.	Benny Benassi		Change Style		03:47
10.	Benny Benassi		I Wanna Touch Your Soul		04:06
11.	Benny Benassi		Put Your Hands Up		03:54
12.	Benny Benassi		Megamix	Version 1	06:37
13.	Benny Benassi		Who's Your Daddy?	Fuzzy Hair Remix	06:31
14.	Benny Benassi		Satisfaction	Isak Original	04:32

Best of Benny Benassi

Greatest hits album by Benny Benassi
- Released: 2007
- Genre: Electro, house
- Length: ?
- Label: ZYX Music

Benassi chronology
Best Of Benny Benassi (2007)

== 2007 track listing ==
=== Disc 1 ===
#	Artist	Featuring	Title	Version	Length
1.	Benny Benassi	Naan	Who's Your Daddy?	Radio Edit	03:29
2.	Benny Benassi Presents The Biz		Stop Go	Original Extended	06:00
3.	Benny Benassi		B-Tone		01:02
4.	Benny Benassi Presents The Biz		Satisfaction		04:48
5.	Benny Benassi Presents The Biz		Time		04:44
6.	Benny Benassi Presents The Biz		Able To Love	Sfaction Radio Edit	03:30
7.	Benny Benassi Presents The Biz		Get Loose		05:12
8.	Benny Benassi Presents The Biz		Put Your Hands Up		03:57
9.	Benassi Bros.	Violeta	I Love My Sex	Radio Edit	03:31
10.	Benny Benassi Presents The Biz		Love Is Gonna Save Us	LP Version	05:08
11.	Benny Benassi Presents The Biz		No Matter What You Do	LP Version	04:11
12.	Benassi Bros.	Sandy	Feel Alive	Radio Edit	03:45
13.	Benassi Bros.	Dhany	Rocket In The Sky	Radio Edit	04:01
14.	Benassi Bros.	Dhany	Every Single Day	Radio Edit	03:34

=== Disc 2 ===
#	Artist	Featuring	Title	Version	Length
1.	In-Grid		In-Tango	Sfaction Extended	05:09
2.	KMC	Sandy	Get Better	Sfaction Reloaded Mix	05:37
3.	Ann Lee		No No No	Sfaction Mix	05:07
4.	Dhany		Miles Of Love	Beeside Radio Edit	03:38
5.	Benny Benassi Presents The Biz		Love Is Gonna Save Us	Remix 2007	06:39
6.	Benny Benassi	Naan	Who's Your Daddy	Fuzzy Hair Remix	06:35
7.	Benny Benassi Presents The Biz		Stop Go	B-Side Mix	05:22
8.	Benny Benassi Presents The Biz		No Matter What You Do	Vision X-Long Mix	06:14
9.	Benny Benassi Presents The Biz		Satisfaction	B.Deep Remix	06:30
10.	Benassi Bros.	Sandy	Illusion	Sfaction Mix	05:26
11.	Benassi Bros.	Dhany	Rocket In The Sky	Club Mix	06:33
12.	Benassi Bros.	Sandy	Feel Alive	Fuzzy Hair Vocal Mix	07:12
13.	Various		Bootleg Megamix		09:48
