= Benassi Bros. =

Italian electronica group

- Also known as: Bat67
- Origin: Italy
- Genres: Electronic; house; Techno; electroclash
- Years active: Late 1980s–present
- Members: Benny Benassi; Alle Benassi

Benassi Bros. is an Italian electronic dance music group. The members of the group, cousins Benny Benassi and Alle Benassi, started DJing in the late 1980s in their hometown before moving to Larry Pignagnoli's Off Limits production studio in the mid-1990s. There, they created music for various acts including Whigfield, J.K. and Ally & Jo. Despite the name "Benassi Bros.", Benny Benassi and Alle Benassi are actually cousins. Their track "Illusion" became very popular in the American club scene, finally peaking at number 4 on Hot Dance Club Play. Following this, "Hit My Heart" peaked at 15.

== Discography ==
=== Studio albums ===
- Pumphonia (2004)
- ...Phobia (2005)
- Hit My Heart (Best of Dhany) (2021)

=== Compilation albums ===
- Best of Benassi Bros. (2005)
- Best of Benassi Bros. (2006)

=== Singles ===
- "Illusion" - #4 US Dance
- "Hit My Heart" - #15 US Dance
- "Make Me Feel"
- "Every Single Day" (with Dhany) - #24 US Dance Singles Sales
- "Rocket in the Sky"

== See also ==
- Benny Benassi
- Alle Benassi
- Sandy
- Dhany
- Larry Pignagnoli
- Whigfield
