= Toolroom Knights (Benny Benassi album) =

Compilation album by Benny Benassi
- Released: 2009
- Genre: Electro, house
- Label: Pump-Kin Music; Ultra
- Producer: Benny Benassi

Benny Benassi chronology
Cooking for Pump-Kin: Special Menu (2007)	Toolroom Knights (2009)

Toolroom Knights is a compilation album by Italian house music DJ/producer Benny Benassi. The album charted on Billboard's Dance/Electronic Albums chart, peaking at #21 on 21 February 2009.

== Track listing ==
CD1:

1. "Panic Attack" 4:43
2. "We Love This Disco Sound (Cut N Rub Dub)" 4:48
3. "LookLookLook (In Flagranti Remix)" 4:46
4. "Hi Friend" 5:44
5. "Electro Sixteen" 5:31
6. "Freeze" 4:42
7. "Lava Lava (Feadz Aval Aval Remix)" 4:01
8. "Sunglasses at Night (Popof Remix 2)" 4:13
9. "Stay The Same (Alex Gopher Dub)" 4:31
10. "Are You Ready? (Laidback Luke Remix)" 5:44
11. "Kosimo" 5:12
12. "Gas Face (Japanese Popstars Remix)" 6:12
13. "Aurora (Shinichi Osawa Remix)" 5:09

CD2:

1. "I'll Work Ya Babe" 5:45
2. "Control" 4:45
3. "88" 5:00
4. "Enjoy The Silence (Workidz Remix)" 5:30
5. "Technik (Richard Murray's Lil Muz Remix)" 5:00
6. "Azteca" 5:07
7. "Nothing But Love (Tiger Stripes Remix)" 6:00
8. "Golden Walls" 5:15
9. "The Ridge (Tommy Trash Remix)" 5:32
10. "Quantum" 6:30
11. "Girls Suckcces (Dub Mix)" 6:07
12. "Music Matters (Axwell Remix)" 6:52
13. "Excuses" 5:46
