= Hypnotica (Benny Benassi album) =

Studio album by Benny Benassi
- Released: 19 August 2003
- Genre: Electro house
- Length: 61:27
- Labels: Ultra; Data; Ministry of Sound; Energy; ZYX
- Producer: Larry Pignagnoli

Benny Benassi chronology
Hypnotica (2003)	Rock 'n' Rave (2008)

Professional ratings
Review scores
Source	Rating
About.com	link

Hypnotica is the debut studio album by Italian DJ and producer Benny Benassi. Released in 2003 under the name "Benny Benassi presents The Biz", with The Biz consisting of singers/dancers Paul French and Violeta Bratu, the album reached the top five in the French album charts. For fusing 1980s styles with his electronic music, Hypnotica is considered a landmark electro house album, as it successfully incorporates both sounds found in electroclash and many elements of house music consistently. Multiple singles were released from the album, such as "Satisfaction", "No Matter What You Do", "Love Is Gonna Save Us" and "Able to Love".

== Track listing ==
No.	Title	Writer(s)	Length
1.	"Satisfaction" (album version)	Alle Benassi	4:55
2.	"Able to Love"	Alle Benassi; Marco Benassi; Daniela Galli	3:26
3.	"No Matter What You Do"	Alle Benassi; Marco Benassi; Daniela Galli	4:06
4.	"Let It Be"	Alle Benassi; Daniela Galli; Alfredo Pignagnoli	4:31
5.	"Love Is Gonna Save Us"	Alle Benassi; Marco Benassi; Daniela Galli	5:04
6.	"Inside of Me"	Alle Benassi; Marco Benassi	3:50
7.	"I Wanna Touch Your Soul"	Alle Benassi; Daniela Galli	4:06
8.	"I'm Sorry"	Alle Benassi; Alfredo Pignagnoli	4:35
9.	"Time"	Alle Benassi; Marco Benassi; Daniela Galli	4:41
10.	"Put Your Hands Up"	Alle Benassi; Daniela Galli	3:54
11.	"Get Loose"	Alle Benassi; Marco Benassi	5:09
12.	"Change Style"	Alle Benassi; Marco Benassi	3:45
13.	"I Love My Sex" (featuring Violeta)	Alle Benassi; Marco Benassi; Violeta Bratu; Alfredo Pignagnoli	3:26
14.	"Don't Touch Too Much" (featuring Paul French)	Alle Benassi; Marco Benassi; Daniela Galli; Paul Sears; Alfredo Pignagnoli	5:49

== Charts ==
=== Weekly charts ===
Weekly chart performance for Hypnotica
Chart (2003)	Peak position
Belgian Albums (Ultratop Wallonia)	21
French Albums (SNEP)	5
Swiss Albums (Schweizer Hitparade)	32

=== Year-end charts ===
2003 year-end chart performance for Hypnotica
Chart (2003)	Position
French Albums (SNEP)	64

2004 year-end chart performance for Hypnotica
Chart (2004)	Position
French Albums (SNEP)	135

== Certifications ==
Certifications for Hypnotica
Region	Certification	Certified units/sales
France (SNEP)	2× Gold	200,000^{*}
Russia (NFPF)	4× Platinum	80,000^{*}
^{*} Sales figures based on certification alone.
