= Gary Go (album) =

Studio album by Gary Go
- Released: 26 May 2009
- Recorded: 2008
- Genre: Pop rock
- Length: 47:07
- Labels: Decca; The Canvas Room

Singles from Gary Go
- 1. "Wonderful" Released: 16 February 2009; 2. "Open Arms" Released: 18 May 2009; 3. "Engines" Released: 20 July 2009

Gary Go (sometimes referred to with the subtitle Of Youth / Of Beauty) is the self-titled debut studio album by British singer, songwriter and producer Gary Go. It was released on 26 May 2009 on Decca Records and reached number 22 on the UK Albums Charts in June 2009.

== Track listing ==
No.	Title	Length
1.	"Open Arms"	5:00
2.	"So So"	4:20
3.	"Engines"	3:55
4.	"Wonderful"	5:10
5.	"Life Gets in the Way"	4:05
6.	"Brooklyn"	3:35
7.	"Refuse to Lose"	4:03
8.	"Honest"	4:28
9.	"Heart and Soul"	3:54
10.	"Speak"	5:01
11.	"Black and White Days"	3:32

== Reception ==
Writing for BBC Music, Chris Jones described the album as "an album of impeccable, modern, downbeat pop". However, NME's Jason Draper criticized it as "vanilla bland cake" and "emotional music box ticking." Joe Rivers, of No Rip Cord magazine called it "an unforgivably turgid album that is bad in practically every way imaginable."
