= Danceaholic =

Studio album by Benny Benassi
- Released: 15 July 2016
- Recorded: 2013–2016
- Genre: Progressive house; electro house; dance-pop; house; trance; R&B
- Label: Ultra

Benny Benassi chronology
Electroman (2011)	Danceaholic (2016)

Singles from Danceholic
- 1. "Dance the Pain Away" Released: 24 June 2013; 2. "Back to the Pump" Released: 3 December 2013; 3. "Shooting Helicopters" Released: 25 August 2014; 4. "Gangsta" Released: 6 October 2014; 5. "I Want to Be a Disco" Released: 20 April 2015; 6. "Who I Am" Released: 30 July 2015; 7. "Even If" Released: 22 January 2016; 8. "Beardo" Released: 11 March 2016; 9. "Paradise" Released: 31 March 2016

Danceholic is the fourth studio album by Italian DJ and record producer Benny Benassi. It was released on 15 July 2016, through Ultra Music.

== Track listing ==
All music is composed by Benny Benassi.

No.	Title	Collaborator(s)	Length
1.	"Paradise" (with Chris Brown)		3:53
2.	"Danceaholic"		3:35
3.	"Out of Control" (featuring Richard Judge)		3:40
4.	"Universe" (featuring BullySongs)		3:20
5.	"Gangsta" (radio edit)	Benny Benassi; MOGUAI	3:20
6.	"Even If" (with Vassy)		3:22
7.	"Carousel" (featuring Elle Vee)	Benassi; MazZz	3:32
8.	"I Wanna Be Disco" (2016 edit) (featuring Bonnie Calean)	Benassi; Chicco Secci	3:41
9.	"Pandemonium" (featuring FATHERDUDE)	Benassi; David Zowie	2:46
10.	"Dance the Pain Away" (2016 edit) (featuring John Legend)		2:56
11.	"I Keep Running" (featuring Sheare)		3:27
12.	"Who I Am" (Back to the Future Mix) (featuring Christian Burns)	Benassi; Marc Benjamin	3:41
13.	"West Coast Patrol"	Benassi; Chris Nasty; MazZz	4:43
14.	"Shooting Helicopters" (radio edit) (featuring Serj Tankian)		3:30
15.	"Analog Heart"	Benassi; MazZz	3:03
16.	"I Wanna Be a DJ"		2:11
17.	"Beardo" (radio edit)		2:54
18.	"Back to the Pump" (radio edit)		3:13

== Charts ==
Chart (2016)	Peak position
US Top Dance Albums (Billboard)	7
