= Gary Go =

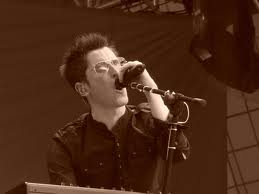

Background information
- Born: Gary Baker
- Origin: London, United Kingdom
- Instruments: Vocals; piano; synth; guitar; computer
- Labels: Decca; Polydor; The Canvas Room; The Whipping Club
- Website: garygo.ink

Gary Baker, known professionally as Gary Go, is a British songwriter, producer, composer and media artist. He has written and produced songs performed by artists including Rihanna, Robbie Williams, Steve Angello, Benny Benassi, Skrillex, deadmau5, Gryffin, Take That, Celeste, Majid Jordan, John Summit, Aloe Blacc, Rag'n'Bone Man, Matoma, Sara Bareilles, Chiiild, Milky Chance, The Knocks, Ruby Rose, Borgore, The 2 Bears, Party Pupils, Seeb, Kylie, Ronan Keating, Morgxn, Simply Red, Katharine McPhee, Joseph Arthur, Thomas Azier, Carina Round, Laleh, Anthony Ramos, The Kolors and Juliette Lewis.

== Overview ==
His debut artist album Of Youth/Of Beauty spawned the international hit single "Wonderful". Upon the album's release, Lady Gaga referred to Gary Go as "my favourite new artist this year" after performing a rendition of "Just Dance", inspired by his cover of the song. Gaga then invited Go to join her on her European tour. Tours with MIKA and Snow Patrol followed.

Gary Go went on to collaborate with electro DJ/producer Benny Benassi, writing and performing three consecutive #1 club records ("Close to Me", "Control" and "Cinema"). "Cinema", rose rapidly to No. 1 on the US Billboard and UK Club charts and received a Grammy Award for the remix by electronic music producer Skrillex. "Cinema" is widely recognised as a seminal dance record, included in Billboard's "Best Dance Songs of the Decade" and "Top EDM Love Songs of All Time" retrospectives. Artist and producer Kanye West referred to it as "one of the greatest works of art ever made".

As a solo artist, Go went on to release Now Was Once the Future (2012), a videotape and original soundtrack, and Love Lost Freedom Found (2020), a live museum exhibit and accompanying soundtrack album, inspired by the Museum of Broken Relationships. Earmilk referred to the album as a "visceral narrative that explores the cavernous depths of human relationships."

Gary Go composed the original scores for two feature films by German filmmaker Simon Verhoeven; the hit cultural comedy Wilkommen bei den Hartmanns and the cyber-horror Friend Request (included in Metal Hammer's "Ten Horror Soundtracks to Scare Your Pants Off!" feature).

== Innovation ==
Gary Go has gained publicity and media attention for his use of technology and social media tools. He was the first artist to use Twitter as a tool for collaborative songwriting and an early adopter of integrating the iPhone into studio and live applications.

== Works ==
=== Artist discography ===
- 2020 || "Love Lost Freedom Found" (album/exhibit)
- 2018 || "Cinema – Acoustic" (single)
- 2015 || "Crying Sound" (audiovisual)
- 2014 || "Through the Walls" (audiovisual)
- 2012 || "Now Was Once the Future" (audiovisual EP)
- 2009 || "Of Youth/Of Beauty" (album)
- 2009 || "Wonderful" (single)
- 2005 || "The Diary of Rodney Harvey" (EP)
- 2005 || "So So..." (EP)

=== Songwriter discography ===
(π Also producer) (∆ Also featured vocalist)

- 2025 || "Too Far" - Remme
- 2025 || "Be Like That" – Seeb, JP Cooper
- 2025 || "Goodlife" – Rag'n'Bone Man, WizTheMC (OST "The Bad Guys 2" | DreamWorks)
- 2025 || "Nightlife ft. Koates" – Klingande
- 2024 || "I Love You, Bye" – Matoma
- 2024 || "Undo ft. Koates" – John Summit
- 2024 || "Trapdoor", "Islands" – Ava Lily
- 2024 || "Heat" – Remme
- 2023 || "My Revival", "Fading" – MORGXN
- 2023 || "The Veldt Cinema" ∆ – deadmau5, Benny Benassi
- 2023 || "Invisible" – Thomas Azier
- 2022 || "It Is What It Is", "Glass of Wine" – Milky Chance
- 2022 || "London Bridge" – Dave Rowntree
- 2022 || "Good Tonight" – Anthony Ramos (OST "The Bad Guys" | DreamWorks)
- 2022 || "Come With Me" – Yola (Opening title song – "Green Eggs & Ham" Season 2 | Netflix)
- 2022 || "Sad Party", "Happy Switch", "Tight Fit" π – Ava Lily
- 2022 || "Ain't Me Without You" – WEISS
- 2021 || "Hold On Til We Get There" – Chiiild
- 2021 || "Tape Over It" – Nathan Ball
- 2021 || "Believe" π – Aloe Blacc – (End titles – "The Rescue" | National Geographic)
- 2021 || "Japanese Trees" π – Koates
- 2021 || "Waves of Blue", "Forget About The Party", "Life Worth Living" – Majid Jordan
- 2021 || "Cinema" ∆ – Galantis
- 2020 || "Little Runaway" – Celeste
- 2020 || "Wonder" – MORGXN, Sara Bareilles, Jagwar Twin
- 2020 || "West Coast Tears" ∆ – Party Pupils
- 2020 || "Get Older", "Bittersweet", "Lose Touch", "The Moment", "Ghosts" – Remme
- 2020 || "Cry ft. John Martin" – Gryffin
- 2020 || "Map Of Your Loneliness" – Thomas Azier
- 2017 || "The Last Spark" – Jamie Lawson
- 2016 || "Love My Life" π – Robbie Williams
- 2015 || "Towards The Sun" π – Rihanna (OST "Home" | DreamWorks)
- 2015 || "Prisoner" ∆ – Steve Angello
- 2015 || "Your Body ft. Giorgio Moroder" – Kylie
- 2015 || "School Daze" – Borgore
- 2014 || "Boom" – Laleh
- 2014 || "Let In The Sun", "Into The Wild" – Take That
- 2014 || "Not This Time" – The 2 Bears
- 2014 || "Let This Last Forever" ∆ – Benny Benassi
- 2014 || "Open Heart" ∆ – (OST Just Before I Go)
- 2013 || "Adrenaline" ∆ – Sam LaMore
- 2012 || "Marcel Marcel (The Arrangement)" – Carina Round
- 2012 || "Guilty Pleasure" ∆ – Ruby Rose
- 2012 || "Wasted Light" – Ronan Keating
- 2012 || "The Song I Sang Before I Met You – Sylvie Lewis (OST "Echo Park")
- 2011 || "Cinema", "Close To Me", "Control" ∆ – Benny Benassi
- 2011 || "Magic" ∆, "The Prize" π, "R.O.Y.L" – The Knocks
- 2010 || "It's Not Right" – Katharine McPhee
- 2009 || "Backseat" – Carina Round
- 2007 || "Sing" ∆ – (OST Freefonix | BBC)
- 2007 || "Come To You" – Carina Round

=== Composer ===
- 2023 || Panta Rhei | パンタ・レイ − 世界が存在する限り || Digital Media || Composer & Live Performance
- 2020 || U R OK || Digital Media Series || Composer
- 2016 || Wilkommen bei den Hartmanns || Feature || Composer
- 2016 || Friend Request || Feature || Composer
- 2011 || Männerherzen 2 || Feature || Additional Score
- 2007 || Reflections Of A Skyline || Short || Composer

=== Print ===
- 2011 || My First Twook || Illustrated book of Gary Go's tweets (illustrations by Flo Chaplin) || Author
