= ...Phobia =

- Cover to the standard edition of the album

Studio album by Benassi Bros.
- Released: 2005
- Genres: Electro, Techno
- Length: 1:07:40
- Label: Ultra Records

Benassi Bros. chronology
Pumphonia (2004)	...Phobia (2005)

Alternative covers
- French edition

Professional ratings
Review scores
Source	Rating
About.com	link

...Phobia is the second studio album by electronic musicians Benassi Bros., released in 2005. It is the follow-up to their debut album Pumphonia. It went gold in France, followed by huge acclaims for the singles "Every Single Day" and "Make Me Feel".

A part of the "Feel Alive"s melody is based on a remix of the main guitar riff from Eric Clapton's 1970 hit "Layla".

== Track listing ==
No.	Title	Writer(s)	Length
1.	"Make Me Feel" (featuring Dhany)	Alle Benassi; Daniela Galli; Marco Benassi; Paul Sears	5:30
2.	"Light" (featuring Sandy)	Alle Benassi; Galli; Marco Benassi; Sandra Chambers	7:28
3.	"Rocket in the Sky" (featuring Naan)	Alle Benassi; Marco Benassi; Sannie Carlson	5:43
4.	"Every Single Day" (featuring Dhany)	Alle Benassi; Annerley Gordon; Marco Benassi; Sears	4:44
5.	"Castaway" (featuring Sandy)	Alle Benassi; Galli; Marco Benassi	6:04
6.	"Feel Alive" (featuring Naan)	Alle Benassi; Marco Benassi; Carlson	4:48
7.	"Waitin' for You" (featuring JB) (Sfaction version)	Alle Benassi; Gordon; Galli; Marco Benassi; Sears	5:42
8.	"Ride to Be My Girl" (featuring Alle Benassi)	Alle Benassi; Channing Banks	4:40
9.	"Blackbird" (featuring Paul French) (Sfaction version)	Benassi; Galli; Marco Benassi; Sears	6:37
10.	"Somebody to Touch Me" (featuring Dhany) (Sfaction version)	Galli; Davide Riva; Sears	5:40
11.	"Movin' Up" (featuring Sandy) (Sfaction version)	Alle Benassi; Gordon; Galli; Marco Benassi; Sears	5:20
12.	"Run to Me" (featuring Dhany) (Sfaction version)	Alle Benassi; Galli; Marco Benassi; Sears	5:05

- Note: "Rocket in the Sky" and "Feel Alive" were re-recorded when they were released as singles replaced with Dhany and Sandy, respectively.

== Singles ==
- "Make Me Feel"
- "Every Single Day"
- "Rocket in the Sky"
- "Feel Alive"
- "Castaway"

== Certifications ==
Region	Certification	Certified units/sales
France (SNEP)	Gold	100,000^{*}
Russia (NFPF)	2× Platinum	40,000^{*}
^{*} Sales figures based on certification alone.
