= Satisfaction (Benny Benassi song) =

2002 single by Benny Benassi

Single by Benny Benassi presents The Biz

from the album Hypnotica
- Released: 12 June 2002
- Genre: Electro house; techno
- Length: 4:45
- Label: D:vision
- Songwriter: Alle Benassi
- Producer: Benny Benassi

Benny Benassi singles chronology
"Satisfaction" (2002)	"Able to Love" (2003)

Audio sample
- Benny Benassi presents The Biz - "Satisfaction" (Isak original edit): file; help

Alternative cover
- CD single – version by Benny Benassi and the Biz

"Satisfaction" is a song by Italian DJ Benny Benassi. It was released in Italy in June 2002 as the lead single from his album Hypnotica (2003). Using MacinTalk, the song's vocals consist of two speech synthesizers, one male and one female, repeatedly saying "Push me and then just touch me till I can get my satisfaction".

"Satisfaction" served as Benassi's debut single and is his most successful song, peaking at number two in the United Kingdom and earning a gold certification in Australia, Belgium, France, and the United States. As of August 2014, it was the 54th-best-selling single of the 21st century in France, with 382,000 units sold. The track is considered to be the forerunner of electro house that brought the genre into the mainstream.

== Background and composition ==
Benassi stated that the inspiration for “Satisfaction” came from his personal experiences as a DJ and the desire to create a track that would connect with people on a deeper level. He aimed to capture the feeling that occurs on the dance floor when the music takes control and unites a crowd as one. Benassi explained that the identifying melody of the song was brought to him by his cousin Alle Benassi: "When my cousin came to the studio after his tour in Tunisia, he played me a bunch of notes." Alle told DJ Mag: "When I was in Tunisia I was playing the clarinet in my room and there was a traffic jam under the street. And it fixed a bunch of notes into my brain". Following the composition of the instrumental they needed a vocal part, but according to Benassi "getting a vocalist" in Italy wasn't easy, so he "tried with this vocoder". The track is in the key of B-flat minor and plays at 130 beats per minute.

== Music videos ==
The first version of the music video was directed by Mauro Vecchi and features Benny and Alle Benassi, as well as vocalists Paul French and Violeta Claudia Bratu, as they are seen on the album cover of Hypnotica. It consists of one three-second take of the four turning to face the camera and smiling, played in slow-motion to match the length of the song. Overlaid are various animations including close-up pictures of the lips of a man and a woman singing along to the song. This music video was barely played on music channels, although in some countries, it replaced the "construction" version.

The second version of the music video was directed by Dougal Wilson and features women in skimpy construction outfits. It plays like as a musical advertisement for a variety of power tools, with textual graphics describing each tool overlaying scenes of the women using them.

=== Remakes ===
In 2008, men from Viborg, Denmark, got together to re-enact the music video with middle-aged men. It gained some popularity in Denmark and was covered on TV.

On the International Women's Day in 2011, the women's associations of the General Federation of Belgian Labour and Socialistische Partij Anders released a "Granny Remake" of the original video. It was made to raise awareness of the gender pay gap by showing the scantily clad women still working the same jobs at 60–70 years of age.

==== 2018 Russian protest parodies ====
In late 2017, cadets at Russia's Ulyanovsk Institute of Civil Aviation marked the end of their term by making a parody of the video that drew on a similar parody four years earlier by British soldiers. Wearing just their uniform caps and ties, belts worn around their shoulders, underwear (with the crotches stuffed) and black boots, the cadets twerked, gyrated suggestively, and performed maintenance tasks and cleanup in a fashion similar to the video as the cameraman moved from one to the other in their dormitory. The video, which soon went viral, had strong homoerotic elements and suggestions of BDSM culture.

Officials at the institute, described as the oldest and most prestigious pilot training school in Russia, were furious, particularly since the cadets had used school property and worn their uniform caps. Sergey Krasov, the institute's director, said: "If they had joked like that at home, nobody would have batted an eyelid." Shortly after the video became a subject of national discussion, the Federal Air Transport Agency convened a commission to investigate the video and identify the cadets, believed to be in their first year at the institute, who had made it. "Frivolous dances in underwear with the uniform cap of the Institute covering the face on the grounds of the aviation university are unacceptable" the agency said. Any cadets found to be involved could face expulsion.

While some prominent Russian commentators expressed similar outrage on government-run television channels, many more sympathized with the cadets, and made videos of their own in support of them. Most were from other groups of students at trade schools for farmers, construction workers and emergency services, but the Russian women's biathlon team also made one. A Ukrainian swim club filmed part of its video underwater, and a group of retired women living in a St. Petersburg communal apartment contributed their own. Russian American journalist Masha Gessen wrote in The New Yorker that the videos were an unexpected and widespread protest against the state's anti-LGBT policies. "Each clip is at once a show of solidarity with a group of young strangers and a show of ordinary people’s ability to organize and act together—an ability that the state would seem to have stamped out."

== Legacy ==
"Satisfaction" is credited for playing a pivotal role in shaping the electronic music scene and solidifying Benny Benassi's status as a leading figure in the genre. The song's success opened doors for both Benassi and the genre as a whole, bringing electronic music further into the mainstream and gaining recognition from a broader audience. "Satisfaction" is also considered to be the forerunner of electro house that brought the genre into the mainstream.

== Sampling and other versions ==
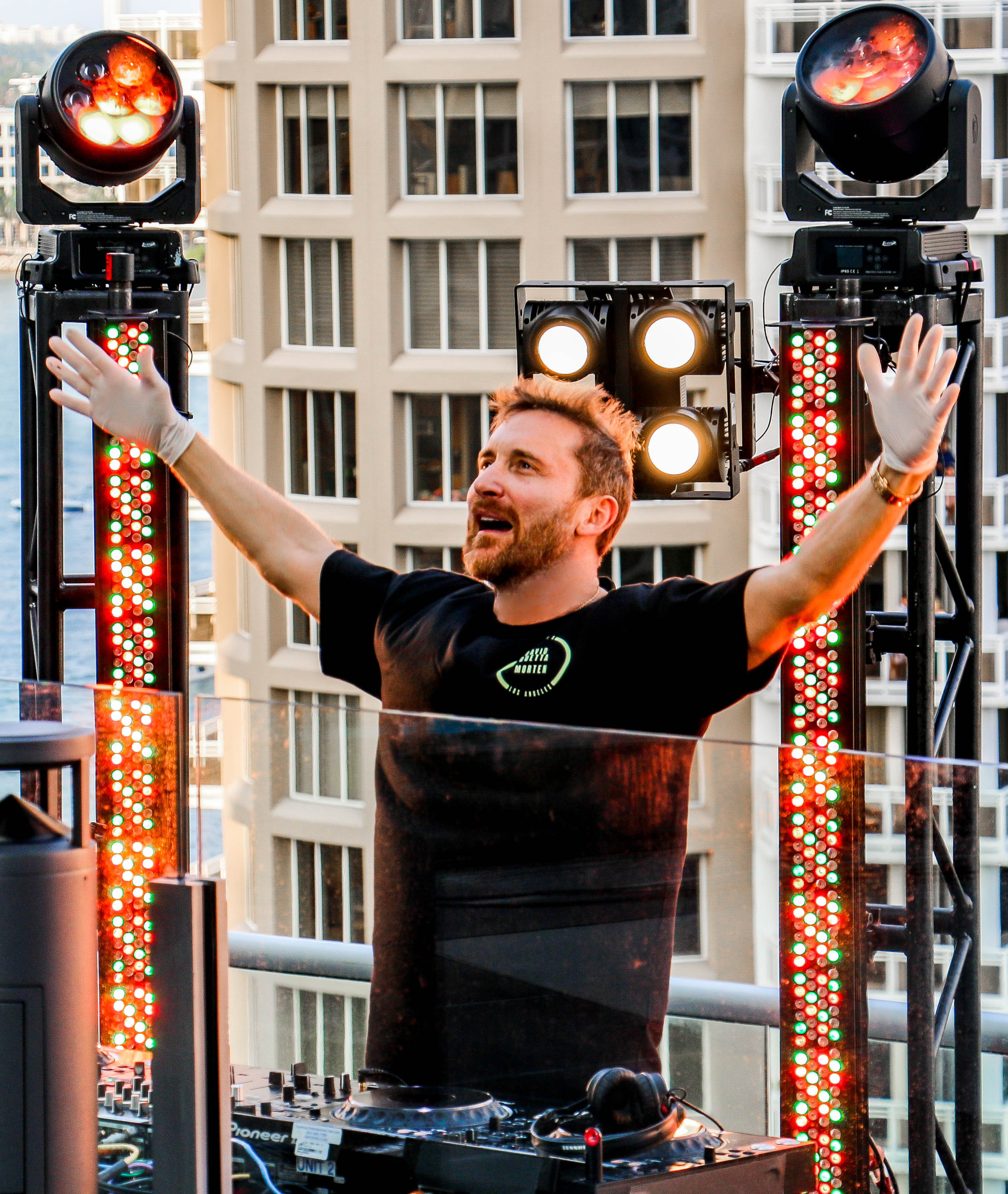
David Guetta released his remix of the track in 2022.

- American rapper Ludacris sampled "Satisfaction" in his song "Ultimate Satisfaction" for his 2006 album Release Therapy.
- Cuban-American DJ Laz used the song's instrumental in his song "Move Shake Drop".
- American rapper Bleood interpolates the main synth lead in his song "Santa Left a Body".
- American rapper Flo Rida's "Touch Me" from his 2009 album R.O.O.T.S. also interpolates parts of "Satisfaction".
- On 12 August 2022, French DJ and producer David Guetta released his remix of "Satisfaction", initially created as a sound design exercise. The Guetta remix mixes the original track's sound with future rave music. Keeping Benassi's synthesizers and vocoders intact, Guetta added "eerie arpeggios" and a "thumping electro sound design" to the track.

== Track listings ==
Italian CD single

1. "Satisfaction (Isak original edit) – 4:44
2. "Satisfaction (Greece dub) – 6:38
3. "Satisfaction (B-Deep remix) – 6:27
4. "Satisfaction (Voltaxx extended remix) – 5:39
5. "Satisfaction (DJ I.C.O.N. remix) – 5:29
6. "Satisfaction (Poxymusic No School remix) – 7:11
7. "Satisfaction (Robbie Rivera remix) – 7:51

German CD single

1. "Satisfaction (Isak original) – 6:36
2. "Satisfaction (Greece dub) – 6:38

UK CD single

1. "Satisfaction (radio edit)
2. "Satisfaction (Isak original)
3. "Satisfaction (Steve Murano remix)
4. "Satisfaction (video)

UK 12-inch single

A. "Satisfaction (Isak original)
B. "Satisfaction (Steve Murano remix)

UK cassette single

1. "Satisfaction (radio edit)
2. "Satisfaction (Isak original)
3. "Satisfaction (Robbie Rivera remix)

US CD single

1. "Satisfaction (radio edit)
2. "Satisfaction (Isak original)
3. "Satisfaction (Greece dub)
4. "Satisfaction (Steve Murano remix)
5. "Satisfaction (Robbie Rivera remix)
6. "Satisfaction (video)

Australian CD single

1. "Satisfaction (radio edit)
2. "Satisfaction (Isak original)
3. "Satisfaction (Poxymusic No School remix)
4. "Satisfaction (Odd School mix)
5. "Satisfaction (Steve Murano remix)
6. "Satisfaction (Radio Slave remix)

== Charts ==
=== Weekly charts ===
Chart (2003)	Peak position
Australia (ARIA)	10
Australian Club Chart (ARIA)	1
Australian Dance (ARIA)	1
Belgium (Ultratop 50 Flanders)	14
Belgium (Ultratop 50 Wallonia)	4
Denmark (Tracklisten)	17
Europe (Eurochart Hot 100)	5
France (SNEP)	4
Germany (GfK)	38
Greece (IFPI)	8
Hungary (Dance Top 40)	2
Ireland (IRMA)	11
Netherlands (Dutch Top 40)	16
Netherlands (Single Top 100)	10
Romania (Romanian Top 100)	29
Scottish Singles Sales (Official Charts)	2
Spain (Promusicae)	18
Switzerland (Schweizer Hitparade)	44
UK Singles (Official Charts)	2
UK Dance (Official Charts)	1
UK Independent (Official Charts)	18
US Dance Airplay (Billboard)	11

=== Year-end charts ===
Chart (2003)	Position
Australia (ARIA)	81
Australian Club Chart (ARIA)	6
Australian Dance (ARIA)	7
Belgium (Ultratop 50 Flanders)	43
Belgium (Ultratop 50 Wallonia)	20
France (SNEP)	14
Ireland (IRMA)	79
Netherlands (Dutch Top 40)	83
Netherlands (Single Top 100)	55
UK Singles (OCC)	69

== Certifications ==
Region	Certification	Certified units/sales
Australia (ARIA)	Gold	35,000^{^}
Belgium (BRMA)	Gold	25,000^{*}
France (SNEP)	Gold	250,000^{*}
France (SNEP) David Guetta remix	Gold	100,000^{‡}
Italy (FIMI)	Gold	50,000^{‡}
New Zealand (RMNZ)	Gold	15,000^{‡}
Poland (ZPAV) David Guetta remix	Gold	25,000^{‡}
Spain (Promusicae) David Guetta remix	Gold	30,000^{‡}
United Kingdom (BPI)	Gold	400,000^{‡}
United States (RIAA)	Gold	500,000^{*}
^{*} Sales figures based on certification alone.^{^} Shipments figures based on certification alone.^{‡} Sales+streaming figures based on certification alone.

== Release history ==
Region	Release date	Format(s)	Label(s)	Ref.
Italy	12 June 2002	12-inch vinyl	D:vision	
United Kingdom	14 July 2003	12-inch vinyl; CD; cassette	Data	
Australia	21 July 2003	CD	Hussle	
