= Beautiful People (Chris Brown song) =

2011 single by Chris Brown

Single by Chris Brown featuring Benny Benassi

from the album F.A.M.E. and Electroman
- Released: March 11, 2011
- Recorded: 2010
- Studio: The Record Plant; (Los Angeles, California)
- Genre: Europop; progressive house
- Length: 3:45
- Label: Jive; Ultra
- Songwriter: Chris Brown
- Producers: Benny Benassi; Alle Benassi

Chris Brown singles chronology
"One Night Stand" (2011)	"Beautiful People" (2011)	"Best Love Song" (2011)

Benny Benassi singles chronology
"Cinema" (2011)	"Beautiful People" (2011)	"Close to Me" (2011)

Music video
- "Beautiful People" on YouTube

"Beautiful People" is a song by American singer Chris Brown featuring Italian DJ Benny Benassi, released as the third single from Brown's fourth studio album F.A.M.E. on March 11, 2011 by Jive Records. It was written by Brown, with Benny Benassi and Alle Benassi handling its production. Musically, "Beautiful People" is an uptempo song which draws from the genres of progressive house and Europop, containing influences of dancehall and R&B. The song’s lyrics revolve around Brown encouraging listeners to be positive by recognizing and appreciating their inner beauty.

The song received critical acclaim for its production and lyrics, with various magazines listing it as one of the best outings of 2011. In the United States, the song peaked at number forty-three on the US Billboard Hot 100 and number one on the US Hot Dance Club Songs chart. It reached the top ten in Australia, Ireland, New Zealand and the United Kingdom, and the top twenty in Belgium and Denmark. The accompanying music video was released on March 22, 2011, and features personal footage of Brown's everyday life. The video also features appearances from several of Brown's famous friends, including Diddy, Bow Wow, T-Pain, Nelly, Timbaland, among others. Brown promoted the song with live performances on Dancing with the Stars, the 2011 MTV Video Music Awards, and the 54th Grammy Awards. It was also included on the set list of his 2011 F.A.M.E. Tour.

== Background and composition ==
"Beautiful People" was written by Brown, with Benny Benassi and Alle Benassi handling its production. It was recorded at The Record Plant—a studio in Los Angeles, California. Before the release of F.A.M.E., the song leaked online on January 16, 2011. The single cover was unveiled on February 2, 2011, showing Brown strapping a gas mask onto his face as he peers up at the camera. The song's title is spelled out in ransom note effect, with Brown's name graffitied onto the bottom right corner. "Beautiful People" was first released for digital download on December 29, 2010. An extended play, featuring additional remixes of the song, was made available for download in the United Kingdom and the United States on April 19, 2011. "Beautiful People" was later included on Benassi's fifth studio album, Electroman (2011), as track four.

"Beautiful People"
A 21-second sample of "Beautiful People", featuring positive and uplifting lyrics.

"Beautiful People" is an uptempo progressive house, and Europop song with dancehall and R&B influences. According to James Dean Wells from AOL Radio, the song is "comprised of pulsing synths that build under Benassi and Brown's staccato and auto-tuned melodies." "Beautiful People" is set in common time with a moderate tempo of 128 beats per minute. It is composed in the key of E♭ major with Brown's vocal range spanning from the note of E♭_{4} to the note of F_{5}. The song is positive and uplifting with lyrics such as: "Everywhere that I've been / The only thing that I see is beautiful people ... / Don't you know / Don't you know / You're beautiful." According to Rap-Up, on the song, Brown encourages "people to be positive discovering their inside beauty." When speaking about "Beautiful People", Brown told Jayson Rodriguez from MTV News that "It was a record where I wanted to inspire people with dance music. We have a lot of tragic things going on and the world needs to come together as a whole and stop the negativity."

== Music video ==
The accompanying music video for "Beautiful People" premiered on MTV's The Seven on March 22, 2011. The video features cameo appearances from Brandy, Tyga, Game, Big Sean, Ryan Leslie, Bow Wow, Pharrell Williams, Swizz Beatz, T-Pain, Estelle, Teyana Taylor, Omarion, Diddy, Kevin McCall, Nelly, and Timbaland. The video opens showing Brown and his dance crew, The Rej3ctz, riding scooters during the night in the streets, before switching to various scenes of Brown singing and dancing in the backseat of a car and hanging out in a recording studio with several famous friends listening to "Beautiful People". The video is also intercut with scenes of Brown and Benassi performing at separate concerts, and Brown in the studio dancing with T-Pain. More scenes feature Brown at the club with Teyana Taylor, Brandy, and Omarion. The video ends by showing Brown standing in front of a wall that has the words 'Beautiful People' graffitied on it.

Becky Bain from Idolator stated that the video was "basically a four-minute statement that Brown still has a bunch of friends on his side." Ann Lee from Metro thought his dancing in the video was "better than his singing but it's still pleasant enough." Tanner Stransky from Entertainment Weekly wrote that the video had a "nice concept", and noted it was "a departure from Brown's trademark glossy clips". Ed Easton Jr. from WXRK called it a "feel-good journey through his everyday life", and wrote "the visuals [in the video] are supposed to show the human side of Chris and his friends enjoying themselves and leaving the stresses of the world behind to be free from criticism."

== Live performances and cover versions ==
A pre-taped performance of Brown performing a medley of "Beautiful People" and "Forever" was shown on the American version of Dancing with the Stars on March 29, 2011. For the performance Brown wore a black and white suit, and was accompanied by a group of robotic dancers dressed in all-white suits adorned with LED lighting. Prior to the performance some of the show's cast were unhappy that Brown was going to perform because of his felony assault against Rihanna in 2009. Host Tom Bergeron told the On Air with Ryan Seacrest radio show that, "I did tell the producers it may be to their advantage to not have me interview him, because my natural tendency would be to say something. So don't put me in a position where you are asking me to not say something, because I really won't do that."

On August 28, 2011, Brown performed a medley of "Beautiful People" and "Yeah 3x" at the 2011 MTV Video Music Awards. He opened the performance with "Yeah 3x" and was dressed in a white formal suit, accompanied by "full-skirted dancers". Brown was eventually joined onstage by tuxedo-clad dancers and began dancing to the 1993 Wu-Tang Clan single "Protect Ya Neck". His dance routine then moved into 1991, where he danced to Nirvana's "Smells Like Teen Spirit". Brown's performance then came back to the future, where he began to sing "Beautiful People". While performing the song, he was suspended in the air, and then lowered to another stage where he continued to perform the song. Brown then went back in the air, where he did splits and back-flips. "Beautiful People" was also added to the set list of Brown's F.A.M.E. Tour in Australia and North America. On October 8, 2011, Nu Vibe sang "Beautiful People" on the eighth series of The X Factor (UK). On December 3, 2011, British singer-songwriter Labrinth covered "Beautiful People" during his set at the Jingle Bell Ball, which was held at the O2 Arena in London.

On February 12, 2012, Brown performed a medley of "Beautiful People" and "Turn Up the Music" at the 54th Grammy Awards, which took place at the Staples Center in Los Angeles, California. He was dressed in a white and gray varsity jacket, white pants and sparkling sneakers. Brown and his backup dancers performed heavily choreographed routines to "Turn Up the Music" atop a collection of blocks, which changed from red to blue to yellow and green. He then sang "Beautiful People" as he jumped across the blocks, while his backup dancers followed in a high-flying routine. The performance ended when Brown saluted to the audience before he took a bow. Rob Markman from MTV News noted that the blocks "resembled the 1980s arcade game Q*bert", while Evelyn McDonnell from Los Angeles Times noted that Brown lip-synched his performance. Andrew Martin from Prefix magazine wrote that it was one of the worst performances at the Grammy Awards due to the fact that he lip-synched. The performance was made available for download via the iTunes Store in the United States on February 15, 2012.

When Steps re-formed in 2011 and announced they would go on tour during Spring in 2012, Lisa Scott-Lee performed a medley as her solo featuring Heaven, Beautiful People and Lately.

== Critical reception ==
The song received critical acclaim. Rolling Stone listed it among the best songs of 2011, calling it a "heavenly bumping psychedelic track". Margaret Wappler from Los Angeles Times praised "Beautiful People", and said that it's filled "with powdered-sugar synths and dance floor positivity". Jon Caramanica from The New York Times wrote that the song "has the clanging, swelling synths that are the hallmark of megaclubs." Editors from Idolator wrote "We like the song, though we don't see anything inherently 'Chris Brown' about this track". Ed Easton Jr. from WNOW-FM wrote that the song "is a softer and sensitive side of Chris Brown as its lyrics are supposed to be meant to inspire others." Joanne Dorken from MTV UK wrote that "Brown offered a performance different to his usual on this Ibiza-dance scene floor filler, which you can't help but move to". James Montgomery from MTV News praised Benassi's production skills, and wrote "It's not a stretch to call 'Beautiful People' not only one of the year's most unexpected singles, but also one of the best." Robert Copsey from Digital Spy awarded "Beautiful People" five out of five stars, and called it a "dancehall thumper about equality and believing in yourself."

Nick Levine from BBC Music wrote that Brown "offers a positive ending to his uplifting F.A.M.E. album" when he unites with Benassi "for the electronic throb of "Beautiful People"". Jamie Horne of The Border Mail wrote that the song "is another thumping four-on-the-floor anthem." Tom Howard from Yahoo! Music called the song a "euphoric progressive house masterpiece outlined by pop attitude". Sean Fennessey from The Washington Post said that on "Beautiful People" Brown "lets his voice be an instrument of the wall-to-wall production". James Montgomery from MTV News placed "Beautiful People" at number 18 on his list of the "25 Best Songs of 2011". He wrote that "this single represents his biggest reinvention to date. A slippery, shiny club track helmed by Benny Benassi, like most of Breezy's work it is undeniably sexy, but it's also subtly smart too. And that's where he made his biggest strides." "Beautiful People" was nominated for Best R&B/Urban Dance Track at the 27th Annual International Dance Music Awards.

== Chart performance ==
In the issue dated September 17, 2011, "Beautiful People" debuted and peaked on the US Billboard Hot 100 chart at number 43. Months before, in the issue dated March 12, 2011, "Beautiful People" debuted at number 37 on the US Hot Dance Club Songs chart; the song peaked at number one in the issue dated May 21, 2011 and became the first number-one single for both Brown and Benassi on the Dance club chart. On October 3, 2017, the single was certified platinum by the Recording Industry Association of America (RIAA) for combined sales and streaming equivalent units of over a million units.

In Canada, the song debuted at number 90 on the Canadian Hot 100 chart dated May 7, 2011. It later peaked at number 22, and spent 10 weeks on the chart. On the Australian Singles Chart, "Beautiful People" debuted at number 14 on March 21, 2011, and peaked at number seven on May 2, 2011. The song was certified double platinum by the Australian Recording Industry Association (ARIA), denoting sales of 140,000 copies.

On the New Zealand Singles Chart, "Beautiful People" debuted at number 40 on March 21, 2011, and peaked at number six on April 18, 2011. It was certified gold by the Recording Industry Association of New Zealand (RIANZ), denoting sales of 7,500 copies. In Ireland, "Beautiful People" debuted at number 39 on March 31, 2011, and peaked at number three on May 5, 2011. In the United Kingdom, "Beautiful People" debuted at number 95 on the UK Singles Chart dated April 9, 2011. After several weeks of climbing up the chart, it peaked at number four on May 7, 2011, where it remained for two consecutive weeks. Overall, it is Brown's fifth UK top ten single as a lead artist. "Beautiful People" also charted on the UK Dance Chart at number two. As of January 2012, the song has sold 588,000 copies in the UK.

== Track listing ==
- Digital download
1. "Beautiful People" featuring Benny Benassi (Main version) – 3:45
2. "Beautiful People" featuring Benny Benassi (Club version) – 5:57
- Digital Remix EP
1. "Beautiful People" (Felix Cartal Club Remix) – 4:31
2. "Beautiful People" (The Knocks Club Remix) – 4:38
3. "Beautiful People" (Ultimate High Radio Remix) – 3:45
4. "Beautiful People" (Lenny B Radio Mix) – 3:19
5. "Beautiful People" (Cosmic Dawn Club Remix) – 6:20
6. "Beautiful People" (Tonal Radio Remix) – 4:03
- Digital download – Live at the 54th Grammy Awards
1. "Turn Up the Music" / "Beautiful People" – 4:07
2. "Turn Up the Music" / "Beautiful People" (Video) – 4:07

== Credits and personnel ==
- Chris Brown – songwriter, lead vocals
- Marco "Benny" Benassi – songwriter, producer
- Alessandro "Alle" Benassi – songwriter, producer
- Jean Baptiste – songwriter
- Serban Ghenea – audio mixing
- John Hanes – engineering
- Tim Roberts – assistant engineering

== Charts ==
=== Weekly charts ===
Weekly chart performance for "Beautiful People"
Chart (2011)	Peak position
Australia (ARIA)	7
Australia Urban (ARIA)	3
Austria (Ö3 Austria Top 40)	26
Belgium (Ultratop 50 Flanders)	19
Belgium (Ultratop 50 Wallonia)	19
Canada (Canadian Hot 100)	22
Denmark (Tracklisten)	11
France (SNEP)	26
Germany (GfK)	30
Greece Digital Songs (Billboard)	7
Hungary (Rádiós Top 40)	14
Ireland (IRMA)	3
Italy (FIMI)	61
Netherlands (Dutch Top 40)	30
Netherlands (Single Top 100)	25
New Zealand (Recorded Music NZ)	6
Scottish Singles Sales (Official Charts)	5
Slovakia Airplay (ČNS IFPI)	25
Sweden (Sverigetopplistan)	46
Switzerland (Schweizer Hitparade)	26
UK Dance (Official Charts)	2
UK Singles (Official Charts)	4
US Billboard Hot 100	43
US Bubbling Under R&B/Hip-Hop Singles (Billboard)	1
US Dance Airplay (Billboard)	9
US Dance Club Songs (Billboard)	1
US Latin Pop Airplay (Billboard)	39
US Rhythmic Airplay (Billboard)	38

=== Year-end charts ===
2011 year-end chart performance for "Beautiful People"
Chart (2011)	Position
Australia (ARIA)	50
Belgium (Ultratop Flanders)	63
Belgium (Ultratop Wallonia)	96
Canada (Canadian Hot 100)	84
France (SNEP)	85
Netherlands (Single Top 100)	97
Romania (Romanian Top 100)	82
UK Singles (OCC)	16
US Dance Club Songs (Billboard)	8

== Certifications ==
Certifications for "Beautiful People"
Region	Certification	Certified units/sales
Australia (ARIA)	2× Platinum	140,000^{^}
Denmark (IFPI Danmark)	Gold	15,000^{^}
Germany (BVMI)	Gold	150,000^{‡}
New Zealand (RMNZ)	Gold	7,500^{*}
Norway (IFPI Norway)	2× Platinum	20,000^{*}
Sweden (GLF)	Platinum	40,000^{‡}
United Kingdom (BPI)	2× Platinum	1,200,000^{‡}
United States (RIAA)	Platinum	1,000,000^{‡}
Streaming
Denmark (IFPI Danmark)	Gold	50,000^{†}
^{*} Sales figures based on certification alone.^{^} Shipments figures based on certification alone.^{‡} Sales+streaming figures based on certification alone.^{†} Streaming-only figures based on certification alone.

== Radio and release history ==
Country	Date	Version	Format	Label
Australia	December 25, 2010	Single version	Contemporary hit radio	Sony Music Entertainment
Australia	December 26, 2010	Single version	Digital download	Sony Music Entertainment
Canada	December 26, 2010	Single version	Digital download	Sony Music Entertainment
Ireland	December 26, 2010	Single version	Digital download	Sony Music Entertainment
New Zealand	December 26, 2010	Single version	Digital download	Sony Music Entertainment
France	December 27, 2010	Single version	Digital download	Sony Music Entertainment
United States	December 28, 2010	Single version	Urban contemporary radio	Jive Records
Norway	December 29, 2010	Single version	Digital download	Sony Music Entertainment
Belgium	December 30, 2010	Single version	Digital download	Sony Music Entertainment
Netherlands	December 30, 2010	Single version	Digital download	Sony Music Entertainment
United Kingdom	April 12, 2011	Digital Remix EP	Digital download	RCA Records
United States	April 12, 2011	Digital Remix EP	Digital download	Jive Records
Germany	May 27, 2011	Single version	CD single	Sony Music Entertainment

== See also ==
- List of number-one dance singles of 2011 (U.S.)
