= Alle Benassi =

Italian DJ, songwriter, and record producer

- Born: Alessandro Benassi
- Origin: Reggio Emilia, Italy
- Occupations: DJ; songwriter; record producer
- Years active: 1980s–present
- Member of: Benassi Bros.

Alessandro "Alle" Benassi is an Italian DJ, songwriter and record producer, best known as a member of Benassi Bros. and as a co-writer of several hits for Chris Brown.

== Career ==
Benassi and his cousin Benny Benassi began DJing in their home town of Reggio Emilia in the 1980s. In the mid-1990s, they started working for Larry Pignagnoli's Off Limits production company. There, they produced music for several acts, including Whigfield. Alessandro Benassi did writing and arrangements for the 2002 album Whigfield 4.

Alessandro and Benny Benassi then released a number of albums under the name Benassi Bros.: Hypnotica (2003), Pumphonia (2004), and ...Phobia (2005).

He later went on to produce the album “Rock the Dog” (2008)[under the name Mobbing] and to co-write a number of songs for Chris Brown, including "Beautiful People" (2011) and "Don't Wake Me Up" (2012).

== Songwriting credits ==
Year	Artist	Song	Co-written with	U.S. peak position	U.K. peak position
2003	Benny Benassi	"Satisfaction"	—	—	2
2003	Benny Benassi	"Able to Love"	Benny Benassi, Dhany	—	—
2011	Chris Brown	"Beautiful People"	Chris Brown, Benny Benassi, Jean Baptiste	43	4
2012	Chris Brown	"Don't Wake Me Up"	Chris Brown, Alain Whyte, Brian Kennedy, Jean Baptiste, Benny Benassi, Michael McHenry, Nick Marsh, Priscilla Hamilton, Ryan Buendia, William Orbit	9	2
2012	Madonna	"Girl Gone Wild"	Madonna, Benny Benassi, Jenson Vaughan	106	73
2012	Madonna	"I'm Addicted"	Madonna, Benny Benassi	—	—
2012	Madonna	"Best Friend"	Madonna, Benny Benassi	—	—
