= Pumphonia =

Studio album by Benassi Bros.
- Released: 2004
- Genres: Electro, Techno
- Length: 56:43
- Label: Energy Production

Benassi Bros. chronology
Pumphonia (2004)	...Phobia (2005)

Pumphonia is the debut album by Italian electronic music duo Benassi Bros., released in 2004.

== Track listing ==
No.	Title	Length
1.	"Illusion (Sfaction version)" (featuring Sandy (Alle Benassi; Daniela Galli; Marco Benassi))	5:06
2.	"Turn Me Up (Sfaction version)" (featuring Sandy (Alle Benassi; Daniela Galli; Marco Benassi; Paul Sears))	5:47
3.	"Rumenian (original version)" (featuring Violeta (Alle Benassi; Violeta Bratu; Marco Benassi))	4:55
4.	"Get Better (Sfact Reloaded version)" (featuring Sandy (Alle Benassi; Daniela Galli; Marco Benassi))	5:32
5.	"The Liar (original version)" (featuring The Biz (Alle Benassi; Daniela Galli; G. Pignagnoli; M. "Pocho" Soncini; Marco Benassi))	4:56
6.	"Memory of Love (original version)" (featuring Paul French (Alle Benassi; Daniela Galli; Marco Benassi; P. Caiti))	5:28
7.	"I Feel So Fine (Sfaction version)" (featuring Sandy (Alle Benassi; A. Gordon; Daniela Galli; Marco Benassi; Paul Sears))	5:22
8.	"I Love My Sex (SfactRum version)" (featuring Violeta (Alle Benassi; Alfredo Larry Pignagnoli; Violeta Bratu; Marco Benassi))	3:10
9.	"Hit My Heart (Sfaction version)" (featuring Dhany (Alle Benassi; Daniela Galli; Marco Benassi))	5:06
10.	"Time Is What You Need (original version)" (featuring Paul French (Alle Benassi; Daniela Galli; Marco Benassi))	3:48
11.	"Don't Touch Too Much (original version)" (featuring Paul French (Alle Benassi; Alfredo Larry Pignagnoli; Daniela Galli; Marco Benassi; Paul Sears))	3:30
12.	"Get Better (Sflow version)" (featuring Sandy (Alle Benassi; Daniela Galli; Marco Benassi))	4:03
