= Benny Benassi =

Italian DJ and producer (born 1967)

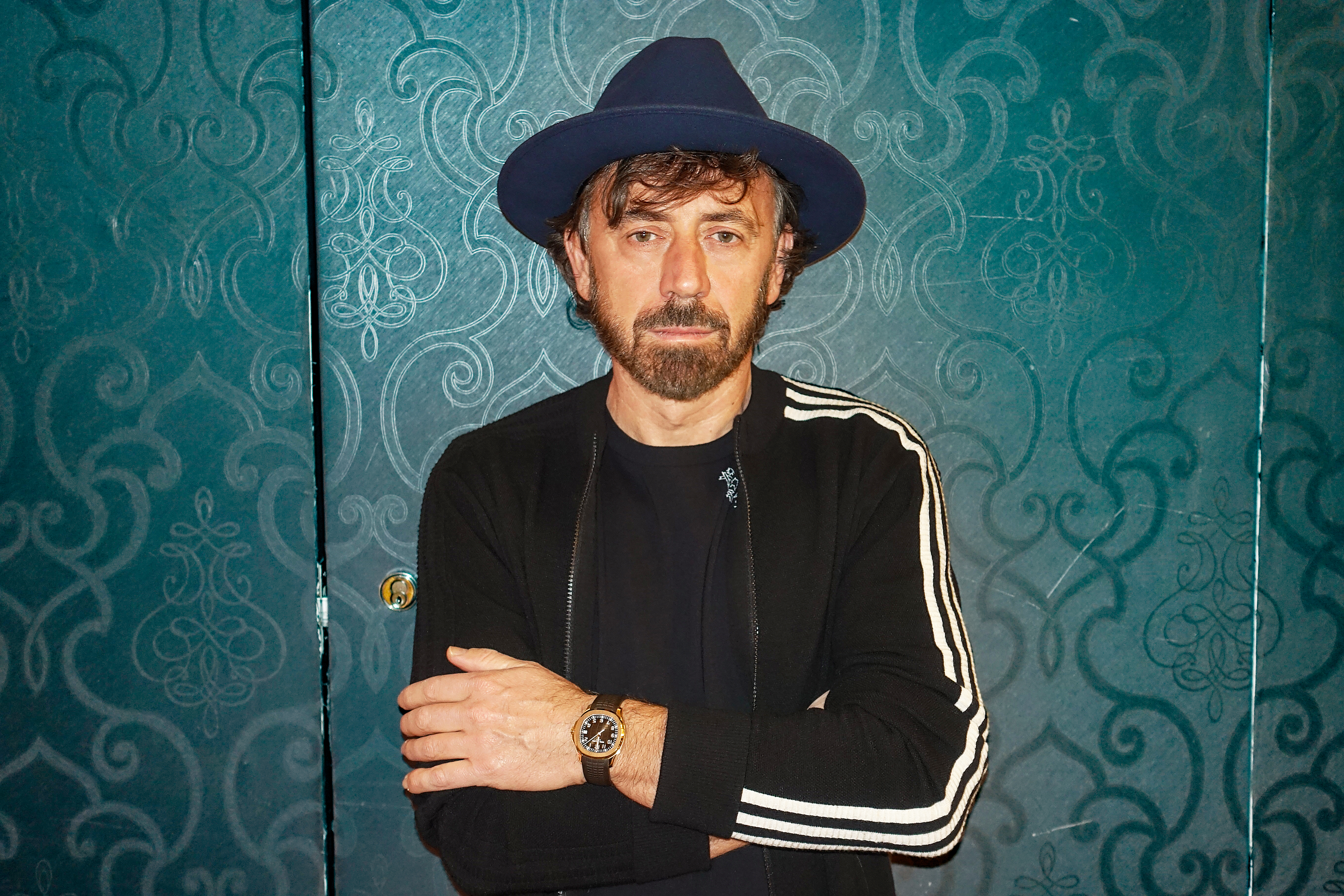
- Benassi in 2020

Background information
- Also known as: Benny B.; Benny Bee; KMC; Benassi Bros.; Blue Storm; AL.BEN; Bat67; FB
- Born: Marco Benassi; 13 July 1967 (age 59); Milan, Italy
- Origin: Reggio Emilia, Italy
- Genres: EDM; house; electro house; progressive house; microhouse
- Occupations: DJ; record producer; remixer
- Instruments: Keyboards; synthesizer; music sequencer; drum machine; turntables
- Years active: 1985–present
- Labels: Energy Prod. – D:Vision; Airplay; Ministry of Sound; Ultra
- Member of: Benassi Bros.
- Website: bennybenassi.com

Marco "Benny" Benassi (Italian pronunciation: [ˈmarko ˈbɛnni beˈnassi]; born 13 July 1967) is an Italian DJ and music producer. He is widely seen as a pioneer of electro house, a genre brought into the mainstream by his 2002 summer club hit "Satisfaction".

He started his career as DJ along with his cousin Alessandro "Alle" Benassi, forming the electronica duo Benassi Bros. Although he began to gain popularity with his pseudonym in 1997 by releasing the song "Electric Flying", his first international hit was "I Feel So Fine", launched in 2001 under the nickname KMC.

In 2003, Benassi released his debut solo-album, Hypnotica, to positive reviews. Known as a pioneer album for electro-house, it incorporates electroclash sounds, many elements of house music and MacInTalk voices, and won the European Border Breakers Award. The following year, the debut album of the Benassi Bros., Pumphonia, was released. Their track "Illusion" became very popular in the American club scene, finally peaking at number 4 on Hot Dance Club Play. Following "Hit My Heart" peaked at 15.

In 2008, his remix of Public Enemy's "Bring the Noise" won the Grammy Award for Best Remixed Recording at the 50th Grammy Awards. In 2009, Benassi also entered the Top 100 DJs list from DJ Mag at #26, while in 2011 was rated #7 on DJ Poll Top 100 by DJ List web site.

== Career ==
=== Early days ===
A native of Milan, Benassi was raised in Reggio Emilia. His musical influences included Giorgio Moroder, Depeche Mode and Orchestral Manoeuvres in the Dark. Benassi started DJing alongside cousin Alle Benassi in the late 1980s in their hometown, before moving to Larry Pignagnoli's Off Limits production studio in the mid-1990s, creating music for various acts, including Whigfield, J.K. and Ally & Jo. In 2001, Benassi, under the name KMC, released his first hit called "I Feel So Fine", with vocals by Dhany. The track first climbed the charts in Benassi's native Italy, and soon became a #1 hit in the UK club charts.

Moving from house to electro, "Satisfaction" took Benassi's success worldwide a year later with high-profile DJs like Carl Cox, Darren Emerson, and Roger Sanchez offering praises. The track reached #2 in the UK Singles Chart after the Ministry of Sound record company replaced the original video (an almost still picture of the band, overlaid with graphics) with a video of models using power tools.

=== 2003–04: Hypnotica ===
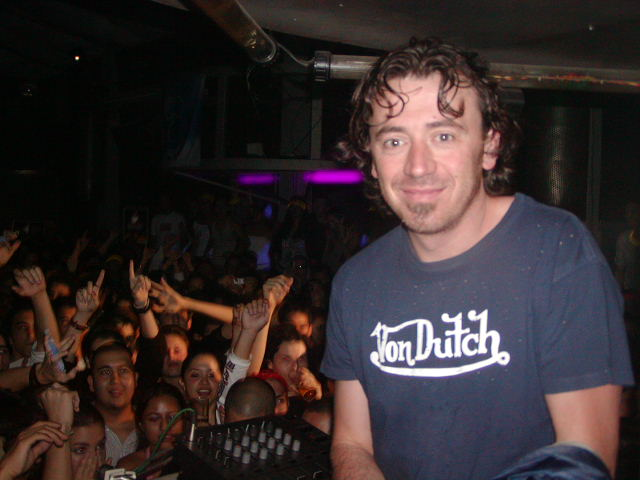
Benassi in El Salvador, 2004

In 2003 Benny Benassi released his first solo debut album Hypnotica (he won the European Border Breakers Award in 2005 which racked up the most sales for an Italian album outside Italy).

=== 2005–07: Pumphonia and …Phobia ===
Benassi often works with vocalists Paul French and Violeta, who are collectively known as The Biz. He produced a group with cousin Alle, called Benassi Bros., a project designed to shine the spotlight on the two Biz vocalists, Paul French and Violeta Claudia and other guest singers. A year after the release of Hypnotica, the album Pumphonia marked their first full-length release, and in 2005, Benassi Bros. released their second album …Phobia.

Some of Benassi's singles have charted high in the United Kingdom and have been played worldwide in clubs. Remixes for OutKast, Goldfrapp, and Felix da Housecat followed. Benassi also remixes music of his contemporaries, such as Tomcraft and Fischerspooner.

In 2005, Benassi founded the record label Pump-Kin Music. The focus of the label is primarily new and unsigned producers. The stated aim of the venture is to give exposure to some of the lesser known DJ/production talent across the world.

In August 2007, Benassi released a remix of Public Enemy's "Bring the Noise". The video for the track was created by Eclectic Method and features a montage of live footage from Public Enemy. It premiered on imeem.com. In February 2008, "Bring the Noise" won a Grammy for best Remix (Dance).

=== 2008–09: Rock 'n' Rave ===
His album Rock 'n' Rave was released on 16 June 2008. The first single from the album was "I Am Not Drunk."

Benassi also broadcasts the one-hour long The Benny Benassi Show on Sirius XM Radio's channel Area. In 2009, he worked with Madonna on a remix for her single "Celebration" which was included on the official music video for the song.

On 28 October 2009, DJ Magazine announced the results of their annual Top 100 DJ Poll, with Ultra Records artist Benny Benassi placed #26, 13 spots higher than the previous year.

=== 2010–14: Electroman ===
In 2010, Benassi released "Electro Sixteen", a video for Benny Benassi vs. "Iggy Pop", "Electro Sixteen," published by Ultra Records, which is an experimental music video featuring more than 15,000 photographs from his DJ set at New York's Electric Zoo Festival.

On 24 May 2010 "Spaceship", which featured Kelis, apl.de.ap and Jean-Baptiste, was selected as the Song of the Day on About.com, with the site calling Benassi's production "tight and melodic, [while] Kelis turns in a fantastic performance." The single was released via digital download on 21 August and charted at #18 on the UK Dance singles chart on 28 August."

On 23 January 2011, Benny Benassi released the music video for "Electroman", a single featuring T-Pain.

Benassi produced the track "Beautiful People", off Chris Brown's 2011 album F.A.M.E. and off Benassi's album Electroman, released June 7 the same year. Electroman includes several singles, such as "Cinema", "Electroman", "Spaceship" and "Control".

In 2012, Benassi worked a second time with Chris Brown. He contributed to "Don't Wake Me Up" which was released as the fourth single of Brown's fifth studio album Fortune. Benny Benassi also worked with Madonna, producing three tracks for her latest album MDNA: Second single "Girl Gone Wild", "I'm Addicted" and "Best Friend" (the latter is a track which can be found on the deluxe edition of the album). In addition, Benassi produced "Stardust", a track of British recording artist Mika's recently released studio album The Origin of Love. Next to them, Benny Benassi produced Anjulie latest single "You & I".

In 2013, Benassi collaborated with John Legend and Heather Bright respectively for the songs "Dance the Pain Away" and "Ghost". In 2014, he released the single "Shooting Helicopters", featuring Serj Tankian.

=== 2015–present ===
In 2016, Benassi worked again with Chris Brown, releasing "Paradise", which was later included in his fourth studio album Danceaholic. The album also features collaborations with Richard Judge, Marc Benjamin, Vassy, and Christian Burns.

On June 28, 2018, he collaborated with the duo Sofi Tukker for the single "Everybody Needs a Kiss".

Benassi is managed by Paul Sears for Cock an Ear and Dave Frank for Milk & Honey Music.

== Discography ==
Studio albums

- Hypnotica (2003)
- Rock 'n' Rave (2008)
- Electroman (2011)
- Danceaholic (2016)
- Feel the Bass (2026)

== Awards and nominations ==
Award	Year	Nominee(s)	Category	Result	Ref.
Electronic Dance Music Awards	2026	Benny Benassi	Male Icon Award	Won	
Grammy Awards	2008	"Bring the Noise" (Benny Benassi Sfaction Remix)	Best Remixed Recording, Non-Classical	Won	
International Dance Music Awards	2004	"Satisfaction"	Best House/Garage Track	Nominated	
International Dance Music Awards	2012	"Beautiful People" (with Chris Brown)	Best R&B/Urban Dance Track	Nominated	
International Dance Music Awards	2012	"Cinema" (with Gary Go)	Best Electro/Tech House Track	Nominated	
International Dance Music Awards	2012	"Cinema" (with Gary Go)	Best Dubstep/DnB/Jungle Track	Nominated	
International Dance Music Awards	2012	Benny Benassi	Best Remixer	Nominated	
NRJ Music Awards	2004	Benny Benassi	International Breakthrough of the Year	Nominated	

Year	Award	Nominee(s)	Category	Result	Ref.
2004	European Border Breakers Award	Hypnotica	Italy	Won	
2005	Record Awards	Hypnotica	Foreign Album of the Year	Won	
2005	Record Awards	"Hit My Heart"	Foreign Hit of the Year	Nominated	
2005	Record Awards	"Hit My Heart"	Ringtone of the Year	Nominated	

=== DJ Magazine's Top 100 DJs ===
Year	Position	Notes	Ref.
2004	18	New Entry	
2006	26	—N/a	
2007	32	—N/a	
2008	39	—N/a	
2009	26	—N/a	
2010	26	Non-Mover	
2011	27	—N/a	
2012	70	—N/a	
2013	89	—N/a	

== See also ==
- 'Benassi pumping'
