= Dhany =

- Born: Daniela Galli; 23 October 1972 (age 53)
- Origin: Italy
- Genres: House, trance
- Occupations: Singer, songwriter
- Years active: 1990–present
- Website: dhany.it

Daniela Galli (Italian: [daˈnjɛːla ˈɡalli]) (born 23 October 1972), also known as Dhany, is an Italian singer and songwriter. She is most known for her work with the Benassi Bros. music project.

== Discography ==
=== Studio albums ===
- Quiero Respirar (2000)
- E-Motions (2007)

=== Singles ===
==== As lead artist ====
- 1998: "Dha Dha Tune"
- 1999: "Quiero Respirar"
- 2000: "Shut Up"
- 2006: "Miles of Love"
- 2007: "Let It Go"
- 2008: "U & I"

==== As featured artist ====
Year	Single	Peak chart positions							Album
Year	Single	FIN	FRA	GER	ITA	NED	SUI	UK	Album
1995	"Somebody to Touch Me" (KMC featuring Dhany)	—	—	—	—	—	—	85	Singles only
1996	"Street Life" (KMC featuring Dhany)	—	—	—	—	—	—	—	Singles only
2000	"I Wanna Be Free" (vs. Mumm)	—	—	—	46	—	—	—	Singles only
2000	"I Need Your Love" (with Tech-Nique)	—	—	—	—	—	—	—	
2001	"I Feel So Fine" (KMC featuring Dhany)	—	—	—	—	—	—	33	
2002	"Run to Me" (with AL.BEN)	—	—	—	—	—	—	—	
2004	"Hit My Heart" (Benassi Bros. featuring Dhany)	—	11	—	50	34	48	—	
2005	"Make Me Feel" (Benassi Bros. featuring Dhany)	—	21	96	—	—	80	—	
2005	"Every Single Day" (Benassi Bros. featuring Dhany)	9	23	—	—	—	97	—	
2005	"Rocket in the Sky" (Benassi Bros. featuring Dhany)	—	48	—	—	—	—	—	
2024	"Electricity" (Samus Jay featuring Dhany)	—	—	—	—	—	—	—	
2024	"Know That I Remember" (Dhany X Annerley X Sandy)	—	—	—	—	—	—	—	
"—" denotes releases that did not chart
