= El Gran Show season 16 =

El Gran Show
- Season 16
- Hosted by: Gisela Valcárcel; Aldo Díaz; Miguel Arce
- Judges: Morella Petrozzi; Pachi Valle Riestra; Carlos Cacho; Michelle Alexander
- Celebrity winner: Rosángela Espinoza
- Professional winner: Lucas Piro
- No. of episodes: 13

Release
- Original network: América Televisión
- Original release: July 30 – October 22, 2016

Season chronology
- ← Previous; Season 15 Next → Season 17

Season two of the 2016 edition of El Gran Show premiered on July 30, 2016.

On October 22, 2016, model & reality TV star Rosángela Espinoza and Lucas Piro were declared the winners, model, singer & actress Leslie Shaw and Oreykel Hidalgo finished second, while model & reality TV star Melissa Paredes and Sergio Álvarez finished third.

== Cast ==
=== Couples ===
On July 30, 2016, seven celebrities were presented in a special episode. The rest of celebrities were announced in the first week, being the former contestant Leslie Shaw, Erick Sabater and Rosángela Espinoza. It was also presented to the professional dancers, being Marianela Pereyra and Toño Tafur new to the show.

Celebrity	Notability (known for)	Professional Partner (Note: During Week 5, the celebrities performed with a different professional partner as part of the "Partner Switch-Up" for that week only. All celebrities returned to their original partners on Week 6.)	Status	Ref.
Darlene Bernaola	Playboy Playmate	Toño Tafur	Eliminated 1st on August 20, 2016	
Erick Sabater	Model & reality TV star	Marianela Pereyra	Eliminated 2nd on August 27, 2016	
Andrea Llosa	Journalist & TV host	Ítalo Valcárcel; Sergio Álvarez (week 5)	Eliminated 3rd on September 10, 2016	
Santi Lesmes	Producer & TV panelist	Michelle Vallejos	Eliminated 4th on September 17, 2016	
Orlando Fundichely	Actor & TV host	Mariale Pineda; Tathi Lira (week 5)	Eliminated 5th on October 1, 2016	
Luis "Cuto" Guadalupe	Former football player	Thati Lira; Mariale Pineda (week 5)	Eliminated 6th on October 15, 2016	
Angie Arizaga	Model & reality TV star	Rodrigo Viola	Eliminated 7th on October 22, 2016	
Melissa Paredes	Model & reality TV star	Sergio Álvarez; Anselmo Pedraza (week 5)	Third place on October 22, 2016	
Leslie Shaw	Singer, model & actress	Oreykel Hidalgo; Lucas Piro (week 5) (Note: Shaw also danced with Anselmo Pedraza (weeks 1–4), Emanuel Colombo (weeks 6–8) and Jorge Ávila (week 9))	Runner-up on October 22, 2016	
Rosángela Espinoza	Model & reality TV star	Lucas Piro; Ítalo Valcárcel (week 5) (Note: Espinoza also danced with Jorge Válcarcel (week 7))	Winners on October 22, 2016	

=== Host and judges ===
Gisela Valcárcel and Aldo Díaz returned as hosts while Jaime "Choca" Mandros being replaced by Miguel Arce as co-host. Morella Petrozzi, Carlos Cacho, Michelle Alexander, Pachi Valle Riestra and the VIP Jury returned as judges.

== Scoring charts ==
Couple	Place	1	2	3	4	5	6	7	8	9	10	11	12 (Note: In this week, the dances scores were not shown, announcing only the position in which each couple finished.)	
Couple	Place	1	2	3	4	5	6	7	8	9	10	11	Top 4	Top 3
Rosángela & Lucas	1	30	34	24	40	35	36	36	30	31	57	82	Safe	Winners
Leslie & Oreykel	2	30	34	25	30	35	40	32	28	29	59	73	Safe	Runner-up
Melissa & Sergio	3	31	26	25	34	38	38	33	28	31	55	78	Safe	Third place
Angie & Rodrigo	4	27	30	22	29	38	37	36	25	25	50	71	Eliminated	
Cuto & Thati	5	28	28	22	32	32	35	27	28	25	47	64		
Orlando & Mariale	6	31	29	28	32	35	34	33	25	26				
Santi & Michelle	7	28	23	24	28	35	32	34						
Andrea & Ítalo	8	21	25	22	30	29	28							
Erick & Marianela	9	26	27	20	27									
Darlene & Toño	10	22	25	19										

Red numbers indicate the sentenced for each week
Green numbers indicate the best steps for each week
the couple was eliminated that week
the couple was safe in the duel
the couple was eliminated that week and safe with a lifeguard
the winning couple
the runner-up couple
the third-place couple

=== Average score chart ===
This table only counts dances scored on a 40-point scale.

Rank by average	Place	Couple	Total points	Number of dances	Average
1	1	Rosángela & Lucas	459	13	35.3
2	2	Leslie & Oreykel	444	13	34.2
2	3	Melissa & Sergio	441	13	33.9
4	4	Angie & Rodrigo	417	13	32.1
5	6	Orlando & Mariale	286	9	31.8
6	5	Cuto & Thati	391	13	30.1
7	7	Santi & Michelle	209	7	29.9
8	8	Andrea & Ítalo	154	6	25.7
9	9	Erick & Marianela	102	4	25.5
10	10	Darlene & Toño	71	3	23.7

=== Highest and lowest scoring performances ===
The best and worst performances in each dance according to the judges' 40-point scale are as follows:

Dance	Highest scored dancer(s)	Highest score	Lowest scored dancer(s)	Lowest score
Jazz	Angie Arizaga	37	Erick Sabater; Darlene Bernaola	25
Latin pop	Rosángela Espinoza	36	Erick Sabater	25
Salsa	Rosángela Espinoza	39	Melissa Paredes	26
Merengue	Angie Arizaga	32	Andrea Llosa	20
Cumbia	Rosángela Espinoza	37	Darlene Bernaola	22
Guaracha	Andrea Llosa	24	—	—
Festejo	Rosángela Espinoza	36	Luis "Cuto" Guadalupe	27
Reggaeton	Orlando Fundichely	36	Erick Sabater	26
Disco	Angie Arizaga	32	Andrea Llosa	27
Double dance	Melissa Paredes	38	Andrea Llosa	27
Paso doble	Santi Lesmes	34	—	—
Samba	Angie Arizaga	34	—	—
Bachata	Rosángela Espinoza	39	Leslie Shaw	37
Tango	Orlando Fundichely	31	—	—
Pachanga	Rosángela Espinoza; Angie Arizaga	35	Luis "Cuto" Guadalupe	26
Quebradita	Leslie Shaw	35	Melissa Paredes	33
Cha-cha-cha	Rosángela Espinoza; Leslie Shaw	37	Luis "Cuto" Guadalupe	29
Conceptual dance	Leslie Shaw	39	Luis "Cuto" Guadalupe	28
Dance improvisation	Rosángela Espinoza	37	Angie Arizaga; Luis "Cuto" Guadalupe	32
World dances	Rosángela Espinoza	39	Angie Arizaga	32

=== Couples' highest and lowest scoring dances ===
Scores are based upon a potential 40-point maximum.

Couple	Highest scoring dance(s)	Lowest scoring dance(s)
Rosángela & Lucas	Bachata & Salsa (39)	Cumbia (29)
Leslie & Oreykel	Rumba (39)	Latin pop & Salsa (29)
Melissa & Sergio	Salsa (38)	Salsa (26)
Angie & Rodrigo	Jazz & Salsa (37)	Jazz (26)
Cuto & Thati	Jazz (35)	Pachanga (26)
Orlando & Mariale	Reggaeton (36)	Latin pop (28)
Santi & Michelle	Paso doble (35)	Cumbia (23)
Andrea & Ítalo	Disco & Jazz (28)	Merengue (20)
Erick & Marianela	Cumbia & Reggaeton (26)	Jazz & Latin pop (25)
Darlene & Toño	Jazz (25)	Cumbia (22)

== Weekly scores ==
Individual judges' scores in the charts below (given in parentheses) are listed in this order from left to right: Morella Petrozzi, Carlos Cacho, Michelle Alexander, Pachi Valle Riestra, VIP Jury.

=== Week 1: First Dances ===
The couples danced cumbia, jazz, latin pop, merengue or salsa.

Running order

Couple	Scores	Dance	Music	Result
Angie & Rodrigo	27 (8, 7, 4, 7, +1)	Jazz	"Taboo"—Don Omar	Safe
Santi & Michelle	28 (8, 7, 4, 8, 0)	Latin pop	"Boom, boom"—Chayanne	Safe
Leslie & Anselmo	30 (8, 8, 5, 8, +1)	Latin pop	"Será, Será (Las Caderas No Mienten)"—Shakira feat. Wyclef Jean	Safe
Cuto & Thati	28 (7, 8, 5, 7, +1)	Salsa	"Tu Cariñito"—Puerto Rican Power	Safe
Andrea & Ítalo	21 (5, 7, 3, 5, +1)	Merengue	"Muchacho Malo"—Olga Tañon	Sentenced
Erick & Marianela	26 (7, 7, 5, 6, +1)	Jazz	"Watch Out for This (Bumaye)"—Daddy Yankee	Safe
Melissa & Sergio	31 (8, 8, 6, 8, +1)	Jazz	"On the Floor"—Jennifer Lopez feat. Pitbull	Best steps
Orlando & Mariale	31 (8, 8, 6, 8, +1)	Salsa	"Gozando en La Habana"—La Charanga Habanera	Best steps
Rosángela & Lucas	30 (8, 8, 6, 7, +1)	Cumbia	"Loquita"—Márama	Safe
Darlene & Toño	22 (6, 6, 4, 6, 0)	Cumbia	"Mentirosa"—Ráfaga	Sentenced

=== Week 2: Party Night ===
The couples performed one unlearned dance and a danceathon of cumbia.

Running order

Couple	Scores	Dance	Music	Result
Leslie & Anselmo	32 (9, 8, 6, 8, +1)	Cumbia	"La Culebrítica"—Grupo 5	Best steps
Santi & Michelle	23 (7, 6, 3, 7, 0)	Cumbia	"Lárgate"—Hermanos Yaipén	Sentenced
Melissa & Sergio	26 (8, 7, 4, 7, 0)	Salsa	"Aguanile"—Marc Anthony	Safe
Darlene & Toño	25 (7, 8, 3, 7, 0)	Jazz*	"Lady Marmalade"—Christina Aguilera, Lil' Kim, Mýa & Pink	Sentenced
Andrea & Ítalo	25 (7, 8, 3, 6, +1)	Guaracha*	"El Yerberito Moderno"—Alquimia la Sonora del XXI	Sentenced
Cuto & Thati	28 (8, 8, 4, 7, +1)	Festejo	"Chacombo"—Arturo "Zambo" Cavero	Safe
Orlando & Mariale	29 (8, 7, 5, 8, +1)	Latin pop	"Salomé"—Chayanne	Safe
Erick & Marianela	27 (7, 8, 4, 7, +1)	Cumbia	"Bombon Asesino"—Alma Bella	Safe
Rosángela & Lucas	34 (9, 9, 7, 8, +1)	Latin pop	"Candela"—Noelia	Best steps
Angie & Rodrigo	30 (9, 8, 5, 8, 0)	Festejo	"Festrónika"—La Fabri-K	Safe
Angie & Rodrigo; Darlene & Toño; Rosángela & Lucas; Orlando & Mariale; Cuto & Thati; Santi & Michelle; Andrea & Ítalo; Melissa & Sergio; Erick & Marianela; Leslie & Anselmo	2	Cumbia (The danceathon)	"Una Cerveza"—Ráfaga	

*The duel

- Andrea & Ítalo: Safe
- Darlene & Toño: Eliminated (but safe with the lifeguard)

=== Week 3: Characterization Night ===
The couples performed one unlearned dance being characterized to popular music icons.

Running order

Couple	Scores	Dance	Music	Characterization	Result
Rosángela & Lucas	24 (9, 6, 8, +1)	Latin pop	"Arrasando"—Thalía	Thalía	Safe
Angie & Rodrigo	22 (8, 6, 8, 0)	Jazz	"Where Have You Been"—Rihanna	Rihanna	Saved
Cuto & Thati	22 (7, 7, 7, +1)	Reggaeton	"Boriqua Anthem"—El General	El General	Sentenced
Andrea & Ítalo	22 (8, 6, 7, +1)	Disco*	"Last Dance"—Donna Summer	Donna Summer	Sentenced
Santi & Michelle	24 (9, 7, 8, 0)	Latin pop*	"Explótame" / "Hay que venir al sur"—Raffaella Carrà	Raffaella Carrà	Safe
Darlene & Toño	19 (7, 5, 6, +1)	Cumbia*	"Techno Cumbia"—Selena	Selena	—
Leslie & Anselmo	25 (9, 8, 7, +1)	Jazz	"Toxic"—Britney Spears	Britney Spears	Safe
Orlando & Mariale	28 (9, 9, 9, +1)	Reggaeton	"Bon, Bon"—Pitbull	Pitbull	Best steps
Melissa & Sergio	25 (9, 8, 7, +1)	Jazz	"Billie Jean"—Michael Jackson	Michael Jackson	Safe
Erick & Marianela	20 (7, 6, 6, +1)	Latin pop	"Este Ritmo Se Baila Así"—Chayanne	Chayanne	Sentenced

*The duel

- Andrea e Ítalo: Safe
- Santi & Michelle: Safe
- Darlene & Toño: Eliminated

=== Week 4: Salsa Night ===
The couples (except those sentenced) danced salsa.

Running order

Couple	Scores	Dance	Music	Result
Melissa & Sergio	34 (9, 9, 7, 8, +1)	Salsa	"Muévete" / "Juana Magdalena"—La Charanga Habanera	Safe
Orlando & Mariale	32 (8, 7, 7, 9, +1)	Salsa	"Temba, Tumba, Timba"—Los Van Van	Safe
Angie & Rodrigo	29 (7, 7, 7, 8, 0)	Salsa	"El Preso"—Fruko y sus Tesos	Sentenced
Erick & Marianela	27 (7, 8, 5, 6, +1)	Reggaeton*	"Quema, Quema"—Aldo y Dandy	—
Andrea & Ítalo	30 (7, 8, 6, 7, +2)	Jazz*	"I Love Rock 'n' Roll"—Britney Spears	Safe
Cuto & Thati	32 (8, 9, 7, 7, +1)	Merengue*	"Juana la Cubana" / "El Negro No Puede"—Las Chicas del Can	Safe
Leslie & Anselmo	30 (7, 7, 7, 8, +1)	Salsa	"Abre Que Voy"—Los Van Van	Safe
Rosángela & Lucas	40 (10, 10, 9, 9, +2)	Salsa	"Que Cosa Tan Linda"—Oscar D'León	Best steps
Santi & Michelle	28 (8, 7, 6, 7, 0)	Salsa	"Cachandea"—Fruko y sus Tesos	Sentenced

*The duel

- Erick & Marianela: Eliminated
- Andrea & Ítalo: Safe
- Cuto & Thati: Safe

=== Week 5: Switch-Up Night ===
The couples (except those sentenced) performed a double dance with a different partner selected by the production.

Running order

Couple	Scores	Dance	Music	Result
Leslie & Lucas	35 (8, 9, 9, 8, +1)	Cumbia; Merengue	"Dos Locos"—Los Villacorta "Kulikitaca"—Toño Rosario	Safe
Rosángela & Ítalo	35 (9, 9, 8, 8, +1)	Cumbia; Merengue	"Me Gusta"—Tommy Portugal y La Pasión "El Beeper"—Oro Solido	Safe
Santi & Michelle	35 (10, 8, 8, 8, +1)	Paso doble*	"He's a Pirate"—Klaus Badelt	Safe
Angie & Rodrigo	38 (10, 9, 9, 9, +1)	Jazz*	"Dirrty"—Christina Aguilera feat. Redman	Best steps
Andrea & Sergio	28 (7, 7, 7, 6, +1)	Cumbia; Merengue	"Así Son los Hombres"—Marina Yafac "Abusadora"—Wilfrido Vargas	Sentenced
Cuto & Mariale	32 (8, 8, 8, 7, +1)	Cumbia; Merengue	"Lejos de Ti"—Orquesta Candela "Una Nalgadita"—Oro Solido	Sentenced
Orlando & Thati	35 (9, 8, 9, 8, +1)	Cumbia; Merengue	"Agonía de Amor"—Dilbert Aguilar y La Tribu "Rompecintura"—Los Hermanos Rosario	Safe
Melissa & Anselmo	38 (9, 10, 9, 9, +1)	Cumbia; Merengue	"Que Paso"—Sonido 2000 "La Cosquillita"—Juan Luis Guerra	Best steps

*The duel

- Santi & Michelle: Eliminated (but safe with the lifeguard)
- Angie & Rodrigo: Safe

=== Week 6: Trio Dances Night ===
The couples (except those sentenced) performed a trio dance involving another celebrity. In the versus, only two couples faced dancing acrobatic salsa, the winner would take two extra points plus the couples who gave their support votes.

Due to personal issues, Anselmo Pedraza withdrew from the competition, so Leslie Shaw danced with Emanuel Colombo since this week.

Running order

Couple (Trio Dance Partner)	Scores	Dance	Music	Result
Angie & Rodrigo (Thiago Cunha)	35 (9, 8, 9, 8, +1)	Samba	"Magalenha"—Sérgio Mendes feat. Carlinhos Brown "Samba do Brasil"—Bellini	Safe
Santi & Michelle (Tati Alcántara)	32 (9, 7, 8, 7, +1)	Cumbia	"No Te Vayas"—Ráfaga	Sentenced
Melissa & Sergio (Jonathan Rojas)	38 (10, 9, 10, 8, +1)	Salsa	"Oye!"—Gloria Estefan	Safe
Leslie & Emanuel (Mario Hart)	38 (9, 10, 9, 9, +1)	Bachata	"Darte un Beso"—Prince Royce	Best steps
Cuto & Thati	35 (8, 9, 10, 7, +1)	Jazz*	"Greased Lightnin'"—John Travolta	Safe
Andrea & Ítalo	28 (7, 8, 7, 5, +1)	Disco*	"Mamma Mia" / "Voulez-Vous"—A*Teens	—
Orlando & Mariale (Karina Rivera)	32 (8, 8, 8, 7, +1)	Tango	"In-tango"—In-Grid	Sentenced
Rosángela & Lucas (Erick Varillas)	36 (9, 8, 9, 9, +1)	Reggaeton	"Culipandeo"—DJ Warner	Safe

The versus
Couple (Supports)	Judges' votes	Dance	Music	Result
Leslie & Emanuel (Orlando, Angie)	Rosangela, Leslie, Rosangela, Leslie, Leslie	Salsa	"Quimbara"—Celia Cruz & Johnny Pacheco	Winners (2 pts)
Rosángela & Lucas (Andrea, Luis, Santi, Melissa)	Rosangela, Leslie, Rosangela, Leslie, Leslie	Salsa	"Quimbara"—Celia Cruz & Johnny Pacheco	Losers

*The duel

- Cuto & Thati: Safe
- Andrea & Ítalo: Eliminated

=== Week 7: Crazy Hour Night ===
The couples (except those sentenced) danced pachanga and a danceathon of cumbia.

Due to an injury, Lucas Piro was unable to perform, so Rosángela Espinoza danced with troupe member Jorge Válcarcel instead.

Running order

Couple	Scores	Dance	Music	Result
Melissa & Sergio	31 (8, 8, 8, 7, 0)	Pachanga	"Teke Teke"—Carlitos Way "Todo el Mundo Está Feliz"—Xuxa	Safe
Leslie & Emanuel	32 (8, 8, 8, 8, 0)	Pachanga	"Mesa Que Más Aplauda"—Climax "Ilarie"—Xuxa	Sentenced
Orlando & Mariale	33 (8, 8, 8, 8, +1)	Salsa*	"Que Se Sepa"—Roberto Roena	Safe
Santi & Michelle	34 (8, 9, 9, 7, +1)	Jazz*	"You Can Leave Your Hat On"—Joe Cocker	—
Cuto & Thati	27 (6, 7, 7, 6, +1)	Pachanga	"Veo Veo"—Los Guajiros del Puerto "Mueve el Totó"—Apache Ness & Me Gusta feat. Juan Quin & Dago	Sentenced
Rosángela & Jorge	36 (9, 9, 9, 8, +1)	Pachanga	"Baile de la Botella"—Joe Luciano "Envidia"—Las Culisueltas	Best steps
Angie & Rodrigo	36 (9, 9, 9, 8, +1)	Pachanga	"La Terecumbia"—Tommy Portugal "Sapito"—Belinda	Best steps
Angie & Rodrigo; Rosángela & Lucas; Orlando & Mariale; Cuto & Thati; Santi & Michelle; Melissa & Sergio; Leslie & Anselmo	2	Cumbia (The danceathon)	"Quiero Amanecer"—Bareto	

*The duel

- Orlando & Mariale: Safe
- Santi & Michelle: Eliminated

=== Week 8: Latin Night ===
The couples (except those sentenced) performed one latin dance. In the versus, the couples faced dancing different dance styles.

Running order

Couple	Scores	Dance	Music	Result
Leslie & Emanuel	28 (9, 9, 9, +1)	Jazz*	"Express" / "Show Me How You Burlesque"—Christina Aguilera	Safe
Cuto & Thati	27 (10, 9, 7, +1)	Jazz*	"Shango"—Habana Night	Safe
Angie & Rodrigo	25 (8, 8, 8, +1)	Merengue	"Es Mentiroso"—Olga Tañon	Sentenced
Orlando & Mariale	24 (7, 8, 8, +1)	Reggaeton	"Impacto"—Daddy Yankee	Sentenced
Rosángela & Lucas	28 (9, 9, 9, +1)	Festejo	"Inga" / "Saca las Manos"—Eva Ayllón	Best steps
Melissa & Sergio	26 (9, 8, 8, +1)	Quebradita	"La Niña Fresa"—Banda Zeta	Safe

The versus
Couples	Judges' votes	Dance	Music	Result
Melissa & Sergio	Melissa, Melissa, Melissa, Angie	Bachata	"Todo Por Tu Amor"—Xtreme	Winners (2 pts)
Angie & Rodrigo	Melissa, Melissa, Melissa, Angie	Bachata	"Dos Locos"—Monchy & Alexandra	Losers
Orlando & Mariale	Orlando, Cuto, Cuto, Orlando	Jazz	"Crazy in Love"—Beyoncé feat. Jay-Z	Tie (1 pt)
Cuto & Thati	Orlando, Cuto, Cuto, Orlando	Jazz	"Run the World (Girls)"—Beyoncé	Tie (1 pt)
Rosángela & Lucas	Rosangela, Leslie, Rosangela, Rosangela	Salsa	"Todo Poderoso"—Eddie Palmieri	Winners (2 pts)
Leslie & Emanuel	Rosangela, Leslie, Rosangela, Rosangela	Salsa	"La Malanga"—Héctor Lavoe	Losers

*The duel

- Cuto & Thati: Safe
- Leslie & Emanuel: Eliminated (but safe with the lifeguard)

=== Week 9: Trio Cha-cha-cha Night ===
The couples (except those sentenced) danced trio cha-cha-cha involving another celebrity and a team dance of cumbia. This week, none couples were sentenced.

Due to personal issues, Emanuel Colombo was unable to perform, so Leslie Shaw danced with troupe member Jorge Ávila instead.

Running order

Couple (Trio Dance Partner)	Scores	Dance	Music	Result
Melissa & Sergio (Kervin Valdizán)	29 (11, 8, 9, +1)	Cha-cha-cha	"Let's Get Loud"—Jennifer Lopez	Best steps
Orlando & Mariale	26 (9, 8, 8, +1)	Salsa*	"Más Macarena"—Gente de Zona feat. Los del Río	—
Angie & Rodrigo	25 (9, 8, 7, +1)	Disco*	"Hush Hush; Hush Hush"—The Pussycat Dolls	Safe
Cuto & Thati (Jhoany Vegas)	23 (8, 7, 7, +1)	Cha-cha-cha	"La Llave de Mi Corazón"—Juan Luis Guerra	Safe
Rosángela & Lucas (Milena Zárate)	29 (10, 10, 8, +1)	Cha-cha-cha	"Corazón Espinado"—Santana feat. Maná	Best steps
Leslie & Jorge (Carlos "Coto" Hernández)	29 (10, 9, 9, +1)	Cha-cha-cha	"Sway"—The Pussycat Dolls	Safe
Angie & Rodrigo; Orlando & Mariale; Leslie & Emanuel	0	Cumbia (Team A)	"He Mentido"—Gran Orquesta Internacional	
Rosángela & Lucas; Cuto & Thati; Melissa & Sergio	2	Cumbia (Team B)	"Me Gusta Todo de Ti"—Gran Orquesta Internacional	

*The duel

- Orlando & Mariale: Eliminated
- Angie & Rodrigo: Safe

=== Week 10: Quarterfinals ===
The couples performed a conceptual dance and a dance improvisation which involved seven different dance styles, all being rehearsed during the week by the couples and only one being chosen by a draw in the live show.

Due to personal issues, Jorge Ávila withdrew from the competition, so Leslie Shaw danced with Oreykel Hidalgo since this week.

Running order

Couple	Scores	Dance (Concept)	Music	Result
Rosángela & Lucas	28 (9, 9, 9, +1)	Latin pop (Madness)	"Loca"—Shakira feat. El Cata	Safe
Rosángela & Lucas	29 (9, 10, 9, +1)	Cumbia	"Viento"—Chacalón	Safe
Melissa & Sergio	28 (9, 9, 9, +1)	Contemporary (Fear)	"Siempre Más Fuerte"—Leslie Shaw	Safe
Melissa & Sergio	27 (9, 9, 8, +1)	Reggaeton	"El Ritmo No Perdona (Prende)"—Daddy Yankee	Safe
Angie & Rodrigo	25 (8, 8, 8, +1)	Latin pop (Passion)	"Qué Ironía"—Jennifer Lopez	Sentenced
Angie & Rodrigo	25 (8, 8, 8, +1)	Festejo	"El Que No Tiene de Inga"—Arturo "Zambo" Cavero	Sentenced
Cuto & Thati	22 (7, 7, 7, +1)	Jazz (Temptation)	"Sexy and I Know It"—LMFAO	Sentenced
Cuto & Thati	25 (9, 8, 7, +1)	Axé	"Paro Paro"—Axé Bahia	Sentenced
Leslie & Oreykel	30 (10, 10, 9, +1)	Rumba (Treason)	"Usted Se Me Llevó La Vida"—Alexandre Pires	Best steps
Leslie & Oreykel	29 (11, 9, 8, +1)	Latin pop	"Livin' la Vida Loca"—Ricky Martin	Best steps

=== Week 11: Semifinals ===
The couples performed the world dances and salsa. This week, none couples were sentenced.

Running order

Couple	Scores	Dance	Music	Result
Melissa & Sergio	38 (9, 10, 10, 8, +1)	(Spain) Rumba flamenca	"Bamboléo" / "Djobi Djoba"—Gipsy Kings	Safe
Melissa & Sergio	40 (9, 10, 11, 9, +1)	Salsa	"Valió la Pena"—Gran Orquesta Internacional	Safe
Rosángela & Lucas	41 (10, 10, 11, 9, +1)	(Dominican Republic) Bachata	"Te Robaré"—Prince Royce	Best steps
Rosángela & Lucas	41 (10, 10, 11, 9, +1)	Salsa	"En Barranquilla Me Quedo"—Gran Orquesta Internacional	Best steps
Angie & Rodrigo	33 (8, 9, 8, 7, +1)	(Saudi Arabia) Belly dance*	"Ojos Así"—Shakira	Safe
Angie & Rodrigo	38 (9, 10, 10, 8, +1)	Salsa	"Ven Morena"—Gran Orquesta Internacional	Safe
Cuto & Thati	35 (8, 9, 10, 7, +1)	(Cuba) Mambo*	"Que Rico el Mambo" / "Mambo No. 8"—Perez Prado	—
Cuto & Thati	29 (7, 7, 8, 7, 0)	Salsa	"La Rebelión"—Gran Orquesta Internacional	—
Leslie & Oreykel	35 (9, 9, 9, 8, 0)	(Mexico) Quebradita	"Juana la Cubana"—Banda Fresnitos	Safe
Leslie & Oreykel	38 (9, 10, 10, 8, +1)	Salsa	"La Salsa Vive"—Gran Orquesta Internacional	Safe

*The duel

- Cuto & Thati: Eliminated
- Angie & Rodrigo: Safe

=== Week 12: Final ===
On the first part, the couples danced freestyle and a trio dance involving another celebrity.

On the second part, the final three couples danced waltz.

Running order (Part 1)

Couple (Trio Dance Partner)	Dance	Music	Result
Rosángela & Lucas (Jhoany Vegas)	Freestyle	"Tanguera"—Sexteto Mayor	Safe
Rosángela & Lucas (Jhoany Vegas)	Festejo	"Este Ritmo de Negro"—Eva Ayllón	Safe
Angie & Rodrigo (Paloma Fiuza)	Freestyle	"Anaconda"—Nicki Minaj / "Sangre caliente"—Euforia	Eliminated
Angie & Rodrigo (Paloma Fiuza)	Axé	"Ota Otes" / "Danza Da Maozinha"—Axé Bahia	Eliminated
Melissa & Sergio (Alexis Descalzo)	Freestyle	"Main Herr"—Liza Minnelli / "Sing, Sing, Sing (With a Swing)"—Benny Goodman	Safe
Melissa & Sergio (Alexis Descalzo)	Samba	"Real in Rio"—from Rio	Safe
Leslie & Oreykel (Carlos "Coto" Hernandez)	Freestyle	"Naughty Girl" / "Beautiful Liar"—Beyoncé	Safe
Leslie & Oreykel (Carlos "Coto" Hernandez)	Reggaeton	"Gasolina"—Daddy Yankee	Safe

Running order (Part 2)

Couple	Dance	Music	Result
Rosángela & Lucas	Waltz	"Unchained Melody"—The Righteous Brothers	Winners
Leslie & Oreykel	Waltz	"I Will Always Love You"—Whitney Houston	Runner-up
Melissa & Sergio	Waltz	"My Heart Will Go On"—Celine Dion	Third place

== Dance chart ==
The celebrities and professional partners will dance one of these routines for each corresponding week:

- Week 1: Cumbia, jazz, latin pop, merengue or salsa (First Dances)
- Week 2: One unlearned dance & the danceathon (Party Night)
- Week 3: One unlearned dance (Characterization Night)
- Week 4: Salsa (Salsa Night)
- Week 5: Double dance (Switch-Up Night)
- Week 6: Trio dances & the versus (Trio Dances Night)
- Week 7: Pachanga & the danceathon (Crazy Hour Night)
- Week 8: One unlearned dance & the versus (Latin Night)
- Week 9: Cha-cha-cha & team dances (Trio Cha-cha-cha Night)
- Week 10: Conceptual dances & dance improvisation (Quarterfinals)
- Week 11: One unlearned dance & salsa (Semifinals)
- Week 12: Freestyle, trio dances & waltz (Finals)

Couple	Week 1	Week 2	Week 3	Week 4	Week 5	Week 6	Week 7	Week 8	Week 9	Week 10		Week 11		Week 12		
Rosángela & Lucas	Cumbia	Latin pop	Latin pop	Salsa	Cumbia; Merengue (Rosángela & Ítalo)	Reggaeton	Pachanga	Festejo	Cha-cha-cha	Latin pop	Cumbia	Bachata	Salsa	Freestyle	Festejo	Waltz
Leslie & Oreykel	Latin pop	Cumbia	Jazz	Salsa	Cumbia; Merengue (Leslie & Lucas)	Bachata	Pachanga	Jazz	Cha-cha-cha	Rumba	Latin pop	Quebradita	Salsa	Freestyle	Reggaeton	Waltz
Melissa & Sergio	Jazz	Salsa	Jazz	Salsa	Cumbia; Merengue (Melissa & Anselmo)	Salsa	Pachanga	Quebradita	Cha-cha-cha	Contemporary	Reggaeton	Rumba flamenca	Salsa	Freestyle	Samba	Waltz
Angie & Rodrigo	Jazz	Festejo	Jazz	Salsa	Jazz	Samba	Pachanga	Merengue	Disco	Latin pop	Festejo	Belly dance	Salsa	Freestyle	Axé	
Cuto & Thati	Salsa	Festejo	Reggaeton	Merengue	Cumbia; Merengue (Cuto & Mariale)	Jazz	Pachanga	Jazz	Cha-cha-cha	Jazz	Axé	Mambo	Salsa			
Orlando & Mariale	Salsa	Latin pop	Reggaeton	Salsa	Cumbia; Merengue (Orlando & Tathi)	Tango	Salsa	Reggaeton	Salsa							
Santi & Michelle	Latin pop	Cumbia	Latin pop	Salsa	Paso doble	Cumbia	Jazz									
Andrea & Ítalo	Merengue	Guaracha	Disco	Jazz	Cumbia; Merengue (Andrea & Sergio)	Disco										
Erick & Marianela	Jazz	Cumbia	Latin pop	Reggaeton												
Darlene & Toño	Cumbia	Jazz	Cumbia													

Modalities of competition
Couple	Week 2	Week 6	Week 7	Week 8	Week 9
Rosángela & Lucas	Cumbia	Salsa	Cumbia	Salsa	Cumbia
Leslie & Oreykel	Cumbia	Salsa	Cumbia	Salsa	Cumbia
Melissa & Sergio	Cumbia	Salsa	Cumbia	Bachata	Cumbia
Angie & Rodrigo	Cumbia	Salsa	Cumbia	Bachata	Cumbia
Cuto & Tathi	Cumbia	Salsa	Cumbia	Jazz	Cumbia
Orlando & Mariale	Cumbia	Salsa	Cumbia	Jazz	Cumbia
Santi & Michelle	Cumbia	Salsa	Cumbia		
Andrea & Ítalo	Cumbia	Salsa			
Erick & Marianela	Cumbia				
Darlene & Toño	Cumbia				

Highest scoring dance
Lowest scoring dance
Gained bonus points for winning
Gained no bonus points for losing
Danced, but not scored
In Italic indicate the dances performed in the duel

== Guest judges ==
Since the beginning of this season, a guest judge was present at each week to comment on and rate the dance routines. In the last week were present ten guest judges, who together with the main judges determined the winning couple.

Date	VIP Jury	Occupation(s)	Ref.
August 6, 2016	Rebeca Escribens	Actress & TV host	
August 13, 2016	Yola Polastri	Children's enterteiner	
August 20, 2016	Tilsa Lozano	Model	
August 27, 2016	Fiorella Rodríguez	Actress & TV host	
September 3, 2016	Rebeca Escribens	Actress & TV host	
September 10, 2016	Cecilia Bracamonte	Singer	
September 17, 2016	Rebeca Escribens	Actress & TV host	
September 17, 2016	Gabriel Soto	Actor & model	
September 24, 2016	Magdyel Ugaz	Actress & TV host	
October 1, 2016	Micheille Soifer	Singer	
October 8, 2016	Fiorella Rodríguez	Actress & TV host	
October 8, 2016	Roberto Martínez	Former football player	
October 15, 2016	Sheyla Rojas	Model	
October 22, 2016	Efraín Aguilar	Producer & director	
October 22, 2016	Mateo Chiarella Viale	Theater director	
October 22, 2016	Alfredo Di Natale	Professional dancer, choreographer & art director	
October 22, 2016	Jimmy Gamonet	Professional dancer & art director	
October 22, 2016	Maju Mantilla	Actress, TV host & Miss World 2004	
October 22, 2016	Vania Masias	Professional dancer & choreographer	
October 22, 2016	July Naters	Producer & director	
October 22, 2016	Gina Natteri	Professional dancer, choreographer & art director	
October 22, 2016	Miguel Valladares	Producer & director	
October 22, 2016	Ducelia Woll	Professional dancer & choreographer	
