= El Gran Show season 15 =

El Gran Show
- Season 15
- Hosted by: Gisela Valcárcel; Aldo Díaz; Jaime "Choca" Mandros
- Judges: Morella Petrozzi; Pachi Valle Riestra; Carlos Cacho; Michelle Alexander
- Celebrity winner: Milett Figueroa
- Professional winner: Patricio Quiñones
- No. of episodes: 12

Release
- Original network: América Televisión
- Original release: April 30 – July 23, 2016

Season chronology
- ← Previous; Season 14 Next → Season 16

Season one of the 2016 edition of El Gran Show premiered on April 30, 2017.

In this season returned the 11 golden palette and the lifeguard. In addition, the VIP Jury returned, this time not co-opted by the public, but by a celebrity, which gave couples extra points. This season was also the first to introduce a new segment called "Partner Switch-Up", where each of the celebrities had to leave their original partner and dance with a new professional dancer for a week (a segment similar to Dancing with the Stars used since season 18). In this segment, the show presented "same-sex dance" for the first time.

On July 23, 2016, model & reality TV star Milett Figueroa and Patricio Quiñones were declared the winners, actress & singer Fiorella Cayo and Jimy Garcia finished second, while singer & actor Christian Domínguez and Isabel Acevedo finished third. It was confirmed that from this season, the winning couple would no longer be chosen by the public votes, but by the main judges and ten invited judges.

== Cast ==
=== Couples ===
On April 28, 2016, Melissa Klug was the first celebrity confirmed through a television spot. The rest of celebrities were announced during a special episode, on April 30. In the first week, professional dancers were introduced, including Isabel Acevedo, Diego Alza, José Morello and Patricio Quiñones.

Celebrity	Notability (known for)	Professional partner (Note: During Week 7, the celebrities performed with a different professional partner as part of the "Partner Switch-Up" for that week only. All celebrities, except Cayo and Orbegoso, returned to their original partners on Week 8.)	Status	Ref.
David Villanueva	Actor	Ximena Palomino	Eliminated 1st on May 21, 2016	
Ivana Yturbe	Model & reality TV star	Franco Dulanto	Eliminated 2nd on May 28, 2016	
Brunella Horna	Model & reality TV star	Diego Alza	Eliminated 3rd on June 4, 2016	
Karla Tarazona	TV host & comedian	Lucas Piro	Eliminated 4th on June 25, 2016	
Kike Suero	Comedian	Cielo Lobos	Eliminated 5th on July 2, 2016	
Dorita Orbegoso	Former vedette	José Morello; Jimy Garcia (weeks 1-7)	Eliminated 6th on July 2, 2016	
Juan "Chiquito" Flores	Football player	Manuela Calle; Isabel Acevedo (week 7)	Eliminated 7th on July 9, 2016	
Melissa Klug	TV personality	Ítalo Valcárcel; Patricio Quiñones (week 7) (Note: Klug also danced with Jorge Ávila (weeks 1–3) and Renzo Spraggon (week 4))	Eliminated 8th on July 23, 2016	
Luigi Carbajal	Singer	Thati Lira; Manuela Calle (week 7)	Eliminated 9th on July 23, 2016	
Christian Domínguez	Singer & actor	Isabel Acevedo; Ítalo Valcárcel (week 7)	Third place on July 23, 2016	
Fiorella Cayo	Actress & singer	Jimy Garcia; José Morello (weeks 1-7)	Runner-Up on July 23, 2016	
Milett Figueroa	Model & reality TV star	Patricio Quiñones; Tathi Lira (week 7)	Winners on July 23, 2016	

=== Host and judges ===
Gisela Valcárcel, Aldo Díaz and Jaime "Choca" Mandros returned as hosts, while Morella Petrozzi, Carlos Cacho and Pachi Valle Riestra returned as judges. Michelle Alexander, producer of América Televisión, became the new judge of the show. In addition, the VIP Jury returned, being conformed by a celebrity since this season.

== Scoring charts ==
Couple	Place	1	2	3	4	5	6	7	8	9	10	11 (Note: In this week, the dances scores were not shown, announcing only the position in which each couple finished.)		
Couple	Place	1	2	3	4	5	6	7	8	9	10	Top 5	Top 4	Top 3
Milett & Patricio	1	40	30	33	34	28	33	32	34	40	76	Safe	Safe	Winner
Fiorella & Jimy	2	38	30	32	37	34	31	37	42	36	73	Safe	Safe	Runner-up
Christian & Isabel	3	34	28	31	27	34	31	41	37	35	65	Safe	Safe	Third place
Luigi & Thati	4	29	27	27	34	35	32	33	34	34	76	Safe	Eliminated	
Melissa & Ítalo	5	26	23	21	20	27	27	29	30	30	56	Eliminated		
Chiquito & Manuela	6	30	25	22	32	28	30	32	32	32				
Dorita & José	7	34	28	29	31	31	28	31	37					
Kike & Cielo	8	34	27	22	21	29	24	23	25					
Karla & Lucas	9	30	23	23	26	29	25	30						
Brunella & Diego	10	33	22	24	20	27								
Ivana & Franco	11	26	25	20	28									
David & Ximena	12	28	23	32										

Red numbers indicate the sentenced for each week
Green numbers indicate the best steps for each week
the couple was eliminated that week
the couple was safe in the duel
the couple was eliminated that week and safe with a lifeguard
the winning couple
the runner-up couple
the third-place couple

=== Average score chart ===
This table only counts dances scored on a 40-point scale.

Rank by average	Place	Couple	Total points	Number of dances	Average
1	2	Fiorella & Jimy	368	11	33.5
2	1	Milett & Patricio	359	11	32.6
3	3	Christian & Isabel	346	11	31.5
4	4	Luigi & Thati	345	11	31.4
5	7	Dorita & José	234	8	29.3
6	6	Chiquito & Manuela	251	9	27.9
7	9	Karla & Lucas	176	7	25.1
8	12	David & Ximena	75	3	25.0
9	5	Melissa & Ítalo	274	11	24.9
10	8	Kike & Cielo	197	8	24.6
11	10	Brunella & Diego	116	5	23.2
12	11	Ivana & Franco	91	4	22.8

=== Highest and lowest scoring performances ===
The best and worst performances in each dance according to the judges' 40-point scale are as follows:

Dance	Highest scored dancer(s)	Highest score	Lowest scored dancer(s)	Lowest score
Cumbia	Luigi Carbajal	34	Luigi Carbajal; Juan "Chiquito" Flores	22
Salsa	Christian Domínguez	39	Melissa Klug	18
Jazz	Fiorella Cayo	37	Melissa Klug	19
Reggaeton	Luigi Carbajal	39	Ivana Yturbe	20
Merengue	Luigi Carbajal; Christian Domínguez	34	Ivana Yturbe	19
Quebradita	Fiorella Cayo	35	Christian Domínguez	27
Tango	Juan "Chiquito" Flores	31	Melissa Klug	25
Disco	Juan "Chiquito" Flores	31	Kike Suero	22
Samba	Dorita Orbegoso	28	Melissa Klug	27
Marinera	Brunella Horna	24	—	—
Paso doble	David Villanueva	31	—	—
Bollywood	Milett Figueroa	33	—	—
Double dance	Milett Figueroa	37	Kike Suero	24
Lambada	Karla Tarazona	29	—	—
Mambo	Kike Suero	23	—	—
Contemporary	Milett Figueroa	31	—	—
Tex-mex	Luigi Carbajal	32	—	—
Cha-cha-cha	Fiorella Cayo	39	Juan "Chiquito" Flores	31
Festejo	Dorita Orbegoso	35	—	—
Dance improvisation	Luigi Carbajal	39	Christian Domínguez; Melissa Klug	30

=== Couples' highest and lowest scoring dances ===
Scores are based upon a potential 40-point maximum.

Couple	Highest scoring dance(s)	Lowest scoring dance(s)
Milett & Patricio	Disco/Salsa & Latin pop (37)	Cumbia (28)
Fiorella & Jimy	Cha-cha-cha (39)	Jazz (29)
Christian & Isabel	Salsa (39)	Reggaeton (26)
Luigi & Thati	Reggaeton (39)	Cumbia (22)
Melissa & Ítalo	Bachata (30)	Salsa (18)
Chiquito & Manuela	Jazz (32)	Salsa & Cumbia (22)
Dorita & José	Festejo (35)	Salsa (26)
Kike & Cielo	Salsa (29)	Jazz (21)
Karla & Lucas	Lambada (29)	Salsa (22)
Brunella & Diego	Reggaeton (26)	Jazz (20)
Ivana & Franco	Jazz (27)	Merengue (19)
David & Ximena	Paso doble (31)	Reggaeton (21)

== Weekly scores ==
Individual judges' scores in the charts below (given in parentheses) are listed in this order from left to right: Morella Petrozzi, Carlos Cacho, Michelle Alexander, Pachi Valle Riestra, VIP Jury.

=== Week 1: First Dances ===
The couples danced cumbia, jazz, merengue, reggaeton or salsa. This week, none couples were sentenced.

Running order

Couple	Scores	Dance	Music	Result
Luigi & Thati	29 (6, 7, 3, 6, 7)	Cumbia	"Una Cerveza"—Ráfaga	Safe
Dorita & Jimy	34 (7, 8, 4, 7, 8)	Salsa	"Acuyuyé"—DLG	Safe
Fiorella & José	38 (8, 8, 5, 8, 9)	Jazz	"Dance Again"—Jennifer Lopez feat. Pitbull	Safe
Chiquito & Manuela	30 (7, 6, 3, 6, 8)	Salsa	"La Rebelión"—Joe Arroyo	Safe
Melissa & Jorge	26 (6, 5, 2, 5, 8)	Salsa	"Ya Te Olvidé"—Son Tentación	Safe
Brunella & Diego	33 (7, 7, 4, 7, 8)	Reggaeton	"Roba novios" / "Envidia"—Las Culisueltas	Safe
David & Ximena	28 (6, 6, 3, 6, 7)	Reggaeton	"Drop It on Me"—Ricky Martin feat. Daddy Yankee	Safe
Milett & Patricio	40 (8, 9, 5, 8, 10)	Jazz	"Baby Boy"—Beyoncé	Best steps
Christian & Isabel	34 (7, 8, 4, 7, 8)	Reggaeton	"La Nueva y La Ex"—Daddy Yankee	Safe
Karla & Lucas	30 (7, 7, 3, 6, 7)	Merengue	"El Estúpido"—Juliana O'Neal	Safe
Kike & Cielo	34 (7, 8, 4, 7, 8)	Cumbia	"Mi Chilala"—El Encanto de Corazón	Safe
Ivana & Franco	26 (6, 5, 2, 6, 7)	Merengue	"Loca"—Shakira feat. El Cata	Safe

=== Week 2: Face-off Night ===
The couples were paired in six sets, in each set the couples perform one unlearned dance, only one of the couples in each set would gain one extra point awarded by the VIP judge.

Due to work issues, Kike Suero was unable to perform, so Cielo Lobos danced with Carlos Álvarez instead (former contestant on season 1 of the 2015).

Running order

Couple	Scores	Dance	Music	Result
Brunella & Diego	22 (6, 7, 2, 6, +1)	Salsa	"Taleto de TV"—Willie Colón	Sentenced
Carlos & Cielo	27 (8, 8, 4, 7, 0)	Cumbia	"Parranda Provinciana"—Orquesta Candela	Safe
Christian & Isabel	28 (7, 7, 4, 9, +1)	Quebradita	"El Uca Uca"—Banda Pelillos	Safe
Karla & Lucas	23 (7, 6, 3, 7, 0)	Reggaeton	"El Ritmo No Perdona (Prende)"—Daddy Yankee	Safe
Ivana & Franco	25 (7, 7, 4, 7, 0)	Cumbia	"No Te Vayas"—Ráfaga	Safe
Melissa & Jorge	23 (6, 7, 3, 6, +1)	Jazz	"Mujer Latina"—Thalía	Sentenced
Luigi & Thati	27 (8, 8, 4, 7, 0)	Jazz	"Love"—Kazaky	Safe
Dorita & Jimy	28 (8, 8, 4, 7, +1)	Tango	"In-tango"—In-Grid	Safe
Fiorella & José	30 (8, 9, 5, 8, 0)	Salsa	"Ta' Bueno Ya"—Albita Rodríguez	Best steps
Milett & Patricio	30 (8, 9, 5, 7, +1)	Salsa	"Bemba Colora"—Celia Cruz	Best steps
David & Ximena	23 (7, 6, 4, 6, 0)	Cumbia	"El Arbolito"—Grupo Néctar	Sentenced
Chiquito & Manuela	25 (7, 7, 3, 7, +1)	Reggaeton	"Candy"—Plan B	Safe

=== Week 3: Party Night ===
The couples performed one unlearned dance.

Running order

Couple	Scores	Dance	Music	Result
Kike & Cielo	22 (6, 6, 4, 6, 0)	Disco	"Stayin' Alive"—Bee Gees	Safe
Dorita & Jimy	29 (7, 8, 6, 7, +1)	Samba	"Magalenha"—Sérgio Mendes feat. Carlinhos Brown	Safe
Luigi & Thati	27 (7, 6, 6, 7, +1)	Merengue	"Soltero y Sabroso"—Los Sabrosos del Merengue	Safe
Brunella & Diego	24 (7, 6, 4, 7, 0)	Marinera*	"Chiclayanita"—Banda de la PNP	Safe
Melissa & Jorge	21 (7, 5, 2, 6, +1)	Merengue*	"Yo No Soy una Loba" / "El Negro No Puede"—Las Chicas del Can	Sentenced
David & Ximena	32 (8, 8, 8, 7, +1)	Paso doble*	"Lloraré las Penas"—David Bisbal	—N/a
Milett & Patricio	33 (9, 9, 6, 8, +1)	Merengue	"Abusadora"—Wilfrido Vargas	Best steps
Christian & Isabel	31 (8, 8, 6, 8, +1)	Salsa	"El Preso"—Fruko y sus Tesos	Safe
Karla & Lucas	23 (6, 6, 4, 6, +1)	Salsa	"Oye!"—Gloria Estefan	Safe
Fiorella & José	32 (8, 8, 6, 9, +1)	Cumbia	"Elsa"—Agua Bella	Safe
Chiquito & Manuela	22 (7, 6, 2, 7, 0)	Cumbia	"La Culebrítica"—Grupo 5	Safe
Ivana & Franco	20 (7, 5, 2, 6, 0)	Reggaeton	"Ella Se Arrebata"—Latin Fresh	Sentenced

*The duel

- Brunella & Diego: Safe
- Melissa & Jorge: Safe
- David & Ximena: Eliminated

=== Week 4: Characterization Night ===
The couples (except those sentenced) performed one unlearned dance being characterized to popular music icons.

Due to work issues, Christian Dominguez was unable to perform, so Isabel Acevedo danced with Andrés "Andy V" Olano instead (former contestant on season 1 of 2012).

Running order

Couple	Scores	Dance	Music	Characterization	Result
Dorita & Jimy	31 (8, 8, 8, 7, 0)	Jazz	"Crazy in Love"—Beyoncé feat. Jay-Z	Beyoncé	Safe
Kike & Cielo	21 (6, 5, 4, 6, 0)	Jazz	"Thriller"—Michael Jackson	Michael Jackson	Safe
Fiorella & José	37 (10, 9, 9, 8, +1)	Jazz	"Falsas Esperanzas"—Christina Aguilera	Christina Aguilera	Best steps
Ivana & Franco	28 (7, 7, 6, 7, +1)	Jazz*	"Se Dice de Mí"—Yolanda Rayo		—N/a
Melissa & Renzo	20 (6, 5, 3, 5, +1)	Jazz*	"Esa Hembra es Mala"—Gloria Trevi		Sentenced
Brunella & Diego	20 (6, 5, 3, 6, 0)	Jazz	"...Baby One More Time"—Britney Spears	Britney Spears	Sentenced
Karla & Lucas	26 (7, 6, 6, 7, 0)	Jazz	"Poker Face"—Lady Gaga	Lady Gaga	Safe
Milett & Patricio	34 (9, 8, 8, 8, +1)	Jazz	"Será, Será (Las Caderas No Mienten)"—Shakira	Shakira	Safe
Chiquito & Manuela	32 (8, 8, 8, 7, +1)	Disco	"I Will Survive"—Gloria Gaynor	Gloria Gaynor	Safe
Andy V & Isabel	27 (7, 7, 6, 7, 0)	Cumbia	"Viento"—Chacalón	Chacalón	Safe
Luigi & Thati	34 (8, 8, 8, 9, +1)	Salsa	"Llorarás"—Oscar D'León	Oscar D'León	Safe

*The duel

- Ivana & Franco: Eliminated
- Melissa & Renzo: Safe

=== Week 5: Versus Night ===
The couples were paired off into five sets, with each set of couples performing the same dance to different songs, only one of the couples in each set would gain an extra point awarded by the VIP judge.

Running order

Couple	Scores	Dance	Music	Result
Dorita & Jimy	31 (7, 8, 8, 7, +1)	Cumbia	"La Caderona"—Los Villacorta	Safe
Milett & Pato	28 (7, 7, 7, 7, 0)	Cumbia	"El Tao Tao"—Grupo 5	Sentenced
Fiorella & José	34 (8, 9, 8, 8, +1)	Cumbia	"El Siki Siki"—Euforia	Safe
Chiquito & Manuela	28 (6, 8, 7, 7, 0)	Cumbia	"Sangre Caliente"—Euforia	Sentenced
Brunella & Diego	27 (6, 7, 6, 7, +1)	Reggaeton*	"Ahora es"—Wisin & Yandel	—N/a
Melissa & Ítalo	27 (7, 7, 6, 7, 0)	Reggaeton*	"Limbo"—Daddy Yankee	Sentenced
Luigi & Thati	35 (8, 9, 9, 8, +1)	Merengue	"Kulikitaka"—Merenglass	Best steps
Christian & Isabel	34 (8, 9, 9, 8, 0)	Merengue	"La Cosquillita"—Juan Luis Guerra	Safe
Karla & Lucas	29 (7, 7, 7, 7, +1)	Salsa	"Timbalero"—El Gran Combo de Puerto Rico	Safe
Kike & Cielo	29 (6, 8, 8, 7, 0)	Salsa	"Aguanile"—Marc Anthony	Safe

*The duel

- Brunella & Diego: Eliminated
- Melissa & Ítalo: Safe

=== Week 6: Double Dance Under the Rain ===
The couples (except those sentenced) performed a double dance (strip dance/merengue house) under the rain.

Michelle Alexander could not be present on this week's live show, so Santi Lesmes (guest judge in week 4) replaced her. For this reason there was no VIP judge present.

Running order

Couple	Scores	Dance	Music	Result
Milett & Patricio	33 (8, 9, 7, 9)	Bollywood*	"1, 2, 3, 4 Get on the Dance Floor"—from Chennai Express "Jai Ho! (You Are My Destiny)"—A. R. Rahman & The Pussycat Dolls	Best steps
Chiquito & Manuela	30 (8, 8, 6, 8)	Salsa*	"Lo Que Tengo Yo"—Los 4 feat. La Charanga Habanera	Safe
Melissa & Ítalo	27 (7, 7, 6, 7)	Samba*	"Conga"—Miami Sound Machine	Safe
Dorita & Jimy	28 (7, 8, 6, 7)	Strip dance Merengue house	"Worth It"—Fifth Harmony feat. Kid Ink "La Morena"—Ilegales	Safe
Luigi & Thati	32 (8, 8, 7, 9)	Strip dance Merengue house	"SexyBack"—Justin Timberlake "Funkete"—El General	Safe
Fiorella & José	31 (8, 9, 7, 7)	Strip dance Merengue house	"Buttons"—The Pussycat Dolls feat. Snoop Dogg "El Tiburón"—Proyecto Uno	Safe
Christian & Isabel	31 (8, 7, 8, 8)	Strip dance Merengue house	"La Tortura"—Shakira feat. Alejandro Sanz "Está Pegao"—Proyecto Uno	Safe
Karla & Lucas	25 (7, 6, 6, 6)	Strip dance Merengue house	"Beautiful Liar"—Beyoncé feat. Shakira "Taqui Taqui"—Ilegales	Sentenced
Kike & Cielo	24 (7, 6, 5, 6)	Strip dance Merengue house	"Sexy and I Know It"—LMFAO "Fiesta Caliente"—Ilegales	Sentenced

*The duel

- Milett & Patricio: Safe
- Juan & Manuela: Eliminated (but safe with the lifeguard)
- Melissa & Ítalo: Safe

=== Week 7: Switch-Up Night ===
The celebrities (except sentenced) performed one unlearned dance with a different partner selected by the production. Because last week the show could not be broadcast for the Copa América Centenario, the production decided that three couples were sentenced to eliminate two of them at the next week.

Running order

Couple	Scores	Dance	Music	Result
Melissa & Patricio	29 (7, 7, 7, 7, +1)	Salsa	"Muévete"—DLG	Sentenced
Chiquito & Isabel	32 (7, 7, 9, 8, +1)	Tango	"Por Una Cabeza"—Carlos Gardel & Alfredo Le Pera	Safe
Karla & Lucas	30 (8, 7, 7, 7, +1)	Lambada*	"Dançando Lambada"—Kaoma	—N/a
Kike & Cielo	23 (6, 6, 5, 6, 0)	Mambo*	"Jump in the Line (Shake, Señora)"—Harry Belafonte	Sentenced
Milett & Thati	32 (8, 8, 8, 7, +1)	Contemporary	"Chandelier"—Sia	Safe
Luigi & Manuela	33 (8, 8, 8, 8, +1)	Tex-mex	"No Tengo Dinero"—Kumbia Kings feat. Juan Gabriel & El Gran Silencio	Safe
Christian & Ítalo	41 (10, 10, 10, 9, +2)	Salsa	"La Salsa Llegó"—Sonora Carruseles	Best steps
Dorita & José	31 (8, 7, 7, 7, +2)	Salsa	"La Malanga"—Eddie Palmieri	Sentenced
Fiorella & Jimy	37 (9, 9, 9, 8, +2)	Quebradita	"La Quebradora"—Banda El Recodo	Safe

*The duel

- Karla & Lucas: Eliminated
- Kike & Cielo: Safe

=== Week 8: Trio Cha-cha-cha Night ===
The couples (except those sentenced) danced trio cha-cha-cha involving another celebrity.

Running order

Couple (Trio Dance Partner)	Scores	Dance	Music	Result
Milett & Patricio (Álvaro Stoll)	34 (9, 8, 8, 8, +1)	Cha-cha-cha	"Smooth"—Santana feat. Rob Thomas	Safe
Dorita & José	37 (9, 9, 9, 8, +2)	Festejo*	"Se Me Van los Pies"—Etiqueta Negra	—N/a
Kike & Cielo	25 (7, 7, 5, 6, 0)	Jazz*	"El Rock de la Cárcel"—Enrique Guzmán	—N/a
Melissa & Ítalo	30 (7, 8, 8, 6, +1)	Jazz*	"Pégate"—Ricky Martin	Sentenced
Christian & Isabel (Stephanie Orúe)	37 (9, 8, 10, 8, +2)	Cha-cha-cha	"¿Quién será?"—Jaime Cuadra	Safe
Fiorella & Jimy (Macs Cayo)	42 (11, 10, 10, 9, +2)	Cha-cha-cha	"Perhaps, Perhaps, Perhaps"—The Pussycat Dolls	Best steps
Chiquito & Manuela (Karen Dejo)	32 (8, 8, 8, 7, +1)	Cha-cha-cha	"Ríe y Llora"—Celia Cruz	Sentenced
Luigi & Thati (Natalia Salas)	34 (8, 9, 8, 8, +1)	Cha-cha-cha	"La Llave de Mi Corazón"—Juan Luis Guerra	Safe

*The duel

- Dorita & José: Eliminated
- Kike & Cielo: Eliminated
- Melissa & Ítalo: Safe

=== Week 9: Quarterfinals ===
The couples (except sentenced couples) performed a double dance. In the little train, only the celebrities faced dancing strip dance.

Running order

Couple	Scores	Dance	Music	Result
Christian & Isabel	34 (9, 8, 9, 8, 0)	Rock and roll Festejo	"La Plaga"—Enrique Guzmán "Ingá"—Eva Ayllón	Safe
Milett & Patricio	38 (10, 9, 9, 9, +1)	Disco; Salsa	"Last Dance"—Donna Summer "Brujería"—El Gran Combo de Puerto Rico	Best steps
Chiquito & Manuela	32 (8, 8, 8, 8, 0)	Jazz*	"Men in Black"—Will Smith feat. Coko	—N/a
Melissa & Ítalo	30 (7, 8, 7, 7, +1)	Cumbia*	"No Juegues con el Diablo"—Bareto	Sentenced
Fiorella & Jimy	36 (9, 9, 9, 8, +1)	Contemporary; Mambo	"Diamonds"—Rihanna "Mambo Jambo"—Pérez Prado	Safe
Luigi & Thati	33 (9, 9, 8, 7, 0)	Rumba flamenca Reggaeton	"Bamboléo"—Gipsy Kings "Veo Veo"—Guajiros	Sentenced

The little train
Participants	Judges' votes	Dance	Music	Winner(s)
Women	Milett, Milett, Milett, Milett	Strip dance	"Naughty Girl"—Beyoncé	Milett (2 pts)
Men	Luigi, Luigi, Christian, Christian	Strip dance	"100% Pure Love"—Crystal Waters	Christian, Luigi (1 pt)

*The duel

- Juan & Manuela: Eliminated
- Melissa & Ítalo: Safe

=== Week 10: Semifinals ===
The couples danced jazz and a dance improvisation which involved seven different dance styles, all being rehearsed during the week by the couples and only one being chosen by a draw in the live show.

Due to work issues, Luigi Carbajal could not be present on the live show, so their dance in the first round was recorded a day before the show so that the judges could scored it. In the dance improvisation round, Thati Lira danced with Thiago Cunha instead.

Running order

Couple	Scores	Dance	Music	Result
Christian & Isabel	34 (8, 8, 9, 8, +1)	Jazz	"La Mordidita"—Ricky Martin feat. Yotuel Romero	Sentenced
Christian & Isabel	31 (8, 7, 8, 7, +1)	Saya	"Negrita"—Los Kjarkas	Sentenced
Fiorella & Jimy	39 (10, 9, 9, 9, +2)	Jazz	"I'm a Slave 4 U"—Britney Spears	Safe
Fiorella & Jimy	34 (8, 8, 8, 8, +2)	Axé	"Dandalunda"—Exporto Brasil	Safe
Milett & Pato	37 (9, 9, 9, 9, +1)	Jazz	"Run the World (Girls)"—Beyoncé	Best steps
Milett & Pato	39 (9, 9, 10, 9, +2)	Latin pop	"Marimar"—Thalía	Best steps
Melissa & Ítalo	25 (6, 7, 6, 6, 0)	Tango*	"El Tango de Roxanne"—Moulin Rouge!	Sentenced
Melissa & Ítalo	31 (7, 9, 7, 7, +1)	Bachata	"Darte un Beso"—Prince Royce	Sentenced
Luigi & Thati	35 (8, 9, 9, 8, +1)	Cumbia*	"Colegiala" / "El Baile de la Culebra"—Skandalo	Best steps
Thiago & Thati	41 (10, 10, 10, 9, +2)	Reggaeton	"Mueve el Totó"—Apache Ness & Me Gusta feat. Juan Quin & Dago	Best steps

*The duel

- Melissa & Ítalo: Safe
- Luigi & Thati: Eliminated (but safe with the lifeguard)

=== Week 11: Final ===
On the first part, the couples danced freestyle.

On the second part, the remaining couples danced trio salsa involving another celebrity.

On the third part, the final three couples performed one unlearned ballroom dance.

Running order (Part 1)

Couple	Dance	Music	Result
Melissa & Ítalo	Freestyle	"Woman del Callao"—Juan Luis Guerra	Eliminated
Christian & Isabel	Freestyle	"Quiéreme"—Johnny Sky / "Muévete" / "Juana Magdalena"—La Charanga Habanera	Safe
Milett & Patricio	Freestyle	"Ain't It Funny" / "Let's Get Loud"—Jennifer Lopez	—N/a
Luigi & Thati	Freestyle	"She Bangs"—Ricky Martin	—N/a
Fiorella & Jimy	Freestyle	"All of Me"—John Legend	—N/a

Running order (Part 2)

Couple (Trio Dance Partner)	Dance	Music	Result
Milett & Patricio (Sergio Lois)	Salsa	"Quimbara"—Celia Cruz & Johnny Pacheco	Safe
Luigi & Tathi (Claudia Portocarrero)	Salsa	"El Chico Chévere"—Albita Rodríguez	Eliminated
Fiorella & Jimy (Franco Cabrera)	Salsa	"En Barranquilla Me Quedo"—Joe Arroyo	Safe
Christian & Isabel (Diana Sánchez)	Salsa	"La Salsa Vive"—Tito Nieves	Safe

Running order (Part 3)

Couple	Dance	Music	Result
Christian & Isabel	Rumba	"(I've Had) The Time of My Life"—Bill Medley feat. Jennifer Warnes	Third place
Fiorella & Jimy	Quickstep	"You're the One That I Want"—John Travolta feat. Olivia Newton-John	Runner-up
Milett & Patricio	Tango	"Flashdance... What a Feeling"—Irene Cara	Winners

== Dance chart ==
The celebrities and professional partners will dance one of these routines for each corresponding week:

- Week 1: Cumbia, jazz, merengue, reggaeton or salsa (First Dances)
- Week 2: One unlearned dance (Face-off Night)
- Week 3: One unlearned dance (Party Night)
- Week 4: One unlearned dance (Characterization Night)
- Week 5: One unlearned dance or learned (Versus Night)
- Week 6: Double dance under the rain (Double Dance Under the Rain)
- Week 7: One unlearned dance (Switch-Up Night)
- Week 8: Trio Cha-cha-cha (Trio Cha-cha-cha Night)
- Week 9: Double dance & the little train (Quarterfinals)
- Week 10: Jazz & dance improvisation (Semifinals)
- Week 11: Freestyle, trio salsa & ballroom dances (Final)

Couple	Week 1	Week 2	Week 3	Week 4	Week 5	Week 6	Week 7	Week 8	Week 9		Week 10		Week 11		
Milett & Patricio	Jazz	Salsa (vs. Fiorella & José)	Merengue	Jazz	Cumbia (vs. Dorita & Jimy)	Bollywood	Contemporary (Milett & Thati)	Cha-cha-cha	Disco; Salsa	Strip dance	Jazz	Latin pop	Freestyle	Salsa	Tango
Fiorella & Jimy	Jazz	Salsa (vs. Milett & Patricio)	Cumbia	Jazz	Cumbia (vs. Chiquito & Manuela)	Strip dance Merengue house	Quebradita (Fiorella & Jimy)	Cha-cha-cha	Contemporary; Mambo	Strip dance	Jazz	Axé	Freestyle	Salsa	Quickstep
Christian & Isabel	Reggaeton	Quebradita (vs. Karla & Lucas)	Salsa	Cumbia	Merengue (vs. Luigi & Thati)	Strip dance Merengue house	Salsa (Christian & Ítalo)	Cha-cha-cha	Rock and roll Festejo	Strip dance	Jazz	Saya	Freestyle	Salsa	Rumba
Luigi & Thati	Cumbia	Jazz (vs. Dorita & Jimy)	Merengue	Salsa	Merengue (vs. Christian & Isabel)	Strip dance Merengue house	Tex-mex (Luigi & Manuela)	Cha-cha-cha	Rumba flamenca Reggaeton	Strip dance	Cumbia	Reggaeton	Freestyle	Salsa	
Melissa & Ítalo	Salsa	Jazz (vs. Ivana & Franco)	Merengue	Jazz	Reggaeton (vs. Brunella & Diego)	Samba	Salsa (Melissa & Patricio)	Jazz	Cumbia	Strip dance	Tango	Bachata	Freestyle		
Chiquito & Manuela	Salsa	Reggaeton (vs. David & Ximena)	Cumbia	Disco	Cumbia (vs. Fiorella & José)	Salsa	Tango (Juan & Isabel)	Cha-cha-cha	Jazz	Strip dance					
Dorita & José	Salsa	Tango (vs. Luigi & Thati)	Samba	Jazz	Cumbia (vs. Milett & Patricio)	Strip dance Merengue house	Salsa (Dorita & José)	Festejo							
Kike & Cielo	Cumbia	Cumbia (vs. Brunella & Diego)	Disco	Jazz	Salsa (vs. Karla & Lucas)	Strip dance Merengue house	Mambo	Jazz							
Karla & Lucas	Merengue	Reggaeton (vs. Christian & Isabel)	Salsa	Jazz	Salsa (vs. Kike & Cielo)	Strip dance Merengue house	Lambada								
Brunella & Diego	Reggaeton	Salsa (vs. Carlos & Cielo)	Marinera	Jazz	Reggaeton (vs. Melissa & Ítalo)										
Ivana & Franco	Merengue	Cumbia (vs. Melissa & Jorge)	Reggaeton	Jazz											
David & Ximena	Reggaeton	Cumbia (vs. Juan & Manuela)	Paso doble												

Highest scoring dance
Lowest scoring dance
Gained bonus points for winning
Gained no bonus points for losing
Danced, but not scored
In Italic indicate the dances performed in the duel

== Guest judges ==
Since the beginning of this season, a guest judge was present at each week to comment on and rate the dance routines. In the last week were present ten guest judges, who together with the main judges determined the winning couple.

Date	VIP Jury	Occupation(s)	Ref.
May 7, 2016	Laura Huarcayo	TV host & model	
May 14, 2016	Carlos Carlín	Actor, comedian & TV host	
May 21, 2016	Tilsa Lozano	Model	
May 28, 2016	Santi Lesmes	Producer & TV commentator	
June 4, 2016	Milena Zárate	Singer	
June 25, 2016	Mariella Zanetti	Former vedette & actress	
July 2, 2016	Sofía Franco	TV host	
July 9, 2016	Yola Polastri	Children's entertainer	
July 16, 2016	Karen Schwarz	Actress & TV host	
July 23, 2016	Efraín Aguilar	Producer	
July 23, 2016	Bruno Ascenzo	Actor, writer & director	
July 23, 2016	Franco Benza	Producer, choreographer & Art director	
July 23, 2016	Mateo Chiarella Viale	Theater director	
July 23, 2016	Alfredo Di Natale	Professional dancer & dance director	
July 23, 2016	Jimmy Gamonet	Professional dancer & Art director	
July 23, 2016	Mávila Huertas	Journalist	
July 23, 2016	Gina Natteri	Professional dancer & dance director	
July 23, 2016	Federico Salazar	Journalist & writer	
July 23, 2016	Ducelia Woll	Professional dancer	
