= Mama mia (In-Grid song) =

"Mama Mia"

Single by In-Grid

from the album Voila!
- Released: 2005
- Genre: Dance-pop
- Length: 3:41
- Label: Universal
- Songwriters: Marco Soncini, Ingrid Alberini
- Producer: Alfredo Larry Pignagnoli

In-Grid singles chronology
"Mama Mia" (2005)	"Le Coquin" (2005)

Music video
- "Mama mia" on YouTube

"Mama Mia" is a single of an Italian artist In-Grid. It was released in 2005.

A Spanish-English version of the song was also released.

== Lyrics ==
The lyrics were written by In-Grid and Marco Soncini, who co-produced the song with Alfredo Larry Pignagnoli. The English version was also co-written by Daniela Galli (also known as Dhany) and Paul Sears.

== Charts ==
=== Weekly charts ===
Weekly chart performance for "Mama mia"
Chart (2005)	Peak position
CIS Airplay (TopHit)	7
Germany (GfK)	88
Netherlands (Single Top 100)	52
Russia Airplay (TopHit)	8

=== Year-end charts ===
2005 year-end chart performance for "Mama mia"
Chart (2005)	Position
CIS (TopHit)	37
Russia Airplay (TopHit)	38

2006 year-end chart performance for "Mama mia"
Chart (2006)	Position
CIS (TopHit)	112
Russia Airplay (TopHit)	136

=== Decade-end charts ===
Decade-end chart performance for "Mama mia"
Chart (2000–2009)	Position
Russia Airplay (TopHit)	188
