= La vie en rose (In-Grid album) =

Studio album by In-Grid
- Released: August 2004
- Genre: Pop; chanson; chill-out
- Language: French
- Label: ZYX Music
- Producer: Larry Pignagnoli

In-Grid chronology
Rendez-vous (2004)	La vie en rose (2004)	Voila! (2005)

Singles from La vie en rose
- 1. "Milord" Released: 7 September 2004

La vie en rose is the second studio album by Italian singer In-Grid. It was released in 2004, by ZYX Music. The album includes cover versions of French chanson schlagers.

The album was a success in Poland, where it reached the second place in the chart and received a gold certification.

== Editions ==
There are several versions of editions: for example, for Eastern European countries on the album cover, the singer is depicted against the background of the Eiffel Tower to evoke associations with France; on the cover for Western European countries, the singer is depicted lying in rose petals, referring to the album title, the name Chilling With In-Grid was also added to the album title. In addition to the covers, the editions differed in the order of the tracks, some songs also had different arrangements and duration in different versions.

== Track listing ==
No.	Title	Writer(s)	Length
1.	"Milord"	Georges Moustaki; Marguerite Monnot	3:29
2.	"La Vie en rose"	Edith Piaf; Louiguy	3:30
3.	"Les Champs-Élysées" (Dance Version)	Pierre Delanoë	3:23
4.	"Accordeonist"	Michel Emer	4:15
5.	"Un beau roman (Une belle histoire)"	Delanoë; Michel Fugain	3:59
6.	"Chanson D'Amour"	Wayne Shanklin	3:20
7.	"Un homme et une femme"	Francis Lai; Pierre Barouh	4:03
8.	"Les Feuilles Mortes"	Jacques Prevert; Joseph Kosma	3:59
9.	"Ne me quitte pas"	Jacques Brel	3:52
10.	"La Mer"	Charles Trenet	3:49
11.	"Et maintenant"	Delanoë; Gilbert Becaud	4:16
12.	"Non, je ne regrette rien"	Charles Dumont; Michel Vaucaire	4:12
13.	"Les Champs-Élysées"	Delanoë	3:46
Total length:			53:45

== Charts ==
Chart (2004)	Peak position
Czech Albums (ČNS IFPI)	33
Polish Albums (ZPAV)	2

== Certifications ==
Region	Certification	Certified units/sales
Poland (ZPAV)	Gold	20,000^{*}
^{*} Sales figures based on certification alone.
