= Rendez-vous (In-Grid album) =

- International edition cover art

Studio album by In-Grid
- Released: 14 April 2003
- Recorded: 2001–2003
- Genre: Pop; eurodance; house
- Label: ZYX Music
- Producer: Larry Pignagnoli

In-Grid chronology
Rendez-vous (2003)	La vie en rose (2004)

Singles from Rendez-vous
- 1. "Tu es foutu" Released: 19 December 2001; 2. "In-Tango" Released: 20 May 2003; 3. "Shock" Released: 31 October 2003; 4. "Ah l'amour, l'amour" Released: 23 August 2004

Rendez-vous is the debut studio album by Italian singer In-Grid. It was released on 14 April 2003, by ZYX Music. The first two singles "Tu es foutu" and "In-Tango" gained European success, topping the charts in several countries. The album received platinum certifications in Poland and Russia.

In 2004, the album won in the nomination "Foreign Album of the Year" of the Russian Record Award.

== Track listing ==
Rendez-vous – Standard edition
No.	Title	Writer(s)	Length
1.	"In-tango"	Ingrid Alberini; Marco Soncini; Elena Bianchi; Giuseppe Isgrò	3:25
2.	"Tu es foutu"	Alberini; Soncini	3:36
3.	"Mais la nuit... il dort"	Alberini; Igor Favretto	3:43
4.	"Shock"	Alberini; Soncini	3:33
5.	"Dans ma mémoire"	Alberini; Alessandro Magnanini; Channing Banks; Giovanna Bersola	3:43
6.	"Pour toujours"	Alberini; Soncini; Banks	3:53
7.	"Souvenir d'été"	Alberini; Banks; Daniela Galli; Daniele Sala; Alle Benassi	3:30
8.	"I'm folle de toi"	Alberini; Soncini; Banks	3:34
9.	"Je ne crois pas"	Alberini; Magnanini	3:19
10.	"Esclave de toi"	Alberini; Magnanini	3:31
11.	"Ah l'amour l'amour"	Alberini; Andrea Bettini; Bianchi; Isgrò	3:27
12.	"Va au diable"	Alberini; Davide Del Vasto; Luigi Manzi; Nicola Agostinelli; Paul Sears	3:20

Rendez-vous – International edition (bonus tracks)
No.	Title	Length
13.	"You Promised Me"	3:39
14.	"Tu es foutu" (Chill-Our RMX)	3:49

Rendez-vous – Dutch edition (bonus tracks)
No.	Title	Length
13.	"In-tango" (Extended Version)	4:25
14.	"Tu es foutu" (Loungest Radio Edit)	4:02
15.	"Tu es foutu" (Video)	3:36
16.	"In-tango" (Video)	3:25

Rendez-vous – Special edition (bonus tracks)
No.	Title	Length
13.	"You Promised Me"	3:39
14.	"Tu es foutu" (Chill-Our RMX)	3:49
15.	"Tu es foutu" (Colour's Rain Minibeat Edit)	4:03
16.	"You Promised Me" (Miami Grazin Dub)	6:51
17.	"You Promised Me" (Harlem Mustlers Club Mix)	7:34
18.	"You Promised Me" (Extended Mix)	5:58

Rendez-vous – US edition – English version
No.	Title	Length
1.	"You Promised Me"	3:44
2.	"We Tango Alone"	3:33
3.	"More & More"	3:47
4.	"In-Shock"	3:10
5.	"Inside of Me"	3:47
6.	"Evermore"	3:58
7.	"Summer Souvenir"	3:33
8.	"So Folle de Toi"	3:39
9.	"Don't Believe"	3:28
10.	"Slave to Thee"	3:36
11.	"Only Lies"	3:31
12.	"Get Lost"	3:19

== Charts ==
=== Weekly charts ===
Weekly chart performance for Rendez-vous
Chart (2003)	Peak position
Austrian Albums (Ö3 Austria)	23
Czech Albums (ČNS IFPI)	8
European Albums (Music & Media)	68
German Albums (Offizielle Top 100)	27
Hungarian Albums (MAHASZ)	24
Polish Albums (ZPAV)	3
Swedish Albums (Sverigetopplistan)	53
Swiss Albums (Schweizer Hitparade)	41

=== Year-end charts ===
Year-end chart performance for Rendez-vous
Chart (2003)	Position
German Albums (Offizielle Top 100)	84

== Certifications and sales ==
Certifications for Rendez-vous
Region	Certification	Certified units/sales
Poland (ZPAV)	Platinum	70,000^{*}
Russia (NFPF)	5× Platinum	100,000^{*}
^{*} Sales figures based on certification alone.
