= Tu es foutu =

2001 single by In-Grid

"Tu es foutu" / "You Promised Me"

Single by In-Grid

from the album Rendez-vous
- Released: 19 December 2001
- Length: 3:36
- Label: X-Energy
- Songwriters: Marco Soncini; Ingrid Alberini
- Producer: Marco "Pocho" Soncini

In-Grid singles chronology
"I Was a Ye-Ye Girl" (2001)	"Tu es foutu" / "You Promised Me" (2001)	"In-tango" (2003)

Music video
- "Tu es foutu" on YouTube

"Tu es foutu" (English: "You're screwed/fucked") is a song by Italian dancer and singer-songwriter In-Grid. It was released in December 2001 as the lead single from her debut album, Rendez-vous (2003). An English version of the song titled "You Promised Me" (French: "Tu m'as promis") was also released in Australia, the United Kingdom, the United States, and other countries. "Tu es foutu" / "You Promised Me" remains In-Grid's most successful song worldwide, topping the charts of Greece, Hungary, and Sweden and reaching the top 10 in nine other European countries plus Australia.

== Production ==
The lyrics were written by In-Grid and Marco Soncini, who also produced the song. The English version was also co-written by Daniela Galli (also known as Dhany) and Paul Sears.

== Chart performance ==
"Tu es foutu" first charted in Greece in March 2002, reaching number one in June. Throughout the rest of 2002, the song began to appear on more European charts, starting with Switzerland (May), France (June), Italy (July), and the Netherlands (July), becoming a top-three hit in the last nation. In September, the song debuted on Belgium's Flemish Singles Chart, where it rose to the number-two position for four consecutive weeks, and on the Romanian Top 100, where it soon reached number three. The following month, it began its German chart run at number 93, taking 24 weeks to reach its highest position, number nine. In October, the single began to garner radio airplay in Hungary, eventually topping the country's radio chart in February 2003.

In late 2002, "Tu es foutu" charted in the Nordic countries. The song appeared at number 43 on the Swedish Singles Chart on 28 November 2002, then rose up the listing until peaking at number one for two weeks in January 2003. On the final chart week of 2002, it appeared on Norway's VG-lista chart and rose to number three after four more weeks. The song then gained success in Denmark and Finland, reaching number two in the former country and number seven in the latter. In March 2003, it achieved its peak of number 23 on the Eurochart Hot 100. The same month, "You Promised Me" debuted at number 11 in Australia, later peaking at number seven. In New Zealand, "You Promised Me" debuted at number 32 on 8 June and peaked at number 17 the following week. In the United States, the song entered the top 10 on three Billboard dance listings, finding its highest position of number two on the Hot Dance Singles Sales chart.

== Track listings ==
- Italian 12-inch single

A1. "Tu es foutu" (original extended) – 6:01
A2. "Tu es foutu" (original edit) – 3:36
B1. "Tu es foutu" (Harlem Hustlers club mix) – 7:30
B2. "Tu es foutu" (Fisa Fx) – 2:30

- European CD single
1. "Tu es foutu" (original edit) – 3:36
2. "Tu es foutu" (Harlem Hustlers club mix) – 7:30
- European maxi-CD single
1. "Tu es foutu" (original radio edit) – 3:36
2. "Tu es foutu" (original extended) – 6:02
3. "Tu es foutu" (original instrumental) – 6:02
4. "Tu es foutu" (Harlem Hustlers club mix) – 7:30
5. "Tu es foutu" (video) – 3:36
- German maxi-CD single
1. "Tu es foutu" (original radio edit) – 3:39
2. "Tu es foutu" (original extended) – 6:01
3. "Tu es foutu" (Harlem Hustlers club mix) – 7:34
4. "Tu es foutu" (original instrumental) – 6:01
- UK CD single
1. "Tu es foutu" (radio edit) – 3:38
2. "You Promised Me (Tu es foutu)" (vocal edit) – 3:41
3. "Tu es foutu" (R&R club mix) – 6:36
4. "Tu es foutu" (extended mix) – 6:01
- Australian maxi-CD single
1. "You Promised Me (Tu es foutu)" (radio edit) – 3:40
2. "You Promised Me (Tu es foutu)" (extended) – 6:04
3. "Tu es foutu" (original edit) – 3:40
4. "Tu es foutu" (original extended) – 6:02
5. "Tu es foutu" (Chill-Grid) – 3:50
6. "Tu es foutu" (Harlem Hustlers club mix) – 7:34
7. "Tu es foutu" (original instrumental) – 6:02
- US maxi-CD single
1. "You Promised Me" (Roc Project's Mix Show radio edit) – 3:30
2. "You Promised Me" (Johnny Budz Short remix) – 3:40
3. "You Promised Me" (original radio edit) – 3:39
4. "You Promised Me" (Roc 'n' Cato's Teqhouse Dub mix) – 9:13

== Charts ==
=== Weekly charts ===
Chart (2002–2004)	Peak position
Australia (ARIA)	7
Australian Dance (ARIA)	1
Austria (Ö3 Austria Top 40)	6
Belgium (Ultratop 50 Flanders)	2
Belgium (Ultratop 50 Wallonia)	17
Denmark (Tracklisten)	2
Europe (Eurochart Hot 100)	23
Finland (Suomen virallinen lista)	7
France (SNEP)	47
Germany (GfK)	9
Greece (IFPI Greece)	1
Hungary (Rádiós Top 40)	1
Hungary (Single Top 40)	2
Italy (FIMI)	16
Netherlands (Dutch Top 40)	2
Netherlands (Single Top 100)	3
New Zealand (Recorded Music NZ)	14
Norway (VG-lista)	3
Poland (Polish Airplay Charts)	2
Romania (Romanian Top 100)	3
Spain (Promusicae)	16
Sweden (Sverigetopplistan)	1
Switzerland (Schweizer Hitparade)	23
UK Singles (OCC)	200
US Dance Club Songs (Billboard)	6
US Dance Singles Sales (Billboard)	2
US Dance Airplay (Billboard)	4

=== Year-end charts ===
Chart (2002)	Position
Belgium (Ultratop 50 Flanders)	15
Belgium (Ultratop 50 Wallonia)	82
Netherlands (Dutch Top 40)	36
Netherlands (Single Top 100)	22
Sweden (Hitlistan)	59
Switzerland (Schweizer Hitparade)	65

Chart (2003)	Position
Australia (ARIA)	39
Australian Dance (ARIA)	2
Austria (Ö3 Austria Top 40)	26
Germany (Media Control GfK)	22
Sweden (Hitlistan)	13

Chart (2004)	Position
US Dance Radio Airplay (Billboard)	44
US Dance Singles Sales (Billboard)	12

== Certifications ==
Region	Certification	Certified units/sales
Australia (ARIA)	Gold	35,000^{^}
Belgium (BRMA)	Gold	25,000^{*}
Greece (IFPI Greece)	Gold	10,000^{^}
Sweden (GLF)	Gold	15,000^{^}
^{*} Sales figures based on certification alone.^{^} Shipments figures based on certification alone.

== Release history ==
Region	Version	Date	Format(s)	Label(s)	Ref(s).
Various	"Tu es foutu"	19 December 2001	12-inch vinyl; CD	Various	
Australia	"You Promised Me"	10 March 2003	CD	Transistor	
United Kingdom	Both	18 August 2003	12-inch vinyl; CD	All Around the World	
United States	"You Promised Me"	17 February 2004	Contemporary hit radio	Capitol	
