= Voila! =

Voila

Studio album by In-Grid
- Released: September 24, 2005 (Europe)
- Recorded: 2005
- Genre: Pop
- Length: 53:45

In-Grid chronology
| La vie en rose (2004) | Voila (2005) | Passion (2010) |

Voila! is the third studio album by Italian singer In-Grid. It was released in 2005, and it featured songs on French and English. An English vocal album was also released.

== Track listing ==
1. Mama Mia - 3:40
2. Le Coquin - 3:28
3. Dans Tes Yeux - 3:39
4. Click Clock - 3:43
5. L'Amoureuse - 3:46
6. Oui - 3:06
7. Jamais Eu - 3:11
8. À Poings Fermés - 3:04
9. Où Est Ma Vie? - 3:36
10. Encore Une Fois - 3:08
11. C'est Pour Toi - 3:38

=== English version ===
1. Mama Mia (English Version) - 3:40
2. Karma Fields - 3:31
3. Poison In Your Mind - 3:41
4. Tic Toc - 3:45
5. One More Time - 3:10
6. Raining In Your Heart - 3:48
7. The Slave - 3:05
8. I Was Happy - 3:12
9. If - 3:06
10. Love Out Of Time - 4:07
11. Say You're Mine - 3:37
12. You Kissed Me - 3:09
13. Really Really Wanna - 3:41
14. Every Night - 4:32
15. Come Back Home - 3:39

== Certifications ==
| Region | Certification | Certified units/sales |
|---|---|---|
| Russia (NFPF) | Platinum | 20,000^{*} |
^{*} Sales figures based on certification alone.
