= In-tango =

2003 single by In-Grid

Single by In-Grid

from the album Rendez-vous
- B-side: "We Tango Alone"
- Released: 2003
- Length: 3:27
- Label: X-Energy
- Songwriters: Marco Soncini, Ingrid Alberini
- Producer: Alfredo Larry Pignagnoli

In-Grid singles chronology
"Tu es foutu" (2001)	"In-tango" (2003)	"I'm folle de toi" (2003)

"In-tango" is a song by Italian dancer and singer-songwriter In-Grid, released in 2003. The English version of this song, entitled "We Tango Alone", was included as a B-side track in Italy and issued as its own single in Australia. "In-tango" reached the top 10 in Denmark and Romania and entered the top 40 in Germany, Greece, Hungary, and Spain.

== Lyrics ==
The lyrics were written by In-Grid and Marco Soncini, who co-produced the song with Alfredo Larry Pignagnoli. The English version was also co-written by Daniela Galli (also known as Dhany) and Paul Sears.

== Track listings ==
Italian maxi-CD single

1. "In-tango" (In-String edit) – 3:25
2. "In-tango" (In-String extended) – 4:22
3. "In-tango" (Gambafreaks remix) – 5:07
4. "In-tango" (Sfaction mix full extended) – 5:05
5. "We Tango Alone" (edit) – 3:26

Italian 12-inch single

A1. "In-tango" (In-String extended) – 4:22
A2. "In-tango" (In-String edit) – 3:25
B1. "In-tango" (Gambafreaks remix) – 5:07
B2. "In-tango" (Sfaction mix full extended) – 5:05

European CD single

1. "In-tango" (In-String edit) – 3:25
2. "In-tango" (In-String extended) – 4:22

German maxi-CD single

1. "In-tango" (In-String edit) – 3:25
2. "In-tango" (Pocho edit) – 3:47
3. "In-tango" (In-String extended) – 4:22
4. "In-tango" (video)

Australian CD single

1. "In-tango (We Tango Alone)" (radio edit) – 3:26
2. "In-tango (We Tango Alone)" (extended) – 4:26
3. "In-tango" (radio edit) – 3:26
4. "In-tango" (Gambafreaks remix) – 5:00
5. "In-tango" (S-Faction mix Benny Benassi remix) – 5:05
6. "In-tango" (In-Piano extended mix) – 4:19
7. "You Promised Me (Tu es foutu)" (radio edit) – 3:40
8. "Tu es foutu" (Harlem Hustlers club mix) – 7:34

== Charts ==
=== Weekly charts ===
Chart (2003)	Peak position
Australia (ARIA)	63
Belgium (Ultratip Bubbling Under Flanders)	3
Denmark (Tracklisten)	10
Germany (GfK)	35
Greece (IFPI)	11
Hungary (Rádiós Top 40)	26
Netherlands (Single Top 100)	76
Romania (Romanian Top 100)	3
Spain (Promusicae)	14

=== Year-end charts ===
Chart (2003)	Position
Romania (Romanian Top 100)	26
