= Yola Polastri =

Peruvian children's singer and songwriter (1950–2024)

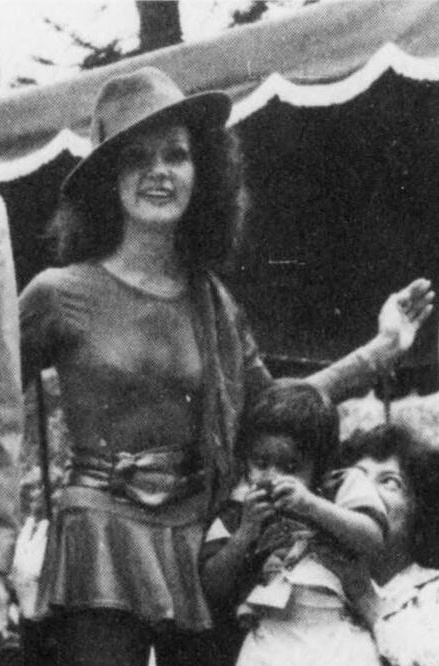
- Polastri in 1983
- Born: Yolanda Piedad Polastri Giribaldi; 25 February 1950; Lima, Peru
- Died: 7 July 2024 (aged 74); Lima, Peru
- Other names: Yola; La Chica de la Tele; La Reina de los Niños
- Occupations: Singer, songwriter, television presenter
- Years active: 1967–2024

Yolanda Piedad Polastri Giribaldi (25 February 1950 – 7 July 2024), better known as Yola Polastri, was a Peruvian children's singer and songwriter, as well as a television presenter, known for her appearances on children's television shows.

== Early life ==
Polastri was born on 25 February 1950, in Lima, and died on 7 July 2024, in Lima. She was the youngest of four children. Her siblings were María Eugenia, Remo and Augusto. She took ballet classes at an early age in Miraflores and pursued an early acting career at the Club de Teatro de Lima.

== Career ==
Her older brother, Augusto, who was a dancer in a TV show known as Ritmo en el 4, took Polastri to Panamericana Televisión to be part of the group known as Las Cincodélicas. During the early 1970s, she appeared in a number of TV shows, including Ritmolandia, Matrimonio y algo más, El buen ambiente, Topoyadas, El Tío Johnny, Simplemente María, El Adorable Profesor Aldao, Inconquistable Viviana Hortiguera and Un verano para recordar. She later starred in El Mundo de los Niños, which was renamed to Los niños y su mundo, after the government of Juan Velasco Alvarado commissioned a national children's TV show.

After starring in América Televisión's Hola Yola, the success of new shows such as El show de Yuly, El show de Xuxa and Nubeluz led her to move to stage productions. She became an activist for the return of children's programming after its disappearance in the 1990s.

== Death ==
Polastri suffered a stroke in early 2024, being taken to the Clínica Delgado in Miraflores before returning home in a delicate state two months later to recover. Her brother, Remo, died from a stroke on 21 May 2024.

Her Instagram account announced her death on 7 July 2024, at the age of 74. A number of associates and friends offered their condolences soon after. During her wake, her niece revealed that she had died from a heart attack.
