= In-Grid =

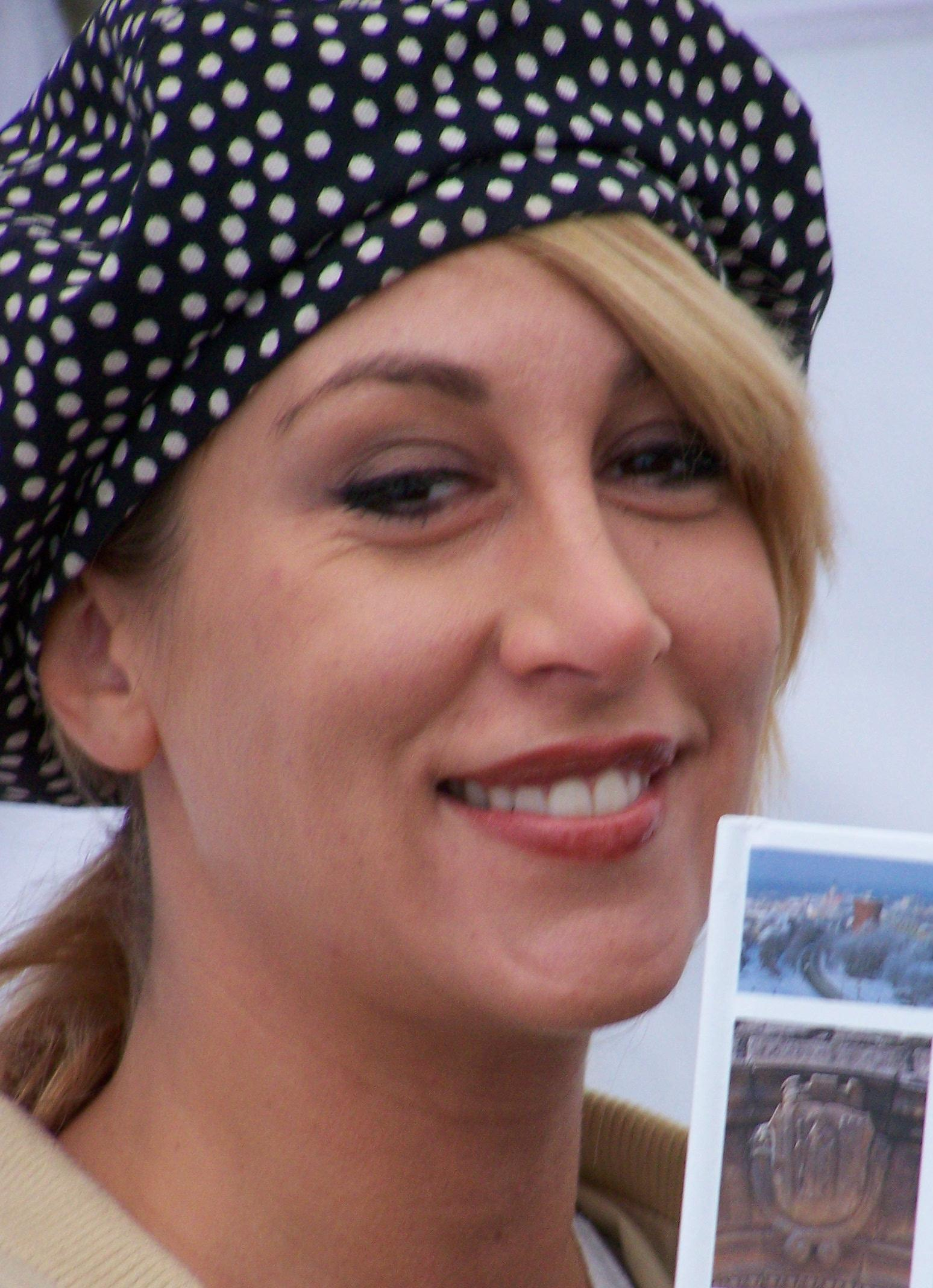
- In-Grid in 2007
- Born: Ingrid Alberini; Guastalla, Italy
- Occupations: Dancer; singer-songwriter; arranger
- Years active: 2000–present
- Musical career
- Genres: Underground dance; eurodance; chanson; house; dance-pop; pop
- Instrument: Vocals
- Labels: X-Energy; ZYX Music
- Website: in-grid.it

Ingrid Alberini, known by her stage name In-Grid, is an Italian dancer and singer-songwriter. Her 2003 club song "Tu es foutu", (English title: "You Promised Me"), charted in several European countries, Australia, Latin America and in the United States, where it reached number six on the Billboard Dance Music/Club Play Singles chart in 2004. The singles "In-tango" and "Mama mia" also became international hits. In 2003, according to the results of the ZD Awards hit parade, she took 3rd place in the list of the most popular foreign artists in Eastern Europe after Madonna and Robbie Williams.

== Career ==
The name Ingrid was given by her parents as tribute to the actress and movie star Ingrid Bergman, who was her father's favorite. Ingrid's parents ran a movie theatre in a small city near Parma and Reggio Emilia, an area known as the cradle of Italian music. Ingrid grew up watching movies and listening to sound tracks which, as herself declares, fueled her ambition and desire to convey all her strong emotions to as many people as possible. Ingrid's artistic path started with painting and acting but soon singing turned out to be her most powerful form of expression. She began with piano-bar, musicals and local jazz bands, but soon her soft voice brought her to meet the famous dance music producers Larry Pignagnoli and Marco Soncini. They offered Ingrid to write the lyrics and sing their brand new tune, and soon "Tu es foutu" came to life. The track broke all records of airplay on Italian networks and immediately became an international hit. "Tu es foutu" achieved gold certifications in Australia, Mexico, the Czech Republic, Greece, Romania and Russia, and was certified platinum in Mexico, Poland and Ukraine.

Ingrid has released three dance albums, two chill-out albums and various singles, as well as a number of joint projects with other artists.

== Discography ==
=== Albums ===
List of albums, with selected chart positions and certifications
Year	Title	Chart positions						Certifications
Year	Title	AUT	GER	GRE	POL	SWE	SWI	Certifications
2003	Rendez-vous	23	27	24	3	53	41	POL: Platinum; RUS: 5× Platinum
2004	La vie en rose	—	—	—	2	—	—	POL: Gold
2005	Voila!	—	—	—	—	—	—	RUS: Platinum
2009	Passion	—	—	—	—	—	—	
2010	Lounge musique	—	—	—	—	—	—	

=== Singles ===
List of singles, with selected chart positions
Year	Title	Chart positions									Album
Year	Title	AUS	AUT	DEN	GER	GRE	NED	POL	SWE	US Dance	Album
2000	"Someday"	—	—	—	—	—	—	—	—	—	singles only
2001	"I Won't Cry"	—	—	—	—	—	—	—	—	—	singles only
2001	"I Was a Ye-Ye Girl" with Doing Time	—	—	—	—	—	—	—	—	—	singles only
2001	"Tu es foutu" (aka "You Promised Me")	7	6	2	9	1	3	2	1	6	Rendez-vous
2003	"In-tango" (aka "We Tango Alone")	63	—	10	35	—	76	2	—	—	Rendez-vous
2003	"I'm folle de toi"	—	—	—	—	—	—	4	—	—	Rendez-vous
2003	"Shock"	—	—	—	—	—	—	—	—	32	Rendez-vous
2004	"Ah l'amour l'amour"	—	—	—	—	—	—	—	—	—	Rendez-vous
2004	"Milord"	—	—	—	—	—	—	7	—	—	La Vie en Rose
2005	"Mama mia"	—	—	—	88	—	52	9	—	—	Voilà!
2005	"Tu es là?" with Pochill	—	—	—	—	—	—	—	—	—	single only
2006	"Oui" (aka "If")	—	—	—	—	—	—	—	—	—	Voilà!
2007	"I Love" with Stachursky	—	—	—	—	—	—	9	—	—	Największe Przeboje EP
2009	"Le Dragueur"	—	—	—	—	—	—	—	—	—	Passion
2009	"Les Fous" (aka "Stick to You")	—	—	—	—	—	—	—	—	—	Passion
2010	"Vive le swing"	—	—	—	—	—	—	—	—	—	Passion
2014	"J'adore" with Rouge	—	—	—	—	—	—	—	—	—	singles only
2015	"Kiki Swing" with Rouge	—	—	—	—	—	—	—	—	—	singles only
